= The Healers: The Last Chapter =

Studio album by Black Motion
- Released: September 24, 2020
- Label: Spirit Motion
- Producer: Sun-El Musician; Da Capo; Bongani Mohosana; Roy Thabo Mabogwane

Black Motion chronology
Moya Wa Taola (2018)	The Healers: The Last Chapter (2020)	Rebirth of the Drum (2023)

The Healers: The Last Chapter is a sixth studio album by South African house duo Black Motion, released on September 24, 2020 by Spirit Motion. It features Simmy, TRESOR, Msaki, Sauti Sol, Mo-T and others as guest artists.

The album won Best Dance Album at the 27th South African Music Awards.

== Title ==
The name "The Healers: The Last Chapter" refers to the celebration of 10 years since their formation in 2010.

== Promotion and release ==
The Healers: The Last Chapter was released on September 24, 2020. The album was revealed in August 2020 and pre-add were made available.

"Marry Me" featuring South African singer Msaki was released in August 2020.

To promote the album the house duo partnered with Red Bull Rendezvous and re-recorded live The Healers: The Last Chapter at Three Rondavels, Graskop, Mpumalanga.

== Accolades ==
The Healers: The Last Chapter was nominated for Album of the Year and won Best Dance Album at the 27th South African Music Awards.

Year	Nominee / work	Award	Result
2021	The Healers: The Last Chapter	Album of the Year	Nominated
2021	The Healers: The Last Chapter	Best Dance Album	Won

== Track listing ==
Standard Edition
No.	Title	Length
1.	"Beat of Africa" (featuring Celimpilo, Nokwazi)	6:53
2.	"Hosana" (featuring Sun-El Musician, Nobuhle)	4:49
3.	"Marry Me" (featuring Msaki)	6:31
4.	"Ome" (Brenden Praise)	5:47
5.	"Ake Cheat" (with Rein Carol featuring King Monada)	6:01
6.	"Ven pa ka" (featuring Homeboyz)	6:23
7.	"Mshubo" (featuring Ihashi Elimhlophe)	4:37
8.	"To my tribe" (featuring Bonj)	5:47
9.	"Uleleni" (with Ami Faku)	5:11
10.	"Noyana" (featuring Dumza Maswana)	6:56
11.	"Sibusiso" (featuring Samthing Soweto)	6:00
12.	"I Wanna Be" (featuring Kabza de Small, DJ Maphorisa and Brenden Praise)	5:59
13.	"LaSalsa" (featuring Simmy)	6:03
14.	"Blood Stream" (featuring TRESOR)	7:01
15.	"Soyeka" (Caiiro, Tabia)	8:51
16.	"Trap en los" (featuring Nokwazi)	7:31
17.	"Free" (featuring Sauti Sol)	6:08
18.	"Can't deny the feeling" (featuring Zamo)	6:38
19.	"Technology" (featuring Da Capo)	8:03
20.	"Peperuka" (featuring Iddz Aziz)	6:11
21.	"Amandla" (featuring NaakMusiq)	6:02
22.	"Pretty lights" (featuring Alie Keys, KB, Tshepo)	7:22
23.	"Lava" (featuring Pricha)	6:33
24.	"Vuka" (featuring Indlovukazi, DJ Fortee)	5:14
25.	"Stametta" (featuring Afrikan Roots, Chymamusique, TDEEP, Gorge Munetsi)	5:40
26.	"Swing Jozi" (featuring Melehloka)	6:16
27.	"Everything (Edit)" (with Afrotraction featuring Mo-T)	3:43
28.	"Hosanna (Edit)" (featuring Sun-El Musician, Nobuhle)	4:01
29.	"Marry Me (Edit)" (featuring Msaki)	4:47
30.	"Ome (Edit)" (featuring Brenden Praise)	4:38
31.	"Ake Cheat" (with Rein Carol featuring King Monada)	4:21
32.	"Ven pa ka (Edit)" (Homeboyz)	4:00
33.	"Mshubo (Edit)" (featuring Ihashi Elimhlophe)	3:13
34.	"Uleleni (Edit)" (with Ami Faku)	4:05
35.	"Noyana (Edit)" (featuring Dumza Mswana)	4:49
36.	"Sibusiso (Edit)" (featuring Samthing Soweto)	4:00
37.	"Blood Stream (Edit)" (TRESOR)	4:42
38.	"Trap en los (Edit)" (featuring Nokwazi)	5:18
39.	"Free (Edit)" (featuring Sauti Soul)	3:26
40.	"Can't deny the feeling (Edit)" (featuring Zamo)
41.	"LaSalsa (Edit)" (featuring Simmy)	4:15
Total length:		3:31:00

== Release history ==
Release dates and formats for The Healers: The Last Chapter
Region	Date	Format(s)	Edition(s)	Label	Ref.
South Africa	24 September 2020	Digital download; streaming	Standard	Spirit Motion	
