= Mlindo the Vocalist discography =

Songs and albums from Mlindo the Vocalist

- Studio albums: 2
- Singles: 5
- Music videos: 5

South African singer-songwriter Mlindo the Vocalist has released two studio album and five singles, including six as featured.

== Studio albums ==
List of albums, with selected details, sales figures and certifications
Title	Album details	Certifications
Emakhaya	Released: 21 September 2018 (SA); Label: Blaqboy Music, Sony Music Africa; Formats: CD, digital download	RiSA: Platinum
Lindokuhle	Released: 22 July 2022; Label: Blaqboy Music, Sony Music Africa; Formats: Digital download, streaming	

== Singles ==
List of singles, showing year released and album name
Title	Year	Peak chart positions	Certifications	Album
Title	Year	Radiomonitor SA	Certifications	Album
"AmaBlesser"	2018	1	RiSA: 4× Platinum	Emakhaya
"Macala"	2018	1	RISA: Gold	Emakhaya
"—" denotes a recording that did not chart or was not released in that territory.

=== As featured artist ===
Title	Year	Album
"Bamthathile" (Sun-El Musician featuring Mlindo the Vocalist)	2018	Africa to the World
"Thando" (Thee Legacy & DJ Maphorisa featuring Mlindo the Vocalist)	2019	Non-album single
"You and I" (Riky Rick featuring Mlindo the Vocalist)	2019	Non-album single
"Ngiyazfela" (Donald featuring Mlindo the Vocalist)	2019	Non-album single
Lotto (Samthing Soweto featuring Mlindo the Vocalist, Kabza De Small and DJ Maphorisa)	2019	Isiphithithi
"Amehlo" (Jamville featuring Mlindo The Vocalist)	2020	
"Mjolo (Makhadzi featuring Mlindo the Vocalist)	2021	Kokovha
"Baningi" (Mthunzi featuring Mlindo the Vocalist)	2021	Non-album single
