= Platinumb Heart =

2021 studio album by Msaki

Platinumb Heart is the name of two albums by South African singer Msaki, both released on November 19, 2021.

== Open ==
Platinumb Heart Open

Studio album by Msaki
- Released: 19 November 2021
- Recorded: c. 2020–2021
- Length: 60:10
- Label: ALTBLK (Oneshushuday)
- Producer: Neo Muyanga; Msaki

Singles from Platinumb Heart Open
- 1. "Fetch You Life II" Released: 26 October 2021; 2. "Statues" Released: 16 November 2021

Platinumb Heart Open was produced by Neo Muyanga and Msaki, except for track 3, which was produced by TRESOR and Batundi.

=== Track listing ===
Standard Edition
No.	Title	Writer(s)	Producer(s)	Length
1.	"Umsindo" (featuring Alie-Keys)	Msaki, Alie-Keys and Neo Muyanga	Msaki, Alie-Keys and Neo Muyanga	3:14
2.	"Delta Love"	Msaki	Msaki and Neo Muyanga	3:38
3.	"Hold Me Down" (featuring TRESOR)	Msaki, TRESOR and Batundi	TRESOR and Batundi	3:41
4.	"How Many Bloody Buffalo Bulls"	Msaki and Neo Muyanga	Msaki and Neo Muyanga	1:18
5.	"Bloods Guns and Revolutions"	Msaki	Msaki and Neo Muyanga	6:07
6.	"Hymn 121" (featuring Bulelwa Siliziwe Lusaseni)	Msaki and Bulelwa Siliziwe Lusaseni	Msaki and Neo Muyanga	1:16
7.	"Fetch You Life II"	Msaki	Msaki and Neo Muyanga	5:07
8.	"Enough"	Msaki	Msaki and Neo Muyanga	4:16
9.	"Catalyst"	Msaki	Msaki and Neo Muyanga	3:34
10.	"Six Billion Thousand Hundred Leventeen"	Msaki	Msaki and Neo Muyanga	1:20
11.	"Anisixabisanga" (featuring The Brother Move On)	The Brother Moves On and Msaki	Msaki and Neo Muyanga	7:06
12.	"Six Billion Thousand Hundred and Twelve"	Msaki	Msaki and Neo Muyanga	1:57
13.	"Stautes"	Msaki and Neo Muyanga	Msaki and Neo Muyanga	6:50
14.	"At Stake" (featuring Thesis SA)	Thesis SA, Msaki and Neo Muyanga	Msaki and Neo Muyanga	5:16
15.	"Mandiphefumle"	Msaki	Msaki and Neo Muyanga	2:00
16.	"Born In a Taxi"	Msaki	Msaki and Neo Muyanga	5:13
17.	"Tiram"	Msaki and Neo Muyanga	Msaki and Neo Muyanga	4:08
18.	"White Shadow" (with Beatenberg)	Beatenberg, Msaki and Neo Muyanga	Msaki and Neo Muyanga	4:08
Total length:				60:10

== Beating ==
Platinumb Heart Beating

Studio album by Msaki
- Released: 19 November 2021
- Recorded: 2020–2021
- Genre: Electronic
- Length: 60:26
- Label: ALTBLK (Oneshushuday)
- Producer: Various

Msaki chronology
Zaneliza: How The Water Moves (2017)	Platinumb Heart Beating (2021)

Singles from Platinumb Heart Beating
- 1. "Mntakababa" Released: 26 October 2021

Platinumb Heart Beating focuses on electronic music mixed with Afro house, and Afro tech elements. Unlike Open, the album features various producers like Sun-El Musician, Kabza De Small and Black Coffee.

=== Track listing ===
Standard Edition
No.	Title	Writer(s)	Producer(s)	Length
1.	"Kuja Utanipata" (with Sun-El Musician)	Msaki, Sun-El Musician	Sun-El Musician and Kenza	4:02
2.	"Nangomso" (featuring Simmy)	Msaki, Simmy and Sun-El Musician	Kenza and Sun-El Musician	3:05
3.	"Come Around" (featuring Kenza and Mpho.Wav)	Msaki, Sun-El Musician, Kenza and Mpho.wav	Sun-El Musician, Kenza and Mpho.wav	4:28
4.	"Mjolo For Who" (featuring Abidoza)	Msaki and Abidoza	Abidoza and Msaki	6:50
5.	"Tomorrow Silver" (with Sun-El Musician featuring Diplo)	Diplo and Msaki	Nitti Gritti, Diplo, Maximilian Jaeger and Sun-El Musician	5:08
6.	"Ndizincamile" (featuring Laliboi)	Laliboi, Msaki and Sun-El Musician	Kenza and Sun-El Musician	4:39
7.	"Uthando Lwam" (featuring Black Coffee)	Black Coffee and Msaki	Black Coffee	5:50
8.	"Heart Mend Hotel" (featuring Nonku Phiri)	Nonku Phiri and Msaki	Gregory Nottingham	0:41
9.	"Mntakababa" (with Kabza De Small and Focalistic)	Focalistic, Msaki and Kabza De Small	Msaki and Kabza De Small	5:09
10.	"Boy from Shoshanguve" (with Black Motion)	Msaki, Smol, Kenza, Murdah Bongz and Sun-El Musician	Sun-El Musician, Smol, Kenza and Murdah Bongz	6:59
11.	"Fika Kaloko" (with Kabza De Small)	Msaki and Kabza De Small	Kabza De Small	5:58
12.	"Pearls To Swine" (featuring TRESOR and Kid X)	Msaki, TRESOR and Kid X	Msaki & Neo Muyanga	5:08
13.	"Delakufa" (with Oskido)	Msaki and OSKIDO	Oskido	4:38
14.	"Statues II" (featuring Da Capo and Black Motion)	Msaki, Da Capo, Murdah Bongz and Smol	Da Capo, Murdah Bongz and Smol	7:26
15.	"Chem Trails" (featuring Caiiro)	Msaki and Caiiro	Msaki and Caiiro	4:50
16.	"No Rainbow" (with Da Capo)	Msaki and Da Capo	Da Capo	5:50
17.	"Steam and Flow" (with TRESOR)	Msaki and TRESOR	TRESOR	3:38
18.	"Mhlaba Wakhala" (featuring Nonku Phiri)	Nonku Phiri and Msaki	Msaki and Nonku Phiri	1:16
Total length:				60:26

== Critical reception ==
=== Year-end lists ===
Select year-end rankings of Platinumb Heart
Critic/Publication	List	Rank	Ref.
Pan-African Music	The 50 best albums of 2021	46	

== Commercial performance ==
The double album has surpassed 1 million streams on Spotify globally.

== Accolades ==
Platinumb Heart Open won Best Alternative Album at 2022 Clout Africa Awards. At the 28th South African Music Awards Platinumb Heart Open won two awards for Female Artist of the Year, Best Contemporary Album of the Year, nominated for Best Produced Album of the Year, and Best Collaboration ("No Rainbow" featuring Da Capo).

Year	Nominee / work	Award	Result	Ref.
2022	Platinumb Heart Open	Best Alternative Album	Won	
2022	Platinumb Heart Open	Female Artist of the Year	Won	
2022	Platinumb Heart Open	Best Produced Album of the Year	Nominated	
2022	Platinumb Heart Open	Best Adult Contemporary Album	Won	
2022	"No Rainbow"	Best Collaboration	Nominated	

== Release history ==
Release dates and format for Platinumb Heart
Region	Date	Format(s)	Edition	Label	Ref.
South Africa	November 21, 2021	Digital download; streaming	Standard	ALTBLK (Oneshushuday)	
