= Africa to the World =

Studio album by Sun-El Musician
- Released: April 20, 2018
- Recorded: 2016–2018
- Genre: Afro House; house
- Length: 66:53
- Label: EL World Music
- Producer: Sanele Tresure Sithole

Sun-El Musician chronology
Africa to the World (2018)	To the World & Beyond (2020)

Singles from Africa to the World
- 1. "Akanamali" Released: 21 May 2017; 2. "Bamthathile" Released: 23 February 2018

Africa to the World is a debut studio album by South African DJ Sun-El Musician, released on April 20, 2018 through EL World Music.

The album was certified Platinum by the Recording Industry of South Africa (RiSA).

== Critical reception ==
Africa to the World scored 8/10 ratings by YoMzansi.

== Awards ==
Africa to the World was nominated for Best Dance Album and Newcomer of the Year at the 25th South African Music Awards.

Year	Nominee / work	Award	Result	Ref.
2019	Africa to the World	Newcomer of the Year	Nominated	
2019	Africa to the World	Best Dance Album	Nominated	

== Track listing ==
Standard Edition
No.	Title	Writer(s)	Producer(s)	Length
1.	"With You" (featuring Desiree Dawson)	Desiree Dawson; Sanele Tresure Sithole	Sanele Tresure Sithole	5:00
2.	"Akanamali" (featuring Samthing Soweto)	Dibodu Karabo; Sanele Tresure Sithole; Mdolomba Samkelo	Sithole	5:22
3.	"Sengimoja"	Sanele Tresure Sithole		4:25
4.	"Life We Live" (featuring Les-Ego, Nontu X)	Nontuthuko Xulu; Sanele Tresure Sithole; Lesego Mapela		3:17
5.	"No Stopping Us" (featuring S-Tone)	Sanele Tresure Sithole; Magagula Sifiso Sicelo		5:21
6.	"Goodbye" (featuring DJ Charl, Lelo Kamau)	Chaliton Ndlovu; Sanele Tresure Sithole; Amanda Ngcobo		6:05
7.	"Umalukatane" (featuring S-Tone)	Sanele Tresure Sithole; Magagula Sifiso Sicelo		5:46
8.	"Sonini" (featuring Simmy, Lelo Kamau)	Simphiwe Majobe Nhlangulela; Sanele Tresure Sithole; Amanda Ngcobo		5:45
9.	"Ntaba Ezikude" (featuring Simmy)	Simphiwe Majobe Nhlangulela; Sanele Tresure Sithole		5:48
10.	"Random"			5:51
11.	"The Wave"		Sithole	5:55
12.	"Bamthathile" (featuring Mlindo the Vocalist)			3:50
13.	"Yere Faga (Remix)" (featuring Oumou Sangaré)			4:28
Total length:				66:53

== Certifications ==
Region	Certification	Certified units/sales
South Africa (RISA)	Platinum	20,000^{‡}
^{‡} Sales+streaming figures based on certification alone.

== Release and singles ==
Africa to the World standard edition was released on April 20, 2018.

"Akanamali" was released on May 21, 2017 as album's lead single. The song peak at number one in South Africa.

== Release history ==
Release dates and formats for Africa to the World
Region	Date	Format(s)	Edition(s)	Label	Ref.
South Africa	20 April 2018	Digital download; streaming	Standard	EL World Music	
