= Tugela Fairy (Made of Stars) =

2020 studio album by Simmy

Studio album by Simmy
- Released: 20 November 2020
- Genre: Neo Soul; Afro House; Afro-Pop
- Length: 72:29
- Label: EL World Music; Sony
- Producer: Sanele Sithole; Claudio Wade Jaftha; Keanen Leroy Bekeer; Nicodimas Sekheta Mogashoa; Mpho Mohlolong

Simmy chronology
Tugela Fairy (2018)	Tugela Fairy (Made of Stars) (2020)

Singles from Tugela Fairy (Made of Stars)
- 1. "Ngihamba Nawe" Released: 26 March 2020; 2. "Emakhaya" Released: 16 October 2020

Tugela Fairy (Made of Stars) is the second studio album by South African singer and songwriter Simmy, released on 6 November 2020, through EL World Music and Sony.

The album debuted at number 3 in South Africa.

== Background ==
In October 2020, Simmy announced her album via Instagram account.

== Music and lyrics ==
The standard edition Tugela Fairy (Made Of Stars) is about one hour, twelve minutes, and 29 seconds long, consisting of 16 tracks.

=== Composition ===
Critics categorize Tugela Fairy (Made of Stars) as a Neo Soul, Afro House, and Afro-Pop. It also incorporates Maskandi, Mbaqanga, Kwaito, and Old house elements.

=== Themes ===
Tugela Fairy (Made of Stars) lyrically is the continuation of her debut album Tugela Fairy, it describe musical journey and tells her story of strength and woman empowerment.

John Israel A of Ubetoo said "the album is a compilation worth the wait and a splendid advertisement of Simmy’s musical growth" and rated the album 4.5/5.

=== Year-end lists ===
Select year-end rankings of Tugela Fairy (Made of Stars)
Critic/Publication	List	Rank	Ref.
The Native	Best 20 Albums This Year	16	

== Commercial performance ==
Upon its release the album debuted number 3 in South Africa.

== Track listing ==
Standard Edition
No.	Title	Length
1.	"Intro"	1:58
2.	"Indaba"	5:21
3.	"Ngihamba Nawe" (featuring Sino Msolo)	3:37
4.	"Hamba Ngifike" (featuring Ami Faku)	4:15
5.	"Imihla Nezolo"	4:28
6.	"Konke" (featuring S-Tone)	3:56
7.	"Mabhungu"	5:04
8.	"Emakhaya" (featuring Da Capo and Sun-El Musician)	4:46
9.	"Stay With You" (featuring Black Motion)	4:56
10.	"Ngiyahamba" (featuring Mthunzi)	5:23
11.	"My Light"	5:03
12.	"We Were Here"	5:25
13.	"Time After Time"	4:45
14.	"Uhlale Wazi"	4:41
15.	"Wamuhle"	4:07
16.	"Angimale" (featuring Khuzani)	4:44
Total length:		72:29

== Accolades ==
The album was nominated for Best Afro pop Album at the 27th ceremony of South African Music Awards.

Year	Nominee / work	Award	Result
2021	Tugela Fairy (Made of Stars)	Best Afro Pop Album	Nominated
2021	Tugela Fairy (Made of Stars)	Best Produced Album of the Year	Nominated

== Certifications ==
Region	Certification	Certified units/sales
South Africa (RISA)	Gold	10,000^{‡}
^{‡} Sales+streaming figures based on certification alone.

== Releases ==
"Emakhaya" was released on October 16, 2020, featuring South African DJ's Sun-El Musician and Da Capo as album's second single.

== Release history ==
Release dates and formats for Tugela Fairy (Made of Stars)
Region	Date	Format	Version	Label	Ref.
South Africa	November 20, 2020	CD; digital download; streaming	Standard	EL World Music; Sony	
