= Motion (Tresor album) =

Studio album by TRESOR
- Released: October 15, 2021
- Recorded: 2020
- Genre: Afro pop, Pop, disco, Alternative, Dance, Amapiano
- Length: 58:00
- Language: Swahili; French; Zulu; English
- Label: Jacquel Entertainment Group

TRESOR chronology
Rumble in the Jungle (2021)	Motion (2021)

Singles from Motion
- 1. "Lighthouse" Released: September 3, 2021; 2. "Makosa" Released: September 7, 2021

Motion is the fourth studio album by Congolese-born singer TRESOR. It was released through Jacquel Entertainment Group on October 15, 2021, and features guest appearances from local South African musicians such as Ami Faku, Msaki, Da Capo, Sun-El Musician and Scorpion Kings (Kabza De Small and DJ Maphorisa).

== Background ==
On October 4, 2021, TRESOR revealed the album cover and track listing. TRESOR said:

I'm excited to finally announce my new album MOTION comes out this month. I explore and experiment with a lot of new sounds. I can't wait for the world to hear it.

== Singles ==
The single "Zwakala" was released on 22 June 2020. The song was released during the period where women were in the spotlight once again as GBV reared. TRESOR said:

I was inspired to do something cool with the song. More than anything, the song is a love story and through the video I've pushed the envelope. It talks about a sexual liberation especially for women. Owning their bodies and expressing themselves.

The album's lead single "Lighthouse" was released on 3 September 2021 and featured South African musicians Da Capo and Sun-El Musician. The music video was released on 2 October 2021 and was directed by Tresor and Marty Bleazard.

"Makosa" is the seventh song from Motion and was released on 7 September 2021. The song features amapiano record producers Kabza De Small and DJ Maphorisa. Tresor told Channel O:

Makosa was inspired by a beautiful summer in Africa. Sunsets in a vibrant African city with people living carefree, sweating and dancing their lives away.

== Track listing ==
Motion track listing
No.	Title	Writer(s)	Producer(s)	Length
1.	"Lighthouse"	TRESOR	Da Capo; Sun-El Musician	5:35
2.	"Smoke & Mirrors" (featuring Ami Faku)			3:54
3.	"Call Me Back"			4:03
4.	"Hold Me Down" (featuring Msaki)			3:41
5.	"Zwakala"			3:56
6.	"Last December"			3:28
7.	"Makosa"	TRESOR	DJ Maphorisa; Kabza De Small	4:31
8.	"Anginalutho"			4:15
9.	"Thrill"			3:56
10.	"Niambie"			4:11
11.	"Nyota"	TRESOR	DJ Maphorisa; Kabza De Small	3:59
12.	"Dancing with the Moon"			4:02
13.	"Bring On the Night"			5:39
14.	"Starlight"			2:53
Total length:				58:00

== Accolades ==
Motion scored a nomination for Best Pop Album at the 28th South African Music Awards.

Year	Nominee / work	Award	Result
2022	Motion	Best Pop Album	Won

== Release history ==
Release dates and formats for Motion
Region	Date	Format(s)	Label(s)	Ref.
Various	October 15, 2021	Digital download; streaming	Jacquel Entertainment Group	
