= Nostalgia (Tresor album) =

Studio album by TRESOR
- Released: January 25, 2019
- Genre: Afro pop, Pop, disco, Alternative, Dance
- Length: 52:00
- Language: Swahili; French; Zulu; English
- Label: VII Recordings x Universal Music

TRESOR chronology
The Beautiful Madness (2017)	Nostalgia (2019)	Rumble in the Jungle (2021)

Singles from Nostalgia
- 1. "Silale" Released: 6 September 2018; 2. "Sondela" Released: April 12, 2019

Nostalgia is the third studio album by Congolese-born singer TRESOR. It was released on 25 January 2019 through his label VII Recordings. The album features African artists AKA, Kwesta, Lokua Kanza, Beatenberg, Mafikizolo, The Soil, Sauti Sol and Msaki. The 13-track album won Best afro pop album at the 25th South African Music Awards in 2019 and was certified Gold by the Recording Industry of South Africa (RiSA) on 26 September 2020.

== Background ==
TRESOR referred to the album as his most personal project. Explaining his album:

Nostalgia is a sonic trip into my childhood; I basically went back into the music era I grew up in, listening to the music that shaped who I am from the likes of Hugh Masekela, Papa Wemba and Chico Twala. I just boxed all that music and interpreted in a way that allows me to show people what moulded me into the artist I’ve become as an adult.

== Singles ==
The album's lead single "Silale" was released on 6 September 2018 and featured South African a cappella group The Soil. The single was certified Gold by the Recording Industry of South Africa.

"Aphrodite" is the second song that was released from Nostlagia, after The Soil-assisted "Silale," which came out in early September. The song featured Afro pop band Beatenberg. TRESOR telling People Magazine about the song:

I am truly thrilled to share this collaboration with my Beatenberg brothers. The song was written and produced in Cape Town throughout summer last year. Matthew Field (of Beatenberg) and I wanted to create a musical piece that reflects the sounds that we both grew up listening to. We both love Greek mythology and history, so we wanted to play with idea of falling deeply in love with Aphrodite, an ancient Greek goddess associated with love, beauty, pleasure, and procreation. We had so much fun making this song and I think we created something truly magical. Excited to share it with the world.

The song was certified 4× Platinum by the Recording Industry of South Africa.

The fourth song "Electric Night" featured South African rapper AKA. TRESOR expressing about the song:

This new song with AKA will remind you of the bubble gum era. I’m really excited about how this song came about.

The song was certified Gold by the Recording Industry of South Africa.

The eleventh song, "Sondela" featured South African singer Msaki. The song was nominated for record of the year at the 26th South African Music Awards and was certified 5× Platinum by the Recording Industry of South Africa. The music video was released on 13 April 2019 and was directed by Marty Bleazard under creative direction of Tresor's references to Beyoncé's iconic Vogue Magazine takeover in September 2018. The music video reached 1 million views on YouTube three months after its release.

== Track listing ==
Nostalgia
No.	Title	Length
1.	"Silale" (featuring The Soil)	4:43
2.	"Aphrodite" (featuring Beatenberg)	3:54
3.	"Walk Through Fire"	4:09
4.	"Electric Night" (featuring AKA)	4:04
5.	"Sema Aye"	4:16
6.	"Kiss Of Life" (featuring Mafikizolo)	4:19
7.	"Nangoja" (featuring Lokua Kanza)	3:59
8.	"I Don’t Wanna Live Without You"	4:02
9.	"Njia Yetu"	4:00
10.	"Sundown" (featuring Kwesta)	3:48
11.	"Sondela" (featuring Msaki)	4:33
12.	"La vie (2018 Ford Everest Campaign Soundtrack)"	1:56
13.	"On va bouger" (featuring Sauti Sol)	4:16
Total length:		52:00

== Release history ==
List of release dates, showing region, formats, label, editions and reference
Region	Date	Format(s)	Label	Edition(s)
Various	29 January 2019	CD; digital download; streaming	VII Recordings x Universal Music	Standard

== Accolades ==
Awards and nominations for Nostalgia
Year	Ceremony	Category	Result	Ref.
2019	South African Music Awards	Best Pop Album	Won	

== Certifications ==
Region	Certification	Certified units/Sales
South Africa (RiSA)	Gold	15,000+
