= Emakhaya (song) =

2020 single by Simmy

Single by Simmy featuring Da Capo and Sun-El Musician

from the album Tugela Fairy (Made of Stars)
- Language: Zulu language
- English title: At Home
- Released: 16 October 2020
- Genre: Afro-Pop; house
- Length: 4:46
- Label: EL World; SME Africa
- Songwriter(s): Simphiwe M. Nhlangulela; Sanele T. Sithole; Nicodimas S. Mogashoa; Mpho Mohlong
- Producer(s): Nicodimas S. Mogashoa; Sanele T. Sithole

Simmy singles chronology
"Nawe (Radio Edit)" (2019)	"Emakhaya" (2020)	"How Deep Is Your Love" (2021)

Da Capo singles chronology
"Moyo Wangu" (2020)	"Emakhaya" (2020)	"Femi & Gene" (2021)

Sun-El Musician singles chronology
"Never Never" (2020)	"Emakhaya" (2020)	"Garden" (2020)

Music video
- "Emakhaya (Official music video)"

Official audio
- "Emakhaya"

"Emakhaya" is a single by South African singer-songwriter best known under the alias of Simmy from her second studio album Tugela Fairy (Made of Stars), it was released on 16 October 2020 through EL World (with exclusive license from SME Africa). The single features guest appearances and production from Sun-El Musician and Da Capo, and it was certified Platinum by the Recording Industry of South Africa (RiSA).

== Certifications ==
Region	Certification	Certified units/sales
South Africa (RISA)	Platinum	20,000^{‡}
^{‡} Sales+streaming figures based on certification alone.
