= VII (Tresor album) =

2015 album by TRESOR

Studio album by TRESOR
- Released: September 18, 2015
- Genre: Afro pop, Pop, Alternative, Dance
- Length: 62:00
- Language: Swahili; English
- Label: Sony Music

TRESOR chronology
VII (2015)	VII (Repack) (2016)

VII is the debut studio album by Congolese-born singer TRESOR. It was released on 18 September 2015 through Sony Music. The album features South African artists Beatenberg, Khuli Chana, AKA and the Soil. The 17-track album won Best Pop Album at the 2016 South African Music Awards and was nominated for Album of the Year and Best Newcomer, which made it one of the most nominated albums.

== Background ==
The album had taken him seven years to compose and detailed his seven years of being in South Africa and working on the album since. TRESOR explained his album to News24:

I am very excited to share this music that I have crafted for the past seven years. This is a soundtrack to my story. I have poured my whole heart and soul in this record. It's my gold and I truly hope that whoever listens to it finds their piece of gold in it too.

== Singles ==
The song "Mount Everest" featured South African rapper AKA. The song received positive feedback and was remixed by DJ Freddy Verano. The music video was released on 6 February 2015.

"Zambezi" is the fourth song from VII. The song was written by TRESOR in collaboration with Matthew Field from Beatenberg and was a fan favourite at the time of its release.

== Track listing ==
VII
No.	Title	Length
1.	"Adisi Ya Mama (My Mother's Story)"	0:49
2.	"Mount Everest"	4:00
3.	"Fight for You"	4:04
4.	"Zambezi" (featuring Beatenberg)	4:01
5.	"I Run"	4:34
6.	"Beat the Dust"	4:53
7.	"Elisabeth"	3:51
8.	"Never Let Me Go"	3:32
9.	"Goma"	1:33
10.	"Limbisa"	4:09
11.	"Mon Amour"	4:07
12.	"Cachet" (featuring the Soil)	4:46
13.	"This Is Home" (featuring Khuli Chana)	4:13
14.	"Baba"	2:05
15.	"Kinshasa"	2:08
16.	"Mount Everest" (featuring AKA)	3:38
17.	"Mount Everest Radio Edit" (Freddy Verano Remix)	3:43
Total length:		62:00

== Accolades ==
Awards and nominations for VII
Year	Ceremony	Category	Result	Ref.
2016	South African Music Awards	Album of the Year	Nominated	
2016	South African Music Awards	Best Pop Album	Won	
2016	South African Music Awards	Best Newcomer	Nominated	

== Release history ==
List of release dates, showing region, formats, label, editions and reference
Region	Date	Format(s)	Label	Edition(s)
Various	18 September 2015	CD; digital download; streaming	Sony Music	Standard

== VII (Repack) ==
VII (Repack)

Studio album by TRESOR
- Released: 12 August 2016
- Recorded: 2016
- Genre: Afro pop
- Length: 73
- Label: Sony Music

TRESOR chronology
VII (2015)	VII (Repack) (2016)	The Beautiful Madness (2017)

TRESOR released VII (Repack), an extended version of VII, on 12 August 2016. It featured three new songs including the singles "Mount Everest", "Never Let Me Go" (Mobi Dixon Remix), "Zambezi" with Beatenberg, the new single "This Is Home" featuring Khuli Chana, a new version of "Beat the Dust" featuring Sauti Sol and a live recording of TRESOR on tour with Seal.

TRESOR expressing how he felt:

It's such an incredible feeling to see the music being appreciated in different corners of the globe. As a pioneer of African pop music, reaching number one is a sign that we are on the right path, taking the new sound, moulded in Africa, to the world. We are just getting started. The mission is to make the whole world dance.

The song "Never Let Me Go" (Mobi Dixon Remix) was nominated for Best Remix of the Year at the 22nd South African Music Awards.

On 26 October 2016, to showcase the album, TRESOR kicked off his VII Repack Tour showcase at The Goodluck Bar in Newtown in Johannesburg.

=== Additional track listing ===
No.	Title	Length
1.	"Zambezi (Live)" (featuring Beatenberg)	5:24
2.	"Beat the Dust" (featuring Sauti Sol)	4:03
3.	"Never Let Me Go" (Spade Remix)	4:19
Total length:		73:00
