= African Electronic Dance Music =

Studio album by Sun-El Musician
- Released: 29 October 2021
- Genre: Electronic; Afro-house
- Length: 60:03
- Label: EL World Music
- Producer: Sun-El Musician

Sun-El Musician chronology
To the World & Beyond (2020)	African Electronic Dance Music (2021)	Under The Sun (2026)

Singles from African Electronic Dance Music
- 1. "Higher" Released: 17 September 2021; 2. "Amateki / Ululate" Released: 5 October 2021; 3. "Woza" Released: 15 October 2021

African Electronic Dance Music is an album by South African DJ and music producer Sun-El Musician, released by EL World Music on October 29, 2021. It features appearances by Ami Faku, Msaki, Yamisava, Bholoja, Simmy, and Linos Rosetta.

Musically, African Electronic Dance Music is an Electronic, and Afro-house record.

== Critical reception ==
=== Year-end lists ===
Select year-end rankings of African Electronic Dance Music
Critic/Publication	List	Rank	Ref.
Pan-African Music	The 30 best albums of 2021	1	

== Singles ==
"Higher", which features South African singer Simmy, was released as the album's lead single on September 17, 2021.

== Awards ==
African Electronic Dance Music received three nominations; Album of the Year, Male Artist of the Year, and Best Dance Album at the 28th South African Music Awards.

Year	Nominee / work	Award	Result
2022	African Electronic Dance Music	Album of the Year	Nominated
2022	African Electronic Dance Music	Male Artist of the Year	Nominated
2022	African Electronic Dance Music	Best Dance Album	Nominated

== Track listing ==
African Electronic Dance Music track listing
No.	Title	Writer(s)	Length
1.	"Zube Nami" (featuring Yamisava)	Sanele Sithole; Yamisava	5:10
2.	"Amateki" (featuring Bholoja)	Bholoja	4:40
3.	"Higher" (featuring Simmy)	Simmy	8:13
4.	"Ululate"		6:38
5.	"Woza" (featuring Linos Rosetta)	Linos Rosetta; Sithole	4:19
6.	"Jozi (Maboneng)"		7:25
7.	"Spiritual Bomb" (featuring DJ Thakzin)		6:30
8.	"Alone"		4:04
9.	"Esibayeni" (featuring Bholoja)	Bholoja	5:53
10.	"Bestfriend" (featuring Msaki)		5:50
11.	"I Like It Anyway" (featuring Ami Faku)	Ami Faku; Sithole	4:40
Total length:			60:03

== Personnel ==
Credits for African Electronic Dance Music adapted from Genius.

- Sun-El Musician - Producer (track 1-11), writer
- Ami Faku - Writer

== Release history ==
Release dates and formats for African Electronic Dance Music
Region	Date	Format(s)	Edition(s)	Label	Ref.
South Africa	29 October 2021	Digital download; streaming	Standard	EL World Music	
