= 12 Views of Beatenberg =

Studio album by Beatenberg
- Released: 14 December 2018
- Genre: Worldbeat; indie pop
- Label: Island Records
- Producer: Ross Dorkin

Beatenberg chronology
The Hanging Gardens of Beatenberg (2014)	12 Views of Beatenberg (2018)	The Great Fire of Beatenberg (2024)

Singles from 12 Views of Beatenberg
- 1. "Aphrodite" Released: October 2018; 2. "Camera" Released: 25 October 2018; 3. "Ode to the Berg Wind" Released: 22 November 2018

12 Views of Beatenberg is the third album by South African indie pop band Beatenberg. It was released on 14 December 2018 by Island Records. The album includes singles "Camera" and "Ode to the Berg Wind," as well as "Aphrodite" a collaboration with African pop artist TRESOR. Upon release the album jumped to number four on the South African iTunes chart.

== Track listing ==
No.	Title	Length
1.	"Full Length Mirror"	2:53
2.	"Camera"	3:33
3.	"Aphrodite (ft. TRESOR)"	3:53
4.	"She's Not Like That"	3:13
5.	"Common Time"	3:58
6.	"Dark Glasses"	3:44
7.	"Stamina"	3:15
8.	"Ode Slowed"	1:35
9.	"M3"	4:17
10.	"Stamina Vignette"	0:48
11.	"Ode to the Berg Wind"	3:45
12.	"Naiomi"	3:10
13.	"Bowerbird"	3:16
14.	"Spirit Level"	3:10
15.	"I Won't Take No for an Answer"	3:14

== Personnel ==
- Matthew Field – production, vocals (1–7, 9–15), guitar, piano (1–2, 4–11, 13–15), keyboards (3, 12), bass guitar (1, 3), engineering (3)
- Ross Dorkin – production, bass guitar (2, 4–15), guitar (2), engineering (2, 12)
- Robin Brink – production, drums and percussion (1–2, 4–15), engineering (2, 12)
- Matt Colton – mastering
- Rhys Downing – engineering (1, 4–7, 9, 11, 13)
- Ash Workman – mixing (1–7, 9, 11–15)
- Jürgen von Wechmar – additional vocal engineering (1, 4, 6), additional vocals (14)
- TRESOR – featured vocals (3)
- Sally Minter – flute (7)
- Carin Bam – oboe (7)
- Charl van der Merwe – bassoon (7)
