= Sha Sha (singer) =

Zimbabwean-born singer (born 1994)

- Born: Charmaine Shamiso Mapimbiro; 13 July 1994 (age 31); Mutare, Zimbabwe
- Citizenship: Zimbabwean • South African
- Occupation: Singer-songwriter
- Years active: 2017–present
- Musical career
- Genres: Amapiano
- Instrument: Vocals
- Labels: Sony Music (former) Black Major

Charmaine Shamiso Mapimbiro (born 13 July 1994), professionally known as Sha Sha, is a Zimbabwean-born singer-songwriter from Mutare. Hailed by many as the "Queen of amapiano", her career began in 2011, at the age of 17 and later was discovered by Audius Mtawarira. She gained popularity for her collaborations with South African amapiano producers such as DJ Maphorisa and Kabza de Small.

Having signed a record deal with Blaq Boy Music, her debut Blossom EP, was released in 2019. She was awarded Best New International Act at the 2020 BET Awards.

== Early life and career ==
=== 1994–2017: Early years and career beginnings ===
Born in Mutare, Mapimbiro moved around Zimbabwe whilst growing up following her parents' separation, often residing with her grandmother or aunts. Her music journey began after joining the choir, subsequently taking vocal and piano lessons as a child.

Whilst a teenager, one of Mapimbiro's friends helped get one of Zimbabwe's biggest radio stations to play her music. This radio airplay was well-received and caught the attention of singer-songwriter Audius Mtawarira, who eventually became her mentor and helped her with improving her craft. With help from Zimbabwean musician Brian Soko in 2017, the duo were connected with South African musicians such Rouge and Priddy Ugly who featured her on their releases. During this time, Sha Sha also crossed paths with DJ Maphorisa through her cab driver. The two began working on ballads together and, with help from the latter, was able to meet future collaborators Mlindo the Vocalist and Don Laka.

=== 2018–2020: Blossom EP ===
Sha Sha was signed to DJ Maphorisa's label Blaqboy Music in 2018. After gaining prominence with her vocals on the songs "Akulaleki" by Samthing Soweto, "Nge Thanda Wena" by Mlindo The Vocalist and "We Mama" by Scorpion Kings, Sha Sha released her debut EP, Blossom on November 1, 2019.

On December 3, 2020, Sha Sha released the single "Woza".

=== 2021-present: I'm Alive ===
Towards the end of the June 2022, she signed a management deal with Black Major.

"Ungowami" featuring DJ Soa Mattrix was released on July 7, 2022, as album's lead single off her debut studio album I'm Alive which was set to be released on 26 August.

The album was released on September 23, 2022, in South Africa.

== Discography ==
=== Studio albums ===
- I'm Alive (2022)

=== Extended plays ===
- Blossom (2019)

== Singles ==
=== As lead artist ===
List of singles as lead artist, with selected chart positions and certifications, showing year released and album name
| Title | Year | Peak chart positions | Certifications | Album |
| Title | Year | ZA | Certifications | Album |
|---|---|---|---|---|
| "Woza" | 2020 | — | | |
| "Light Up" (Killer tunes, Sha Sha, Like Mike) | 2021 | — | | |
| "iPiano" (Sha Sha, Kamo Mphela featuring Felo Le Tee) | 2021 | — | | |
| "Ndawana" (Sha Sha, Kelvin Momo, Sykes) | 2024 | — | | Non-album single |
"—" denotes a recording that did not chart or was not released in that territory.

=== As featured artist ===
List of singles as featured artist, with selected chart positions and certifications, showing year released and album name
| Title | Year | Peak chart positions | Certifications | Album |
| Title | Year | ZA | Certifications | Album |
|---|---|---|---|---|
| "10K Yey'nkomo" (Aymos, Mas Musiq, Samthing Soweto featuring Sha Sha) | 2024 | — | | Impilo |
"—" denotes a recording that did not chart or was not released in that territory.

== Awards and nominations ==
| Award | Year | Recipient(s) and nominee(s) | Category | Result | Ref. |
|---|---|---|---|---|---|
| BET Awards | 2020 | Herself | Best New International Act | Won | |
| South African Music Awards | 2020 | "Akulaleki" (with Samthing Soweto, DJ Maphorisa and Kabza De Small) | Record of the Year | Nominated | |
| South African Music Awards | 2020 | "Akulaleki" (with Samthing Soweto, DJ Maphorisa and Kabza De Small) | Best Collaboration | Nominated | |
| South African Music Awards | 2020 | Love You Tonight (with MFR Souls, DJ Maphorisa and Kabza De Small) | Best Collaboration | Nominated | |
| South African Music Awards | 2020 | "Tender Love" (with DJ Maphorisa and Kabza De Small) | Best Collaboration | Nominated | |
| South African Music Awards | 2020 | Herself | Rest of Africa Artist | Nominated | |
| 2020 African Entertainment Awards USA | 2020 | Herself | Best Female Artist | Nominated | |
| MTV Africa Music Awards | 2021 | Herself | Best Breakthrough Act | Pending | |
| SA Amapiano Music Awards | 2021 | Herself | Best female amapiano artist | Nominated | |
| SA Amapiano Music Awards | 2021 | Herself | Best Amapiano Live Vocal Performance | Nominated | |
| SA Amapiano Music Awards | 2021 | Herself | Best Amapinao Vocalist | Nominated | |
| All Africa Music Awards | 2021 | Herself | Best Female Artist in South Africa | Nominated | |
| Zimbabwe Music Awards | 2022 | Herself | Best Dance | Nominated | |
| Zimbabwe Music Awards | 2022 | Herself | Best International Zimbabwean Artist | Nominated | |
| Zimbabwe Music Awards | 2022 | Herself | Best Female Artist | Nominated | |
