= Beautiful Madness =

Beautiful Madness may refer to:

- Beautiful Madness (album), 2026 album by Agnes
- "Beautiful Madness", 2020 song by Michael Patrick Kelly
- The Beautiful Madness, 2017 album by Tresor
- The Beautiful Madness EP, 2002 EP by Stabilo
