= Black Motion =

South African house duo (2009)

- Origin: Soshanguve, Gauteng
- Genres: House; Afro house
- Years active: 2010–present
- Labels: Sony; Universal
- Members: Thabo Roy Mabogwane; Kabelo Koma
- Past members: Murdah Bongz

Black Motion is a South African Afro House duo formed in Soshanguve, Gauteng and founded in 2010. The group is composed of Roy Thabo Mabogwane (Smol) and Kabelo Koma (Problem Child Ten83).

== History ==
Black Motion was formed in 2010, by Murdah Bongz (born Robert Mahosana), and Thabo (born Roy Thabo Mabogwane) they are from Soshanguve. That same year, they joined Faimos Entertainment and released their first single "Banane Mavoko" featuring Jah Rich, which gained them international recognition.

Their debut studio album Talking to the Drums was released in 2011. Produced by Smol and Murdah Bongz resulted to house record incorporated deep house, tribal house, tech house elements. It earned their first nominations for Best Dance Album, Best Group Album, Best Newcomer at the 2011 Metro FM Music Awards.

Aquarian Drums was released on December 10, 2012.

Their third studio album Fortune Teller was released in 2014. The album was certified gold in South Africa. At the 21st ceremony of South African Music Awards Fortune Teller won Best Dance Album. In 2016, they signed a record deal with Sony and began working on their fourth studio album. Ya Badimo was released on October 28, 2016, worldwide. The album won Best Dance Album at 23rd ceremony of South African Music Awards and was certified platinum by the Recording Industry of South Africa (RiSA). In early February 2017, they partnered with Ballantine Scotch Whisky on music campaign titled The Ballantine's Beat of Africa.

On September 21, 2018, they released a single "Joy Joy" featuring Brenden Praise. The song was certified platinum in South Africa.

Their fifth studio album Moya Wa Taola was released on October 5, 2018. It was nominated for Album of the Year and won Duo/Group of the Year, Best Dance Album at the 25th South African Music Awards.

Towards the end of 2019, they announced "Everything" featuring South African singer Afrotraction and trumpeter Mo-T. The song was released on November 15, 2020.

In early February 2020, they made collaboration on "Uwrongo" with Prince Kaybee, Shimza and Ami Faku. The song debuted no #1 on Radiomonitor Charts and was certified gold in South Africa. In May 2020, they announced "Don't Let Me Go" featuring Djeff, Malehloka and Miss P via Instagram. The song was released on May 15, 2020.

The Healers: The Last Chapter was released on September 24, 2020. It features Nokwazi, Ami Faku, Simmy, Sauti Sol, Sun-El Musician, TRESOR, and Kabza De Small. The album won Best Dance Album at 27th South African Music Awards. To further promote the album Red Bull Rendezvous launched a concert which was held Graskop, Mpumalanga.

Black Motion collaborated on "Siyabonga" with DJ Zinhle, Kabza De Small, Nokwazi released on November 26, 2021. The song debuted number 24 on both Local and International streaming charts.

DJ Murda departed from the group to launch his solo career, and was replaced by Problem Child Ten83 (born Kabelo Koma).

After a year hiatus the duo announced single "Ngoma" with Dr Moruti, Osaze featuring Mazet SA. The song was released on November 25, 2022.

In June 2023, their seventh studio album Rebirth of the Drum, was announced. It was released in September 2023.

"Takala Zwino" featuring Afrikan Roots, Buckz, Mörda was released on May 10, 2024. It entered Local Radio Chart Top 10 at number 10.

== Influence ==
The band has cited Miriam Makeba, Fela Kuti, Ladysmith Black Mambazo, Salif Keita and Hugh Masekela as their influence.

== Band members ==
=== Present members ===
- Thabo Roy Mabogwane
- Kabelo Koma

=== Past members ===
- Bongane Robert Mahosana

== Discography ==
=== Studio albums ===
- Talking To The Drums (2011)
- Aquarian Drums (2012)
- Fortune Teller (2014)
- Ya Badimo (2016)
- Moya Wa Taola (2018)
- The Healers: The Last Chapter (2020)
- Rebirth of the Drum (2023)
- The Cradle of Art (2024)

== Singles ==
=== As lead artist ===
List of singles as lead artist, with selected chart positions and certifications, showing year released and album name
Title	Year	Peak chart positions	Certifications	Album
Title	Year	ZA	Certifications	Album
"Banane Mavoko" (featuring Jah Rich) [Remixes]	2011	—		Non-album single
"Afrika Wo-Man" (UPZ, Black Motion featuring Theo Lawson)	2012	—		
"Addicted to Scars" (Kwesta, Black Motion featuring Emily Crystal)	2015	—		
"Nanka Lamaphoyisa" (DJ Fresca, Black Motion featuring Tuna)	2015	—		
"Kota" (Goodluck, Black Motion)	2015	—		Coke Studio South Africa: Season 1
"Anyway" (featuring Xoli M, Alie-Keyz)	2018	—		
"Joy Joy" (featuring Brenden Praise)	2018	—		
"Everything (Full Version)" (Black Motion, Afrotraction featuring Mo-T)	2020	—		The Healers: The Last Chapter
"Uwrongo" (Prince Kaybee, Shimza, Black Motion, Ami Faku)	2020	1	Platinum	
"Don't Let Me Go" (Djeff, Black Motion featuring Malehloka, Miss P)	2020	—		
"Another Man" (featuring Soulstar)	2020	—		
"Xxikiwawa" (DJ Fortee, Black Motion, Lady Du featuring Pholoso & DJ Khosto)	2021	—		
"Eloyi" (Nobuhle, Black Motion)	2021	—		IMVULA
"Memeza" (Vanco, Black Motion featuring Xelimpilo)	2021	—		
"Takala" (Black Motion, Afrikan Roots, Dj Buckz, Mörda)	2024	10		Non-album single
"Homebound" (Hedegaard, Black Motion)	2026	—		Non-album single
"—" denotes a recording that did not chart or was not released in that territory.

== Awards ==
=== Dance Music Awards South Africa ===
Year	Nominee / work	Award	Result	Ref.
2017	Black Motion	Best Live Act	Won	
2017	Black Motion	Best International Producer	Won	
2019	Moya Wa Taola	Album of the Year	Nominated	

=== DStv Mzansi Viewers Choice Awards ===
Year	Nominee / work	Award	Result	Ref.
2017	"Imali"	Favourite Song of the Year	Nominated	
2017	Black Motion	Favourite Music Artist/Group	Nominated	

=== Metro FM Music Awards ===
Year	Nominee / work	Award	Result	Ref.
2025	Themselves	Best Duo/Group	Pending	

=== Mzansi Kwaito and House Music Awards ===
Year	Nominee / work	Award	Result	Ref.
2021	"Uwrongo" - Prince Kaybee, Shimza, Black Motion, Ami Faku	Best Collaboration	Nominated	
2021	"Uwrongo" - Prince Kaybee, Shimza, Black Motion, Ami Faku	Most Voted Song	Nominated	

=== IMV Awards ===
Year	Nominee / work	Award	Result	Ref.
2026	"Monateng"	Best African Music Video	Won	
2026	"Monateng"	Original Recording	Won	
2026	"Monateng"	Best Costume	Won	

=== South African Music Awards ===
Year	Nominee / work	Award	Result	Ref.
2015	Fortune Teller	Best Dance Album	Won	
2017	Ya Badimo	Best Dance Album	Won	
2019	Moya Wa Taola	Album of the Year	Nominated	
2019	Moya Wa Taola	Best Dance Album	Won	
2019	Moya Wa Taola	Duo/Group of the Year	Won	
2021	The Healers: The Last Chapter	Best Dance Album	Won	
2025	The Cradle of Art	Best Produced Album	Nominated	
2025	The Cradle of Art	Best Engineered Album	Nominated	
2025	The Cradle of Art	Best Dance Album	Nominated	
2025	"Takala"	Best Collaboration	Won	
2025	"Takala"	Best Duo/Group	Won	
