= Tugela Fairy =

Studio album by Simmy
- Released: November 16, 2018
- Label: EL World Music; Sony
- Producer: Sanele Sithole

Simmy chronology
Tugela Fairy (2018)	Tugela Fairy (Made of Stars) (2020)

Tugela Fairy is a debut album studio by South African singer-songwriter Simmy, released November 16, 2018 through El World Music and Sony. Production was handled by Sun-El Musician.

The album was certified Platinum by the Recording Industry of South Africa (RiSA).

Professional ratings
Review scores
Source	Rating
AllMusic	5/10 stars

== Commercial performance ==
Tugela Fairy was certified Platinum by the Recording Industry of South Africa (RiSA).

== Awards ==
At the 25th South African Music Awards the album was nominated for Best Afro Pop album and Newcomer of the Year.

Year	Nominee / work	Award	Result
2019	Tugela Fairy	Best Afro Pop album	Nominated
2019	Tugela Fairy	Newcomer of the Year	Nominated

== Track listing ==
All tracks are written by Simmy.

Standard Edition
No.	Title	Length
1.	"Kwa-Zulu (Intro)"	3:18
2.	"Ubala" (featuring Sun-El Musician)	4:08
3.	"Incwadi Encane" (featuring S-Tone)	4:49
4.	"Hamba Juba"	5:38
5.	"Umahlalela"	5:21
6.	"Ngiyesaba"	5:10
7.	"Nawe"	4:24
8.	"Njalo (Ufikile)"	5:15
9.	"Vele Kungcono"	5:23
10.	"Ngonile"	4:03
11.	"Lashona Ilanga"	3:10
12.	"Ngiyavuma (Outro)"	2:12

== Certifications ==
Region	Certification	Certified units/sales
South Africa (RISA)	Platinum	40,000^{‡}
^{‡} Sales+streaming figures based on certification alone.

== Release history ==
Release dates and formats for Tugela Fairy
Region	Date	Format	Version	Label	Ref.
South Africa	October 16, 2018	CD; digital download; streaming	Standard	EL World Music; Sony	
