= Akanamali =

2017 single by Sun-El Musician featuring Samthing Soweto

Single by Sun-El Musician featuring Samthing Soweto

from the album Africa to the World
- Released: May 21, 2017
- Recorded: 2016–2017
- Genre: Electronic
- Length: 5:22
- Label: EL World Music; Sony
- Songwriters: Sanele Tresure Sithole, Mdolomba Samkelo, Dibodu Karabo
- Producer: Sanele Sithole

Sun-El Musician singles chronology
"Akanamali" (2017)	"Sengimoja" (2017)

Music video
- "Akanamali" on YouTube

"Akanamali" is a single by South African DJ and music producer Sun-El Musician featuring South African singer-songwriter Samthing Soweto. EL World Music and Sony released it on 21 May 2017, as the lead single from his debut studio album, Africa to the World (2018).

It reached number one on Shazam charts, becoming the first single from the album to reach summit of the chart. The song's lyrics discuss a lady who runs away with a guy who has no money, to finds her happiness. "Akanamali" was certified Platinum by the Recording Industry of South Africa (RiSA).

At the 24th ceremony of South African Music Awards the song won three awards includes: Best Collaboration, Highest Airplay Composer and Highest Airplay Song.

== Background and release ==
"Akanamali" marks first collaboration with Samthing Soweto. The song was produced by Sun-El Musician.

Sun-El Musician released Extended Mix version of the song on 17 July 2021.

== Composition ==
The song lasts for 5 minutes and 22 seconds, composed using common time in the key D♭ minor, having a tempo of 105 beats.

"Akanamali" addresses a lady who runs away with a guy who has no money, to find her happiness.

== Music video ==
The music video for "Akanamali" was released in 2018, filmed in Soweto, South Africa.

== Live performances ==
The song was first performed live at Huawei Joburg Day in 2018 by Samthing Soweto and Sun-El Musician.

== Charts ==
=== Weekly charts ===
Chart (2017)	Peak position
South Africa (EMA)	1

== Certifications ==
Region	Certification	Certified units/sales
South Africa (RISA)	Platinum	20,000^{‡}
^{‡} Sales+streaming figures based on certification alone.

== Accolades ==
At the 24th South African Music Awards "Akanamali" won three accolades.

Year	Nominee / work	Award	Result
2018	"Akanamali"	Best Collaboration	Won
2018	"Akanamali"	Highest Airplay Composer	Won
2018	"Akanamali"	Highest Airplay Song	Won

== Release history ==
Region	Date	Format	Version	Label	Ref.
South Africa	21 May 2017	Digital download	Original	EL World Music	
