= Amagents =

Single by Samthing Soweto
- Released: June 24, 2022
- Genre: Afro-soul
- Length: 4:43
- Label: Youbuntu
- Songwriter: Samkelo Lelethu Mdolomba

Samthing Soweto singles chronology
"Weekend" (2020)	"Amagents" (2022)

"Amagents" is a single by South African singer and songwriter Samthing Soweto, released on June 24, 2022 by Youbuntu. It debuted number one in South Africa. The song was certified gold by the Recording Industry of South Africa (RiSA).

== Background ==
Samthing first teased the song "Amagents" on his Instagram account in March 2022. After many delays the song was released 2 months later on June 24, 2022.

== Commercial performance ==
It debuted at number one in South Africa. The song was certified gold by the Recording Industry of South Africa (RiSA), 20 days after its initial release day.

== Charts ==
Chart performance for "Amagents"
Chart (2022)	Peak position
South Africa (RISA)	1

== Release history ==
Region	Date	Format	Version	Label	Ref.
Worldwide	June 24, 2022	Digital download	Original	Youbuntu	
