= The Hanging Gardens of Beatenberg =

2014 studio album by Beatenberg

Studio album by Beatenberg
- Released: 15 August 2014
- Recorded: June 2013 – March 2014
- Studio: Sunset Studios
- Genre: Worldbeat; indie pop
- Length: 1:05:00
- Label: Universal Africa
- Producer: Ross Dorkin

Beatenberg chronology
Farm Photos (2009)	The Hanging Gardens of Beatenberg (2014)	12 Views of Beatenberg (2018)

Singles from The Hanging Gardens of Beatenberg
- 1. "Echoes" Released: April 2012; 2. "Chelsea Blakemore" Released: 19 August 2013; 3. "Pluto (Remember You)" Released: November 2013; 4. "Rafael" Released: July 2014

The Hanging Gardens of Beatenberg is the second album by South African band Beatenberg. It was self-produced and released on 15 August 2014 on Universal Music Africa. Thematically, the album captures thoughts of love and light-hearted subjects The Hanging Gardens of Beatenberg was recorded from June 2013 till March 2014 at Sunset Studios in Stellenbosch and vocalist Matthew Field's home studio.

The Hanging Gardens of Beatenberg includes Beatenberg’s first hit single, “Chelsea Blakemore”, as well as follow-up singles "Pluto (Remember You)" and "Rafael". The album and singles generally received positive reviews from critics. It peaked at number 2 on the South African iTunes chart and was awarded the South African Music Awards prestigious Album of the Year for 2015. At the end of 2015 the album was certified gold by Recording Industry of South Africa, for selling more than 15,000 copies in South Africa.

== Reception ==
Professional ratings
Review scores
Source	Rating
PLATFORM	86/100

The Hanging Gardens of Beatenberg peaked at number 2 on the South African iTunes Charts, following the success of their collaboration with DJ Clocks on his track "Pluto (Remember You)". The single became the longest running South African number-one single ever, with seventeen weeks on the local radio charts.

In South Africa, the reviews were favourable. Andy Petersen of PLATFORM said, "it is anthemic and riveting". The satirist Justin Nurse praised Beatenberg's second album, noting their influences and "familiarity that is so infectious". SA Music Scene’s Vicky Jankiewicz praised it as a distinctive pop album with an “African flavour [in] their rhythms and beats". HillyDilly critic Cole Ryan hailed it as “undoubtedly one of the best indie-pop [albums] presented [in 2014]" The We-Are-Awesome blog wrote that it was a "Paul Simon-esque ballads [with] references to suburban nostalgia and an unashamed pop sensibility". The award-winning BEARD.fm blog said "you can’t help but feel happy and picture people in old 1950’s outfits in a shebeen".

== Track listing ==
All songs written by Matthew Field except where noted.

No.	Title	Length
1.	"Rafael"	4:10
2.	"Beauty Like a Tightened Bow"	3:26
3.	"Chelsea Blakemore"	3:37
4.	"Pluto"	5:52
5.	"Southern Suburbs"	3:57
6.	"Scorpionfish"	3:28
7.	"Ithaca"	4:49
8.	"Cavendish Square"	4:02
9.	"Facebook Apologia"	3:41
10.	"Echoes"	3:36
11.	"All About Me"	3:09
12.	"Cape To Rio"	4:17
13.	"The Prince of the Hanging Gardens"	4:44
Total length:		55:18

'Deluxe edition' bonus tracks
No.	Title	Length
14.	"Achievement"	3:25
15.	"Thinking About You (cover; written by Frank Ocean)"	4:33
16.	"Bend the Rules"	4:14
Total length:		01:05:00

== Personnel ==
- Matthew Field - vocals, guitar, piano
- Ross Dorkin - bass guitar
- Robin Brink - drums
