= Emakhaya =

Studio album by Mlindo the Vocalist
- Released: September 21, 2018
- Recorded: 2017–2018
- Genres: Afropop; afrobeats; soul; house music; alternative R&B
- Length: 60:51
- Labels: BlaqBoy Music; Sony Music Africa
- Producers: DJ Maphorisa, Young DLC

Mlindo the Vocalist chronology
Emakhaya (2018)	Lindokuhle (2022)

Singles from Emakhaya
- 1. "AmaBlesser" Released: January 28, 2018; 2. "Macala" Released: October 17, 2018

Emakhaya is the debut studio album by South African singer and songwriter Mlindo the Vocalist. It was released on September 21, 2018, by BlaqBoy Music and Sony Music Africa. The album is a mixture of afropop, soul, house and alternative R&B.

== Background ==
After the release of his debut single, "AmaBlesser", in January 2018, Mlindo confirmed that he was working on an album and estimated that it would be released later in 2018. On September 14, he announced the album's title and revealed its cover art as it was made available to pre-order and pre-save on iTunes.

== Commercial performance ==
Emakhaya was certified gold in South Africa.

=== Industry awards ===
Year	Nominee / work	Award	Result	Ref.
2019	Emakhaya	Best Afro Pop Album	Nominated	
2019	Emakhaya	Best Produced Album	Nominated	
2019	Emakhaya	Newcomer of the Year	Nominated	

== Release and promotion ==
The album launch was held on September 21, 2018, at The Orbit in Braamfontein, Johannesburg.

== Singles ==
"AmaBlesser" was released on January 28, 2018, as the album's lead single. The album reached number-one on the Radiomonitor South Africa, and also was atop on the iTunes Local Single Chart the following day.

"Macala" was released as the second single on October 17, 2019. It also peaked number-one on both Entertainment Monitor Africa and the Radiomonitor South Africa. The single had a major contribution on the album's 45 million streams.

== Track listing ==
All tracks are written by Mlindo the Vocalist, except where noted.

Emakhaya
No.	Title	Length
1.	"Ancestors"	3:57
2.	"Emakhaya"	3:44
3.	"AmaBlesser"	3:28
4.	"Egoli"	4:01
5.	"Usbahle"	4:02
6.	"Cold Summers"	4:13
7.	"Lay'ndlini"	4:10
8.	"Wamuhle"	3:59
9.	"Imoto"	4:32
10.	"Usukulude"	3:52
11.	"Nge Thanda Wena"	2:36
12.	"Mosadi"	4:47
13.	"Lengoma"	3:27
14.	"Macala"	4:33
15.	"AmaBlesser"	3:29
Total length:		60:51

Radio edit
No.	Title	Length
16.	"Macala (Radio Version)"	4:32
Total length:		4:32

== Personnel ==
- Mlindo the Vocalist – vocals
- Sjava – featured artist on vocals (track 4)
- Vyno Miller – featured artist on vocals (tracks 6 and 12)
- Shwi No Mtekhala – featured artist on vocals (track 8)
- Sha Sha – featured artist on vocals (track 11)
- Thabsie – featured artist on vocals (tracks 14 and 16)
- Kwesta – featured artist on vocals (tracks 14 and 16)
- Sfeesoh – featured artist on vocals (tracks 14 and 16)
- Rayvanny – featured on vocals (track 15)
- DJ Maphorisa – production
- Choole Munyati – composition
- Thabo Ngubani – composition
- Bongani Sikhukula – composition
- Howard Goward – composition
- Darlington Chikwewo – composition
- Tshegofatso Teffo - composition
- Tshego AMG - Guitars and Production
