= To the World & Beyond =

Studio album by Sun-El Musician
- Released: December 4, 2020
- Length: 2:39:00
- Label: EL World Music
- Producer: Sanele Sithole; Kenza; Mthunzi; Claudio

Sun-El Musician chronology
Africa to the World (2018)	To the World & Beyond (2020)	African Electronic Dance Music (2021)

To the World & Beyond is the second studio album by South African DJ Sun-El Musician, released on December 4, 2020 by EL World Music.

The album was certified Platinum by the Recording Industry of South Africa (RiSA).

== Background ==
On November 24, 2020, Sun-El Musician announced his double album release date.

== Accolades ==
To the World & Beyond was nominated for Best Dance Album, Male Artist of the Year and won Best Live Audio Visual Recording at 27th South African Music Awards.

Year	Nominee / work	Award	Result
2021	To the World & Beyond	Best Live Audio Visual Recording	Won
2021	To the World & Beyond	Male Artist of the Year	Nominated
2021	To the World & Beyond	Best Dance Album	Nominated

== Artwork ==
The album's artwork features Sun-El Musician upper body, wearing traditional attire. Its background is composed by planets. The cover was designed by visual artist Alexis Chivir-ter Tsegba.

== Track listing ==
Disc 1
No.	Title	Length
1.	"Ngiwele" (ft. Afriikan Papi, Just Bheki)	6:18
2.	"Kwalula" (ft. Simmy, Sino Msolo)	4:29
3.	"Goduka" (ft. Ami Faku, Mthunzi)	3:40
4.	"Superhero" (ft. Bongeziwe Mabandla)	3:10
5.	"Amasosha" (ft. Mthunzi, Sino Msolo)	3:33
6.	"Uhuru" (ft. Azana)	4:37
7.	"Ilanga" (ft. Simmy, Ami Faku)	3:54
8.	"Never Never" (ft. Nobuhle)	6:06
9.	"Ithemba" (ft. Vernotile)	4:29
10.	"Ubomi Abumanga" (ft. Msaki)	5:32
11.	"Mandinaye" (ft. Ami Faku)	6:57
12.	"Without You" (ft. Black Motion, Miss P)	5:20
13.	"Proud of You" (ft. Omi Kobi, Sino Msolo)	6:27
14.	"Fire" (ft. Sauti Soul)	3:47
15.	"Mngani Wam" (ft. Laliboi)	5:36
16.	"Fly Again" (ft. Kwesta)	5:38

Disc 2
No.	Title	Length
1.	"Abazali" (ft. Umzulu Phaqa)	3:50
2.	"Salanabani" (ft. Bongeziwe Mabandla, Claudio, Kenza)	5:51
3.	"Time Wasted"	5:04
4.	"Lengane" (ft. Simmy)	5:39
5.	"Buyisa" (ft. Mandisa)	4:19
6.	"Chasing Summer" (ft. Claudio, Kenza, Msaki)	7:11
7.	"Van Demme"	5:26
8.	"Love is blind" (ft. Dafro, Simmy)	6:35
9.	"Mr Right" (ft. EL Zintle)	5:07
10.	"Midlife Crisis" (ft. Linos Rosetta)	7:15
11.	"Opelenge"	3:57
12.	"To the World"	6:49
13.	"No Drama"	3:58
14.	"Call Me" (ft. Zolani Mahola)	3:21
15.	"Garden" (ft. Julia Church)	4:49
Total length:		2:39:00

== Commercial performance ==
To the World & Beyond garnered over 7.5 million streams on Spotify a day before release.

== Critical reception ==
=== Year-end lists ===
Select year-end rankings of To the World & Beyond
Critic/Publication	List	Rank	Ref.
Apple Music	Apple Music Top Albums of 2021 - South Africa	16	

== Release and promotion ==
The album standard edition was released on December 4, 2021.

A Journey to the World & Beyond (Uhuru Space Force) Virtual Concert was released an hour before the album release.

"Ubomi Abumanga" featuring South African singer Msaki was released as second single and accompanying music video on May 28, 2020.

"Never Never" featuring South African singer Nobuhle was released as third single on December 3, 2021.

== Certifications ==
Region	Certification	Certified units/sales
South Africa (RISA)	Platinum	30,000^{‡}
^{‡} Sales+streaming figures based on certification alone.

== Release history ==
Release dates and formats for To the World & Beyond
Region	Date	Format(s)	Edition(s)	Label	Ref.
South Africa	4 December 2020	Digital download; streaming	Standard	EL World Music	
