= Shimza =

South African DJ and music producer

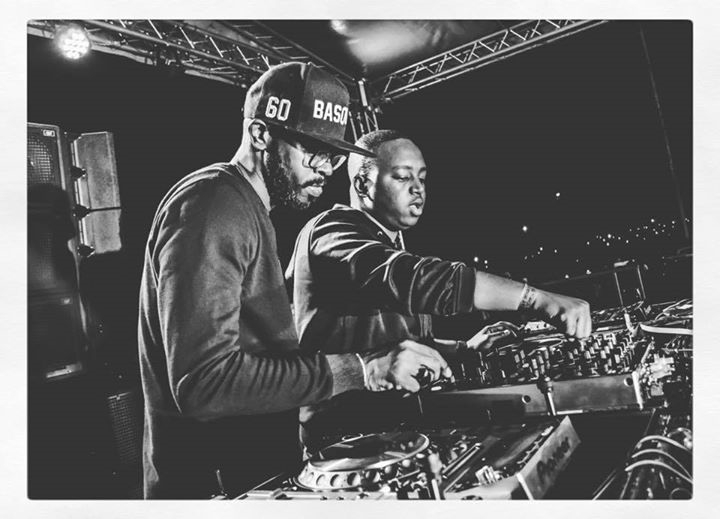
Image of Dj Shimza in action

Kholofelo Ashley Raphala, professionally known as Shimza, is a South African DJ and music producer. Born and raised in Tembisa, Shimza developed a musical interest at the age of 15, and signed a recording deal with Soulistic Music and released his debut studio album Shimuzic, in 2015.

In February 2020, Shimza appeared on a collaboration "Uwrongo" with Black Motion, Prince Kaybee, and Ami Faku. The song debuted No. 1 on Radiomonitor Charts and was certified Gold by the Recording Industry of South Africa.

Shimza released extended play Sunset in Pretoria, on June 19, 2026.

== Discography ==
=== Studio albums ===
- Shimuzic (2015)
- One Man Show (2016)
- Eminence (2019)
- Kimberly (2021)

=== Extended plays ===
- Dreaming (2024)
- Sunset in Pretoria (2026)

=== As lead artist ===
List of singles as lead artist, with selected chart positions and certifications, showing year released and album name
Title	Year	Peak chart positions	Certifications	Album
Title	Year	ZA	Certifications	Album
"Higher" (featuring Nobuhle)	2022	—		Non-album single
"Darling" (with Aloe Blacc)	2024	—		Non-album single
"Parachute" (featuring Rachel Chinouriri)	2024	—		Non-album single
"Bado" (Shimza, CamelPhat, Idd Aziz)	2024	—		Non-album single
"Citadelle" (Shimza, Maline Aura)	2024	—		Non-album single
"Skill of Love" (Alex Wann, Shimza)	2025	—		Non-album single
"Fire Fire" (Shimza, AR/CO, Kasango)	2025	—		Non-album single
"Falling" (Shimza, Elderbrook)	2026	—		Non-album single
"No Shape Without You" (Shimza, LevyM)	2026	—		Non-album single
"All the People" (Shimza, Ayra Starr and Alok)	2026	—		Non-album single
"—" denotes a recording that did not chart or was not released in that territory.

== Achievements ==
=== DStv Mzansi Viewers Choice Awards ===
Year	Nominee / work	Award	Result	Ref.
2017	Himself	Favourite DJ	Nominated	
2022	Himself	Favourite DJ	Won	

=== Miami Electronic Dance Music Awards ===
Year	Nominee / work	Award	Result	Ref.
2026	"Fire Fire"	Song of the Year	Won	

=== Mzansi Kwaito and House Music Awards ===
Year	Nominee / work	Award	Result	Ref.
2021	"Uwrongo" - Prince Kaybee, Shimza, Black Motion, Ami Faku	Best Collaboration	Nominated	
2021	"Uwrongo" - Prince Kaybee, Shimza, Black Motion, Ami Faku	Most Voted Song	Nominated	

=== South African Dance Music Awards ===
Year	Nominee / work	Award	Result	Ref.
2019	Himself	Best Male DJ	Won	
2019	One Man Show	Best Festival	Won	
