= Brenden Praise =

South African singer-songwriter and music producer

- Born: Brenden Praise Ledwaba; February 5, 1994 (age 32); Graskop, Mpumalanga, South Africa
- Genres: Soul; Rnb; House; Gospel
- Instruments: vocals; piano
- Years active: 2013–present
- Spouse: Mpumi Ledwaba (m. 2016)
- Website: brendenpraise.com

Brenden Praise Ledwaba (born February 5, 1994) known by the stage name of Brenden Praise, is a South African singer-songwriter and music producer. Ledwaba rose to prominence after contested on Idols South Africa season 9 and became a runner-up.

== Early life ==
Brenden Praise Ledwaba was born on February 5, 1994, in small town of Graskop, Mpumalanga. Ledwaba develop musical interest at the age of six and began piano lessons at the age of 12, prior bass guitar and drums lessons.

He attended Graskop Primary School, and matriculated at Sybrand Van Niekerk High School in Sabie, Mpumalanga. Brenden enrolled at Emendy Sound and Music Technology College in Sound Engineering in 2013.

== Career ==
Praise auditioned for the ninth season of Idols South Africa, successfully earning a place in the live rounds of the contest, before losing as the runner-up in November 2013.

Ledwaba debut studio album Feel so Good was released June 28, 2019.

His studio album Mhalamhala, was released April 6, 2023. It earned him a nomination for Best Contemporary Faith Album at the 29th ceremony of South African Music Awards.

In December 2023, Ledwaba appeared on a collaboration "Mysterious Ways", with Mörda for The Color Purple Soundtrack.

== Discography ==
=== Studio albums ===
- Feel So Good (2019)
- Mhalamhala (2023)
- The GAP (2025)

=== Extended plays ===
- Misava (with Vanco) (2022)
- The Gift, Vol. 1 (with Free 2 Wrshp) (2024)

=== Guest appearances ===
Title	Year	Other artist(s)	Album
"You Are"	2025	Nontokozo Mkhize	Lindiwe

== Singles ==
=== As lead artist ===
List of singles as lead artist, with selected chart positions and certifications, showing year released and album name
Title	Year	Peak chart positions	Certifications	Album
Title	Year	ZA	Certifications	Album
"Love Comes Easy"	2017	—		Non-album single
"Ku Hava" (featuring Kid-X)	2018	—		Non-album single
"Journey To Cairo" (featuring Black Motion)	2020	—		Non-album single
"Mukutsuri" (featuring Mpho.Wav)	2021	—		Non-album single
"God You Keep on Blessing Me"	2023	—	Gold	The Gift, Vol. 1
"Miracles" (Senior Oat, Brenden Praise, Tshego AMG)	2024	—		Non-album single
"—" denotes a recording that did not chart or was not released in that territory.

=== As featured artist ===
List of singles as featured artist, with selected chart positions and certifications, showing year released and album name
Title	Year	Peak chart positions	Certifications	Album
Title	Year	ZA	Certifications	Album
"Joy Joy" (Black Motion featuring Brenden Praise)	2018	1	RiSA: Platinum	Moya Wa Taola
"Moya" (Mpho.Wav featuring Brenden Praise)	2022	—		Non-album single
"Horns in the Sun" (DJ Kent featuring Brenden Praise, Mörda, Mo-T)	2023	7		Weekent Sun Sets
"—" denotes a recording that did not chart or was not released in that territory.

== Personal life ==
Brenden married Mpumi Ledwaba in 2016.

== Awards and nominations ==
=== Grammy Awards ===
Year	Nominee / work	Award	Result	Ref.
2024	"The Color Purple"	Best compilation soundtrack for visual media	Pending	

=== South African Music Awards ===
Year	Nominee / work	Award	Result	Ref.
2021	Mhalamhala	Best Contemporary Faith Album	Nominated	
2024	"Horns in the Sun"	Motsepe Foundation Record of the Year	Nominated	
2024	The Gift Vol. 1	Best Contemporary Faith Music Album	Nominated	
2026	The GAP	Best Contemporary Faith Music Album	Nominated	
