= The Beautiful Madness =

Studio album by TRESOR
- Released: May 26, 2017
- Genre: Pop, Afro pop, Disco, Funk
- Length: 67:00
- Language: French; Zulu; English
- Label: VII Recordings x Universal Music

TRESOR chronology
VII (2015)	The Beautiful Madness (2017)	Nostalgia (2019)

Singles from The Beautiful Madness
- 1. "Speed of Sound" Released: 2016; 2. "Remedy" Released: May 2017

The Beautiful Madness is the second studio album by Congolese-born singer TRESOR. It was released on 26 May 2017 through his label VII Recordings. The album features South African artists Da Capo, The Kiffness, Shotgun Fakes, Hugh Masekela and the Mahotella Queens. The 16-track album won Best Pop Album and was nominated for Album of the Year and Best Male Artist at the 24th South African Music Awards four months after its release.

== Background ==
The album was mostly inspired by African 80s dance music and written while TRESOR was on the road, on long flights and in hotels around Africa and Europe. TRESOR explained:

After I released my debut album VII, straight away I started writing and producing new songs to keep my head focused in the midst of adapting to my new life and limelight. My wildest dreams had come true with my debut album as I started to travel the world to perform and also topping charts in Europe. It was inspired by the madness that followed VII. Life was moving so fast! I was exhausted and could hardly keep up with all the great things that were happening with my music career while traveling different cities. So, I wrote this record to keep the fire inside alive and to celebrate the beauty of seeing my wildest dreams beautifully unfold before my eyes while appreciating everything that came with it. This is... THE BEAUTIFUL MADNESS.

TRESOR joined the British band Bastille on their South African tour as part of the promotion for the album.

== Singles ==
The song "Speed of Sound" was released in 2016 and featured South African producer Da Capo. The song was nominated for best video at the 1st annual SA Dance Music Awards.

The album's single "Remedy" was released in early May 2017 and was number #19 on the Top 20 most played songs in South Africa. The music video was released on 21 April 2017 and was shot in Cape Town over two days in a studio. TRESOR and director Yash Lucid came up with the concept afor the video. The music video was also aired exclusively on Trace Urban. TRESOR said:

The concept of the video is inspired by 80's Disco Pop colours and fashion. We wanted to bring a hip African feel to it so we added the Panstula dancers who made the video magical! The music video takes you back to the time of the likes of Chicco Twala and Brenda Fassie... from styling to the whole aesthetic! We achieved our vision perfectly.

"Midnight Sun" was the final single that was released from The Beautiful Madness. The song featured Hugh Masekela. TRESOR said:

I am thrilled to finally share this song with the world! It's such an honour to have the legendary Hugh Masekela on this song. When I approached him early this year about him rapping on the song like he did on his 1984 dance Smash 'Don’t Go Lose It Baby' He was like, 'My boy... for you I'll do something better' and 'Midnight Sun' was born!

== Track listing ==
The Beautiful Madness
No.	Title	Length
1.	"Beyond Redemption"	4:07
2.	"Tidal Wave"	4:00
3.	"Speed of Sound" (featuring Da Capo)	7:16
4.	"Nirvana"	4:53
5.	"Midnight Sun"	3:30
6.	"Remedy"	3:52
7.	"Wonder"	3:51
8.	"Don't Shun Away" (featuring Mahotella Queens)	4:17
9.	"Sweetest Fall"	4:19
10.	"Feels"	3:45
11.	"Never Give Up" (featuring Shotgun Fakes)	3:50
12.	"Sleeping on God"	4:03
13.	"Evergreen" (featuring the Kiffness)	3:24
14.	"Wildheart"	3:36
15.	"She Makes My World Shine"	4:28
16.	"Midnight Sun" (featuring Hugh Masekela)	3:31
Total length:		67:00

== Accolades ==
Awards and nominations for Nostalgia
Year	Ceremony	Category	Result	Ref.
2018	South African Music Awards	Album of the Year	Nominated	
2018	South African Music Awards	Best Pop Album	Won	
2018	South African Music Awards	Best Male Artist	Nominated	

== Release history ==
List of release dates, showing region, formats, label, editions and reference
Region	Date	Format(s)	Label	Edition(s)
Various	26 May 2017	CD; digital download; streaming	VII Recordings	Standard
