= Da Capo (music producer) =

South African DJ and producer

- Born: Nicodimas Sekheta Mogashoa; 9 June 1992 (age 34); Seshego, South Africa
- Occupations: DJ; Record producer
- Awards: Full list
- Musical career
- Also known as: DJ Da Capo
- Origin: Johannesburg
- Genres: Afro House; Afro Tech; Deep House
- Instruments: Keyboard; synthesizer; percussions
- Labels: Soulstic Music; Genesys Entity

Nicodimas Sekheta Mogashoa (born 9 June 1992), professionally known as Da Capo (/dɑː ˈkɑːpoʊ/ dah KAH-poh; from the Italian musical phrase), is a South African DJ and record producer. Born and raised in Seshego, Da Capo rose to prominence after remixing the single "Pretty Disaster" by Moneoa. He then signed a recording deal with Soulstic Music and his studio debut album Indigo Child (2017), which was certified double platinum by the Recording Industry of South Africa (RiSA).

== Career ==
Nicodimas Sekheta Mogashoa was born on 14 August 1992, Seshego township Zone 3, Polokwane, South Africa. After completed his matric, he studied for media and communication at University of Limpopo but dropped out. His musical career began as a rapper and later developed interest on house music.

After he signed a record deal with Soulstic Music, Indigo Child was released on 8 December 2017, in South Africa. It features GoodLuck, Berita, Wanda Baloyi, Jackie Queens, Renee Thompson, Soulsta, Miss Dippy, Tshepo King, and Darian Crouse. The album was certified double platinum and garnered over 36.5 million streams on digitally streaming platforms.

He established independent record label Genesys Entity and released his EP Genesys in May 2020. "Moyo Wanagu" featuring BATUND was released as EP's lead single.

"Light House" was released on 3 September 2021, by TRESOR featuring Da Capo and Sun-El Musician.

In the fourth quarter of 2021, he collaborated with Gallo to remix "Imbizo", which appeared on compilation album Music is Forever, released on 17 December 2021.

=== 2023-present: Bakone, Indigo Child II, Aquatone Cotton Fabric ===
"Molili" featuring Batundi, Nana Atta and Lokua Kanza released on 23 June 2023, as lead single of his Bakone EP released on 14 July. "Molili" reached No 29 at Phalaphala FM Top 30 Chart.

Bakone was released on 14 July 2023. The EP is an afro-house record fused with afro-tech and deep house elements. Capo calloborated with Batundi, Nana Atta and Lokua Kanza, Da Africa Deep. Same day, Capo was announced as Sghubhu cover star by Apple Music.

In February 2024, Capo announced two upcoming albums Indigo Child II, and Aquatone Cotton Fabric.

== Artistry ==
In an interview with The Playground, Da Capo said that his musical career was inspired by Jimpster, Nick Holder, Quinton Harris.

== Awards and nominations ==
=== Dance Music Awards ===
Year	Nominee / work	Award	Result	Ref.
2018	Indigo Child	Album of The Year	Won	
2019	Himself	Best Producer	Nominated	
2019	"Found You" featuring Berita	Best Music Video	Nominated	

=== DJ Awards ===
Year	Nominee / work	Award	Result	Ref.
2019	Himself	Best Afro House Artist	Won	

=== Limpopo Awards ===
Year	Nominee / work	Award	Result	Ref.
2018	"Found You"	Best Dance/House Single	Nominated	

=== South African Music Awards ===
Year	Nominee / work	Award	Result	Ref.
2021	"Yehla Moya"	Remix of the Year	Won	
2021	"Yehla Moya"	Best Collaboration	Nominated	
2022	"Uhuru" Sun-El Musician, Azana, and Da Capo	Remix of the Year	Won	
2022	"Mama"	Remix of the Year	Nominated	

== Discography ==
- Touch (2013)
- Indigo Child (2017)
- Genesys (2020)
- Return to the beginnings (2021)
- Bakone EP (2023)
- Indigo Child II: Love & Frequency (2025)

=== As lead artist ===
List of singles as lead artist, with selected chart positions and certifications, showing year released and album name
Title	Year	Peak chart positions	Certifications	Album
Title	Year	ZA	Certifications	Album
"Visualise"	2014	—		Non-album single
"Ki Lo Fe?" (featuring KALINÉ)	2016	—		Non-album single
"Found You" (featuring Berita)	2017	—		Indigo Child
"Afrikaans" (featuring Tshepo King)	2019	—		Non-album single
"Yauna" (Darque, Da Capo featuring Idd Aziz)	2019	—		Non-album single
"Afrofuturism" (Kojo Akusa, Da Capo)	2019	—		Non-album single
"QUEDATE"	2020	—		Non-album single
"Better" (featuring Jethro Tait)	2022	—		Non-album single
"Soze" (Earful Soul, Da Capo featuring Sia Mzizi)	2023	—		Non-album single
"Secret ID" (Moojo, Da Capo)	2023	—		Non-album single
"5 ESTRELLAS"	2024	—		Non-album single
"Mama Kosa" (Atsou, Da Capo, Emmanuel Jal)	2024	—		Non-album single
"Phakade Lami" (Da Capo, Mawhoo, Soul Star)	2025	—		Indigo Child II: Love & Frequency
"My Confession" (Da Capo, Elaine)	2025	—		Indigo Child II: Love & Frequency
"—" denotes a recording that did not chart or was not released in that territory.

=== As featured artist ===
List of singles as featured artist, with selected chart positions and certifications, showing year released and album name
Title	Year	Peak chart positions	Certifications	Album
Title	Year	ZA	Certifications	Album
"iMali" (Earful Soul, featuring Da Capo, Mthandazo Gatya)	2026	—		Non-album single
"—" denotes a recording that did not chart or was not released in that territory.

=== Guest appearances ===
Title	Year	Other artist(s)	Album
"No Rainbow"	2021	Msaki	Platinumb Heart Beating
"Someday"	2024	Miči	Feelings
"Woko Dance"	2024	Mpho.Wav, Lyrik Shoxen	Book of Wav
"Into The Night"	2026	Sun-EL Musician, Jordan Arts	Under The Sun
