= Music Is Forever =

EP by Various artists
- Released: December 17, 2021
- Genre: Afro-Pop
- Length: 17:00
- Label: Gallo Record Company
- Producer: Black Coffee

Music Is Forever is an extended play by various artists, released on December 17, 2021, by Gallo Records. It features Sun-El Musician, Nobuhle, Da Capo, Muzi and others.

== Background and recording ==
On December 15, 2021, Gallo Records announced the extended play titled Music Is Forever.

Production was handled by Black Coffee as executive producer.

== Release ==
"Too Late for Mama" was released by Mpho Sebina on October 4, 2021.

== Track listing ==
Standard Edition
No.	Title	Writer(s)	Producer (s)	Length
1.	"Too Late for Mama" (Mpho Sebina)	Sello Chicco Twala	Kenza, Favi Motsemme, Black Coffee	4:07
2.	"Imbizo (Da Capo Touch)" (Phuzekhemisi and Da Capo)			6:01
3.	"Vulindlela" (Sun-El Musician featuring Nobuhle)			4:11
4.	"Yakhal'Inkomo" (Winston Mankunku Ngozi and Muzi)			2:51
Total length:				17:00

== Release history ==
Release dates and formats for Music Is Forever
Region	Date	Format(s)	Edition(s)	Label	Ref.
South Africa	17 December 2021	Digital download; streaming	Standard	Gallo Record Company	
