= Bamthathile =

Single by Sun-El Musician featuring Mlindo the Vocalist

from the album Africa to the World
- Released: February 23, 2018
- Length: 4:00
- Label: EL World Music
- Producer: Sun-El Musician

"Bamthathile" is a single by South African DJ and music producer Sun-El Musician featuring South African singer Mlindo the Vocalist, second single from his debut studio album Africa to the World (2018). It was released on February 23, 2018, by EL World Music. The song was certified double platinum by the Recording Industry of South Africa (RiSA).

== Track listing ==
Digital download and streaming

1. "Bamthathile" – 4:00

== Certifications ==
Region	Certification	Certified units/sales
South Africa (RISA)	2× Platinum	40,000^{‡}
^{‡} Sales+streaming figures based on certification alone.

== Release history ==
Region	Date	Format	Version	Label	Ref.
South Africa	February 23, 2018	Digital download	Original	EL World Music	
