= Rumble in the Jungle (DJ Maphorisa, Kabza De Small and Tresor album) =

RUMBLE IN THE JUNGLE

Studio album by Kabza De Small & DJ Maphorisa and TRESOR
- Released: April 9, 2021
- Recorded: 2020
- Genre: Amapiano
- Length: 99:00
- Language: Swahili; French; English; Zulu; Lingala
- Label: Jacquel Entertainment Group; Piano Hub; Blaq Boy Music
- Producer: Kabza De Small & DJ Maphorisa

Singles from RUMBLE IN THE JUNGLE
- 1. "Funu" Released: 11 December 2020; 2. "Folosade" Released: March 25, 2021

RUMBLE IN THE JUNGLE is an amapiano collaborative album by TRESOR, DJ Maphorisa and Kabza De Small. It was released on 9 April 2021 and features guest appearances from local South African musicians such as Tyler ICU, Mas Musiq and the Cape Town band Beatenberg. The 14-track album is composed of TRESOR's vocals, which are combined from genres such as amapiano, Kwassa kwassa, rumba, salsa, bubblegum and Afrobeats. The album also alternates between Swahili, French, English, Zulu and Lingala.

== Background ==
The album shares its name with the iconic boxing match between George Foreman and Muhammad Ali which took place in 1974 at the stadium Stade Tata Raphaël Kinshasa, Democratic Republic of Congo (formerly known as Zaire). TRESOR explaining the album to TimesLIVE:

After DJ Maphorisa heard TRESOR singing on a campaign they were working on, he approached him for a collaboration album in March 2020 when lockdown started. TRESOR wrote all the songs from his home studio and sent DJ Maphorisa and Kabza De Small ideas and they went back and forth except for songs such as "Angelina", "Mali Mali" and "Cherie" which were written when TRESOR heard the beats at DJ Maphorisa’s home studio.

The cover artwork for Rumble in the Jungle was designed by visual artist and sculptor, Hedi Xandt, who has worked with Beyoncé on The Lion King: The Gift soundtrack. He created a modern artefact depicting The Scorpion Kings and TRESOR as the legendary trinity, Memnon.

== Critical reception ==
=== Year-end lists ===
Select year-end rankings of RUMBLE IN THE JUNGLE
Critic/Publication	List	Rank	Ref.
Pan-African Music	The 50 best albums of 2021	1	

== Release and promotion ==
In May 2021, the trio unveiled a mural for Rumble In The Jungle in celebration of Africa Month. The mural was painted by Dbongz and is located in Maboneng, Johannesburg. TRESOR explaining about the mural:

This particular album is special for me because it represents a bold statement of pride in the diversity of our culture as Africans, embracing the rich musical landscape of our home. We went back to the source and tapped into sounds from all over the continent for this album.

=== Singles ===
On 11 December 2020, the trio released the album's second single, "Funu". The single topped the charts and peaked #1 on Good Hope FM's Top 10 SA House Chart after a month of its release. The music video for the song was later released on 1 February 2021 and was directed by Kyle White. Explaining the music video:

"Funu" is an exuberant and colourful celebration of African dance and culture that follows a group of friends gathered in an ornate Johannesburg mansion. The juxtaposition of the mansion's colonial stylings with the cast's vibrant wardrobe and lively choreography, feeds off the uplifting, dance-rooted nature of "Funu".

They released the single "Folasade" in March 2021. Folasade is a name of Yoruba origin, which means "honored with a crown" when loosely translated". The music video was released on 26 March 2021. The music video's visuals were directed by Nkululeko Lebambo and Tresor Riziki and were shot in a dim-light studio brightened by the use of fluorescent lights.

TRESOR revealed that the first song "Stimela" on the album was hugely influenced by the late legendary Hugh Masekela. Explaining the jazz icon was more than just an inspiration to him but a dear friend to whom he was very close:

Stimela is a beautiful storyteller-type of song which was inspired mainly by Bra Hugh. I was very close to him. He'd always tell me stories about mineworkers going back home only to find their families scattered, maybe their wives married to someone else. It's a beautiful, sad love story. This song is not a remake of the original version, it's a whole new song that's inspired by mineworkers and their love story. Me and Bra Hugh used to spend a lot of time together, he was my friend.

== Track listing ==
Rumble in the Jungle
No.	Title	Writer(s)	Producer(s)	Length
1.	"Stimela"	Tresor Riziki	Kabelo Motha; Themba Sekowe	7:47
2.	"Funu"	T. Riziki	K. Motha; T. Sekowe	7:21
3.	"La Vie Est Belle"	T. Riziki	K. Motha; T. Sekowe	7:29
4.	"Folasade"	T. Riziki	K. Motha; T. Sekowe	7:45
5.	"Soro"	T. Riziki	K. Motha; T. Sekowe	7:13
6.	"Dust in the Wind" (featuring Beatenberg)	T. Riziki; Matthew Field	K. Motha; T. Sekowe; M. Field; Robin Brink; Ross Dorkin	6:44
7.	"Angelina"	T. Riziki	K. Motha; T. Sekowe	7:06
8.	"Cherie" (featuring Tyler ICU)	T. Riziki	K. Motha; T. Sekowe; Austin Baloyi	6:36
9.	"Mali Mali" (featuring Mas Musiq)	T. Riziki	K. Motha; T. Sekowe; Thabo Ngubane	5:27
10.	"Neriya"	T. Riziki	K. Motha; T. Sekowe	7:56
11.	"Limbisa Nga"	T. Riziki	K. Motha; T. Sekowe	6:02
12.	"Malaika"	T. Riziki	K. Motha; T. Sekowe	6:53
13.	"Starry Night"	T. Riziki	K. Motha; T. Sekowe	7:27
14.	"Love like A Weapon"	T. Riziki	K. Motha; T. Sekowe	6:46
Total length:				99:00

== Release history ==
List of release dates, showing region, formats, label, editions and reference
Region	Date	Format(s)	Label	Edition(s)	Ref.
Various	28 February 2020	digital download; streaming	Jacquel entertainment Group; Piano Hub; Blaq Boy Music	Standard	
