= Msaki =

South African singer and songwriter

- Born: Asanda Lusaseni Mvana; 31 December 1988 (age 37); East London, Eastern Cape, South Africa
- Education: Rhodes University (MFA)
- Occupations: Composer; Songwriter; Singer
- Musical career
- Origin: Johannesburg
- Genres: Indie Folk
- Instruments: Vocals; Guitar
- Years active: 2008–present
- Label: One Shushu Day Artistry

Asanda Lusaseni Mvana (born 31 December 1988) known professionally as Msaki, is a South African composer, singer, and songwriter. Born and grew up in East London, during her childhood she was involved in musical activities. Her career in music began in 2008, at the age of 20, when she was a member of alternative rock band while attending college.

Her debut Extended Play Nal'ithemba (2013) and debut solo studio album Zaneliza: How The Water Moves (2016), which was nominated for Best Adult Contemporary Album.

== Early life ==
Asanda Lusaseni Mvana was born in East London, Eastern Cape in 1988. Her father was a DJ and grandmother was a music composer. She attended Cathcart High School and Nelson Mandela University before dropping out after one year. Mvana attended Rhodes University and obtained Master of Fine Arts degree.

In 2008, she Joined The Patience alternative rock group based in East London and electro-experimental band Johnny Cradle based in Cape town. Following year in 2009, she was guitarist and lead vocalist for Kate and I duo formed in Grahamstown.

In 2012, Msaki attended music school in North Carolina in the USA.

== Career ==
She established her own record label, One Shushu Day Artistry and released her debut Extended Play Nal'ithemba, in 2013 produced by Cobus Van Dyk. In 2016, she won ovation at 7th Standard Bank Ovation Awards and Gold Award First Place at Cape Town Fringe. Her single "Imfama Ziyabona" released in 2016, debuted on Metro FM Charts for 19 consecutive weeks.

In June 2017, her debut album Zaneliza: How The Water Moves was released in South Africa. The album was co-produced by Nduduzo Makhathini. To further promote her album she performed at National Art Festival. At the 23rd ceremony of South African Music Awards Zaneliza: How The Water Moves was nominated for Best Adult Contemporary Album.

Msaki teamed up with South African DJ Prince Kaybee on a single "Fetch Your Life", released on February 8, 2019. The song debuted number one on iTunes Dance charts. In November 2019, her single "Pearls To Swine" featuring TRESOR and Kid X was released, bagged nomination for Best Produced Video. She co-written "Undithatha Kancinci" single by Kelly Khumalo.

Msaki was featured on Rhythms of Zamunda (Music Inspired By: Coming 2 America), released in March 2021.

In October 22, Msaki released double single of "Fetch Your Life II" and "Mntakababa" featuring Kabza De Small and Focalistic. That same month she made a collaboration on platoon compilation album African Lullabies Pt. 1. In November 19, her double project Platinumb Heart, was released.

In December 2021, Msaki headlined to 14th Annual Mzansi Fela Festival along with Amanda Black, Zoë Modiga, and Mandisi Dyantyisa was held in State Theatre, Guateng.

In January 2022, Msaki collaborated on a song "Own The Future" with Goodluck, Shekhinah, and YoungstaCPT. She also received a nomination for Female Vocalist of the Year at Global Music Awards Africa 2022.

In early February, she was featured on Home Session by Apple Music.

In February 6, Msaki unveiled six pieces of her artwork titled Platinumb Heart of Love In Protest and performed at Nirox Sculpture park to promote her double album.

Msaki and Tubatsi Moloi released joint album Synthetic Hearts on March 10, 2023.

In September 2023, Msaki was featured on "Piece of Ground", a song written by Jeremy Taylor and originally recorded by Miriam Makeba on DJ Kenzhero and Tha_Muzik's jazz compilation album What Is Wrong With Groovin. The album, produced by DJ Kenzhero and Tha_Muzik, who had previously hosted a radio show of the same name on Kaya FM until 2021, reimagined songs by South African and American musicians including Nina Simone, Makeba, Brenda Fassie, Lebo Mathosa, and Letta Mbulu, with bassist Vimbs Mavimbela serving as creative lead, and featured vocalists Msaki and others. OkayAfrica included the album among "10 best South African jazz albums right now", with the magazine writing that "Piece of the Ground" "would make Miriam Makeba glow".

Msaki and Sun-El Musician collaborated on a single "Amandla", released on November 3, 2023.

Towards the end of April 2024, Msaki and Tubatsi Moloi announced the album Synthetic Hearts (Part II). Two singles "Imini Yesithembiso" and "Green to Gold" were released on March 13, 2024.

"Izinto Zobomi" was released on May 4, 2024, as second single. The album was released on May 24, 2024.

In October 2024, Msaki announce Camagu in Symphony: 10 Years of Gratitude concert which was held at the SunBet Arena on December 12.

=== 2025-present: New music, Entropy EP ===
Msaki announced their collaborative extended play Entropy with Jesse Clegg, and released "Wayside Lover" featuring Sjava as ep leads single on September 19.

The extended play was scheduled for release on January 23, 2026. Entropy was released on February 27, 2026.

=== Television ===
In early November 2021, she made her screen debut as guest judge on Idols South Africa season 17.

In June 2024, Msaki joined uShuni Womhlaba, SABC 1 singing competition reality television show as a judge.

== Filmography ==
Television
Year	Film	Roles
2021	Idols South Africa	Guest judge
2024	uShuni Womhlaba	Judge

== Discography ==
=== Studio albums ===
- Nal'ithemba (2013)
- Zaneliza: How The Water Moves (2016)
- Platinumb Heart (2021)

=== Collaborative albums ===
- Synthetic Hearts (2023) (Msaki and Tubatsi)

=== Collaborative EP's ===
- Entropy (2026) (Msaki and Jesse Clegg)

=== As lead artist ===
List of singles as lead artist, with selected chart positions and certifications, showing year released and album name
Title	Year	Peak chart positions	Certifications	Album
Title	Year	ZA	Certifications	Album
"Fetch Your Life II"	2021	—		Platinumb Heart
"Mntakababa" (featuring Kabza De Small, Focalistic)	2021	81		Platinumb Heart
"Subaleka" (Msaki, Mpho Tubatsi)	2022	—		Synthetic Hearts
"Come In" (Msaki, Mpho Tubatsi)	2023	—		Synthetic Hearts
"Zibonakalise" (Msaki, Mpho Tubatsi)	2023	—		Synthetic Hearts
"Amandla" (Msaki, Sun-El Musician)	2023	—		Non-album single
"Imini Yesithembiso" (Msaki, Mpho Tubatsi)	2024	—		Synthetic Hearts (Part II)
"Green to Gold" (Msaki, Mpho Tubatsi)	2024	—		Synthetic Hearts (Part II)
"Let Me" (NNAVY, Karun, Msaki, Hendrick Sam)	2024	—		Closer
"Feel" (NNAVY, Karun, Msaki, Hendrick Sam)	2024	—		Closer
"Raise Your Glass" (NNAVY, Karun, Msaki, Hendrick Sam)	2024	—		Closer
"Unozala" (Kenza, Ami Faku, Msaki featuring Sun-El Musician)	2024	—		Non-album single
"You're Light" (Sun-El Musician, Msaki, Karyendasoul)	2025	—		Non-album single
"Naliya" (Batundi, Msaki, TRESOR)	2025	—		Non-album single
"Wayside Lover" (Jesse Clegg, Msaki featuring Sjava)	2025	—		Entropy
"Untimely Disclosure" (Jesse Clegg, Msaki)	2026	—		Entropy
"—" denotes a recording that did not chart or was not released in that territory.

=== As featured artist ===
List of singles as featured artist, with selected chart positions and certifications, showing year released and album name
Title	Year	Peak chart positions	Certifications	Album
Title	Year	ZA	Certifications	Album
"Love Colour Spin" (Mobi Dixon featuring Msaki)	2015	—		Tribal Soul (Special Edition)
"Sondela" (TRESOR featuring Msaki)	2019		3× Platinum	Nostalgia
"Fetch Your Life" (Prince Kaybee featuring Msaki)	2019		6× Platinum	Re Mmino
"Bomi Abumanga" (Sun-El Musician featuring Msaki)	2020	—	RiSA: 2× Platinum	To the World & Beyond
"Khusela" (Kabza De Small featuring Msaki)	2022	1		KOA II Part 1
"Jacaranda" (Karyendasoul featuring Msaki)	2023			We Live 4 Our Music
"Moon" (Justin Micheal Williams, Global Soul Collective featuring Msaki	2023	—		Non-album single
"Umusa" (Nomfundo Moh featuring Msaki, Cassper Nyovest)	2024	—		Twenty Four

== Achievements ==
Msaki awards and nominations
Awards and nominations
Award	Wins	Nominations
Basadi in Music Awards	1	2
Clout Africa Awards	1	1
South African Music Awards	2	5
Mzansi Kwaito and House Music Awards	1	2

Totals (Note: Certain award groups do not simply award one winner. They acknowledge several different recipients, have runners-up, and have third place. Since this is a specific recognition and is different from losing an award, runner-up mentions are considered wins in this award tally. For simplification and to avoid errors, each award in this list has been presumed to have had a prior nomination.)
- Wins: 5
- Nominations: 10

=== Amapiano Music Awards ===
Year	Nominee / work	Award	Result	Ref.
2023	Herself	Friends of AmaPiano	Cancelled	

=== Basadi in Music Awards ===
Year	Nominee / work	Award	Result	Ref.
2022	Herself	Songwriter of the Year	Nominated	
2023	Herself	Songwriter of the Year	Won	

=== Clout Africa Awards ===
Year	Nominee / work	Award	Result	Ref.
2022	Platinumb Heart Open	Best Alternative Album	Won	

=== Metro FM Music Awards ===
Year	Nominee / work	Award	Result	Ref.
2025	"Umusa"	Best African Pop Song	Pending	

=== Mzansi Kwaito and House Music Awards ===
Year	Nominee / work	Award	Result	Ref.
2024	Herself	Best House Artist	Won	
2024	"Marry Me" - Black Motion featuring Msaki	Best House single	Nominated	

=== South African Music Awards ===
Year	Nominee / work	Award	Result	Ref.
2022	"No Rainbow" featuring Da Capo	Best Collaboration	Nominated	
2022	Herself	SAMPRA Artist of the Year	Nominated	
2022	Platinumb Heart Open	Female Artist of the Year	Won	
2022	Platinumb Heart Open	Best Produced Album of the Year	Nominated	
2022	Platinumb Heart Open	Best Adult Contemporary Album	Won	
