= Afrotraction =

South African musician (born 1983)

- Born: Mzwandile Moya; April 16, 1983 (age 43); Nelspruit, South Africa
- Origin: Nelspruit, South Africa
- Genres: Neo soul; R&B; smooth jazz
- Occupations: Singer, Record producer
- Instruments: Vocals; Piano; Bass; Guitar
- Years active: 2000–present
- Label: Independent
- Website: afrotraction.co.za (defunct)

Mzwandile Moya (born April 16, 1983), known by his stage name Afrotraction, is a South African R&B and neo soul musician and producer. Born and raised in Nelspruit, his professional musical career began in 2006. Moya comes from a musical family and his love for music was triggered at an early age. Moya is a self-taught pianist and bassist singing in Siswati in neo soul and R&B styles, and he has worked with many South African artists of different genres.

His studio album For The Lovers (2014) earned him best R&B/Soul/Reggae Album at the 21st South African Music Awards.

Moya's fifth studio album Relationships (2017) became his best-selling album. It was preceded by 5 singles; "Ngiphelele", "Ngeke K’lunge", "Ngimtholile", "Angeke", "Imali Yamalobolo".

== Career ==
Growing up Moya was a keyboard player at his church, before venturing into music and signing a recording deal with Electromode in 2006 as a record producer.

Africa. Love. Music was released on October 7, 2022.

== Discography ==
=== studio albums ===
- Soul Deep (2009)
- Soulfully Yours (2011)
- For The Lovers (2014)
- Love & Respect (2016)
- Relationships (2017)
- The Gospel Of Afrotraction: Moya Movement (2020)
- The Launch of JazzYano (2021)
- Africa. Love. Music (2022)
- We Own Sunday (2025)

=== studio EP's ===
- Love Over Dose (L.O.D EP) (2019)

== Awards ==
Year	Award	Category	Results	Ref.
2013	14th Metro FM Awards	Best Afro-pop Album For the Lovers	Won	
2018	21st South African Music Awards	Best R&B/Soul/Reggae Album for their album For the Lovers	Won	
