= Samthing Soweto =

South African Singer

- Born: Samkelo Lelethu Mdolomba Madikizela; 21 January 1988 (age 38); Soweto, Johannesburg, South Africa
- Occupation: Singer
- Musical career
- Genres: Afro-pop; soul; R&B; acapella; amapiano
- Instrument: Vocals
- Years active: 2010–present
- Label: Independent
- Formerly of: The Soil; The Fridge
- Website: www.samthingsoweto.co.za

Samkelo Lelethu Mdolomba (born 21 January 1988), known professionally as Samthing Soweto, is a South African singer and songwriter. Samthing is best known for his vocals on Sun-El Musician's song "Akanamali" and his number 1 single on spotify "Akulaleki".

Following his departure of the group The Soil, Mdolomba released his debut album, This N That Without Tempo (2010), which fuses a capella and soul. He then departed from his debut album's sound as he introduced fusions of Afro pop, and R&B for his second album, Isphithiphithi (2019), which became certified platinum by the Recording Industry of South Africa RiSA.

== Life and career ==
=== Early life ===
Samkelo Lelethu Mdolomba was born and raised in Protea North, Soweto, a township of Johannesburg, South Africa. He is the third of four children, who were all raised by his single mother. Mdolomba was moved to his grandmother in the Eastern Cape, but was later moved back to Protea North caused by substandard issues. In an interview with The Best T in The city, he said, "She [his mother] thought maybe an upbringing in the EC would benefit me but it didn’t. I lost weight, not that my granny wasn’t looking after me, I cried every day…it was too much for me so she came back after a year".

Mdolomba left school in eighth grade as he had problems of dyslexia . In an interview on Metro FM, he stated: "School was really tough for me. It was a nightmare but I went back nonetheless." At the age of 15, Mdolomba started using Mandrax, and was also involved in crime-related actions in order to escape difficulties he faced at home. He was sent to a youth detention centre for armed robbery where he started making music full-time. This eventually helped him break out of the life of crime and drug addiction.

=== The Soil ===
After being released from the youth detention centre and eventually returning to school, Samthing Soweto began taking interest to a school choir. The choir was led by Buhlebendalo Mda, who was later one of the vocalists of the a cappella group The Soil. While attending the choir's performance, Mdolomba wanted to start a group [The Soil], describing it as: "A group that sings songs, songs that we can afford to sing. And I say afford, because everything out there was programmed or played with instruments and we couldn't afford that, so I was like let's use our voices".

After the formation of The Soil, the group met the head of the entertainment company Native Rhythms, Sipho Sithole, who was keen on signing them to his label. After signing and beginning their first project, Mdolomba began learning how to produce music and released his debut solo studio album, This N That Without Tempo, and also started making music with a nu jazz band, The Fridge. Mdolomba left both parties due to contractual disputes and creative differences.

==== Influence ====
Prior to meeting members of The Soil, Mdolomba was arrested for public robbery in Avalon cemetery at Klipriviersoog, Soweto. His sentence was suspended and he was sent to a youth detention center in Krugersdorp, West Rand. Mdolomba was encouraged to sing by his fellow inmates, who sang using a prison style of chanting called Gumba Fire, which includes singing Kwaito songs in a cappella format. This became a major influence in him establishing the group The Soil, in terms of both working in a group, and using bare vocals as a musical instrument. He also stated that the male choral group Ladysmith Black Mambazo had an influence on him in venturing to a cappella.

=== The Fridge ===
After leaving The Soil, Mdolomba continued with the nu jazz group, The Fridge. The band consisted of a drummer, Ade Omotade, bassist Muthusi and Mdolomba as the vocalist; it gained success in playing on local shows and festivals, including The Loft at Melville, Gauteng. The group released their debut EP, Bass Drum & Sam, in 2011 through digital media. The Fridge disbanded in 2015 due to two members, Thusi and Ade, relocating.

=== 2010–2021: Solo projects and Isphithiphiti ===
In 2013, Mdolomba appeared on poet Makhafula Vilakazi's South African poetry album, I Am Not Going Back to the Township, credited both as a guest vocalist and producer. Following his debut studio album, This N That Without Tempo, which was independently released on 6 August 2010, Mdolomba released his debut EP, Eb'suku, on 4 January 2014. In support of Eb'suku, Mdolomba headlined the 2014 Joy of Jazz Festival, representing "Sounds Of Democracy". He also performed at the Rocking The Daisies Festival held on 2–5 October 2014 at Cape Town, Western Cape. That same year, he composed and performed the title sequence of the drama series Rhythm City, and also appeared on the soundtrack of the drama film Otelo Burning.

In 2015, Mdolomba appeared on the Coca-Cola-sponsored live-music television series Coke Studio Africa, alongside artist Spoek Mathambo and bassist Shane Cooper. In May 2017, Mdolomba made his superior breakthrough with his feature on the Sun-El Musician song "Akanamali". The song received South African Music Awards for Best Collaboration, SAMPRA highest airplay, and SAMRO highest airplay at the 24th South African Music Awards.

On 20 September 2019, his second studio album, Isphithiphithi, was released. The album broke the record of the highest number of users "pre-adding" the album on the streaming service Apple Music South Africa, before the release of the album; the record was previously held by singer Billie Eilish.

"I am surprised and excited, I didn't know there was another record to be broken, which is a great feat for me. I thank all my fans for being so supportive and loyal."

— Daily SUN

He released four singles for the album, including "Akulaleki" (featuring Sha Sha) which peaked number-one on the local Apple Music chart. The song "Akulaleki" was certified gold. At the 26th ceremony of South African Music Awards, Isphitiphithi received the Best Afro Pop Album award.

=== 2022–present: Upcoming projects ===
In early January 2022, he announced his upcoming live album which is set to be recorded on the second quarter of 2022.

In March 2022, Soweto teased "Amagents" single on his Instagram account. The song was released on June 24, 2022. It debuted number one in South Africa. The song was certified gold in South Africa.

In July 2022, Soweto embarked on his Now or Never tour, which included two dates.

== Tours ==
- Now or Never (2022)

== Discography ==
=== Studio albums ===
List of albums, with selected details, sales figures and certifications
Title	Album details	Certifications
This N That Without Tempo	Released: 6 August 2010; Label: Independent; Formats: digital download, CD	
Isphithiphithi	Released: 20 September 2019; Label: Independent; Formats: digital download, CD	RiSA:Platinum
Danko!	Released: 11 December 2020; Label: Youbuntu; Formats: digital download, CD	

== Singles ==
=== As lead artist ===
List of singles as lead artist, with selected chart positions and certifications, showing year released and album name
Title	Year	Peak chart positions	Certifications	Album
Title	Year	ZA	Certifications	Album
"Get Down" (Fka Mash, Samthing Soweto)	2018	—		Non-album single
"Omama Bomthandazo" (featuring Makhafula Vilakazi)	2019			Isphithiphithi
"Akulaleki" (featuring Sha Sha, DJ Maphorisa, Kabza De Small)	2019	—		Isphithiphithi
"Weekend" (Samthing Soweto, De Mthuda)	2020	—		
"Amagents"	2022		RiSA: Gold	Non-album single
"10K Yey'nkomo" (Aymos, Mas Musiq, Samthing Soweto featuring Sha Sha)	2024	—		Impilo
"—" denotes a recording that did not chart or was not released in that territory.

== Awards and nominations ==
Awards	Year	Category	Results	Ref.
SAMA 26	2020	Best Afro-Pop album	Won	
SA AmaPiano Music Awards	2021	Best AmaPiano Live Vocal Performance	Nominated	
SA AmaPiano Music Awards	2021	Best Amapinao Vocalist	Nominated	
SA AmaPiano Music Awards	2021	Best AmaPiano Collaboration	Nominated	
All Africa Music Awards	2022	Best Male Artist in Africa Inspirational Music	Pending	
