= Beatenberg (band) =

South African Afro pop band

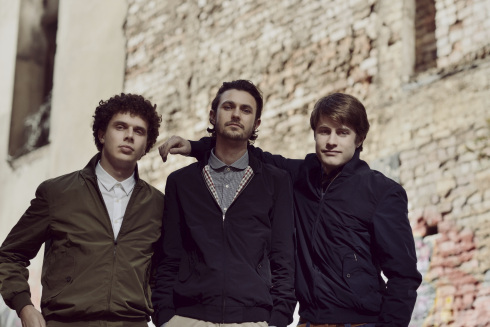
- From left to right Ross Dorkin, Robin Brink, Matthew Field

Background information
- Origin: Cape Town, South Africa
- Genres: Pop; Afro house; Afropop
- Years active: 2008–present
- Labels: Universal Africa; Island
- Members: Matthew Field; Robin Brink; Ross Dorkin
- Website: beatenberg.ochre.store

Beatenberg is a South African band based in Cape Town, composed of Matthew Field, Robin Brink, and Ross Dorkin. The group signed with Universal Music Group label in 2012. They gained national attention in 2014 from their collaboration with the artist DJ Clock with "Pluto (Remember You)", which became the number one popular song on South African radio for over 19 consecutive weeks.

Their second album The Hanging Gardens of Beatenberg (2014), generated hit singles including "Beauty Like a Tightened Bow", "Scorpionfish", and "Pluto (Remember You)". Their third album 12 Views of Beatenberg (2018), after the release of singles "Camera", "Ode to the Berg Wind" and "Aphrodite", in collaboration with the singer Tresor.

== Band members ==
- Matthew Field (vocals, guitar)
- Robin Brink (drums)
- Ross Dorkin (bass, keys)

== Discography ==
=== Albums ===
- Farm Photos (2009)
- The Hanging Gardens of Beatenberg (2014)
- 12 Views of Beatenberg (2018)
- On the way to Beatenberg EP (2022)
- The Great Fire of Beatenberg (2024)

=== Singles ===
- "Echoes" (2012)
- "Chelsea Blakemore" (2013)
- "Pluto (Remember You)" (2013)
- "Rafael" (2014)
- "Camera" (2018)
- "Ode to the Berg Wind" (2018)
- "Aphrodite" (2018)

=== Music videos ===
- "Pluto (Remember You)"
- "Chelsea Blakemore"
- "Rafael"
- "Southern Suburbs"
- "Beauty Like A Tightened Bow"
- "Camera"
- "Ode to the Berg Wind"
- "Aphrodite" feat. TRESOR
- "Stamina"

== Awards and nominations ==
Awards	Year	Category	Nominated work	Result
21st SAMA	2015	Album of the Year	The Hanging Gardens of Beatenberg	Won
21st SAMA	2015	Best Pop Album	The Hanging Gardens of Beatenberg	Won
21st SAMA	2015	Duo or Group of the Year	Beatenberg	Won
21st SAMA	2015	SAMPRA Award	"Pluto (Remember You)"	Won
21st SAMA	2015	Best Selling Mobile Music Download	"Pluto (Remember You)"	Won
21st SAMA	2015	Best Selling Ring-Back Tone	"Pluto (Remember You)"	Won
21st SAMA	2015	Best Selling Full-Track Download	"Pluto (Remember You)"	Won
21st SAMA	2015	Newcomer of the Year	Beatenberg	Nominated
21st SAMA	2015	Best Collaboration	Beatenberg and DJ Clock	Nominated
