= The Soil =

South African band

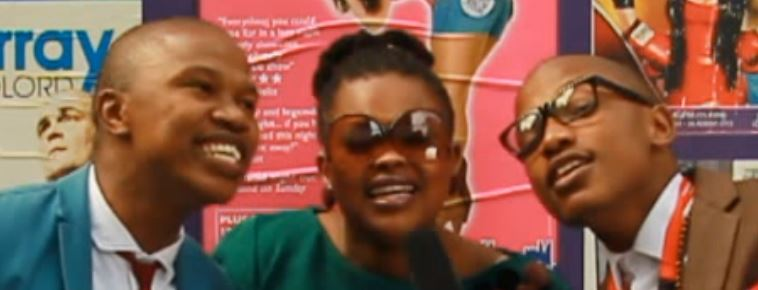
- The Soil performing at the Edinburgh Festival Fringe 2013

Background information
- Origin: Soweto, Johannesburg, South Africa
- Genres: Kasi soul, a cappella
- Years active: 2003–present
- Labels: Sony Music Entertainment Africa, Native Rhythms
- Members: Luphindo Ngxanga; Ntsika Ngxanga; Theo Matshoba
- Past members: Samthing Soweto; Buhlebendalo Mda

The Soil is a South African a cappella group from Soweto founded in 2004, consisting of the lead singer Ntsika Ngxanga, beatboxer Luphindo, and vocalist Theo Matshoba.

The band eponymous debut LP The Soil (2011), which became certified Platinum by the Recording Industry of South Africa (RiSA).

== History ==
=== 2003-2010: Formation ===
Its inception came about in 2003 when all the members met in Tikelo Secondary School during jam sessions. Back then the group was known as 'Particles of the Soil' and consisted of more than 4 members. As years passed, some members departed due to other engagements. In 2010, the group was down to four members: Buhlebendalo Mda (vocalist), Ntsika Ngxanga (main composer and vocalist), Luphindo (beatboxer and vocalist) & Samkelo Lelethu Mdolomba, commonly known by his stage name, Samthing Soweto. Mdolomba was involved during the recording process of the group's first album, however, due to contractual disputes and creative differences, Samkelo decided to leave and form the contemporary jazz group The Fridge where he served as the lead vocalist.

=== 2010-2017: The Soil, Reflections: (Live In Joburg), Nostalgic Moments, Echoes of Kofifi ===
In 2011, The Soil released their self-titled debut LP The Soil which achieved platinum status, selling over 50,000 copies. On October 7, 2013, their debut live album Reflections: (Live In Joburg) was released and won Best R&B/Soul/Reggae Album at 2014 South African Music Awards. Their second album Nostalgic Moments was released digitally on iTunes on 15 September 2014. It was made available for hard copy purchase on 22 September 2014. Nostalgic Moments received positive review from music critics. The album includes guest appearances by Ladysmith Black Mambazo and hip hop artist Khuli Chana. At the 14th ceremony of Metro FM Awards, the band won Best Produced Album (Nostalgic Moments) and Best Duo/Group. In 2015, the band was nominated for Best International Act: Africa at BET Awards 2015.

On October 21, 2016, their third studio album titled Echoes of Kofifi was released in South Africa and met positive review from music critics. The album was nominated at South African Music Awards in the Best Engineered Album, Best duo/group of the Year and Best Afro-pop Album categories. The band further promoted album with Nostalgic Moments Tour in July 2014 at Emalahleni.

In June 2020, the band made their decision to take an indefinite hiatus to pursue solo projects.

=== 2021-present: Reimagined, concert tour ===
In November 2021, the band was reportedly working on an album.

The band embarked on A Decade With The Soil Tour on December 3, the tour included two dates that ran through December 2021.

In early September 2023, band vocalist Buhlebendalo Mda was reportedly left the group, replaced by Theo Matshoba.

"Thandwa Ndim" featuring Thee Legacy was released on October 13, 2023, as albums lead single.

The band released their studio album Reimagined, on February 23, 2024. Reimagined is the continuation of their kasi soul, jazz, and gospel influences music style.

The Soil is set to embark on their Reimagined Tour at Star Theatre, Cape Town in March 9, with the tour concluding on October 26, 2024, in Pacofs Theatre, Bloemfontein.

== Members ==
The Soil currently consists of three members: Ntsika "Fana-tastic" Ngxanga, Luphindo "Master P" Ngxanga and Theo "Songstress" Matshoba. Theo joined the group in February 2016 as an occasional replacement for Buhlebendalo Mda. Ntsika and Luphindo are biological brothers. During interviews, The Soil usually refers to God as the first member of the group.

== Musical style and influence ==
The Soil musical style has mainly been described as Jazz, Hip hop, Afro-pop, and Afro-soul.

The band cited Miriam Makeba, Busi Mhlongo, Brenda Fassie, and Simphiwe Dana as their music influence.

== Discography ==
=== Studio albums ===
- The Soil (2011)
- Nostalgic Moments (2014)
- Echoes of Kofifi (2016)
- Reimagined (2024)

== Singles ==
=== As lead artist ===
List of singles as lead artist, with selected chart positions and certifications, showing year released and album name
Title	Year	Peak chart positions	Certifications	Album
Title	Year	ZA	Certifications	Album
"Joy"	2011			The Soil - Super Deluxe Edition
"Baninzi (Beatbox Edit)"	2012	—		The Soil (Deluxe Edition)
"Joy (We Are Family) (Da Capo's Surreal Experience)"	2013	—		Non-album single
"Korobela"	2018	—		Non-album single
"Thandwa Ndim" (featuring Thee Legacy)	2023	—		Reimagined
"—" denotes a recording that did not chart or was not released in that territory.

== Awards and nominations ==
=== Metro FM Awards ===
Year	Nominee / work	Award	Result	Ref.
2015	Nostalgic Moments	Best Produced Album	Won	
2015	Nostalgic Moments	Best Duo/Group	Won	

=== South African Music Awards ===
Year	Nominee / work	Award	Result	Ref.
2014	Reflections Live In Joburg	Best RnB, Soul and Reggae	Won	
2024	Reimagined	Best Engineered Album	Won	
2024	Reimagined	Ikwekwezi FM Best African Adult Contemporary Album	Nominated	
