= Simmy =

South African singer-songwriter

- Born: Simphiwe Majobe Nhlangulela; Tugela, KwaZulu-Natal, South Africa
- Genres: Afro-house; neo-soul; neo-folk
- Occupations: Singer; songwriter
- Instrument: Vocals
- Years active: 2017–present
- Label: EL World Music

Simphiwe Majobe Nhlangulela, better known by her stage name Simmy, is a South African singer-songwriter.

She gained prominence in 2018, after she signed a record deal with EL World Music and released her debut studio album Tugela Fairy (2018), spawned with hit singles "Ngiyesaba", "Ubala", "Umahlalela". The album was certified Platinum by the Recording Industry of South Africa (RiSA). She released her second studio album Tugela Fairy (Made of Stars) in 2020.

== Life and career ==
=== Early life and education ===
Simphiwe Majobe Nhlangulela was born in South Africa, as the youngest of four children. In an interview with Emmanuel Tjiya Sowetan newspaper, Simmy revealed that she was raised by strict parents growing up. She is an alumna of University of KwaZulu-Natal, where she studied Social Sciences.

In 2013, while she was attending at University of KwaZulu-Natal, Nhlangulela met Sandile Sithole who introduced her to Sun-El Musician. After she completed her degree in Social Science, Simmy relocated to Johannesburg in 2015 to pursue her musical career.

=== Music career ===
I discovered my voice back in primary school, but didn't take it seriously because I didn't think people would be in love with Simmy's voice. But as time went on, I realised I could do it professionally.

— Mpiletso Motumi, Independent Online

Simmy started her career by auditioning for Idols South Africa and SA's Got Talent but was unsuccessful.

=== 2017–2019: Tugela Fairy ===
Her professional music career started in 2017 by signing to EL World Music after completing her studies which was followed by the release of her debut studio album Tugela Fairy, which was featured in Apple Music artist Spotlight. In February 22, her single "Ubala" was released featuring Sun-El Musician. The song was certified gold. The album was released on October 26, 2018, and was certified gold by the Recording industry of South Africa (RiSA) for South Africa 25 000 sales. Her single "Umahlalela" was certified platinum plaque. At the 25th South African Music Awards, Tugela Fairy was nominated for Best Afro Pop Album.

At the 2019 South African Dance Music Awards, she won Best Female Vocalist award.

=== 2020–present: Tugela Fairy (Made of Stars) ===
Simmy announced work on her second studio album prior to the release of Tugela Fairy, with progress on the record continuing throughout 2020. In March 2020, she released a single "Ngihamba Nawe" fused with the classic Afro-House/neo-soul featuring vocals from Sino Msolo. In October 2020, Simmy headlined to Rose Fest.

On November 9, 2020, her second studio album Tugela Fairy (Made of Stars) was released, which debuted number 3 on Apple Music Charts. The album features Mthunzi, S-Tone, Da Capo, Sun-El Musician, Sino Msolo, Ami Faku, and Khuzani. Tugela Fairy (Made of Stars) received nomination for Best Afro Pop album at the 27th South African Music Awards.

To promote her album Simmy launched Tugela Fairy (Made of Stars) Special Virtual Concert.

She was featured on Shay'na nge White Star campaign, which includes two dates, in May 2022. The first show was held at Johannesburg on 12 May, and last one in Durban on 21 May.

In December 2023, Simmy announced the working on her upcoming third studio album.

== Artistry ==
Growing up in Tugela, she mainly listened to Mbaqanga, country music and Maskandi. Simmy music is generally Afro-house and Neo-Soul but she also incorporates Maskandi and RnB to her other songs. She has cited a number of artists as her inspiration Dolly Parton, Soul Brothers, Letta Mbuli, and Brenda Fassie.

== Personal life ==
Simmy is known to keeping her personal life private.

== Discography ==
=== Studio albums ===
- Tugela Fairy (2018)
- Tugela Fairy (Made of Stars) (2020)

=== Extended plays ===
- Ithuba (2024)

=== Singles ===
==== As lead artist ====
List of singles as lead artist, with selected certifications, showing year released and album name
Title	Year	Certifications	Album
"Umahlalela"	2018	Platinum	Tugela Fairy
"Nawe"	2018		Tugela Fairy
"Ubala" (featuring Sun-El Musician)	2018		Tugela Fairy
"Ngiyesaba"	2018		Tugela Fairy
"Ngihamba nawe" (featuring Sino Msolo)	2020		Tugela Fairy (Made of Stars)
"Emakhaya" (featuring Sun-El Musician and Da Capo)	2020	Platinum	Tugela Fairy (Made of Stars)
"Hlelo" (featuring Msaki)	2022		Non-album singles
"How Deep Is Your Love" (Ralf Gum, Simmy)	2022		Non-album singles
"Better Together" (Jeremy Loops, Simmy)	2022		Non-album singles
"Show Me Love" (Fancy Fingers, Simmy)	2023		Non-album singles
"Ezizweni" (Drega, Simmy)	2024		Non-album singles
"Amazwe" (Simmy, Nkosazana Daughter)	2024		Non-album singles
"Emini" (Mpho.Wav, Simmy)	2024		Book of Wav
"Ithuba" (Thakzin, Hyenah, Simmy)	2024		Ithuba
"Moya Wami"	2024		Non-album single
"Ba Wrong" (Inkos' yamagcokama, Simmy)	2025		Non-album single
"Thabatha" (DJ Ngwazi, Zeh McGeba, Simmy featuring Tee Jay)	2025		Non-album single
"Ngiyabonga" (Yumbs, Simmy, Kailey, Botman featuring Earl Brezzy, Teddy Moloi)	2026		Non-album single
"Bambelela Kuwe" (Frigid Armadillo, Simmy)	2026		The Light

==== As featured artist ====
List of singles as lead artist, showing year released and album name
Title	Year	Album
"Ziyon" (Kenza and Claudio featuring Simmy)	2020	Circles of Life
"Mamezala" (Mafikizolo featuring Sun-El Musician, Simmy and Kenza)	2021	Idwala
"Higher" (Sun-El Musician featuring Simmy)	2021	African Electronic Dance Music
"Before" (Mdoovar featuring Simmy)	2023	Isithembiso
"Ekhaya" (Dlala Thukzin, Simmy, Sino Msolo)	2025	031 Studio Camp 2.0

== Awards and nominations ==
Year	Award ceremony	Prize	Result	Ref.
2019	25th SAMA	Newcomer of the Year	Nominated	
2019	25th SAMA	Best Afro Pop Album	Nominated	
2019	25th SAMA	Record of the Year (Sun-El Musician featuring Simmy and Lelo Kamau – "Sonini")	Won	
	South African Dance Music Awards	Best Female Vocalist	Won	
2020	KZN Entertainment Awards	Best Female Artist	Nominated	
2021	27th SAMA	Best Afro Pop Album	Nominated	
2021	27th SAMA	Record of the Year	Nominated	
2022	Basadi in Music Awards	Artist of the Year	Nominated	
2022	Basadi in Music Awards	Sofn'Free Dance Artist of the Year	Nominated	
2022	AFRIMA	Best Female Artiste in Southern Africa ("We Were Here")	Nominated	
2023	Metro FM Awards	Female Artist of the Year	Nominated	
2023	Basadi in Music Awards	Dance Artist of the Year ("Hlelo" featuring Msaki)	Nominated	
