= Mlindo the Vocalist =

South African Singer and Songwriter

- Born: Lindokuhle Mgedezi; 7 October 1995 (age 31); Port Shepstone, KwaZulu-Natal, South Africa
- Genres: Afropop; R&B
- Occupations: Singer; songwriter
- Instrument: Vocals
- Years active: 2017–present
- Labels: Sony; Blaqboy Music

Lindokuhle Mgedezi (born 7 October 1995), known professionally as Mlindo the Vocalist, is a South African singer and songwriter. He initially gained notable recognition following his debut single, "Amablesser", taken from his debut album, Emakhaya (2018).

== Life and career ==
=== 1995–2016: Early life and beginnings ===
Lindokuhle Magedeza was born in the year 1995 in Port Shepstone, KwaZulu-Natal. At the age of four, he became part of a local church where he discovered his vocal skills. Mlindo attended the Phathwa High School in Gcilima, a borough of Margate.

As he considered starting a musical career, Mlindo later went to Eastern Cape where he joined a hip hop group Flow Riders in 2010. He mainly took part in vocals. In 2014, he established an a cappella group White Bread, after his departure on Flow Riders. White Bread was a success as they won several accolades, including Search for the Stars, held in uShaka Marine World, Durban. In 2017, he won a talent competition Golden Search in Richards Bay, which gave him an opportunity to work with record label Afrotainment, owned by producer DJ Tira. At this year, Mlindo the vocalist was a social media sensation as he uploaded videos covering popular songs. The notable video of him covering a stripped-down version of DJ Maphorisa song "Midnight Starring" went viral. After being discovered by DJ Maphorisa on Twitter, he signed him to his label BlaqBoy Music, then later signed with Universal Music Africa.

=== 2018–2019: Emakhaya ===
On 6 February 2018, Mlindo was featured on Sun-El Musician's song "Bamthathile", becoming a successful hit in various South African radio stations, reaching atop on local charts. He then released his debut single "AmaBlesser" which featured and was produced by DJ Maphorisa. The song eventually became a hit and was certified four times platinum by RiSA on 10 May 2019. As he rose to prominence, Mlindo helped his family by concluding disadvantages they faced. He managed to hire a house for his brother, and helped his unemployed mother.

After the success of his single "AmaBlesser", Mlindo revealed his debut album cover and its release date as it was made available for pre-order on iTunes. His debut album Emakhaya was released on 21 September 2018. The album was certified platinum by RiSA and managed to get almost 45 million streams countrywide as of May 2019. The second single "Macala" managed to reach number-one in South Africa, following the success of his lead single. The album earned Mlindo three nominations at the 25th edition of the South African Music Awards; Best Newcomer of the Year, Best Produced Album and Best Afro Pop Album.

=== 2020-present: Umthandazo, Lindokuhle ===
Mlindo was reportedly working on his second studio album by August 2020. In 2020, he released two singles titled "Yekela" featuring Masiano & Vusi Nova followed by "Mali" single featuring Nathi.

In late June 2022, he made announcement on his Instagram account off his second studio album.

Lindokuhle was released on 22 July 2022.

== Discography ==
Studio albums

- Emakhaya (2018)
- Lindokuhle (2022)

== Awards and nominations ==
=== KZN Entertainment Awards ===
Year	Nominee / work	Award	Result
2020	Himself	Best Male Artist	Nominated

=== Metro FM Music Awards ===
Year	Nominee / work	Award	Result
2023	Lindokuhle	Best Afro Soul Pop	Nominated
