= Tresor (musician) =

Congolese-born singer, songwriter

- Born: Mukengerwa Tresor Riziki; 24 April 1987 (age 39); Goma, DR Congo
- Origin: Democratic Republic of the Congo
- Genres: Afro pop, Afrobeats, pop, dance
- Occupations: Singer; songwriter; music producer; entrepreneur; philanthropist
- Instruments: Vocals; guitar; percussion; drums
- Years active: 2008–present
- Labels: Sony Music (former); Universal Music (former); label VII Recordings
- Website: www.tresorofficial.com

Mukengerwa Tresor Riziki (born 24 April 1987), best known by his stage name Tresor (stylised as TRESOR), is a Congolese-born singer, songwriter, music producer, entrepreneur and philanthropist. He gained prominence in 2015 after releasing his single "Mount Everest" from his debut album, VII. His name "Tresor", when translated from French, means "treasure".

== Early life and career ==
TRESOR was born on the 24th of April 1987 in Goma, Democratic Republic of the Congo. He is one of eight siblings. Orphaned at the age of seventeen, he left his home in 2007 after completing high school. He listened to music from musicians such as Hugh Masekela, Papa Wemba and Miriam Makeba. His love for music grew and when he was frequently taken to child care centers he began playing instruments. Later on, both of his parents died due to illness and he decided to pursue his musical dream. After months of travelling, he settled in Durban, South Africa, where he worked as a car guard by day and a security guard by night to make ends meet. In that time, he began working his way into Durban's local scene, performing as a session musician with various musicians.

In June 2015, he got signed to Sony Music. As part of his major label debut, he released the single "Never Let Me Go", which was co-written and co-produced by Matthew Field from Beatenberg. The song was certified 5× platinum by the Recording industry of South Africa (RiSA). He released his debut album, VII in September 2015. The album had taken him seven years to compose, it featured collaborations from musicians such as AKA, Beatenberg, Khuli Chana and The Soil. The album achieved mainstream success and charted #1 dance hit record in Italy for the singles "Mount Everest" and "Never Let Me Go". The single "Mount Everest" (Freddy Verano Remix) reached #1 on the Shazam trending Global Chart in 2016. The singles were released by Sony Music and Ultra Music in the US and Warner Music in some parts of Europe. The album won Best pop album at the 22nd South African Music Awards and was also one of the most nominated albums. He was also nominated at the 2016 MTV Africa Music Awards for Best pop/alternative artist.

In 2016, he was invited by British musician Seal to join his South African tour the week after his SAMA win. They toured together in Johannesburg, Durban and Cape Town. In April 2017, he signed a partnership with Universal Music under his company Jacquel Entertainment Group. He then released his sophomore album The Beautiful Madness in May 2017. The album won Best afro pop album at the 24th South African Music Awards four months after its release.

In 2019, he released his third album Nostalgia. The album won Best Afro Pop Album at the 25th South African Music Awards in 2019. It featured musicians such as AKA, Kwesta, Lokua Kanza, Beatenberg, Mafikizolo, The Soil, Sauti Sol and Msaki. Later that year, he released the single "Sondela" featuring singer Msaki, the single was nominated for record of the year at the 26th South African Music Awards. In June 2020, he announced the release of his fourth album Motion. The album features singles such as "Thril" and "Zwakala" which were already released at the time. The single "Zwakala" was sampled from Ray Phiri’s "Stimela".

In April 2021, he released his album Rumble In The Jungle, which featured South African amapiano producers Kabza De Small and DJ Maphorisa. On September 3, 2021, he released the single "Light House" in collaboration with Da Capo and Sun-El Musician. The song entered Channel O Top 30 at number 15. Tresor contributed a cover of the Metallica song "Nothing Else Matters" to the charity tribute album The Metallica Blacklist, released in September 2021. "Lighthouse" is the lead single off his highly anticipated fourth solo studio album, Motion, which was released on 15 October 2021. The album was nominated for best Afro pop album at the 28th South African Music Awards.

He also wrote and produced the single "Fountains" which featured Nigerian singer Tems for Drake's 2021 album Certified Lover Boy.

In April 2022, it was announced that Hunters partnered with TRESOR to establish the Jacquel Culture House platform for upcoming artists.

In June 2022, he wrote and co-produced the singles "Currents", "Massive", "Flight's Booked", "Overdrive", "Downhill" and "Tie That Binds" for Drake's 2022 album Honestly, Nevermind.

The following month, Tresor was enlisted on the Billboard Hot 100 Songwriters list at number 15.

In January 2023, he co-wrote and produced the single "We Caa Done", which features Drake and Popcaan.

=== Activism ===
Outside of his work as a musician, he is an ambassador of the Nelson Mandela Children Fund and also a United Refugee Agency ambassador advocating for refugees rights.

== Business ventures ==
=== Jacquel Entertainment Group ===
TRESOR started his own record label and talent management company in 2010. He sought for an avenue to release his own music, as well helping in the nurturing of other artists. The label is currently distributed by Universal Music and houses artists such as Bonj and Batundi.

=== Jacquel Culture House ===
In April 2022, he launched Jacquel Culture House, a division of Jacquel Entertainment Group, which is a youth incubation and empowerment programme for upcoming South African artists.

=== Jacquel Ventures Investment Firm ===
In November 2023, he launched his R100 million Jacquel Ventures Investment Firm. The firm is aimed at building and investing in luxury goods, real estate, consumer brands, entertainment, and technology-enabled companies. With the aim to be at the forefront of shaping the future of businesses that impact lives and shift culture in Africa and beyond.

=== Goma ===
In February 2024, TRESOR started with the plan to build his multi-million rand, luxury farm nicknamed "Goma". The property is set to consist of restaurants, an outdoor amphitheatre, a recording studio, an art and exhibition gallery, a designer boutique hotel and few venues for special events. The project marks his first investment under Jacquel Ventures and is set to be a 3-year long project where R30 million will be invested.

== Discography ==
=== Studio albums ===
- VII (2015)
- VII (Repack) (2016)
- The Beautiful Madness (2017)
- Nostalgia (2019)
- Rumble In The Jungle (2021)
- Motion (2021)

== Production discography ==
=== 2021 ===
Drake – Certified Lover Boy

- 16. "Fountains" (featuring Tems)

=== 2022 ===
Drake – Honestly, Nevermind

- 4. "Currents"
- 8. "Massive"
- 9. "Flights Booked"
- 10. "Overdrive"
- 11. "Down Hill"
- 12. "Tie That Binds"

=== 2023 ===
Popcaan – Great Is He

- 1. "We Caa Done"

== Awards and nominations ==
Year	Award ceremony	Prize	Result
2016	South African Music Awards	Album of the Year	Nominated
2016	South African Music Awards	Newcomer of the Year	Nominated
2016	South African Music Awards	Best Pop Album	Won
2016	MTV Africa Music Awards	Best Pop & Alternative	Nominated
2018	South African Music Awards	Album of the Year	
2018	South African Music Awards	Male Artist of the year	Won
2018	South African Music Awards	Best Pop Album	Won
2019	South African Music Awards	Best Pop Album	Won
2020	South African Music Awards	Record of the Year	Nominated
2020	South African Music Awards	Best Produced Music Video	Nominated
2022	Global Music Awards Africa	Male Vocalist of the Year	Pending
2022	South African Music Awards	Best Pop Album	Nominated
