= Sun-El Musician =

South African music producer and DJ

- Born: Sanele Tresure Sithole; 28 March 1989 (age 37); Mooi River, KwaZulu-Natal, South Africa
- Education: University of KwaZulu-Natal (dropped out)
- Musical career
- Occupations: DJ; songwriter; music producer
- Instruments: piano; vocals; keyboard
- Years active: 2011–present
- Labels: Under Da Sun; EL World Music; Demor (former)

Sanele Tresure Sithole (born 28 March 1989), known professionally as Sun-El Musician, is a South African disc jockey, music producer, and songwriter. Born and raised in Mooi River, he attended the University of KwaZulu-Natal but dropped out to pursue a career in music. His debut studio album Africa to the World (2018), was certified Platinum by the Recording Industry of South Africa (RiSA).

Sun-El's second album, To the World & Beyond (2020), was met with further commercial success, certified Platinum by Recording Industry of South Africa (RiSA).

He was a producer for Demor Music before the establishment of his own record label, EL World Music. His most recent album African Electronic Dance Music was released in October 2021.

== Life and career ==
=== Early life and education ===
Sanele Tresure Sithole was born on 28 March 1989 in the town of Mooi River, KwaZulu-Natal, South Africa, and raised along with his four siblings by a domestic worker mother. He attended the University of KwaZulu-Natal but dropped out in 2007.

=== Career ===
Shortly after he left school Sithole spent two years at home and began his musical career in 2007 remixing songs and creating mixtapes. Sithole met Thandukwazi Demor Sikhosana who signed him under his record label Demor Music (Pty) Ltd, worked as music producer for a period of 5 years. During that period he worked in the studio with Bucie from 2011-2014, and he produced three albums for Demor.

=== 2015-2019: EL World Music, Africa to the World ===
In early 2017 he established EL World Music.

Sithole then began to create his own music under the name Sun-El Musician. His debut single "Akanamali" featuring Samthing Soweto was released on May 21, 2017. It became his first biggest song reached no.1 on Shazam and certified Platinum in South Africa.

"Bamthathile" featuring Mlindo the Vocalist was released on February 23, 2018, as album's second single.

His debut studio album Africa to the World, was released on April 20, 2018. The album reached Platinum in South Africa.

The singles "Sonini", "Bamthathile", and "Ntab'Ezikude" all received 2× Platinum certifications from the Recording Industry of South Africa (RiSA) In June 2018, his single "Akanamali" earned him three awards at the 24th South African Music Awards, including Best Collaboration, Highest Airplay Song and Highest Airplay Composer. Africa to the World was also nominated at the 25th South African Music Awards in June 2019.

Sithole made collaboration with Ami Faku on a single "Into Ingawe", released on June 7, 2019. The song was certified 3× Platinum by RiSA.

Also in 2019, Sithole embarked on an extensive tour of South Africa.

=== 2020-2021: To the World & Beyond, African Electronic Dance Music ===
In April 2020, Sithole released album's lead single "Uhuru" with South African singer Azana.

Following month May 2020, his second single "Ubomi Abumanga" featuring Msaki was released. It was certified 2× Platinum by Recording Industry of South Africa.

"Emoyeni", a single by Sun-El Musician, Khuzani, Simmy was released in July 2020, in celebration of Ukhozi FM 60th Anniversary.

His second studio album To the World & Beyond was released in December 4, 2020. The album reached Platinum in South Africa.

African Electronic Dance Music was released on 29 October 2021 in South Africa. On African Electronic Dance Music, Sun-El experimented electronic dance music style incorporated with elements of afro house. It was supported by four singles; "Higher", "Amateki/Ululate", "Woza". Pan-African Music enlisted African Electronic Dance Music number 1 on The 30 best albums of 2021 year-end lists.

African Electronic Dance Music received three nominations; Album of the Year, Male Artist of the Year, and Best Dance Album at the 28th South African Music Awards.

The previous day, Sithole headlined the Basha Uhuru Creative Uprising Festival alongside Langa Mavuso.

In December 2021, Sithole was chosen by Gallo Records to work on classic songs remix on the Extended Play titled Music is Forever along with Nobuhle, Muzi, and other artists.

=== 2022-2023: AEDM: Interstellar ===
In May 21, he headlined to Bassline I AM LIVE concert.

Towards the end of May 2022, he headlined to MTN Bushfire Festival, held at Malkerns Valley, from May 27–29.

Sithole announced his upcoming project AEDM: Interstellar (pronounced African Electronic Dance Music: Interstellar) on December 8, 2022 set to be released on 2023 released double single "Makwande" with Fk Mash, Ami Faku, "Rata" with TNS and Skillz. Both singles were released on December 9, 2022.

In April 2023, Sun-El Musician and Msaki teased a single "Amandla" on a snippet video clip and announced release date on October. The song was released on November 3, 2023.

=== 2024-present: New label Under Da Sun, Under The Sun, Red Bull Symphonic (Afro House, Our Home) ===
His fourth studio album Under The Sun, was released on February 13, 2026. The production of the album incorporated elements of soulful house, Afro-electronic production and organic instrumentation.

Towards the end of April 2026, Sun-EL Musician & Dlala Thukzin sold out their Red Bull Symphonic (Afro House, Our Home) 2026 in 2 hours, was conducted by Chad Hendricks The two night event was scheduled for June 13-14 at Montecasino, Johannesburg.

== Discography ==
=== Albums ===
List of albums, with selected details, sales figures and certifications
Title	Album details	Certifications
Africa to the World	Released: 20 April 2018; Label: EL World Music; Formats: CD, digital download, streaming	RISA: Platinum
To the World & Beyond	Released: 4 December 2020; Label: EL World Music; Formats: CD, digital download, streaming	RISA: Platinum
African Electronic Dance Music	Released: 29 October 2021; Label: EL World Music; Formats: CD, digital download, streaming	
Under The Sun	Released: 13 February 2026; Label: Under Da Sun; Formats: Digital download, streaming	

=== EPs ===
List of EPs, with selected details
Title	EP details
AEDM: Interstellar	Released: 9 December 2022; Label: EL World Music; Formats: Streaming, digital download
Impatient/You Never Know	Released: 11 August 2026; Label: Anjunadeep; Formats: Streaming, digital download

== Singles ==
=== As lead artist ===
List of singles as lead artist, with selected chart positions and certifications, showing year released and album name
Title	Year	Peak chart positions	Certifications	Album
"Akanamali" (featuring Samthing Soweto)	2017	1	RiSA: Platinum	Africa to the World
"Ntab'Ezikude" (featuring Simmy)	2018		RiSA: 2× platinum	Africa to the World
"Bamthathile" (featuring Mlindo the Vocalist)	2018		RiSA: 2× Platinum	Africa to the World
"Sonini" (featuring Simmy and Lelo Kamau)	2018		RiSA:2× Platinum	Africa to the World
"Bomi Abumanga" (featuring Msaki)	2020		RiSA: 2× Platinum	To the World & Beyond
"Garden" (featuring Julia Church)	2020	—		To the World & Beyond
"Uhuru" (featuring Azana)	2020			To the World & Beyond
"Never Never" (featuring Nobuhle)	2020		RiSA: Gold	To the World & Beyond
"Into Ingawe" (featuring Ami Faku)	2020		RiSA: 3× platinum	Non-album single
"Higher" (featuring Simmy)	2021	6		African Electronic Dance Music
"Amateki" (featuring Bholoja)	2021			African Electronic Dance Music
"Woza" (featuring Linos Rosetta)	2021			African Electronic Dance Music
"Respond" (Miči, Sun-EL Musician)	2022	—		Non-album single
"Amandla" (Sun-El Musician, Msaki)	2023	—		Non-album single
"Hamba Nami" (Sun-El Musician, Fearless Musiq, Section Five)	2024	—		Non-album single
"Inhliziyo" (Sun-EL Musician, Mthandazo Gatya, Anzo featuring Kenza)	2024	—		Non-album single
"feelings" (Miči, Frigid Armadillo, Sun-El Musician)	2024	—		Non-album single
"Dangerous" (Sun-El Musician, Jnr SA)	2024	—		Non-album single
"Sunshine" (Frigid Armadillo, Sun-El Musician)	2025	—		Non-album single
"You're Light" (Sun-El Musician, Msaki, Karyendasoul)	2025	—		Non-album single
"Koyika" (Sun-EL Musician featuring Sai Hle)	2025	—		Under The Sun
"The Rise" (Sun-EL Musician featuring Mpho.Wav, Nurogroove)	2025	—		Under The Sun
"Angeke" (Sun-EL Musician, Thatohatsi, JNR SA, Kenza)	2026	—		Under The Sun
"Ipatshazi" (JNR SA, Sun-EL Musician featuring Section Five)	2026	—		Dance to My Afro
"Bring Me More Bass" (Chronical Deep, Sun-El Musician)	2026	—		H.O.P.E
"—" denotes a recording that did not chart or was not released in that territory.

=== Production and songwriting credits ===
List of production and songwriting credits, showing original artists, year released and album name
Title	Year	Artist(s)	Album	Credit(s)	Written with:	Produced with:
"Ngiyesaba"	2018	Simmy	Tugela Fairy	Producer	Simmy	
"Wawundithembisile"	2021	The One Who Sings	Non-album single	Producer	Zolani Mahola	Kenza (SA)
"Light House"	2021	TRESOR	Motion	Co-producer		TRESOR; Da Capo
"Ezangakini"	2022	Professor featuring Shwi, and Sun-El Musician	Non-album single	Producer	Mkhonzeni Langa, Mandla Xaba, Zwelenduna Magubane, and Khethonjani Dludla	Mpho.Wav and Tebogo Mbolekwa
"Indlela"	2023	Drega, Sun-El Musician and Maline Aura	Non-album single	Producer	Bonga Ntozini, Sanele Sithole and Thandolwethu Nkomo	Drega

=== Guest appearances ===
Title	Year	Other artist(s)	Album
"Ndivulele"	2019	Ami Faku	Imali
"Hosana"	2020	Black Motion	The Healers: The Last Chapter
"Yasha Imizi"	2020	Claudio x Kenza	Circle of Life
"Shine"	2020	S-Tone	Mbabane
"Control"	2021	Karyendasoul	Imizamo
"Jungle"	2021	Kenza	Fly Away
"You need Me"	2021	Black Coffee	Subconsciously
"Ngaphesheya"	2021	Mobi Dixon, Nombila, Massive Ricco	When House Was House
"Idwala"	2022	Mafikizolo	Idwala
"Africa Hey"	2022	Ndlovu Youth Choir	Greatful
"Esikhathini"	2022	Murumba Pitch	Horumar
"Umthwalo"	2022	Vitoto	Afro Nation
"Am Going"	2022	DJ Bongz, Zaba, Sykes	Road Trip
"Love & Pride"	2025	Thakzin, Miči	Gods window, Pt. 1
"Ngiyakhala"	2025	Nomfundo Moh, Simmy, LeeKeyz, NDLOH JNR	Out The Box
"Dida Bani"	2026	Frigid Armadillo, Nkosazana Daughter, Soa Mattrix, Mr Abie	The Light

== Other charted and certified songs ==
List of other charted songs, with selected chart positions and certifications, showing year released and album name
Title	Year	Peak chart positions	Certifications	Album
Title	Year	ZA	Certifications	Album
"Best Friend" (Sun-EL Musician, Msaki)	2021	75	Gold	African Electronic Dance Music
"—" denotes a recording that did not chart or was not released in that territory.

== Tours ==
- EL World Music Experience (2019)

== Awards and nominations ==
Year	Award Ceremony	Prize	Result	Ref.
2018	24th South African Music Awards	Collaboration	Won	
2018	24th South African Music Awards	Highest Airplay Song	Won	
2018	24th South African Music Awards	Highest Airplay Composer	Won	
2019	25th South African Music Awards	Record of the Year (Sun-El Musician featuring Simmy and Lelo Kamau – Sonini)	Won	
2019	25th South African Music Awards	Newcomer of the Year	Nominated	
2019	25th South African Music Awards	Best Dance Album	Nominated	
2020	KZN Entertainment Awards	Best Club DJ Male	Nominated	
2020	KZN Entertainment Awards	Best Producer	Nominated	
2021	SAMAs 27	Best Dance Album	Nominated	
2021	SAMAs 27	Male Artist of the Year	Nominated	
2021	SAMAs 27	Best Produced Album of the Year	Nominated	
2021	SAMAs 27	Remix of the Year	Nominated	
2021	SAMAs 27	Best Live Audio of the Year	Won	
2021	M K H M A	Best DJ	Nominated	
2021	All Africa Music Awards	Best Male Artist in Southern Africa	Nominated	
2022	SAMA 28	Album of the Year	Nominated	
2022	SAMA 28	Best Dance Album	Nominated	
2022	SAMA 28	Male Artist of the Year	Nominated	
2022	SAMA 28	Remix of the Year	Won	
