= 28th Annual South African Music Awards =

2022 award ceremony

28th South Africa Music Awards (SAMA 28)
- Date: August 28, 2022
- Venue: Sun City
- Country: South Africa
- Hosted by: Lawrence Maleka; Nandi Madida
- Preshow hosts: Robot Boii; Mpho Popps

Highlights
- Most wins: Chymamusique (3)
- Most nominations: Zakes Bantwini (7)

Television/radio coverage
- Network: SABC 1

The 28th Annual South African Music Awards was the 28th ceremony of the South African Music Awards. The ceremony was broadcast on SABC 1 hosted by Lawrence Maleka and Nandi Madida on August 28, 2022.

Nominees were announced on June 7, 2022. Zakes Bantwini lead the nominations with seven each, ahead of Msaki with 5 nominations.

== Background ==
The 28th South African Music Awards partnered with TikTok for the first time to promote the ceremony.

Three categories; Record of the Year, Music Video of the Year, SAMPRA Artist of the Year, were announced on June 3, 2022.

Full list nominees were announced on June 7, 2022.

Nominees of the last category sponsored by TikTok was announced on August 14, 2022.

The first ceremony was held at City Superbowl, Rustenburg on 27 August was broadcast live on YouTube and TikTok, hosted by Mpho Popps and Robot Boii.

== Winners and nominees ==
Winners are listed first in bold.

| Album of the Year | Best Engineered Album of the Year |
|---|---|
| **Chymamusique - Musique**; Sun-El Musician - African Electronic Dance Music; Zakes Bantwini - Ghetto King; Brian Temba - It's All You; Mobi Dixon - When House Was House | **Peter Auret: Charl Du Plessis Trio – It Takes Three**; Greg Abrahams, Mike Zietsman & Vincente: Moonga K- Candid; Zakes Bantwini – Ghetto King; Sibabalwa Andile Fiphaza: 25K – Pheli Makaveli; Daniel Baron & Darryn Muller: Daniel Baron - City of God & The Jungle Bow |
| Female Artist of the Year | Male Artist of the Year |
| **Msaki – Platinumb Heart Open**; Khanyisile Mthethwa – African Bird; Kamo Mphela – Nkulunkulu; Reign Afrika – Trailblazer; Shekhinah – Trouble in Paradise | **Chymamusique – Musique**; Sun-El Musician – African Electronic Dance Music; Zakes Bantwini – Ghetto King; Brian Temba – It's all You; Mobi Dixon – When House Was House |
| Newcomer of the Year | Duo/Group of the Year |
| **Khanyisile Mthethwa – African Bird** | **Reece Madlisa & Zuma – Ama Roto Vol. 2**; Watershed – Elephant in the Room; Franco Princeloo & Vox choir – Franco Princeloo: Kruis Van Liefde; Wouter Kellerman & David Arkenstone – Pangea; Shwi Nomtekhala – Wangikhulisa Umama |
| Best Dance Album | Best Amapiano Album |
| **Chymamusique - Musique**; Miza - Muzika; Zakes Bantwini - Ghetto King; Mobi Dixon - When House Was House; Sun-El Musician - African Electronic Dance Music | **Young Stunna - Notumato**; Kamo Mphela - Nkulunkulu; Mas Musiq - Auti 'eSharp; Mellow & Sleazy - Kwa Kwa; Focalistic - President Ya Strata |
| Best Afro Pop Album | Best Hip Hop Album |
| **Nomfundo Moh - Amagama**; Mnqobi Yazo - iStiff; Bonga Kwana - New Faces To old Problems; CiCi - Sukulila; Aubrey Qwana - Amalobolo | **Blxckie - B4Now**; Kid X - Father of Zen; 25k - Pheli Makaveli; A-Reece - Today's Tragedy, Tomorrow's Memory: The Mixtape; Emtee - Logan |
| Best Kwaito Album | Best Collaboration |
| **Reece Madlisa & Zuma - Ama Roto Vol. 2**; Sukiri Papa - Don't Lose Focus; Simply Eugene - Let Dogs Lie Low; Shisa Boy - Kwaito Pallet; King Razo - Trip to Jozi | **Zakes Bantwini & Kasango - "Osama"**; Karyendasoul & Zakes Bantwini featuring Nana Atta - "iMali"; Njeli & Boohle featuring De Mthuda, Da Muziqal Chef - "Wamuhle"; Makhadzi featuring Joe Delinger - "Zwivhuya"; Msaki featuring Da Capo - "No Rainbow" |
| Best Rock Album | Best Pop Album |
| **Springbok Nude Girls - Partypocalypse**; Steve Louw - Headlights Dream; Tim Parr - Revolution; Deity's Muse - Ennui; Albert Frost - Sacred Sound | **Shekinah - Trouble in Paradise**; Jeremy Loops - Souvenirs; TRESOR - Motion; Bonj - A Journal; Jacky Carpede - Don't Let Go |
| Best Gqom Album | Best Reggae Album |
| **Dladla Mshunqisi - Umshunqo Reloaded**; Bello No Gallo - Khula; Dlala Thukzin - Summer Banger; T-Man - Best of the Best; Slenda Da Dancing DJ - The Journey | **Reign Afrika – Trailblazer**; Skeleton Blazer - He Crowned I Emperor; Ras Canley - Hard to Believe; Botanist Mr Lamington - The Shift; Red Is Scorch – Ngatanngwe |
| Best Classical/Instrumental Album | Best Jazz Album |
| **Khanyisile Mthethwa - African Bird**; Wouter Kellerman & Davi Arkenstone - Pangaea; Charl Du Plessis Trio - It Takes Three; Scheppel - Afrikaans; Franco Prinsloo - Vox Chamber Choir | **Jimmy Dludlu - History In A Frame**; Herbie Tsoaeli - At This Point In Time Voices In Volumes; Sibusiso Mash Mashiloane - Music From My People; Steve Dyer - Revision; McCoy Mrubata - Quiet Please |
| Beste Kontemporêre Musiek Album | Beste Pop Album |
| **Die Heuwels Fantasties - Volume**; Jan Jan Jan - Al Die Oysters; Neil Sandilands - Sangona Sandilands & Jou Pa Se Posse Maanskyn; Jennifer Zamuido - Twintigeentwintig; Jodi Jantjies - Woorde | **Posduif - Nkis Vergelyk**; Juan Boucher - Hier Waar Ek Nou Is; Janie Bay - Prisma; Elandre - Rugsak; Rita Li - Roekeloos |
| Beste Contemporary Faith Album | Best African Indigenous Faith Music Album |
| **Pulane Maphari - Sacrificial Worship (Live)**; Thabelo - My Heart To Him; KingDMusic - Denga; Lauren Cullen - Find Me Singing; Ncebakazi Msomi - The 34th Psalm | **NUZ Voices Of Joy - Similapha Nkosi**; Isaac & The Mighty Messengers - Ba Bosiu; JTG Gospel Choir - Re Kopa Go Wena Ramasedi; The Harmony Singers Artists Development - Ore Etele Mohloeki; Zion Iskhalanga Academy - Swi Lava Yeso |
| Best Maskandi | Best Traditional Album |
| **Thokozani Langa - Idayimani**; Makhamnandi - Ziyashisa; Shwi no Mtekhala - Wangikhulisa Umama; Udumakahle - Phakati Komhlane; Mzukulu - Ivila Laselawini | **Dr Mercy Masakona Mazivhandila - Tshihwilili**; Mkhanyalude - Dlozified; Vha Venda Cultural Group - Dziya Fhirana; Tau Sebata - Mathotse; Klipwef - Hantam Kersfees |
| Best Traditional Faith Music Album | Remix of the Year |
| **Vela Nkosi - Jumbo**; Puleng March - Heaven's Scroll; Paul K - In The Beginning; Takie Ndou - The Gret Revival; Zaza - Shrubs of Chronicle (Live) | **Da Capo, Sun-El Musician and Azana - "Uhuru" by Sun-El Musician & Azana**; Manyelo Dafro Bassekou Kouyate & Da Capo - "Ladon" – Manyelo featuring Bassekou Kouyate; Lira & DJ Maphorisa - "Feel Good"; Da Capo - "Mama" by Josiah De Disciple & Boohle; DJ Cleo - "Gcina Impilo Yam" by Bucy Radebe |
| Best Produced Music Video | Best Produced Album of the Year |
| **Mabi Ntuli & Shona - Mobi Dixon featuring Mariechan and Jnr SA – "When House Was House"**; Edward (Gobi Beast) & Ofentse Mwase - Big Zulu featuring Mduduzi Ncube – "Inhlupheko"; Ted Magerman - K.O – "Playback"; Dale Fortune - Mafikizolo featuring Simmy – "Mamezala"; Mninzo Sitho & Nhlanhla – AKA - "Finessin" | Bokang & Ndumiso - Malome Vector- Karabo; Neo Muyanga & Asanda - Msaki – Platinum Heart Open; Howard Bradley - Vaughn Prangley – Destination Unknown; The One Who Sings – Thetha Mama; Seak, Keanan Leroy & Arthur -; Jacques Du Plesis High - Khan Morbee – A World At Suicide |
| Best RnB/Soul Album | Best Alternative Music Album |
| **Brian Temba - It's All You**; P.Postman - Real Talk; Melleng - The Arrival; Joda Kgosi - Sour Milk; Mikhale Jones – It Is What It Is | Daniel Baron - City of God & The Jungle Below; Lo-Ghost - Night Speak; Alice Phoebe Lou - Glow; Anna Wolf - Romance Was Born; Alice Phoebe Lou - Child's Play |
| Rest of Africa | Best Adult Contemporary Album |
| **Tems - If Orange was a Place**; Edgar Muzah - Son of a Tribe; Malome Vector - Karabo; CKay - Boyfriend; Tay Iwar - Love and Isolation | **Msaki - Platinumb Heart Open**; Thapelo Lekoena - Tapestry; Pat Mccay - Where the Light Gets In; Watershed - Elephant in the Room; Jacob Swann - Brother |
| Best African Adult Contemporary Album | Record of the Year |
| **Mandisi Dyantyis - Cwaka**; The One Who Sings - Thetha Mama; Ntando - Camagu; Joe Nina - 2020; Nomfusi - The Red Stoep | **"Vula Mlomo" – Musa Keys featuring Sir Trill and Nobantu Vilakazi**; "Osama" – Zakes Bantwini and Kasango; "Questions" – Shekhinah; "Mamela" – Mi Casa; "Banyana" – DJ Maphorisa and Tyler ICU featuring Daliwonga, Sir Trill and Kabza De Small; "Abalele" – Kabza De Small and DJ Maphorisa featuring Ami Faku; "Adiwele" – Young Stunna featuring Kabza De Small; "Bopha" – Mellow & Sleazy and Felo Le Tee featuring DJ Maphorisa, Madumane and Young Stunna; "Asibe Happy" – Kabza De Small and DJ Maphorisa featuring Ami Faku; "John Wick" – De Mthuda featuring Da Muziqal Chef and Sir Trill; "I'm With You" – Matthew Mole; "Umsebenzi Wethu" – Busta 929 and Mpura featuring Zuma, Mr JazziQ, Lady Du and Reece Madlisa; "Black and White" – Nasty C and Ari Lennox; "Izolo" – DJ Maphorisa and Tyler ICU featuring Mpura, Daliwonga and Visca; "Phakade Lami" – Nomfundo Moh feat. Sha Sha and Ami Faku; "Jola" – De Mthuda feat. Sino Msolo; "Shine Your Light" – Master KG and David Guetta featuring Akon; "Postcards" – Jeremy Loops; "Ngathwala Ngaye" – Kelly Khumalo featuring Mondli Ngcobo; "Right Now" – Elaine |
| SAMPRA Artist of the Year | Music Video of the Year |
| **Haksul MUZIQ**; Bello no Gallo; Fanie Dick; AfroToniQ; Zion Agreement; A-Reece; Musa Keys; Msaki; Jennifer Zamudio; Millie Ngwalangwala; Rodger KB; Brandon Dhludhlu; HunTer Leite; NLite; Emtee; PressCee; Cece Vee; Young Stunna; Lady X; Makhadzi | **"Ghanama" – Makhadzi featuring Prince Benza**; "LiYoshona (Main Mix)" – Kwiish SA featuring Njelic, MalumNator and De Mthuda; "Izolo" – DJ Maphorisa and Tyler ICU featuring Mpura, Daliwonga and Visca; "Summer Yo Muthi" – Blaq Diamond; "Phakade Lami" – Nomfundo Moh featuring Sha Sha and Ami Faku; "Nkulunkulu" – Kamo Mphela; "Jola" – De Mthuda featuring Sino Msolo and Da Muziqal Chef; "Indlovu" – DJ Zinhle featuring Lloyiso; "Yini Sdakwa" – ThackzinDJ, Tee Jay and Sir Trill featuring Dlala Thukzin, Nkosazana Daughter, Rascoe Kaos, Moscow and Mpura; "S'bali" – Intaba Yase Dubai; "Mamela" – Mi Casa; "John Wick" – De Mthuda featuring Sir Trill and Da Muziqal Chef; "Woza" – Mr JazziQ, Kabza De Small and Lady Du feat. Boohle; "Superman" – DJ Stokie featuring Kabza De Small, Masterpiece YVK and Madumane; "Getting Late" – Tyla featuring Kooldrink; "Umuzi eSandton" – Big Zulu featuring Lwah Ndlunkulu; "Buyile" – Khuli Chana featuring Tyler ICU, Stino Le Thwenny and Lady Du; "Inhlupheko" – Big Zulu featuring Mduduzi; "Chucks" – YOUNOTUS and Mi Casa; "Mmapula" – Busta 929 featuring Mzu M |
TikTok Viral Song of the Year
**"Umlando" - 9umba, TOSS and Mdoovar featuring Sino Msolo**; "Trigger" - DJ Karri; "Abo Mvelo" - Daliwonga featuring Mellow, Sleazy and MJ; "Sisonke" - Thozi featuring Khanyisa, Sphokuhle N and Pd Jokes; "Nkao Tempela" - Ch'cco, Mellow and Sleazy; "Bakwa Lah" - Major League Djz, Nvcho and Mathandos; "Phakade Lami- Nomfundo Moh; "Banyana" - DJ Maphorisa and Tyler ICU; "Adiwele" - Young Stunna featuring Kabza De Small and DJ Maphorisa; "Big Flexa" - Costa Titch

== Special awards ==
Below the list are the recipients of achievement awards announced on August 2, 2022.

=== International Achievement ===
- Black Coffee for his international debut to the world and his astonishing Grammy win.

=== Lifetime Achievement ===
- McCoy Mrubata
- Joe Nina
- Jimmy Dludlu

=== Chairmans Award ===
- Yvonne Chaka Chaka

=== SAMRO Highest Radio Airplay Composers Award ===
- "Osama" - Zakes Bantwini and Kasango
