= Karyendasoul =

South African DJ and music producer

- Born: Bonga Ntozini; June 12, 1997 (age 28); Nqamakhwe, Eastern Cape, South Africa
- Genres: Afro House
- Occupations: DJ; Music producer
- Years active: 2016–present
- Labels: Universal Music Group

Bonga Ntozini (born 12 June 1997), professionally known as Karyendasoul, is a South African DJ and music producer.

== Life and career ==
Bonga Ntozini was born 12 June 1997 in Nqamakhwe, Eastern Cape. His musical interests began in primary school as a choir member.

In 2015, Karyendasoul appeared on We Live 4OUR Music, an extended play released under Surreal Sounds Music in partnership with Red Bull Studios Cape Town. The following year, Kenny Dope invited Karyendasoul to be included on Dopewax Approved: Kenny Dope & Friends, a compilation for ADE. His extended play Waka was released on 20 October 2018 under Gondwana.

The EP Digital Anolog was released on 16 October 2020.

In 2021, Karyendasoul co-produced "Osama" by Zakes Bantwini and Kasango from Ghetto King.

Karyendasoul's breakthrough single "iMali", featuring Zakes Bantwini and Nana Atta, debuted at number 1 and spent five weeks at number 1 on the South African radio charts. The Imizamo EP was released on 12 November 2021.

"Control", featuring Sun-El Musician and Priscilla, was released in October 2022.

His debut studio album We Live 4 Our Music was released on 7 April 2023. With his production the album was an afro-tech house record. It was supported by three singles, "Umthandazo", "Something More", and "Jacaranda".

In April 2023, Karyendasoul was an Isgubhu Cover Star by Apple Music.

== Discography ==
=== Studio albums ===
- We Live 4 Our Music (2023)

=== Extended plays ===
- Imizamo (2021)
- Oh, Hello (2025)

=== Guest appearances ===
Title	Year	Other artist(s)	Album
"Overdose"	2024	Miči	Feelings

== Singles ==
=== As lead artist ===
List of singles as lead artist, with selected chart positions and certifications, showing year released and album name
Title	Year	Peak chart positions	Certifications	Album
Title	Year	ZA	Certifications	Album
"Imali" (featuring Zakes Bantwini, Nana Atta)	2021	1	RiSA: Platinum	Imizamo
"Gemini's" (Karyendasoul, Da Capo)	2022	—		Anjunadeep Explorations 22
"Umthandazo" (featuring Ami Faku)	2022	—		We Live 4 Our Music
"Something More" (featuring Jordan Arts)	2023	—		We Live 4 Our Music
"Jacaranda" (featuring Msaki)	2023	—		We Live 4 Our Music
"B27"	2024	—		Anjunadeep South Africa
"Isibani" (Dazzie Funk, Karyendasoul, Yamke)	2024	—		Non-album single
"iSambulo"	2024	—		Non-album single
"You're Light" (Sun-El Musician, Msaki, Karyendasoul)	2025	—		Non-album single
"Don Rosado" (Karyendasoul, Drega)	2026	—		Non-album single
"—" denotes a recording that did not chart or was not released in that territory.

== Awards and nominations ==
=== Dance Music Awards South Africa ===
Year	Nominee / work	Award	Result	Ref.
2019	"Any Other Way"	Best House Record	Nominated	

=== Metro FM Music Awards ===
Year	Nominee / work	Award	Result	Ref.
2023	"Umthandazo" featuring Ami Faku	Best House Song	Nominated	

=== South African Music Awards ===
Year	Nominee / work	Award	Result	Ref.
2022	"iMali"	Best Collaboration	Nominated	
2023	"Au dede" – Karyendasoul	Remix of the Year	Nominated	
