= Yini Sdakwa =

2021 song by ThakzinDJ, Tee Jay and Sir Trill

Single by ThackzinDJ, Tee Jay and Sir Trill featuring Dlala Thukzin, Mpura, Nkosazana Daughter, Rascoe Kaos and Moscow

from the album 1 000 000 Amapiano Seconds (Kings Of The Surface)
- Language: Zulu language
- English title: What is it Drunkard?
- Released: 23 July 2021
- Recorded: 2021
- Genre: Amapiano
- Length: 6:05
- Label: Neo Walts and Probst Junction; Def Jam Africa
- Songwriter(s): Thuthuka Zindlovu; Mongezi Stuurman; Moscow; Nkosazana Daughter
- Producer(s): ThackzinDJ; Tee Jay

Dlala Thukzin singles chronology
"Phuze" (2021)	"Yini Sdakwa" (2021)	"Phuze Remix" (2021)

ThackzinDJ singles chronology
"Kuzohlangana" (2021)	"Yini Sdakwa" (2021)	"Lwandle" (2021)

Music video
- "Yini Sdakwa" (Official video) on YouTube

Official audio
- "Yini Sdakwa" on YouTube

Lyric video
- "Yini Sdakwa (Lyric video)" on YouTube

"Yini Sdakwa" is a single by South African record producers ThackzinDJ, Tee Jay and singer-songwriter Sir Trill taken from the prior producers' collaborative studio album 1 000 000 Amapiano Seconds (Kings Of The Surface) (2021). It was released on 23 July 2021 through Neo Walts and Probst Junction and Def Jam Recordings Africa with exclusive license from Universal Music South Africa, features guest appearances from Dlala Thukzin, Mpura, Nkosazana Daughter, Rascoe Kaos and Moscow.

In 2022 the song was certified Platinum by the Recording Industry of South Africa (RiSA), and was nominated for Best Music Video of the Year at the 28th annual of the South African Music Awards.

== Music video ==
The songs "Phuze" and "Yini Sdakwa" were recorded prior to Mpura's passing. With the video being released on 13 August 2021 via YouTube, unfortunately Mpura was not around to take part in the shooting sessions, therefore they used clips from "Phuze" music video to pay tribute since the songs were supposedly recorded on the same day. As of November 2023, the music sits on 13,8 million views.

== Charts ==
Chart performance for "Yini Sdakwa"
Chart (2021)	Peak position
South Africa (TOSAC)	15

== Certification and sales ==
Region	Certification	Certified units/sales
South Africa (RISA)	Platinum	20,000^{‡}
^{‡} Sales+streaming figures based on certification alone.

== Awards and nominations ==
Year	Award ceremony	Category	Recipient/Nominated work	Results	Ref.
2022	South African Music Awards	Best Music Video of the Year	"Yini Sdakwa"	Nominated	
