= Dlala Thukzin =

South African DJ and record producer

- Born: Thuthuka Wandile Zindlovu; 25 April 1997 (age 29); Lamontville, Durban, South Africa
- Occupations: DJ; record producer
- Years active: 2016–present
- Awards: Full list
- Musical career
- Also known as: Uncle Dlala
- Genres: Gqom; 3-step; afro tech
- Instruments: Sampler; DAW; FL Studio
- Label: Dlala Records
- Website: iG.com/dlalathukzin

Thuthuka Wandile Zindlovu, prominently known as Dlala Thukzin is a South African DJ and record producer born and bred in Lamontville, KwaZulu-Natal. He is famous for his versatility of blending amapiano and afro tech with gqom.

Zindlovu came to prominence subsequent to producing Babes Wodumo's "Umngan'wami" taken from his 2016 studio album Gqom Queen, Vol. 1.

In 2021, Thukzin released "Phuze" and "Phuze Remix" with guest appearances from Zaba, Mpura, Sir Trill and Rascoe Kaos, the prior and latter certified Gold and Platinum respectively by the Recording Industry of South Africa (RiSA). In 2023, he released "iPlan" from his extended play (EP) Permanent Music 3 (2023), which peaked at number one on Local Streaming Chart Top 10 of The Official South African Charts, number one on Local & International Streaming Chart Top 10, and number one Billboard South Africa songs. In addition the song was certified 2× Platinum in South Africa.

His single "AmaGear" with Zee Nxumalo, Funky Qla, featuring MK Productions released on 5 July 2024. The song debuted number 5 on Local Streaming Top 10.

== Discography ==
- Permanent Music (2020)
- Permanent Music 2 (2021)
- Summer Banger (with Funky Qla) (2021)
- Finally Famous (2022)
- Permanent Music 3 (2023)
- 031 Studio Camp (2024)
- Finally Famous Too (2024)
- 031 Studio Camp 2.0 (2025)
- MAYVIS (2025)
- Smoothie (with Funky Qla) (2026)

== Singles ==
=== As lead artist ===
List of singles as lead artist, with selected chart positions and certifications, showing year released and album name
Title	Year	Peak chart positions	Certifications	Album
Title	Year	ZA	Certifications	Album
"Classic" (featuring Sizwe Ntuli)	2020	—		
"Phuze" (featuring Zaba)	2021	—	RiSA: Gold	
"Overtone" (Kususa, Dlala Thukzin)	2021	—		
"Phuze Remix" (featuring Zaba, Sir Trill, Mpura, Rascoe Kaos)	2021	—	RiSA: 2x platinum	
"iStofu" (Zaba, Dlala Thukzin)	2021	—		
"Inkinga (2023 Remastered Version)" (Kvy-ix, Dlala Thukzin)	2023	—		
"Danki Bawo" (Dlala Thukzin, Sykes)	2023	—		
"C&C"	2023	—		
"Hey Sister" (DJ Bongz, Dlala Thukzin, Funky Qla)	2023	—		
"FOMO" (Goldmax, Dlala Thukzin, Funky Qla featuring Zee Nxumalo, Beast Rsa)	2024	—		
"Fire Dance"	2024	—		
"031 Studio Camp" (Dlala Thukzin, Funky Qla)	2024			
"Ama Gear" (Dlala Thukzin, Funky Qla, Zee Nxumalo featuring Mk Productions)	2024	5		Finally Famous Too
"Nkosi" (Darque, Kabza De Small, Dlala Thukzin, Sino Msolo)	2024	—		Non-album single
"Awe Mah" (Zee Nxumalo, Dlala Thukzin featuring Shakes & Les, MK Productions, Funky Qla)	2026	—		Non-album single
"—" denotes a recording that did not chart or was not released in that territory.

== Other charted and certified songs ==
List of other charted songs, with selected chart positions and certifications, showing year released and album name
Title	Year	Peak chart positions	Certifications	Album
Title	Year	ZA	Certifications	Album
"Sohlala Sisonke" (Dlala Thukzin, featuring Zeh McGeba, MK Productions)	2024	6		Finally Famous Too
"—" denotes a recording that did not chart or was not released in that territory.

== Awards and nominations ==
Dlala Thukzin leads the 2023 South African Dance Music Awards nomination list with four nominations, alongside Kabza de Small and Skye Wanda.

Year	Award ceremony	Category	Recipient/Nominated work	Results	Ref.
2022	South African Music Awards	Best Gqom Album	Summer Banger	Nominated	
2022	South African Music Awards	Best Music Video of the Year	"Yini Sdakwa"	Nominated	
2024	South African Music Awards	Best Dance Album	Permanent Music 3	Pending	
2024	South African Music Awards	Best Collaboration	"iPlan"	Pending	
2024	All Africa Music Awards	Best Male Southern Africa	Himself	Pending	
2024	Dstv Content Creator Awards	Song of the Year	"iPlan"	Pending	
2024	South African Dance Music Awards	Best Dance	"iPlan"	Pending	
2024	South African Dance Music Awards	Best Male DJ	Herself	Pending	
2024	South African Dance Music Awards	Best Live Act	Herself	Pending	
2024	South African Dance Music Awards	Best Dance Album	Permanent Music 3	Pending	
2025	Metro FM Music Awards	Best Dance Song	"Sohlala Sisonke"	Nominated	
2025	Metro FM Music Awards	Best Male Artist	Himself	Nominated	
2025	Metro FM Music Awards	Best Produced Album	Finally Famous Too	Nominated	
2025	BET Awards	Best New International Act	Himself	Pending	
