= 2022 Basadi in Music Awards =

South African music award ceremony

- Sponsored by: SAMPRA
- Date: October 15, 2022
- Venue: Gallagher Convention Centre, Midrand
- Country: South Africa
- Hosted by: Moozlie; Anele Zondo
- Website: basadiinmusicawards.co.za

The 2022 Basadi in Music Awards is the first edition of Basadi in Music Awards. The ceremony took place at Gallagher Convention Centre, Midrand on October 15, 2022, hosted by Anele Zondo and Moozlie streamed live on YouTube and Instagram.

== Background ==
Nominations across 16 categories were announced on July 6, 2022. 4 categories Kontemporêre Kunstenaar van die Jaar, Music Video Director of the Year, Gqom Artist of the Year and Kwaito Artist of the Year were cancelled due to low public voting.

== Winners and nominees ==
Below the list are the nominees were announced on July 6, 2022, live on YouTube and Kaya 959 by Dineo Ranaka.

Below list are nominees. Winners are listed first in bold.

Artist of the Year	Business Achievement Award
**Makhadzi**; Azana; DBN Gogo; Holly Rey; Nomfundo Moh; Pabi Cooper; Simmy	**Dineo Ranaka**; DJ Zinhle; Lerato Kganyago
Afro Pop Artist of the Year	SAMPRA Artist of the Year
**Phumla**; Amahle; Amanda Black; Nomfundo Moh; Skye Wanda	**Boohle**; DJ Fonzi; Kamo Mphela; Lady Du; Pabi Cooper
Dance Artist of the Year	DJ of the Year
**Lizwi**; Simmy; Lady X; Rethabile Khumalo; Laloya Fox	**Lamiez Holworthy**; DJ Zinhle; Lerato Kganyago; DBN Gogo; Lesego
Entertainment Radio Presenter of the Year	Gospel Artist of the Year
**Lerato Kganyago**; Anele Mdoda; Jabulile Vilakazi; Lebo Jojo Mokoena; Minenhle Masondo	**Rethabile Skhosana**; Chairo; Mmatema; Puleng March; Tsusie
Rap/Hip Hop Artist of the Year	Social Media Influencer of the Year
**Gigi Lamayne**; Boity; Moozlie; Nadia Nakai; Yashna	**Khanyisa**; Bad Milk; Mandz.Hot.Not; Mihlali Ndamase; Yaya Mavundla
SAMRO Songwriter of the Year	Pop Artist of the Year
**Skye wanda**; Amahle; Azana; Jamie Lee Sexton; Msaki	**Holly Rey**; Bonj; Jacky Carpede; Jamie Lee Sexton; Shekinah
Jazz Artist of the Year	Newcomer of the Year
**Zodwa Mabena**; Linda Shabalala; Shannon Mowday; Thembelihle Dunjana; Zoë Modiga	**Ntomza**; Buhle Womculo; Chairo; Paige
Traditional Artist of the Year	Song of the Year
**Basetsana Ba Setse**; Candy Tsamandebele; Mphoruku Moritini; Ntunja; Zizipho Radebe	**"Banyana ke Bafana" - Pabi Cooper**; "Bambelela" - DBN Gogo featuring Pabi Copper, Young Stunna; "Ghanama" - Makhadzi featuring Prince Benza; "Phakade Lami" - Nomfundo Moh featuring Ami Faku, Sha Sha; "Questions" - Shekinah
Entertainment Journalist of the Year	Entertainment Radio Producer of the Year
**Amandla Maliba**; Doreen Molefe; Qhama Dayile; Kedibone Modise; Patience Bambalele	**Prudence Mathebula**; Hlegiwe Khumalo; Nthabiseng Mamabolo; Nthabiseng Molapo; Phila Tyekana

== Special awards ==
=== Joburg Tourism Company Humanitarian Award ===
- Cynthia Dinalane

=== SAMPRA Highest Airplay ===
- Shekhinah

=== Cappasso Most Streamed Song ===
- Nomcebo Zikode – "Xola Moya Wam"

=== CEO Trailblazer Award ===
- Zanele Mbokazi

=== Lifetime Achievement Award ===
- Yvonne Chaka Chaka
- Abigail Kubeka
