= IMali =

"iMali"

Single by Karyendasoul, Zakes Bantwini featuring Nana Atta

from the EP Imizamo
- Released: October 22, 2021
- Recorded: June 2021
- Genre: Afro tech
- Length: 7:16
- Label: Universal Music
- Producers: Bonga Ntozini; Zakhele Madida

Karyendasoul singles chronology
"iMali" (2021)	"Umthandazo" (2022)

Zakes Bantwini singles chronology
"Osama" (2021)	"Imali" (2021)	"Mama Thula" (2023)

Nana Atta singles chronology
"Abafana" (2020)	"Imali" (2021)	"Libalele" (2022)

"iMali" is a single by South African DJ & Producer Karyendasoul and Zakes Bantwini featuring South African singer Nana Atta, released on October 22, 2021, through Universal Music as EP's lead single. It was produced by Bonga Ntozini and Zakhele Madida.

The song debuted number one in South Africa. It was certified platinum by the Recording industry of South Africa (RiSA).

== Commercial performance ==
The song topped number one in South Africa on both Gagasi FM top 30 and Metro FM top 40.

"iMali" was certified platinum in South Africa.

=== Awards and nominations ===
"iMali" was nominated for Best Collaboration at 28th South African Music Awards.

Year	Nominee / work	Award	Result	Ref.
2022	"iMali"	Best Collaboration	Nominated	

== Certifications ==
Region	Certification	Certified units/sales
South Africa (RISA)	Platinum	20,000^{‡}
^{‡} Sales+streaming figures based on certification alone.

== Track listing ==
Digital download and streaming

1. "iMali" – 7:16

== Personnel ==
All credits for "iMali" are adapted from AllMusic.

- Nana Atta – Primary Artist, Vocals
- Zakes Bantwini – Musical Producer, Primary Artist
- Karyendasoul – Musical Producer, Primary Artist
- Zakhele Madida – Composer
- Bonga Ntozini – Producer
