= Killer Kau =

South African rapper, dancer, and producer (1998–2021)

- Born: Sakhile Hlatshwayo; 5 July 1998; Soweto, South Africa
- Died: 9 August 2021 (aged 23) near Rustenburg, South Africa
- Genres: House; Amapiano
- Occupations: Singer; Rapper; Dancer; Record producer
- Instrument: Vocals
- Years active: 2016–2021

Sakhile Hlatshwayo (5 July 1998 – 9 August 2021), known professionally as Killer Kau, was a South African singer, dancer and record producer best known for his hit songs "Tholukuthi Hey" and "Amaneighbour"

== Early life and career ==
Killer Kau was born on 5 July 1998 in Soweto, South Africa. He grew up singing in church before he joined the Stay PC church choir, singing baritone. He also went on to join the African Heavenly Soul Singers male choir.

His music career began when he was still attending school and when he wrote his matric in 2017. He rose to fame when he posted a video singing his song "Tholukuthi Hey", which went viral and caught the attention of DJ Euphonik.

== Awards and nominations ==
Year	Award ceremony	Prize	Result
2019	Dance Music Awards South Africa	Best Amapiano Record	Won
2021	SA Amapiano Music Awards	Best Amapiano Collaboration	Won

== Death ==
On 9 August 2021, Killer Kau died in a car crash on his way to a gig, alongside amapiano musician Mpura and the upcoming artists The Voice, Thando Tot and Thando Td. The car crash left only one female alive, the lady claimed to be one of Mpura and Killer Kau's friends.
