= Kasango =

South African DJ

- Born: Kasmario Thulani Ike Fankis; Welkom, Free State, South Africa
- Origin: South Africa
- Genres: House; Afro-house
- Occupations: DJ; Record producer
- Years active: 2010–present

Kasmario Thulani Ike Fankis, professionally known as Kasango, is a South African DJ and music producer from Welkom, Free State. His musical interest began at the age of 16, rose to fame with his number-one single "Osama", released in 2021, chartered for 12 consecutive weeks.

Kasango attended Soul Candi Institute of Music where he studied Advanced Music Production and Music Business in 2010.

== Career ==
His single "Osama" with Zakes Bantwini was released on 10 September 2021. The song chartered number 1 on RAMS chart for 12 consecutive weeks.

== Singles ==
=== As lead artist ===
List of singles as lead artist, with selected chart positions and certifications, showing year released and album name
Title	Year	Peak chart positions	Certifications	Album
Title	Year	ZA	Certifications	Album
"One Night" (Kasango featuring Bobbi Fallon)	2020	—		Non-album single
"Let You Go" (DJEFF, Kasango featuring Betty Gray)	2021	—		Non-album single
"Closer / Ma Vie Celeste" (Kasango, Kosmas)	2021	—		Non-album single
"Osama" (Zakes Bantwini, Kasango"	2021	1	4× Platinum	Ghetto King
"Sikelela" (TNS, Kasango featuring Bukeka)	2022	—		Non-album single
"Ilizwi" (Citizen Deep, Kasango featuring Bukeka)	2022	—		Arcade
"Dance for Me" (Like Me, Kasango featuring Julia Church)	2023	—		Non-album single
"Solitude" (Kasango, Auguste, Tayllor)	2023	—		Non-album single
"Best Friend" (4rain, Kasango featuring Jimmy Nevis)	2023	—		Non-album single
"Save a Prayer" (Kasango, Leo Guardo, Leo Gira featuring Jordan Grace)	2023	—		Non-album single
"A.I.E" (Kasango, Alejandro Garrido)	2026	—		Non-album single
"—" denotes a recording that did not chart or was not released in that territory.

== Achievements ==
=== Miami Electronic Dance Music Awards ===
Year	Nominee / work	Award	Result	Ref.
2026	"Fire Fire"	Song of the Year	Won	

=== South African Music Awards ===
Year	Nominee / work	Award	Result	Ref.
2022	"Osama"	SAMRO Highest Radio Airplay Composer	Won	
2022	"Osama"	Best Collaboration	Won	
