= Phuze =

2021 song by Dlala Thukzin

Single by Dlala Thukzin featuring Zaba
- Language: Zulu language
- English title: Drink
- Released: 26 March 2021
- Genre: Afro tech; Dance
- Length: 6:07
- Label: Ingrooves; Dlala Records
- Songwriters: Tsholofelo Daka; Mongezi Thomas Stuurman; Mzwakhe Tumelo Zwane; Wonder Zama Mngwengwe
- Composer: Thuthuka Zindlovu
- Producer: Dlala Thukzin

Dlala Thukzin singles chronology
"Kunini Sivalelwe" (2020)	"Phuze" (2021)	"Phuze (Remix)" (2021)

Official audio
- "Phuze"

"Phuze" is a single by South African DJ and record producer known under the alias of Dlala Thukzin, it was released on 26 March 2021 through Ingrooves on behalf of Dlala Records and it features vocals from Zaba. In mid-2023 it was certified Gold by the Recording Industry of South Africa.

The single (and remix version) stirred a heated argument on Twitter when a house music record producer DJ Shimza labeled the song afrohouse when people couldn't figure out whether it is amapiano, gqom or afro tech. Dlala Thukzin never commented on the matter to clarify the genre of the song.

== Music video ==
On 21 October 2021 the visuals of "Phuze" were published by Dlala Thukzin via YouTube, and has accumulated over 4 million views as of September 2023.

== Remix ==
"Phuze (Remix)"

Remix by Dlala Thukzin featuring Mpura, Zaba, Sir Trill and Rascoe Kaos
- Language: Zulu language
- English title: Drink
- Released: 30 July 2021
- Recorded: July 2021
- Genre: Afro tech; Dance
- Label: Ingrooves; Dlala Records
- Songwriters: Tsholofelo Daka; Mongezi Thomas Stuurman; Mzwakhe Tumelo Zwane; Wonder Zama Mngwengwe
- Composer: Thuthuka Wandile Zindlovu
- Producer: Dlala Thukzin

Dlala Thukzin chronology
"Phuze" (2021)	"Phuze (Remix)" (2021)	"iStofu" (2021)

Music video
- "Phuze (Official music video)"

Official audio
- "Phuze (Remix)"

Audio sample
- A 8-seconds sample of "Phuze Remix": file; help

On 30 July 2021 Dlala Thukzin released the remix version of "Phuze" through Ingrooves and Dlala Records, it features guest appearances from Mpura, Zaba, Sir Trill and Rascoe Kaos. On 8 June 2023 it was certified Platinum by the Recording Industry of South Africa (RiSA).

== Charts ==
Chart performance for "Phuze"
Chart (2021)	Peak position
South Africa (TOSAC)	14

== Certifications ==
Region	Certification	Certified units/sales
South Africa (RISA)	Gold	10,000^{‡}
South Africa (RISA) Phuze Remix	Platinum	20,000^{‡}
^{‡} Sales+streaming figures based on certification alone.
