= Soft Life =

2022 song by Nomfundo Moh

Song by Nomfundo Moh

from the album Amagama
- Released: January 28, 2022
- Studio: Isigingci Media
- Genre: Afro-pop
- Length: 4:08
- Label: Universal
- Songwriter: Nomfundo Ngcobo
- Producer: Martin Manqoba Sosibo

"Soft Life" is a song by South African singer Nomfundo Moh, taken from her debut studio album Amagama (2022). The song was certified 3× Platinum by the Recording Industry of South Africa (RiSA).

== Commercial performance ==
"Soft life" was certified 3× Platinum by the Recording Industry of South Africa (RiSA).

=== Accolades ===
The song won Highest Airplay Song at 2023 Basadi in Music Awards and nominated for Record of the Year at 29th South African Music Awards .

Year	Nominee / work	Award	Result	Ref.
2023	"Soft Life"	Highest AirPlay Song	Won	
2023	"Soft Life"	Record of the Year	Nominated	

== Certifications ==
Region	Certification	Certified units/sales
South Africa (RISA)	3× Platinum	60,000^{‡}
^{‡} Sales+streaming figures based on certification alone.

== Charts ==
Chart performance for "Soft Life"
Chart (2024)	Peak position
South Africa (RiSA)	3
