= 2023 Basadi in Music Awards =

South African music awards

- Sponsored by: SAMPRA
- Date: August 12, 2023
- Venue: Joburg Theatre, Braamfontein
- Country: South Africa
- Hosted by: Unathi Nkayi

Highlights
- Most awards: Lwah Ndlunkulu (2)
- Most nominations: Lwah Ndlunkulu (4)
- Website: basadiinmusicawards.co.za

Television/radio coverage
- Network: SABC 2

The 2023 Basadi in Music Awards is the second edition of Basadi in Music Awards. The ceremony was held at Joburg Theatre, Braamfontein on August 12, 2023, hosted by Unathi Nkayi.

Lwah Ndlunkulu leads nominees with 4 nominations.

== Background ==
2023 Basadi in Music Awards nominees were announced on June 29, 2023, voting opened same day, to be closed on July 24. 2023 ceremony introduced new categories Basadi in Music In Africa, Reggae Artist of the Year and Nando's Emerging Artist of the Year.

Khanyi Mbau was initially announced as event host, before Unathi Nkayi announced as new host on August 12, 2023.

The ceremony will be broadcast live on SABC 2, on August 27, 2023.

== Performers ==
=== Premiere ceremony ===
The performers for the ceremony were announced on August 8, 2023.

List of performers at the premiere ceremony
| Artist(s) | Song(s) |
|---|---|
| Skye Wanda | |
| CiCi | |
| Mpho Sebina | |
| Maleh | |

== Winners and nominees ==
Below list are winners and nominees. Winners are listed first in bold face.

| Amapiano Artist of the Year | Dance Artist of the Year |
|---|---|
| **Khanyisa Jaceni**; Pabi Cooper; Nkosazana Daughter; Boohle; Kamo Mphela | **Nuzu Deep**; Maline Aura; Skye Wanda; Simmy; Manana Highness |
| DJ of the Year | Hip Hop Artist of the Year |
| **Lady Amar**; Uncle Waffles; Ms Cosmo; Lamez Holworthy; Pru Luv | **Nadia Nakai**; Rogue; Faith K; Fifi Cooper; Ney The Bae |
| Pop Artist of the Year | Song of the Year |
| **Holly Rey**; Jamie-Lee Sexton; Tamara Dey; Herrah; Rah Punzl | **"Ithuba" - Lwah Ndlunkulu featuring Siya Ntuli**; "Undenzantoni" - Boohle featuring Murumba Pitch & Cabba Cannal; "Waga Bhetje" - Pabi Cooper featuring Mellow and Sleazy; "Hamba Juba" - Lady Amar, Cici, JL and Murumba Pitch; "Yahyuppiyah" - Uncle Waffles, Tony Duardo, Justin, Pcee, Eeque, and Chley |
| SAMRO songwriter of the Year | Afro Pop Artist of the Year |
| **Msaki**; Gloria Bosman; Phumla; Lioness Mohoje; Jamie-Lee Sexton | **Kelly Khumalo**; Lwah Ndlunkulu; Brenda Mtambo; Lioness Mohoje; Nomfundo Moh |
| Traditional Artist of the Year | Stylist of the Year |
| **Dr Sophy – Vamaseve wa Mina**; Candy Tsamandebele ft. Henny C – Rato Laka; Dr Buselaphi ft. Camagwini & Shota – Uma Khanda Khanda; MmaAusi – Chiba le Kgomo; Pleasure Tsa Manyalo – Mahlako Roko Ya Mosadi | **Odirile**; Boogy Maboi; Lindo Mnguni; Lindu Stylist; Nhlanhla Mafu |
| Artist of the Year | Duo/Collaboration of the Year |
| **Lwah Ndlunkulu**; Lizwi; Makhadzi; Skye Wanda; Uncle Waffles | **Qwabe Twins – "Sobonana"**; Bontle Smith, Nia Pearl and Nicol Elocin – "My Love"; Group Chat – "Mama"; Ney the Bae and Nadia Nakai – "Thick Slim"; Txc And Khanyisa – "Vuka Mawulele" |
| Nando's Emerging Artist of the Year | Entertainment Journalist of the Year |
| **Noluthando Ngema**; Black Villain; Buzzi Lee; Gemma Fassie; Qaqamba Ntshinka | **Masego Seemela – Sowetan Smag**; Amanda Matshaka – Sa Positive News; Andiswa Ngenyane – Daily Sun; Nokubongwa Phenyane – Isolezwe; Nokuthula Zwane – News24 |
| Entertainment Radio Presenter of the Year | Entertainment Radio Producer of the Year |
| **Khutso Theledi – The Break Away (Metro FM)**; Lerato Kganyago – Midday Link Up (Metro FM); Lethabo Lejoy Mathatho – Monate Breakfast Show (Thobela FM); Mittah Ledimo – The Kickstart on The Bloem Rise Breakfast Show (Radio Bloem); Thando Thabethe – 947 Drive With (Thando 947) | **Phila Tyekana – The Touchdown (Metro FM)**; Ayanda Melansi – Jabul' Ujule (Ukhozi FM); Kgoshigadi Rangata – Power Experience (Power FM); Masego Tlhakanye – 5 Weekend Breakfast (5FM); Pru Luv – Midday Link Up (Metro FM) |
| Entertainment TV Producer of the Year | Gospel Artist of the Year |
| **Philisa Bidi – Massive Music (Chanel O)**; Layinah Petersen – Espresso Show (SABC 3); Mathawe Matsapola – The Morning Show (eTV); Mbali Gamede – Lifestyle 101 (Soweto TV); Thapelo Mowela – Morning Live (SABC 2) | **Ntokozo Mbambo – Ngcwele Nkosi**; Athandie Mvusi – Thixo Akunangqaleko; Bucy Radebe – Vuka Jona; Hle – Take Heart; Mmatema – My Time Is Now |
| Jazz Artist of the Year | Music TV Presenter of the Year |
| **Thesis ZA – Chos**; Gloria Bosman – Bonga Njalo; Katalia – Bophelo; Thandi Ntuli – Inkululeko | **Ntombee Mzolo – Yash' Ingoma**; Pamela Mtanga – Massive Music; Senelisiwe Mbongwa – Soweto TV Gospel Xplosion |
| Music Video of the Year | Newcomer of the Year |
| **Ney The Bae ft. Given Zulu – Ingwe**; Jamie Lee-Sexton – Run Run Run; Kamo Mphela ft. Various Artists – Ghost; Lwah Ndlunkulu – Ngiyeza; Pabi Cooper ft. Mello & Sleazy – Waga Bietjie | **Group Chat – Mama**; Dimahr – Uptown Girls; Dimakatso Lee – Holokile; Eves Manxeba Ft May Jack – Ukukhanya; Kele M – Awake |
| Reggae Artist of the Year | Social Media Influencer of the Year |
| **Empres Lily – One Day**; Delta The Leo – Pum Pum; Dimahr – Uptown Girls; Reign Afrika – Bazali Bam; Zama Sunshine – Tell Me | **Tshidi Kekana Manganye**; Mandz Not Hot; Nelisiwe Sibiya; Pamela Mtanga; Thato Immaculate |

== Special awards ==
Non-voting category recipients

=== CEO Mosadi In Business Achievement Award Recipients ===
- Nhlanhla Mafu for NN Vintage
- Thando Thabethe for Thabooty’s Underwear and Shapewear
- Boity for Be You By Boity and BT Signature

=== Lifetime Achievement Awards ===
- Angélique Kidjo
- Letta Mbulu
- PJ Powers

=== Highest AirPlay Song ===
- "Soft Life" - Nomfundo Moh

=== Mosadi In Music In Africa Award Recipients ===
- Mpho Sebina (Botswana)
  - Berita (Zimbabwe)
  - Maleh (Lesotho)
  - Sefa (Ghana)
