= Mnqobi Yazo =

South African singer-songwriter

- Born: November 23, 1992 (age 33); Maphumulo, KwaZulu-Natal South Africa
- Occupations: Singer; songwriter; Actor; Director
- Years active: 2018–present

Mnqobi Yazo (born; Mnqobi Lindokuhle Msimango) is a South African singer-songwriter. Born in kwaMaphumulo, and raised in Durban, KwaZulu-Natal, released his first project Iscephu in 2018. After he signed a record deal with Mabala Noise, his debut album Impi (2020), which incorporated elements of African trap, Afro-pop, and maskandi, was certified platinum in South Africa.

Yazo has also pursued an acting career. In 2020, he made his on-screen feature debut on television drama series The River, and appeared as a guest on the television series Durban Gen (2022).

== Career ==
Mnqobi began his musical interest as a rapper while he was still attending primary school. After his matric he studied Performing Art at the Creative Arts College and obtained diploma.

His first project EP titled Icephu was released in 2018. Shortly after he signed a record deal with Mabala Noise, his debut studio album Impi was released on October 30, 2020. It features Nobuhle, Shwi Nomtekhala, and Musiholiq. The album was certified platinum in South Africa.

In November 2020, he made his screen debut on The River playing a role of Steven.

i-Stiff was released on November 25, 2021.

In February 2022, he landed on a supporting role Durban Gen telenova.

Yazo third studio album UBHOKO, was released on January 26, 2024. Like his previous album, UBHOKO is an afro pop record incoparated with afro zazz, isicathamiya-style drawl and maskandi falsetto. It explores themes of heritage, love, and the essence of African descent.

In February 2023, Yazo was announced as Up Next artist in South Africa by Apple Music.

== Artistry ==
=== Influences ===
Yazo cited Bhekumuzi Luthuli, Ladysmith Black Mambazo and Oliver Mtukudzi as his major musical influences.

== Discography ==
=== Studio albums ===
- Iscephu (2018)
- Impi (2020
- Istiff (2021)
- Ubhoko (2024)
- uMculo (2025)

=== As lead artist ===
List of singles as lead artist, with selected chart positions and certifications, showing year released and album name
Title	Year	Peak chart positions	Certifications	Album
Title	Year	ZA	Certifications	Album
"Sabela"	2020	—		Non-album single
"Amathafa" (Sayfar, Mnqobi Yazo)	2021	—		Non-album single
"Ngisho" (EmSoul, Mnqobi Yazo, Wiseman Ncube)	2022	—		Non-album single
"Push Push" (featuring Nomfundo Moh, Leverage, Bobo Jay Nzima, Starr Healer, Thando Zide)	2024	—		Non-album single
"—" denotes a recording that did not chart or was not released in that territory.

=== As featured artist ===
List of singles as featured artist, with selected chart positions and certifications, showing year released and album name
Title	Year	Peak chart positions	Certifications	Album
Title	Year	ZA	Certifications	Album
"Angisafuni Ngami" (Nomakhosini featuring Mnqobi Yazo)	2025	18		Non-album single
"—" denotes a recording that did not chart or was not released in that territory.

=== Guest appearances ===
Title	Year	Other artist(s)	Album
"Bandijongile"	2023	Zonke	Embo
"iLembe"	2026	Sun-EL Musician	Under The Sun

== Filmography ==
Year	Film	Role	Genre	Ref.
2020	The River	Steven	TV series	
2022	Durban Gen		TV series	
2023	Smoke And Mirrors	Dlozi	TV series	

== Awards ==
Year	Nominee / work	Award	Result	Ref.
2021	Himself	Newest Find	Nominated	
