= Asanda (song) =

2022 song by Kususa feat. Zakes Bantwini

"Asanda" is a single by South African duo Kususa and Argento Dust featuring Zakes Bantwini from their extended play Ubomi, it was released on November 11, 2022, through Universal and Black Noise Music Africa.

== Accolades ==
=== Metro FM Music Awards ===
Year	Nominee / work	Award	Result	Ref.
2023	"Asanda"	Best House Song	Nominated	
2023	"Asanda"	Best Collaborative Song	Nominated	

== Personnel ==
Credits for "Asanda" are adapted from AllMusic.

- Argento Dust - Musical Producer, Primary Artist, Producer
- Joshua Sihle Sokweba - Composer
- Kususa - Musical Producer, Primary Artist, Producer
- Minenhle Dlazi - Composer
- Mncedi Tshicila - Composer
- Zakes Bantwini - Primary Artist
- Zakhele Madida - Composer

== Certifications ==
Region	Certification	Certified units/sales
South Africa (RISA)	Platinum	40,000^{‡}
^{‡} Sales+streaming figures based on certification alone.

== Release history ==
Region	Date	Format	Label
South Africa	11 November 2022	Digital download, Streaming	Universal, Back Noise Music Africa
