= Umlando =

2022 single by Toss, 9umba, and Mdoovar featuring multiple artists

Single by Toss, 9umba, and Mdoovar featuring Sino Msolo, Lady Du, Young Stunna, Sir Trill, and Slade

from the EP Umlando
- Language: Isizulu
- English title: History
- Released: January 13, 2022
- Recorded: 2021–2022
- Genre: Amapiano
- Label: Soweto Cool
- Producers: Letlotlo-la-bakuena Letlatsa; Mduduzi Memela

"Umlando" is a song by Toss, 9umba, and Mdoovar featuring Sino Msolo, Lady Du, Young Stunna, Sir Trill, and Slade released on January 13, 2022. It was produced by Letlotlo-la-bakuena Letlatsa, and Mduduzi Memela.

It debuted at number 3 in South Africa. The song was certified platinum in South Africa.

== Commercial performance ==
The song debuted number 3 on Apple Music charts Top 100 and surpassed 7.5 million streams on digital streaming platforms.

"Umlando" was certified platinum in South Africa.

== Accolades ==
Year	Nominee / work	Award	Result	Ref.
2022	"Umlando"	TikTok Viral Song of the Year	Won	
2023	"Umlando"	Music Video of the Year	Pending	

== Charts ==
Weekly chart performance for "Umlando"
Chart (2022)	Peak position
South Africa (EMA)	2

== Release history ==
Region	Date	Format	Version	Label	Ref.
South Africa	January 13, 2022	Digital download	Original		
