= Into Ingawe =

Single by Sun-El Musician and Ami Faku
- Released: June 7, 2019
- Recorded: 2019
- Genre: Deep house; Afro house
- Length: 4:30
- Songwriters: Sanele Sithole; Amanda Faku
- Producer: Sanele Sithole

Sun-El Musician singles chronology
"Ubomi Abumanga" (2019)	"Into Ingawe" (2019)	"Uhuru" (2020)

Ami Faku singles chronology
"Ndikhethe Wena" (2019)	"Into Ingawe" (2019)	"Inde Lendlela" (2019)

"Into Ingawe" is a single by South African DJ Sun-El Musician and South African singer Ami Faku, released on June 7, 2019 by EL World Music.

The song was certified 3× platinum by the Recording Industry of South Africa (RiSA).

== Commercial performance ==
The song was certified 3× platinum by the Recording Industry of South Africa (RiSA).

It peaked at number 7 on Deezer’s Top 10 local tracks in South Africa.

== Composition and lyrics ==
"Into Ingawe" is a deep house, mid-tempo song set in with common time composed with 108 BPM, that features influences from Afro beats and dance music on its production. It is composed in the key of E♭ and a major mode. The song was entirely written by Sanele Sithole and Amanda Faku. Lyrically the song is about how an individual's success is dependent upon person's choice to go after it. The track runs 4 minutes and 31 seconds long with a.

== Music video ==
"Into Ingawe" music video was released on November 21, 2019 on YouTube. It surpassed 1 million views in the first 3 weeks after its release.

== Certifications ==
Region	Certification	Certified units/sales
South Africa (RISA)	3× Platinum	60,000^{‡}
^{‡} Sales+streaming figures based on certification alone.

== Track listing ==
Digital download and streaming

1. "Into Ingawe" – 4:30

== Release history ==
Region	Date	Format	Version	Label	Ref.
South Africa	07 June 2019	Digital download	Original	EL World Music	
