= Culoe De Song =

South African DJ and music producer

- Born: Culolethu Zulu; 20 August 1990 (age 36)
- Origin: Eshowe, KwaZulu Natal, South Africa
- Genres: House, electronic, Afro house, Afro tech
- Occupations: Record producer, DJ
- Years active: 2007–present
- Labels: Soulistic Music (former); Innervisions; Mule Musiq; SSOH; DeSongMusic
- Website: CuloeDeSong.net

Culolethu Zulu (born 20 August 1990 in Eshowe, Kwazulu Natal), known commonly by his stage name Culoe De Song, is a South African record producer, DJ and sangoma. His first name, "Culolethu", is an IsiZulu name meaning "our song", and he is known as "Culo" or "Culoe" meaning "song"; the name is pronounced with a clicking "C", not to be erroneously pronounced like the Spanish word "culo", which rhymes with "cool". He released his first album, A Giant Leap, in 2009. In 2011, he released his album Elevation with the help of Kindnes Khupe, a Zimbabwean-born tribal mix DJ. Later, he released Exodus (2013). Culoe De Song recently won The Best Male Artist for the 2014 Metro FM Awards for his album Exodus, an album that was featured on Rolling Stone's (South Africa) Top 500 Albums of 2013. He also participated in the 2008 Red Bull Music Academy in Barcelona, Spain.

== Early life and career ==
He began his music career in early 2007 DJing in South Africa alongside local acts like Black Coffee and international visitors like Louie Vega and Rocco. Following his forays in DJing, Culoe De Song began exploring production where he collaborated with Black Coffee on the track "100 Zulu Warriors", who included the tunes tribal aural assault on his second album Have Another One. Culoe De Song was later signed to Black Coffee's label Soulistic Music and was selected as one of the worldwide participants to attend the 2008 Red Bull Music Academy held in Barcelona, Spain. This made him one of the youngest participant in the academy's history. While in Spain, Culoe De Song performed at Club Macerana and Fellini in Barcelona and was later invited to perform at Sonar in Spain. In 2009, Culoe De Song released the EP The Bright Forest on this German record label Innervisions. This release introduced him to a wider European audience and electronic scene.

Culoe De Song then started on his international showings while at the same time releasing his debut album, A Giant Leap, an album that went gold. The album got him award nominations in multiple categories, for the 2010 South African Music Awards, the Namibian Museke Awards, and the 2010 Metro FM awards. He released his second album, Elevation, in 2011, where he collaborated with France’s deep house DJ and producer Rocco as well as local South African acts, such as Goldfish and funk dub four piece 340ml.

The Japanese label Mule Musiq and German Label Innervisions released several singles centered on his Afrocentric rhythms and subtle digital textures. Culoe De Song continues to perform as a DJ at corporate events, clubs, and international music festivals.

Notable festivals performed at include the Smirnoff Night Life Exchange worldwide tour in São Paulo, Brazil, Amsterdam Dance Event and the Winter Music Conference in Miami, SolarFest (Spain), and also Weather (France), Oslo World Music Festival (Norway), Festival Week-end au bord de l’eau (Switzerland), and local South African festivals Oppikoppi, Rocking the Daisies, and JnB Start a Party. He also had a session at Boiler Room & Ballantine’s Stay True Johannesburg. He has performed alongside Seth Troxler, Richie Hawtin, Little Louie Vega, Carl Craig, Ame, DJs At Work, Rocco, Manoo, Ralf Gum, JoJo Flores, and Boddhi Satva.

Culoe De Song is growing with popularity as a South African icon being featured in the likes of Rolling Stone, Shook, The New Age (South Africa), GQ, and Raveline (Germany).

== Discography ==
=== Albums ===
- A Giant Leap (2009)
- Elevation (2011)
- Exodus (2013)
- Washa (2016)
- Life (2020)

=== Selected remixes ===
- Qness ft. Oluhle - "Fugama Unamathe" (Culoe De Song Serenity Mix)
- Black Coffee ft. Hugh Masekela - "We Are One" (2011)
- Black Coffee - "Crazy" (Culoe De Song Winter Remix) (2011)
- Ternielle Nelson - "African Woman" (Culoe De Song Remix) (2011)
- Claude Monnet and Torre Bros - "Megouli Awasse" (Culoe De Song Window of God Mix) (2011)
- Goldfish feat. Monique Hellenberg - "Call Me" (Culoe De Song Remix) (2011)
- Reggie Dokes - "Let Me Go" (Culoe De Song Zulu Spirit Mix) (2012)
- DJ Kent feat. Zaki Ibrahim - "Sunrise" (Culoe De Song Remix) (2013)
- Glenn Lewis - "Good One" (Culoe De Song Remix) (2013)

=== Selected singles and EP's ===
- The Bright Forrest EP (2009)
- "Fallen Siren" (2009)
- Webaba EP (2010)
- "Ambush" (2010)
- "Stig Boardersman" (2013)
- Medicine EP (2018)

=== DJ mixes ===
- RA 146 (2009) by Culoe De Song

== Awards and nominations ==
Year	Award Ceremony	Prize	Work/Recipient	Result
2010	South African Music Awards	Best New Artist	A Giant Leap	Nominated
2013	13th Metro FM Music Awards	Best Male Artist	Exodus	Won
