= Osama (song) =

Single by Zakes Bantwini & Kasango

from the album Ghetto King
- Released: September 10, 2021
- Recorded: 2021
- Length: 6:49
- Label: Paradise Sound System
- Composers: Bonga Ntozini; Kasmario Ike Fankis; Nana Atta
- Producers: Bonga Ntozini; Kasmario Ike Fankis; Zakhele Madida

Zakes Bantwini singles chronology
"Your King" (2018)	"Osama" (2021)	"Mama Thula" (2023)

Kasango singles chronology
"One Night" (2019)	"Osama" (2021)	"Dance For Me" (2023)

"Osama" is a song by South African singer Zakes Bantwini and Kasango, released on September 10, 2021, as a lead single from Bantwini's third studio album Ghetto King. It was produced by Bonga Ntozini, Kasmario Ike Fankis, and Zakhele Madida.

The song debuted number one in South Africa, where it remained for ten weeks. An official music video for "Osama" was released on December 31, 2021, directed by Darion 4K. Within 10 month's of its release, the song was certified 4× platinum in South Africa with more than 120 000 thousand units sold.

== Background ==
Zake's teased "Osama" on his mix playlist at Kunye event, release date was announced via his Twitter account which was set to be released on September 21, 2021. Due to high demand from fans the song was rescheduled to September 10.

== Commercial performance ==
The song was certified 4× platinum in South Africa.

== Composition ==
"Osama" was written by Zakhele Madida, Bonga Ntozini, Nana Atta, and Kasmario Ike Fankis. The song's lyrics discuss protection, wisdom, strength, power and are sung in Glossolalia.

"It is a prayer to someone, it is a spiritual thing to someone, to someone [else] it might be a love song. It's whatever you interpret it to be"; said Zakes Bantwini

— Nikita Coetzee, News24,

== Music video ==
"Osama" music was released on December 31, 2021. The music video was directed by Darion 4K. The videos production team includes Focalistic, Riky Rick, Aubrey Qwana and Manu Worldstar.

The video features South African actor John Kani appears in a brief voice on song's introduction. As of February 2022, the music video has received over 1 million views on YouTube.

== Awards ==
"Osama" was nominated for Favourite Song at the 2022 DStv Mzansi Viewers Choice Awards. The song won Best Collaboration and SAMRO Highest Airplay Award at the 28th South African Music Awards.

Year	Nominee / work	Award	Result
2022	"Osama"	Favourite Song	Nominated
2022	"Osama"	Best Collaboration	Won
2022	"Osama"	Highest Airplay	Won

== Charts ==
Weekly chart performance for "Osama"
Chart (2021)	Peak position
South Africa (EMA)	1

== Certification and sales ==
Region	Certification	Certified units/Sales
South Africa (RiSA)	4× Platinum	120 000+

== Personnel ==
"Osama" credits adapted from AllMusic.

- Nana Atta - composer
- Zakhele Madida - composer, producer
- Kasango - primary artist
- Bonga Ntozini - composer, producer
- Kasmario Ike Fankis - composer, producer
