= Ugcobo =

Studio album by Nomfundo Moh
- Released: May 26, 2023
- Length: 54:00
- Label: Universal Music

Nomfundo Moh chronology
| Amagama (2022) | Ugcobo (2023) | Twenty Four (2024) |

Ugcobo is the second studio album by South African singer and songwriter Nomfundo Moh, released on May 26, 2023 through Universal Music.

Moh explores themes of love, healing, and growth.

== Background ==
Moh announced her second studio album Ugcobo and its lead single "Amalobolo" featuring Big Zulu in March 2023.

== Commercial performance ==
Ugcobo became her first album to amass 1 million streams less than a week of its release.

=== Accolades ===
Ugcobo received nomination for Album of the Year at Africa Entertainment Awards. It was also nominated for Afrimma Album of the Year at 2023 African Muzik Magazine Awards. In addition the album also received nomination for African Pop Album at 2024 Metro FM Music Awards. At the 30th ceremony of South African Music Awards, the album received a nomination for Best Afro Pop Album.

| Year | Nominee / work | Award | Result | Ref. |
|---|---|---|---|---|
| 2023 | Ugcobo | Album of the Year | Nominated | |
| 2023 | Ugcobo | Afrimma Album of the Year | Nominated | |
| 2024 | Ugcobo | Best African Pop | Nominated | |
| 2024 | Ugcobo | Best Afro Pop Album | Nominated | |

== Critical reception ==
=== Year-end lists ===
Select year-end rankings of Ugcobo
| Critic/Publication | List | Rank | Ref. |
|---|---|---|---|
| African Folder | 10 Best African Albums | 1 | |

== Track listing ==
Standard Edition
| No. | Title | Length |
|---|---|---|
| 1. | "Noyana (Intro)" (Bongani Sax) | 3:03 |
| 2. | "Uthando Lunye" | 4:14 |
| 3. | "Umjolo O Healthy" (Afrotraction) | 3:59 |
| 4. | "Isithombe" | 4:14 |
| 5. | "Nanini" (Simmy) | 4:13 |
| 6. | "Amalobolo" (Big Zulu) | 4:20 |
| 7. | "Umncele" | 3:04 |
| 8. | "Ndaba Zabantu" | 4:17 |
| 9. | "Muntu Wesemzini" | 4:36 |
| 10. | "Ilifa" | 3:51 |
| 11. | "Wamqoma Kanjani" (Ntencane) | 4:11 |
| 12. | "Moya Wami" (Naxion Cross) | 4:06 |
| 13. | "Ingoma" | 3:24 |
| 14. | "Ugcobo The Anointing (Outro)" | 2:38 |
| Total length: | | 54:00 |

== Personnel ==
Credits are adapted from AllMusic.

- Afro'traction - Primary Artist
- Naxion Cross - Primary Artist, Producer
- Eddy Khumalo - Composer, Producer
- Celimpilo Manyathi - Composer, Producer
- Nomfundo Moh - Composer, Primary Artist
- Mzwandile Moya - Composer
- Ntencane - Primary Artist
- Bongane Sax - Primary Artist, Saxophone
- Simmy - Primary Artist
- Martin Manqoba Sosibo - Composer
- Jaiva Zimnike - Primary Artist
- Senzo Zondi - Composer
- Big Zulu - Primary Artist, Rap
- Sphesihle Zulu - Primary Artist

== Release history ==
| Region | Date | Format | Version | Label | Ref. |
|---|---|---|---|---|---|
| South Africa | May 26, 2023 | Digital download, streaming | Standard | Universal | |
