= Afro tech =

Subgenre of Afro house

- Other names: Afro-tech; AfroTech
- Stylistic origins: Afro house; techno
- Cultural origins: 2010s, South Africa
- Typical instruments: Vocals; piano; drums; synthesiser; sequencers

Other topics
- Afro fusion; tech house; Shangaan electro

Afro tech (also Afro-tech or AfroTech) is a sub-genre of afro house which originates and is predominantly made in South Africa. It emerged in the 2010s. South African DJs and music producers who popularized the genre include Black Coffee, Culoe De Song, Bekzin Terris, Euphonik ( DJ Themba), Punk Mbedzi, DJ Tira, Zakes Bantwini, Shimza and Da Capo.

== Name and characteristics ==
The name is in direct symmetry with Afro house whereas in frame of reference the prefix 'afro' defines anything relating to African culture as well as Africa. The suffix 'tech' appeared to be designated on account of the evident immediate connection to techno.

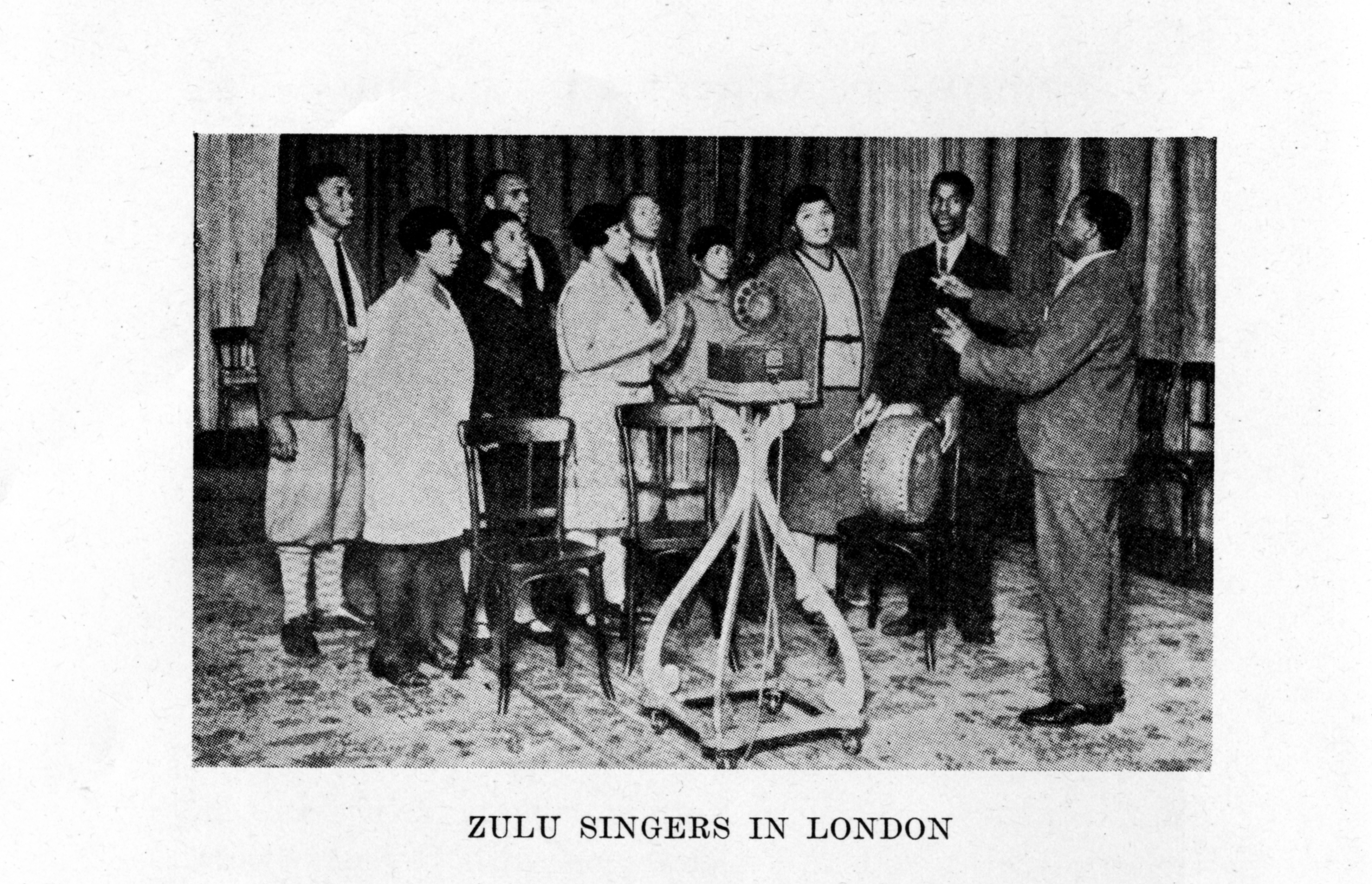
"Zulu singers in London"

Vocals or lyrics are predominantly delivered in Xhosa and Zulu.

Afro-tech is a combination of Afro house and techno sounds inclusive of various African percussion.

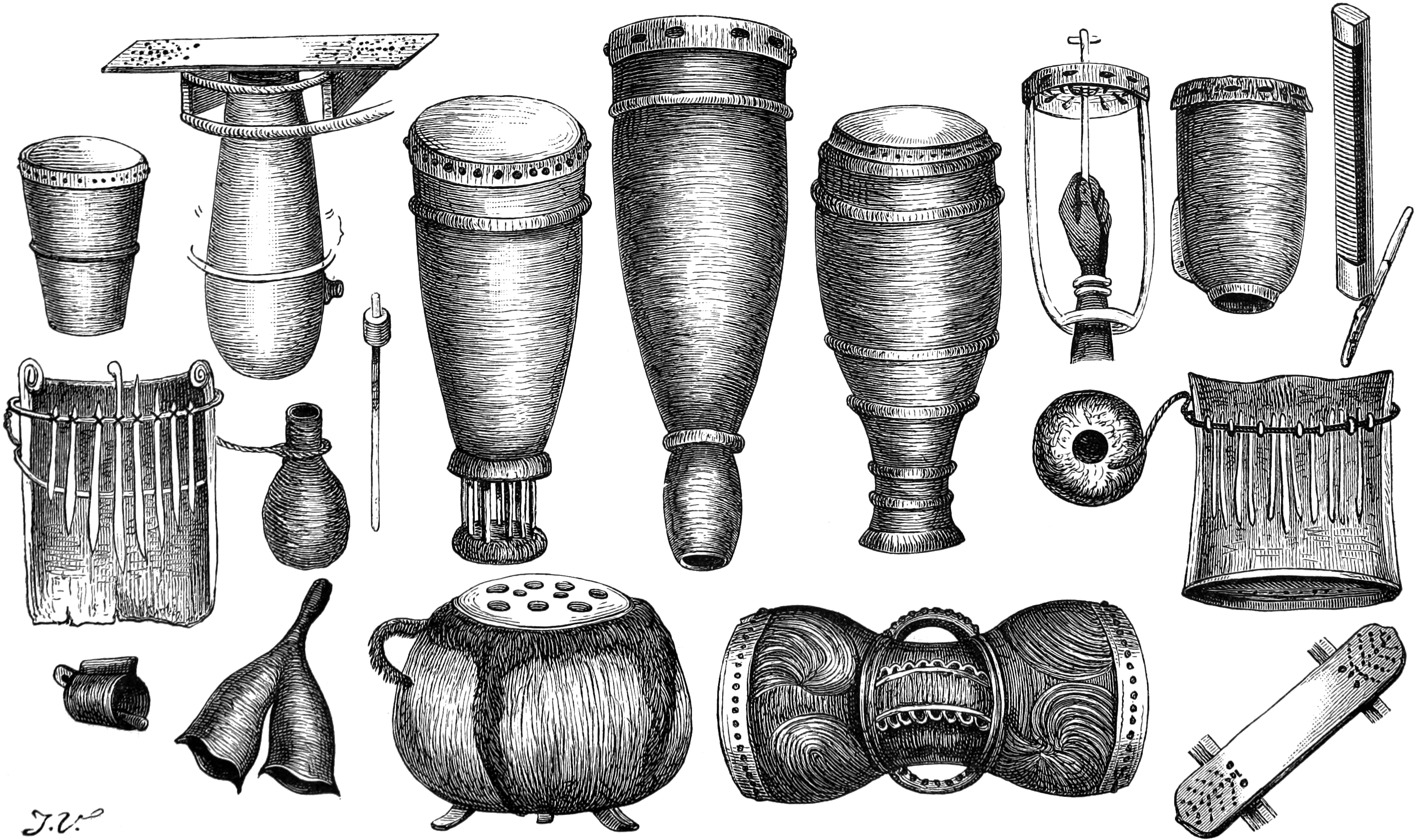
Traditional African instruments of the Marutse-Mabunda kingdom, 1881.

== History ==
The genre emerged in the 2010s, when record producers started exploring a distinct sound, reminiscent of afro-house but characterized by a stronger techno influence. Presumed precursor examples, being McLloyd's "Tembisa Funk", Blackwhole's "1000 seconds", DJ Tira's Ezase Afro Vol.1 "Won't Let Go", Bekzin Terris' ',"The Calling" (Woza Madala), Punk Mbedzi's "6th Sense" as well as Black Coffee's "We Dance Again". Additionally, gqom was prevalent during the period.

But although it seemed to have appeared from some alien reality, gqom was actually a kind of feverish hardcore reimagining of kwaito, afro-house and what was known locally as 'broken beat'.

— Matthew Collin, "Rave On - Global Adventures in Electronic Dance Music", 2018

=== 2010s ===
In 2015, Grammy award-winning artist Black Coffee received the Breakthrough of the Year award at the DJ Awards, primarily due to the song "We Dance Again" featuring Nakhane.

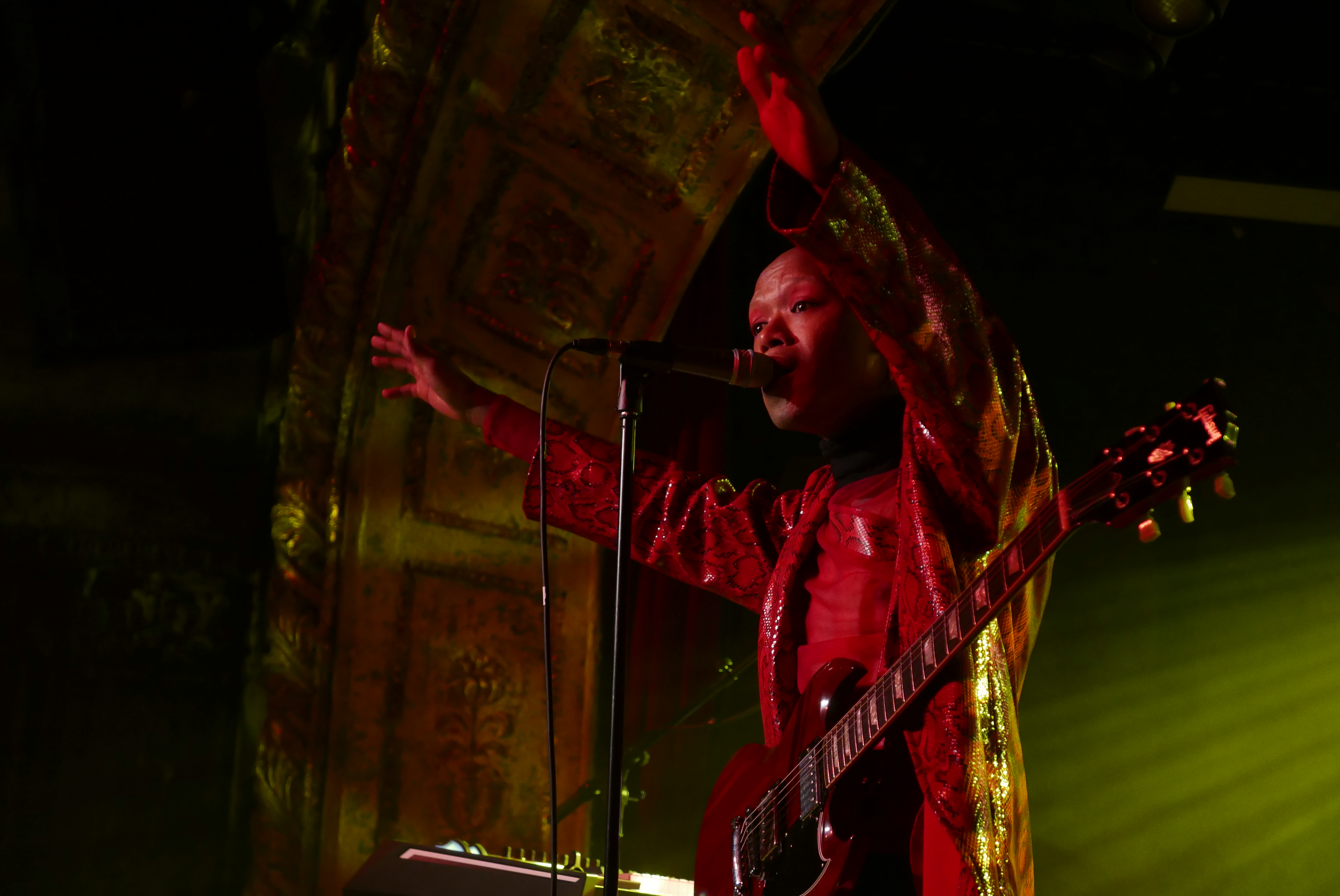
Singer, activist and songwriter, Nakhane.

In 2018, Punk Mbedzi recorded a live Afro tech mix for Redbull.

Gqom, DJ and producer, DJ Lag released a song titled, "3 Step Culo". Some of DJ Lag's work showcases the fusion of afro tech with other genres such as gqom, amapiano and Afro house.

Obviously they're hearing Black Coffee and all that Durban house sound with the drones, the reverb and the mental syncopated shakers, but they're taking away it's smoothness, Jones explains. They go "fuck it" and they strip out the vocals, take out that four-on-the-floor kick drum and start giving it that broken rhythm. Then they add that drone and that one-note repetition that goes on for about six minutes.

— Matthew Collin, "Rave On - Global Adventures in Electronic Dance Music", 2018

Euphonik changed his stage name to "DJ Themba".

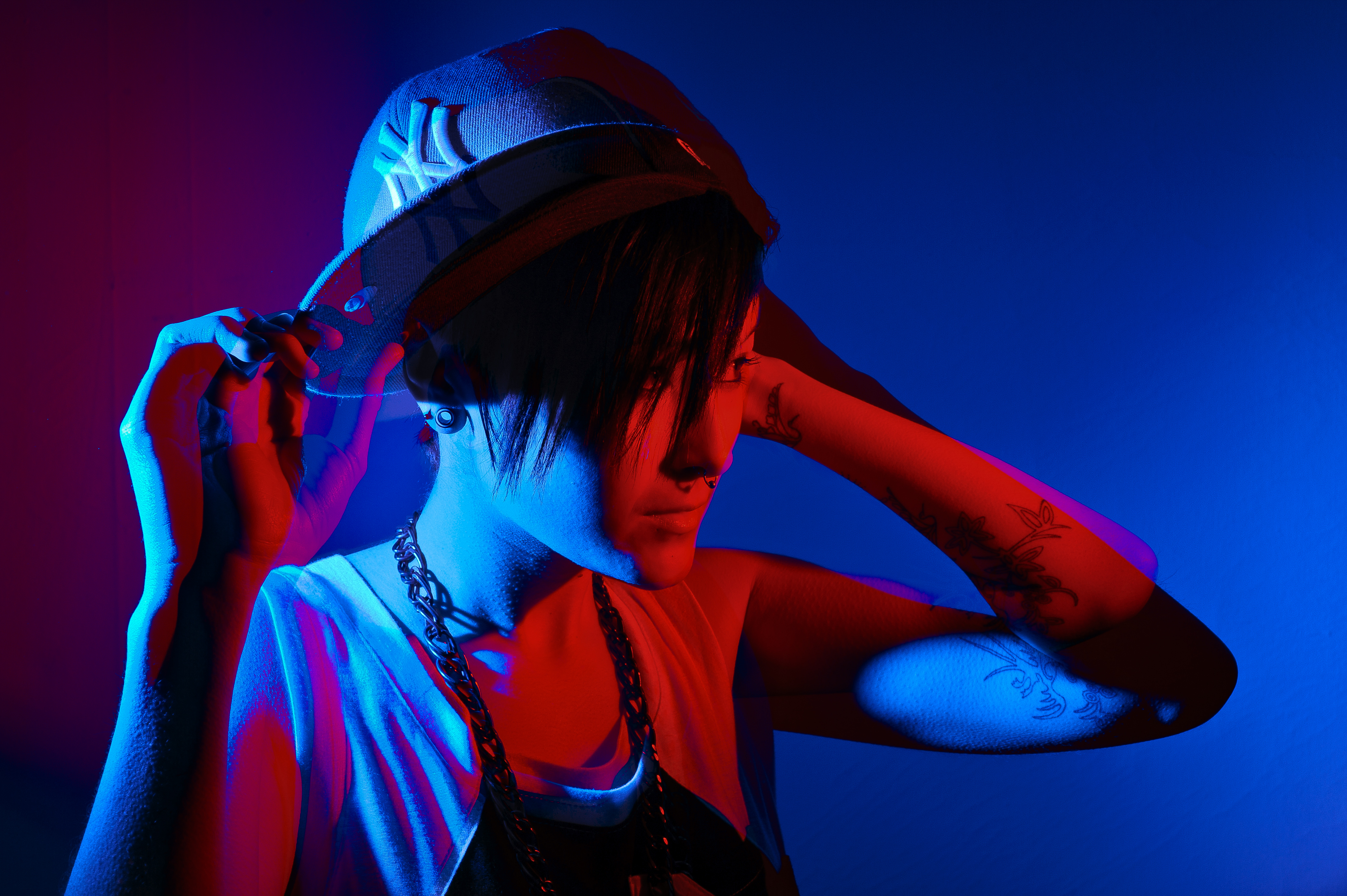
Maya Jane Coles, most famed for techno collaborated with Culoe De Song, in 2018.

Culoe De Song released the album Black which featured British-Japanese techno musician, Maya Jane Coles as well as Da Capo. The album was especially curated for the event "Black NYC" in New York City which was headlined by De Song and German, DJ Dixon.

In 2019, Holly Rey was the first woman in 20 years to win the South African Music Awards, Record of the Year, award for her single "Deeper". Holly Rey had taken over from Brenda Fassie who won the award in 1999 for "Vulindlela". In 2023, she collaborated with Kenyan musician, Blinky Bill on the song "25 To Life".

=== 2020s ===
In 2020, DJ Shimza became the first DJ, ever to play a set on Robben Island. During the apartheid regime, Nelson Mandela was imprisoned on the island for 18 years.

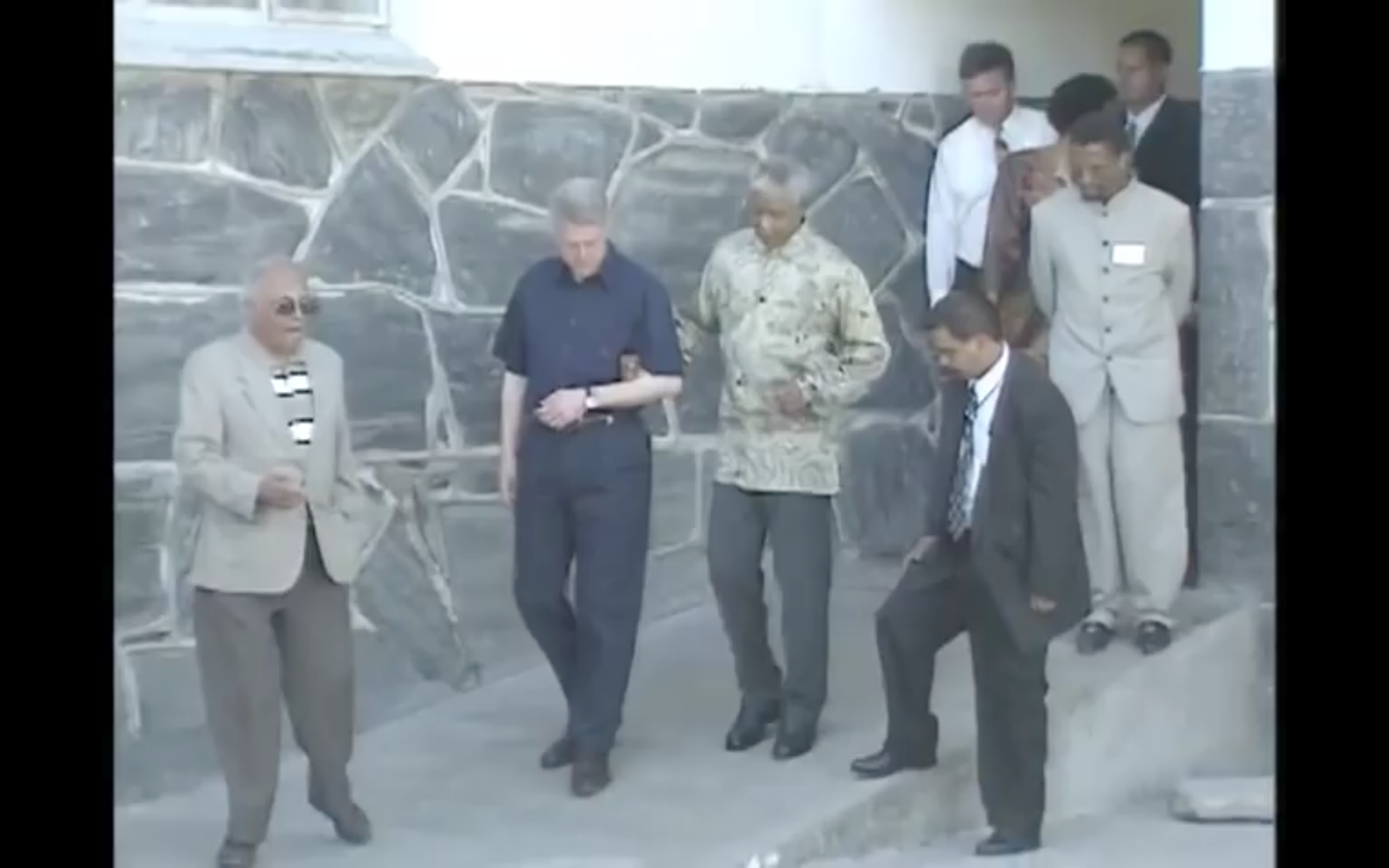
Bill Clinton on a tour of Robben Island pictured with Nelson Mandela, in 1998.

DJ Clock, NaakmusiQ and DJ Tira released "SuperHero", described as "an old techno flavour and a strong kwaito feel". The song's music video was filmed solely using the mobile phones of DJ Tira and NaakMusiQ.

In 2021, Black Coffee collaborated with the singer, Cassie on a song titled, "Time".

"IMali" was released by Zakes Bantwini, Nana Atta, and Karyendasoul. The song was certified platinum and debuted at number 1, on South African, charts.

In 2022, Caiiro and Enoo Napa performed a back to back, set for Mixmag's, In The Lab Johannesburg.

Through German electronic music record label Get Physical Music, producer, vocalist and singer Thandi Draai released a compilation album titled Africa Gets Physical Vol. 4. The compilation showcased afro-tech musicians from various African countries such as Kenya, Ghana, Zimbabwe, Nigeria and South Africa, among others. It was abundant in African percussion, vocals and rhythms. The album, comprised 17 songs and featured Thakzin, Atmos Blaq, Drega, Dawgpound and Kitty Amor.

In 2023, Spotify established the "AfroTech Now" playlist.

Karyendasoul released his debut album, We Live 4 Our Music. The album included other acclaimed afro house and afro tech artists such as songwriters and singers Ami Faku, Msaki, Simmy and Zakes Bantwini. The album was listed in DJ Mag's, top albums of 2023.

"iPlan" by gqom producer Dlala Thukzin ( known for fusing gqom with Afro tech and amapiano) debuted at number 1 on Billboard South Africa songs, and on The Official South African Charts, also surpassed 2 millions streams, and achieved double-platinum status in 2 weeks.

DJ, DESIREE was announced as the DJ Mag Top 100 DJs Future Star, winner.

Lizwi released "Prayer". The song's delivery is a Christian prayer in Zulu.

Portuguese, duo Afrokillerz released their 11 songs, debut album, "UKÄRÄ" featuring Angolan artist Irina Vasconcelos and singer, Szon.

Mörda (former Black Motion, member) and musician Brenden Praise featured on The Color Purple(soundtrack). They remixed Tamela Mann's "Mysterious Ways". The compilation included other acclaimed artists such as Alicia Keys, Mary J. Blige, Usher and Halle Bailey.

In 2024, GIMC Afro Tech 5.0 was held in Botswana. The event was established in April 2022. Previously South African Afro tech acts such as Da Capo, Africa Da Deep, Darque, Mpho.Wav, Culoe De Song, Sun El Musician, Black Motion, Lemon and Herb amongst local acts Nurogroove and Raul Bryan were showcased. Event organizer, Fish Pabalinga stipulated that "the event has positively impacted the growth of Afro Tech in the country".

American singer Aloe Blacc most noted as the songster on Avicii's, "Wake Me Up" collaborated with DJ Shimza for single "Darling" an afro-tech and soul interpretation of Ben E. King's 1961 single, "Stand By Me".

"Ode to Ancestors" by Black Coffee featured Benin actor Djimon Hounsou as presumed guest performance vocalist on Rebel Moon –Songs Of The Rebellion which was compiled for and inspired by Zack Snyder's Netflix sci-fi, space opera film series, Rebel Moon-Part 2. The extended play included other artists such as Tokimonsta and aespa. "Ode to Ancestors" was specifically inspired by the character, General Titus played by Hounsou.

Emerging from a two-year hiatus, the Cape Town electronic music trio GoodLuck debuted their inaugural Afro tech-inspired collaboration with Frigid Armadillo on the song "Goodbye My Friend".

== Noteworthy record labels ==
- Soul Candi
