= Phakade Lami =

Single by Nomfundo Moh featuring Ami Faku and Sha Sha

from the album Amagama
- Released: October 11, 2021
- Recorded: 2020–2021
- Label: Universal Music South Africa
- Producers: Celimpilo Manyathi; Martin Manqoba Sosibo; Charmaine Mapimbiro

Nomfundo Moh singles chronology
"Lilizela" (2021)	"Phakade Lami" (2021)	"Amalobolo" (2023)

Ami Faku singles chronology
"Imali" (2020)	"Phakade Lami" (2021)

Sha Sha singles chronology
"Woza" (2020)	"Phakade Lami" (2021)

"Phakade Lami" is a single by South African singer Nomfundo Moh featuring Zimbabwean-born Sha Sha and South African singer Ami Faku, released on October 11, 2021, by Universal, as album's third single from her debut studio album Amagama (2022). It was produced by Celimpilo Manyathi, Martin Manqoba Sosibo, Charmaine Mapimbiro.

The song was certified 6× platinum in South Africa.

== Background ==
She revealed release date via her Twitter account on October 8, 2021.

== Commercial performance ==
Upon its release the song garnered over 3 000 000 streams on Spotify.

"Phakade Lami" was certified 6× platinum in South Africa.

== Charts ==
Chart performance for "Phakade Lami"
Chart (2022)	Peak position
South Africa Streaming (TOSAC)	5

== Certifications ==
Region	Certification	Certified units/sales
South Africa (RISA)	6× Platinum	120,000^{‡}
^{‡} Sales+streaming figures based on certification alone.

== Personnel ==
All credits adapted from AllMusic.

- Amanda Faku - Composer
- Ami Faku - Featured Artist, Primary Artist
- Celimpilo Manyathi - Producer
- Charmaine Mapimbiro - Composer, Producer
- Nomfundo Moh - Composer, Primary Artist
- Sha Sha - Featured Artist, Primary Artist
- Martin Manqoba Sosibo - Producer

== Accolades ==
"Phakade Lami" received several nominations at 28th South African Music Awards was nominated for Record of the Year, Music Video of the Year, and TikTok Viral Song of the Year. At the 2022 Basadi in Music Awards received a nomination for Song of the Year.

Year	Nominee / work	Award	Result	Ref.
2022	"Phakade Lami"	Record of the Year	Nominated	
2022	"Phakade Lami"	Music Video of the Year	Nominated	
2022	"Phakade Lami"	TikTok Viral Song of the Year	Nominated	
2022	"Phakade Lami"	Song of the Year	Nominated	
2022	"Phakade Lami"	Best Artist, Duo or Group in African RnB & Soul	Nominated	
