= Mobi Dixon =

South African DJ and music producer

- Born: Mabi Ntuli
- Occupations: DJ; music producer
- Years active: 2008–present
- Label: Sony

Mabi Ntuli, professionally known as Mobi Dixon is a South African DJ and music producer.

Dixon's debut studio album Tribal Soul (2014), which became certified platinum by the Recording Industry of South Africa (RiSA). Its lead single "City Rains", debuted number three in South Africa.

== Career ==
His musical career began while attending school producing beats for South African hip hop artist in late 1990s. After matric he obtained Sound Engineering diploma at Selborne College and Information Technology diploma at Damelin College, East London. In 2007, Ntuli established recording label, and began recording his Extended Play Dance is Kulcha. The EP was released vinyl and digital in 2007. In 2008, Dixon was a contestant on DJU/AXE remix competition and won it.

In 2012, Dixon produced Dinaledi album by DJ Vetkuk and Mahoota.

On July 11, 2014, his single "City Rains" featuring Mque was released. The song peaked number at number 3 on Entertainment Monitoring Africa top 100 RAMS charts. His debut studio album Tribal Soul was released in October 2014. The album debuted at number one on iTunes and was certified platinum by the Recording Industry of South Africa (RiSA). To further promote his album, he embarked on City Rains Tour in August 2015. In early 2016, he signed a record deal with Sony Entertainment Africa and House Afrika Records.

His single "Trigger" featuring Inga Hina was released as album's lead single on June 24, 2016. The song was certified platinum by the Recording Industry of South Africa. In the third quarter of 2016, his single "Ezizweni" featuring Zimbabwean-born singer Berita was released and as well accompanying music video. The song debuted number 2 on Entertainment Monitoring Africa top 100 RAM charts. On September 2, 2016, his second studio album Live the Music was released in South Africa. Live the Music was certified gold and won Best Dance Album at 2017 Metro FM Awards. On September 1, 2017, Dixion single "Bhutiza" featuring South African singer Nichume was released.

On August 24, 2018, his album 10 Steps Forward was released. At the 25th ceremony of South African Music Awards, 10 Steps Forward was nominated for Best Dance Album. On October 17, 2019, Dixon single "Kobanini" featuring South African singer Nomcebo Zikode and co-producer T-Love was released. In early November 2021, his single "When House Was a House" featuring Mariechan and JNR was released. The song entered Top 50 at number 38 on Local Music Radio Charts.

On November 19, 2021, his eighth studio album When House Was a House was released.

In early August 2022, Dixon embarked on 2 Leg Mobi Tek Tour started off at Nirobi, Kenya promoting fourth studio album Mobi Tek.

"Banike" featuring South African group Mafikizolo was released on September 13, 2022, as album's lead single.

The album was released on September 30, 2022.

Mobi released his extended play Sacred Steps, on August 30, 2024. Sacred Steps is an afro-house record incorporated with 3 steps genre.

== Discography ==
- Tribal Soul (2014)
- Live the Music (2017)
- 10 Steps Forward (2018)
- The Chapel (2020)
- When House Was a House (2021)
- Mobi Tek (2022)
- Sacred Steps (2024)

== Personal life ==
Ntuli is married to Palesa Rashama in April 2017.

== Awards ==
=== Metro FM Awards ===
Year	Nominee / work	Award	Result	Ref.
2017	Live the Music	Best Dance Album	Won	

=== South African Music Awards ===
Year	Nominee / work	Award	Result	Ref.
2017	Live The Music	Best Dance Album	Won	
2019	10 Steps Forward	Best Dance Album	Nominated	
2022	When House Was House	Album of the Year	Nominated	
2022	When House Was House	Male Artist of the Year	Nominated	
2022	When House Was House	Best Dance Album	Nominated	
2022	"When House was House" ft. Mariechan and Jnr SA	Best produced Music Video	Won	
