= Kususa =

South African electronic duo

- Origin: Durban, South Africa
- Genres: House; EDM; techno; afro house
- Years active: 2016–present
- Label: Back Noise Music Africa
- Members: Joshua Sokweba; Mncedi Tshicila

Kususa is an electronic dance music DJ and production duo originating from Durban, South Africa, consisting of Joshua Sokweba, known as Kunzima Theology, and Mncedi Tshicila, known as Samurai Yasusa. They create electronic dance music containing elements of house, afro house and techno. The duo's name Kususa is both a combination of the pair's stage names and a word which, when roughly translated into the Zimbabwean language of Shona, means "to start over".

== History ==
Kususa started producing and DJing together in 2016 when they worked on their debut EP titled Kusuka Sukela, which was later released in 2017 by the United Kingdom record label, DM Recordings. In early 2017, they released a remix for the single Traveller by South African singer Lizwi and producer DeMajor, which was nominated in the 2017 Dance Music Awards South Africa, for Remix of the Year and was also featured on Black Coffee’s Ibiza 17 Appreciation Mix and later in 2018 featured on Defected Records's Ibiza 2018 Compilation mixed by Sam Divine. In that same year, their remix Feel It Now by Cornelius SA, featuring singer Jackie Queens, was nominated in the 2018 South Africa Music Awards, for Remix of the Year. The duo was also nominated for Best producer.

In early 2019, the duo performed at the Cape Town Electronic Music Festival which took place at the Castle of Good Hope. Later that year they performed at Ultra South Africa alongside Black Coffee.

== Members ==
- Joshua Sokweba
- Mncedi Tshicila

== Awards and nominations ==
| Year | Award ceremony | Prize | Result | Ref. |
|---|---|---|---|---|
| 2017 | Dance Music Awards South Africa | Remix of The Year | Nominated | |
| 2018 | Dance Music Awards South Africa | Remix of The Year | Nominated | |
| 2018 | Dance Music Awards South Africa | Best Producer | Nominated | |
| 2019 | Dance Music Awards South Africa | Remix of the Year | Nominated | |
| 2019 | Dance Music Awards South Africa | Compilation of the Year | Nominated | |
| 2019 | Dance Music Awards South Africa | Best Underground Record | Nominated | |
| 2019 | Dance Music Awards South Africa | Best Producer | Nominated | |
| 2023 | Metro FM Music Awards | Best House Song | Nominated | |
| 2023 | Metro FM Music Awards | Best Collaborative Song | Nominated | |
| 2025 | South African Music Awards | Best Collaboration | Nominated | |
| 2025 | South African Music Awards | Duo or Group of The Year | Nominated | |

== Discography ==
- Kusuka Sukela (2017)
- Icilongo (2017)
- Inkinobo (2017)
- I See You EP (2018)
- Ubomi EP (2022)
- A Life Worth Living (2024)

=== Guest appearances ===
| Title | Year | Other artist(s) | Album |
|---|---|---|---|
| "Slide" | 2022 | Vanco, Bonokuhle | Motherland |

== Singles ==
=== As lead artist ===
List of singles as lead artist, with selected chart positions and certifications, showing year released and album name
| Title | Year | Peak chart positions | Certifications | Album |
| Title | Year | ZA | Certifications | Album |
|---|---|---|---|---|
| "Abantu Bakho" (featuring Naak Musiq, Zahara) | 2021 | 18 | | Ubomi |
| "Asanda" (Kususa, Argento Dust, Zakes Bantwini) | 2022 | 1 | RiSA: Platinum | Ubomi |
| "Duda" (Joezi, Kususa featuring Maline Aura) | 2023 | — | | Non-album single |
| "Uyingozi" (Funky Qla, Zaba, Kususa, Argento Dust) | 2023 | — | | Dark or Durban EP |
| "Ematshwaleni" (Kususa, Anatii featuring MaWhoo, Noxolo Ngema, King Deetoy) | 2024 | — | | Non-album single |
| "Overcome" (Naak, Kususa, Tau (BW) | 2024 | — | | Non-album single |
| "Pink Diamond Sky" (Kususa, Biishop) | 2026 | — | | Non-album single |
| "Wicked Games" (AERES, Kususa, Matroniq) | 2026 | — | | Non-album single |
"—" denotes a recording that did not chart or was not released in that territory.
