= Ghetto King =

Studio album by Zakes Bantwini
- Released: 3 December 2021
- Length: 60:19
- Label: Mayonie Production; Paradise Sound System
- Producer: Zakes Bantwini; BlaQRhythm; Da Capo; Drega; Karyendasoul; Kasango; Skillz

Zakes Bantwini chronology
Bossa Paris Nights (2018)	Ghetto King (2021)	The Star Is Reborn (2023)

Singles from Ghetto King
- 1. "Osama" Released: 10 September 2021

Ghetto King is the third studio album by South African singer Zakes Bantwini. It was released on 3 December 2021, by Mayonie Production and Paradise Sound System. BlaQRhythm, DeeTheGeneral, Drega, Karyendasoul, Khetha, Mthunzi, Nana Atta, Nomkhosi, Skillz, and Skye Wanda appear as guest artists.

== Release ==
"Osama" was released as the album's lead single on 10 September 2021. The song peaked at number one on Radio Monitor Charts.

== Critical reception ==
Magnetic Magazine wrote; "Ghetto King is a long and sometimes slow burn, but the payoffs are worth it".

== Accolades ==
Year	Nominee / work	Award	Result	Ref.
2022	Ghetto King	Best Dance Album	Nominated	
2022	Ghetto King	Album of the Year	Nominated	
2022	Ghetto King	Best Engineered Album of the Year	Nominated	
2022	Ghetto King	Male Artist of the Year	Nominated	

Ghetto King received four nominations for Best Dance Album, Best Engineered Album of the Year, Album of the Year, Male Artist of the Year at the 28th ceremony of South African Music Awards.

== Commercial performance ==
In late January 2022, Ghetto King surpassed 50 million streams.

== Track listing ==
Ghetto King track listing
No.	Title	Length
1.	"Abantu" (Zakes Bantwini, Karyendasoul featuring Nana Atta)	6:46
2.	"Girl in the Mirror" (featuring Skye Wanda)	6:57
3.	"Bawo" (featuring Amanda Black)	8:02
4.	"Uzalo" (featuring Nomkhosi and Olefied Khetha)	6:46
5.	"2am in Space"	7:15
6.	"Amanga" (Da Capo Remix; featuring Nana Atta)	8:21
7.	"Osama" (with Kasango)	6:49
8.	"Dutywa To Kwamashu" (with Drega)	7:20
9.	"Lesson" (featuring Deethegeneral)	5:30
10.	"Kumnyama" (featuring Mthunzi)	7:13
11.	"GOAT" (with Skillz)	8:15
Total length:		60:19

== Personnel ==
All credits adapted from AllMusic.

- Amanda Benedicta Anthony – vocals
- Nana Atta – vocals
- Zakhele Madida – vocals, producer
- BlaQRhythm – vocals, producer
- Nicodimus Mogashoa – producer, remix engineer
- DeeTheGeneral – vocals
- Ega – vocals, producer
- Kasmario Ike Fankis – producer
- Karyendasoul – producer, vocals
- Kasango – vocals
- Olefied Khetha – vocals
- Nomkhosi – vocals
- Skillz – producer, vocals
- Skye Wanda – vocals

== Release history ==
Release dates and formats for Ghetto King
Region	Date	Format(s)	Edition(s)	Label	Ref.
Various	3 December 2021	Digital download; streaming	Standard	Mayonie Production CC	
