= A Giant Leap =

Studio album by Culoe De Song
- Released: 24 November 2009
- Genre: Afro house, tribal house
- Length: 73:42
- Label: Universal Music Group, Soulistic Music
- Producer: Culoe De Song; Shana; Soundiata’s Rebels; Reggie Dokes

Culoe De Song chronology
A Giant Leap (2009)	Elevation (2011)

A Giant Leap is the debut studio album by South African house producer Culoe De Song. It was released on 24 November 2009 through Soulistic Music.

== Critical reception ==
Professional ratings
Review scores
Source	Rating
Resident Advisor	4.0/5 stars

Upon its release, A Giant Leap received generally positive reviews. William Rauscher of Resident Advisor praised the transitions between the songs, stating that, "As a whole, A Giant Leap takes the concept of a seamlessly-mixed LP to new heights—it's like a suite, an epic-scaled sound-world that entrances with graceful, gentle transitions between new tracks, remixes and previous EP material.

== Accolades ==
A Giant Leap earned Culoe De Song a nomination for Newcomer of the Year and the song Webaba was nominated for MTN Record of the Year, both at the 2010 South African Music Awards. At the 10th annual Metro FM Music Awards, the album gained him a nomination for Best Newcomer.

== Track listing ==
No.	Title	Producer(s)	Length
1.	"Amasiko" (featuring Shana)	De Song	11:06
2.	"Gwebindlala" (featuring Thandiswa Mazwai)	De Song	5:56
3.	"Webaba" (featuring Busi Mhlongo)	De Song	8:00
4.	"Soundiata’s Rebels (Tamboula) [Culoe De Song KaMnguni Dub]"	Soundiata’s Rebels; De Song	7:44
5.	"Reggie Dokes (Let Me Go) [Culoe De Song Zulu Spirit Mix]"	Reggie Dokes; De Song	7:13
6.	"The Neighbour" (featuring Salif Keita, Jimmy Dludlu & René McLean)	De Song	4:23
7.	"The Fallen Siren"	De Song	7:44
8.	"Super Afro"	De Song	7:42
9.	"The Dragon’s End" (featuring Fatima)	De Song	8:00
10.	"The Bright Forest"	De Song	5:55
Total length:			73:42
