= Amagama =

Studio album by Nomfundo Moh
- Released: January 28, 2022
- Recorded: 2020–2022
- Length: 47:22 (Standard Edition); 60:08 (Deluxe Edition)
- Label: Universal Music South Africa
- Producer: Martin Manqoba Sosibo

Nomfundo Moh chronology
Amagama (2022)	Ugcobo (2023)

Singles from Amagama
- 1. "Lilizela" Released: February 2021; 2. "Umthwalo" Released: June 2021; 3. "Phakade Lami" Released: 11 October 2021

Amagama is a debut studio album by South African singer and songwriter Nomfundo Moh, released on January 28, 2022, through Universal Music South Africa. It was produced by Martin Manqoba Sosibo.

The album was certified platinum in South Africa.

On August 12, 2022, Moh released a deluxe version of the album, titled Amagama (Deluxe), which includes the original album's 13 tracks along with 4 new ones. With features from Sjava, Shekhinah, and Kwesta.

== Background ==
Towards the end of 2020 Moh began working on her debut album and finished recording it in 2021.

In early January 2022, she revealed release date January 28, 2022, in an interview with Drum.

== Composition ==
The final 13-track standard edition of Amagama is an Afro-pop record.

4 bonus tracks were released on Deluxe Edition in August 2022.

== Commercial performance ==
Amagama was certified platinum in South Africa.

== Accolades ==
Amagama won Best Afro-Pop Album at the 28th South African Music Awards, received a nominations for Album of the Year both All Africa Music Awards and African Entertainment Awards USA.

Year	Nominee / work	Award	Result	Ref.
2022	Amagama	Best Afro Pop Album	Won	
2022	Amagama	Album of the Year	Nominated	
2022	Amagama	Album of the Year	Nominated	

== Track listing ==
Standard Edition
No.	Title	Length
1.	"Revelation" (featuring Magcina Kanina)	1:32
2.	"Umthwalo"	3:39
3.	"Umona"	3:58
4.	"Lilizela"	4:08
5.	"Nginjena"	4:37
6.	"Soft Life"	4:08
7.	"Phakade Lami" (featuring Ami Faku, Sha Sha)	4:21
8.	"Kuhle" (featuring De Mthuda, Da Muziqal Chef)	3:28
9.	"Ngam'khetha" (featuring Naxion Cross, Beast RSA)	4:00
10.	"Isandla Sikamama"	4:03
11.	"Jikeleza"	4:00
12.	"Shintsha" (featuring Naxion Cross, Lady K)	2:50
13.	"Amagama (Outro)"	2:38
Total length:		47:22

Deluxe Edition
No.	Title	Length
1.	"Kusengakhanya"	4:05
2.	"Sundays Are For Lovers" (featuring Sjava and Shekhinah)	4:43
3.	"Sibaningi" (featuring Kwesta)	4:02
4.	"Izibusiso"	4:14
Total length:		60:08

== Personnel ==
Credits are adapted from AllMusic.

- Nomfundo Moh - Composer, Primary Artist
- Martin Manqoba Sosibo - Producer

== Certifications ==
Region	Certification	Certified units/sales
South Africa (RISA)	Platinum	30,000^{‡}
^{‡} Sales+streaming figures based on certification alone.

== Releases and singles ==
Amagama standard edition was released digitally on January 28, 2022. The album is about 47 minutes and 22 second consisting of 13 tracks.

"Phakade Lami" featuring South African singer Ami Faku and Zimbabwean-born singer Sha Sha was released as third single on October 7, 2021. It debuted at number 1 on Metro FM Top 40 Charts and number 4 on Most Popular Radio Singles.

== Release history ==
Region	Date	Format	Version	Label	Ref.
South Africa	January 28, 2022	Digital download, Streaming	Standard	Universal	
South Africa	August 12, 2022	Digital download, Streaming	Deluxe	Universal	
