= Nomfundo Moh =

South African singer-songwriter

- Born: Nomfundo Ngcobo; 18 July 2000 (age 26); Ndwendwe, KwaZulu-Natal, South Africa
- Genres: Afro-pop
- Occupation: Singer-songwriter
- Instrument: Vocals
- Years active: 2021–present
- Label: Universal Music

Nomfundo Ngcobo (born 18 July 2000), known professionally as Nomfundoh Moh is a South African singer. Born and raised in Ndwendwe, KwaZulu-Natal, her career began at the age of 16 in 2016. Moh first gained recognition after releasing "Lilizela" in 2021, which received platinum certification in South Africa.

Having signed a record deal with Universal Music, she rose to prominence with her debut studio album Amagama (2022), reached Platinum by Recording Industry of South Africa (RiSA). It was preceded by commercially successful singles "Phakade Lami", "Lilizela", "Umthwalo".

== Career ==
She studied at Intaphuka Primary School and enrolled at the University of KwaZulu-Natal a Bachelor of Social Work Degree.

Her early musical career began towards the end of 2010, as a feature artist.

=== 2020-2022: Amagama ===
In September 2020, she began working on her debut studio album. In 2020, she signed a record deal with Universal Music South Africa. In February 2021, her breakthrough single "Lilizela" was released as album's lead single. The song was certified Platinum in South Africa.

In June 2021, album's second single "Umthwalo" was released. On October 7, 2021, her third single "Phakade Lami" featuring South African singer Ami Faku and Zimbabwean-born singer Sha Sha was released. It debuted at number 1 on Metro FM Top 40 Charts and number 4 on Most Popular Radio Singles. In addition, "Phakade Lami" entered Top 10 at number 7 on Local Streaming Charts. The song was certified 6× platinum in South Africa.

On January 28, 2022, her debut studio album Amagama was released. The album incorporated elements of Rnb, Traditional pop, and hip hop. Amagama peaked at number 7 on Spotify album's charts. In early March 2022, Moh was featured by Apple Music on Africa Rising programme. On April 13, she was named as the ambassador Equal Africa Ambassador by Spotify. In May 2022, she was featured on Shay’na nge White Star campaign, which includes two dates. The first show was held at Johannesburg on 12 May, and last one in Durban on 21 May.

=== 2023-2025: Ugcobo, Twenty Four ===
In March 2023, Moh announced her second studio album Ugcobo and its lead single "Amalobolo" featuring Big Zulu. The song was released on March 10, 2023. "Uthando Lunye" was announced as second single on April 25, 2023, via her Instagram account, released on April 28, 2023. Ugcobo was released on May 26, 2023. It became her first album to amassed 1 million streams less than a week of its release.

Towards the end of May 2024, Nomfundo Moh announced her third studio album Twenty Four.

Albums pre-add were made available on July 5, 2024. The album was released on August 2, 2024.

=== 2026-present: Farm Julia ===
Towards the end of February 2026, Moh released her single "Uzophumelela" as album's lead single and announcedfourth studio album Farm Julia. The album was released on April 3, 2026.

== Business Ventures ==
In May 2024, Moh opened her restaurant La Mar in Spruitview Shopping Centre, Ekurhuleni.

== Artistry ==
Moh cites Brenda Fassie, Ami Faku, Simmy, and Amanda Black as her major influences.

== Discography ==
=== Studio albums ===
List of studio albums and certifications
Title	Details	Certifications
Amagama	Released: 28 January 2022; Label: Universal South Africa; Formats: Digital download, streaming	RISA: Platinum
Ugcobo	Released: 26 May 2023; Label: Universal South Africa; Formats: Digital download, streaming	
Farm Julia	Released: 3 April 2026; Label: Sony Africa, Moh Familia; Formats: Digital download, streaming	

== EPs ==
List of studio albums and certifications
Title	Details	Certifications
Out The Box	Released: 26 September 2025; Label: Universal South Africa; Formats: Digital download, streaming	

=== Singles ===
==== As lead artist ====
List of singles as lead artist, with selected chart positions and certifications, showing year released and album name
Title	Year	Peak chart positions	Certifications	Album
Title	Year	SA	Certifications	Album
"Lilizela"	2021	—	RISA: Platinum	Amagama
"Umthwalo"	2021	—	RISA: Gold	Amagama
"Phakade Lami" (featuring Sha Sha and Ami Faku)	2021	5	RISA: 6× Platinum	Amagama
"Amalobolo"(featuring Big Zulu)	2023	—		Ugcobo
"Uthando Lunye"	2023	—		Ugcobo
"Uyangijabulisa" (with Fezeka Dlamini and Naledi)	2023	16		Non-album single
"Umusa"(featuring Msaki and Cassper Nyovest)	2024	—		Twenty Four
"Muntu Wami" (featuring Zuko SA)	2024	—		Twenty Four
"—" denotes a recording that did not chart or was not released in that territory.

==== As featured artist ====
List of singles as featured artist, with selected chart positions and certifications, showing year released and album name
Title	Year	Peak chart positions	Certifications	Album
Title	Year	ZA	Certifications	Album
"Lu Strong" (Nontokozo Mkhize featuring Nomfundo Moh)	2023	—		Non-album single
"Awung'Fanele" (featuring Nomfundo Moh, Deep Ink, Khani)	2023	—	RiSA: Gold	Elevation
"Myekele Ahambe" (Mduduzi Ncube featuring Nomfundo Moh)	2024	—		Non-album single
"Push Push" (featuring Nomfundo Moh, Leverage, Bobo Jay Nzima, Starr Healer & Thando Zide)	2024	—		Non-album single
"—" denotes a recording that did not chart or was not released in that territory.

== Other charted and certified songs ==
List of other charted songs, with selected chart positions and certifications, showing year released and album name
Title	Year	Peak chart positions	Certifications	Album
Title	Year	ZA	Certifications	Album
"Ngam'khetha" (featuring Naxion Cross and Beast RSA)	2022	68	RISA: Platinum	Amagama
"Soft Life"	2022	3	RISA: 3× Platinum	Amagama
"Kuhle" (featuring De Mthuda and Da Muziqal Chef)	2022	—	RISA: Gold	Amagama
"Izibusiso"	2022	69	RISA: Gold	Amagama
"Sibaningi" (featuring Kwesta)	2022	54	RISA: Gold	Amagama

== Achievements ==
=== All Africa Music Awards ===
Year	Nominee / work	Award	Result	Ref.
2022	Amagama	Album of the Year	Nominated	
2022	"Phakade Lami"	Best Artist, Duo or Group in African RnB & Soul	Nominated	
2022	"Phakade Lami"	Best Female Artiste Southern Africa	Nominated	
2022	Herself	Breakout Artist of the Year	Nominated	

=== Africa Entertainment Awards ===
Year	Nominee / work	Award	Result	Ref.
2023	Ugcobo	Album of the Year	Nominated	

=== Basadi in Music Awards ===
Year	Nominee / work	Award	Result	Ref.
2022	Herself	Artist of the Year	Nominated	
2022	Herself	Kaya959 Afropop Artist of the Year	Nominated	
2022	"Phakade Lami"	Song of the Year	Nominated	
2023	"Izibusiso"	Afro-pop Artist of the Year	Nominated	
2023	"Soft Life"	Highest AirPlay Song	Won	
2024	"Uyangijabulisa"	Collaboration of the Year	Nominated	

=== Gagasi FM Shero Awards ===
Year	Nominee / work	Award	Result	Ref.
2022	Herself	Entertainment and Music	Won	

=== Metro FM Music Awards ===
Year	Nominee / work	Award	Result	Ref.
2023	"Izibusiso"	Artist of the Year	Nominated	
2023	"Izibusiso"	Female Artist of the Year	Nominated	
2025	"Umusa"	Best African Pop Song	Pending	

=== South African Music Awards ===
Year	Nominee / work	Award	Result	Ref.
2022	"Phakade Lami"	Music Video of the Year	Nominated	
2022	"Phakade Lami"	Record of the Year	Nominated	
2022	Amagama	Best Afro Pop Album	Won	
2023	"Soft Life"	Record of the Year	Nominated	
2025	Twenty Four	Best Afro Pop Album	Nominated	

=== South African Afro Music Awards ===
Year	Nominee / work	Award	Result	Ref.
2024	Herself	Best Female Afro Current And Future Legend	Pending	
