= Euphonik =

South African DJ and music producer

Themba
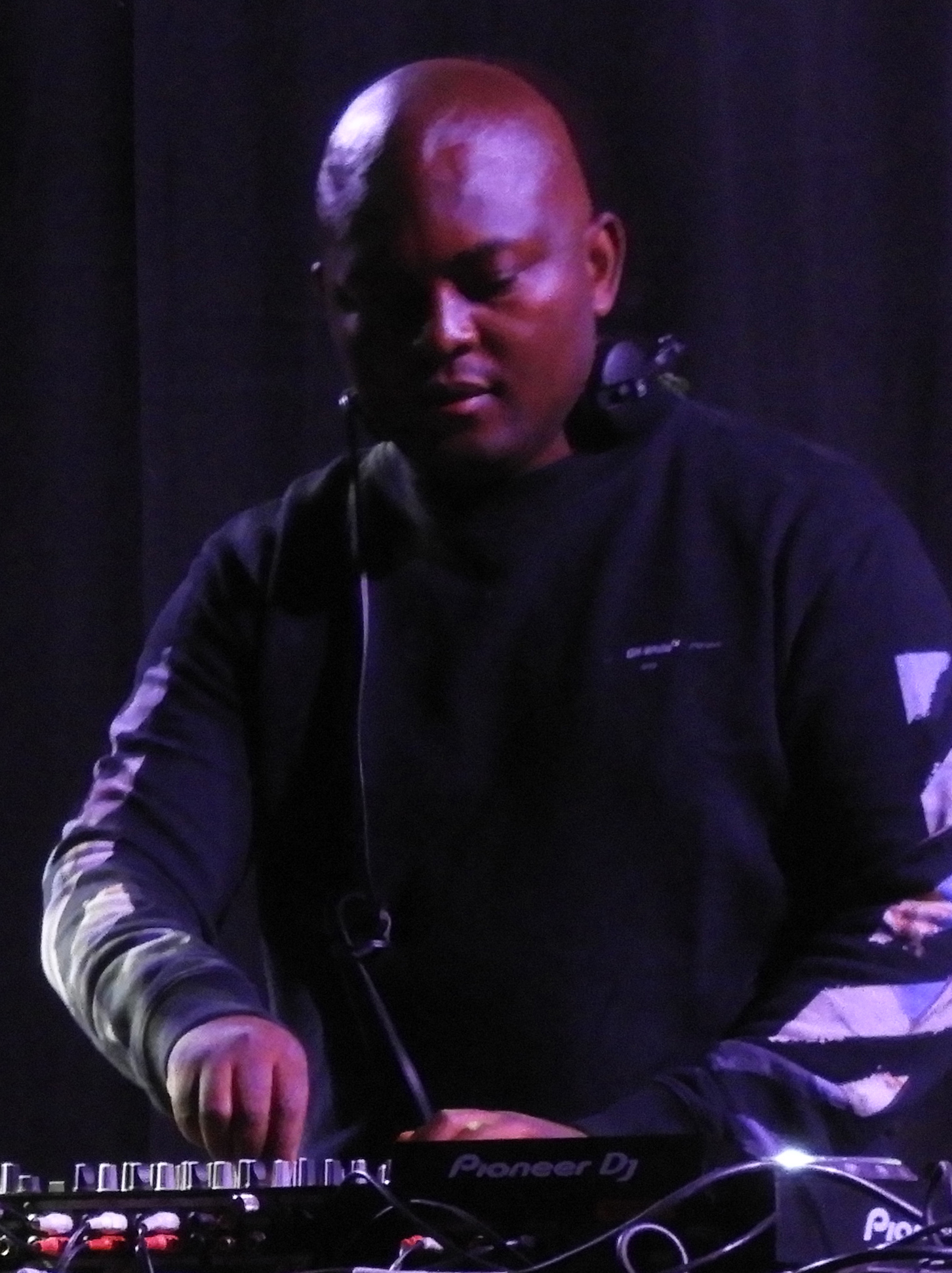
- Themba performing at WOMADelaide 2020

Background information
- Also known as: Euphonik, Themba
- Born: Themba Mbongeni Nkosi; 6 December 1983 (age 42); Mpumalanga, Emagogeni, South Africa
- Genres: House; EDM; afro tech
- Occupations: Music producer; DJ; radio presenter
- Years active: 2004–present
- Labels: euNITE / Euphonik Productions; Soul Candi Records; Armada Music
- Website: euphonik.dj

Themba Mbongeni Nkosi (born 6 December 1983), also known as Euphonik, is a South African DJ and music producer. He is known mostly for playing house music under the alias Euphonik.

== Early life ==
Nkosi was born in Mpumalanga, South Africa on 6 December 1983. He spent his childhood in Likazi, later moving to Klerksdorp, and then Benoni. His early love of music was fuelled by artists his father listened to – the likes of The Spinners, Marvin Gaye, Stimela, and Hugh Masekela. He started DJing during his late teens and quickly established himself in the club music scene. It wasn't long before his mixes achieved radio play, initially on regional station YFM. He was then offered the opportunity to host his own shows on national radio station 5FM.

== Musical career ==
=== Euphonik (2003–2016) ===
Euphonik first started remixing in 2003 and gained recognition in 2004 when he and South African DJ, DJ Kent joined forces and produced an album together, Kentphonik.

In 2004, Euphonik started his radio career on YFM, a regional radio station in South Africa, doing mixes on radio shows. He was signed by record label Soul Candi Records in 2006.

He was at YFM until 2006, when he moved to 5FM, where he had two weekly shows. His Saturday show, Ultimix Weekend Edition, featured new music and mixes from DJs across South Africa and international borders. The three-hour show (18:00 – 22:00) was the brainchild from one of 5FM's most popular features, the Ultimix @6, which can be heard from Monday to Friday on the Roger Goode show. The show involves 30-minute mixes and is used as a platform to showcase DJ talent of some of the world's leading dance artists and musos. The Saturday night show was discontinued in 2014. His Sunday show, My House, is a show dedicated to the latest and most popular house tunes from around the world.

Euphonik has travelled the world and has played in places such as New York, Miami, Ibiza, Dubai, UK, Spain, and around Africa. He has shared stages with Tiesto, Swedish House Mafia, Avicii, Afrojack, Hardwell, Skrillex, Nicky Romero, Deadmau5, Louie Vega, and Richie Hawtin.

In 2009, Euphonik and longtime friend DJ Fresh formed a brand together, called F.Eu. Since 2009, they have recorded a total of four albums together. The duo travel to Ibiza and Miami on a yearly basis to play at events such as the South African Miami Invasion and Ultra Fest Miami. In 2014 and 2015, they headlined Ultra Fest South Africa and also captained the "Oh Ship" party cruise from Durban, South Africa to the Portuguese Island.

In 2013, Euphonik's song with South African DJ Fresh and Nyanda, "Cool and Deadly", rose to number one on the 5FM Top 40.

Since 2006, he has had a weekly radio show on the South African national radio station 5FM, My House, which airs on Sunday evenings.

He has been nominated for a number of accolades at the South African Music Awards and the Metro FM Music Awards. In 2014, he won his first award – a Metro FM award for Best Compilation Album for his album, For The Love of House Volume 5. He was nominated at the 2014 South African Music Awards for Remix of the Year for his song "Hallelujah Anyway". In 2015, he received two nominations at the Metro FM Music Awards for Best Compilation Album for his album, For The Love of House Volume 6, as well as for Song of The Year for "Busa".

=== Themba (2017–present) ===
In 2017, Euphonik began performing under his first name "Themba", combining techno and house music in his DJ sets and productions. Since adopting his first name as his stage name, he has worked with a range of South African singers, songwriters and percussionists to produce original techno and house tracks. His music has been released on various record labels, including Hot Since '82's Knee Deep in Sound and Yoshitoshi. He has performed alongside Black Coffee in South Africa and Ibiza and played at Ultra Music Festival in 2018. He was nominated for Best Newcomer 2018 and Best Breakthrough 2019 at the Ibiza DJ Awards. He supported Faithless on their South African tour and performed the closing set at Womadelaide in South Australia in 2020.

== Other projects ==
Euphonik invests in properties and owns a total of fourteen properties in Johannesburg, South Africa.

He and Superga (an Italian shoe company) collaborated in 2012 and brought out a limited edition black and gold Euphonik sneaker. In 2013 they worked together on a second pair of black and gold high-top Euphonik Superga sneakers, and were expected to launch a new pair in 2015.

His name was included in The Mail & Guardian's 300 Young South Africans list.

== Mentoring ==
Euphonik put together an annual one-day workshop called DJ-101. The workshop was used to share his knowledge about the music and DJ industry with those who aspire to have a career in the industry. He also ran a one-year Mentorship Programme, Phuture DJs, where he took two upcoming DJs from around the country and taught them the ins and outs of the DJ world. At the conclusion of the Mentorship Programme, the two DJs and Euphonik produced a CD together for local release and national promotion. He is an ambassador for the Bridges For Music charity in South Africa and mentors young South African electronic musicians and DJs in their creative development.

== Discography ==
=== Studio albums ===
- For the Love of House Volume 1
- For the Love of House Volume 2
- For the Love of House Volume 3
- For the Love of House Volume 4
- For the Love of House Volume 5
- For the Love of House Volume 6

=== Mix albums ===
- Soul Candi Sessions 3 (with Kentphonik)
- Soul Candi Sessions 4
- Soul Candi Sessions 5
- Electro Candi Vol. 1
- Electro Candi Vol. 2
- Soul Candi 10th Anniversary: The Future
- For the DJs Volume 1
- For the DJs Volume 2
- For the DJs Volume 3
- Euphonik Presents Phuture DJs
- F.EU in the Club (with DJ Fresh)
- F.EU in the Studio (with DJ Fresh)
- Euphonik presents DJ Essentials Volume 1
- Euphonik presents DJ Essentials Volume 2
