= Zakes Bantwini =

South African singer, record producer and businessman

- Born: Zakhele Madida; 26 May 1981 (age 45); KwaMashu, KwaZulu-Natal, South Africa
- Occupations: Singer; songwriter; businessman; record producer
- Years active: 2004–present
- Spouse: Nandi Madida (m. 2016)
- Children: 2
- Parents: Jeffrey Khanyile (father); Nomthandazo Madida (mother)
- Musical career
- Genres: Jazz; Kwaito; dance music; Afro house; Afro tech
- Instruments: Vocals, Piano, Bass Guitar
- Labels: Mayonie Productions; Sony Music Africa; Mayonie Agency; IMG; AEM; Universal Music Group

Zakhele Madida (born 26 May 1981, KwaMashu F-section, KwaZulu-Natal), known professionally as Zakes Bantwini, is a South African singer, record producer and businessman.

== Early life ==
Zakhele Madida was born and raised in KwaMashu F-section in the province of KwaZulu-Natal. He went to Shayamoya Junior Primary School and later attended Nqabakazulu High School. At the age of 14 years, he had his first child. Despite facing the challenges of being a teenage father, he still went on to finishing his matric. After matriculating, he went on to study at Natal Technikon (now known as Durban University of Technology) where he received a national certificate in Light Music. This is also where he formed his own record label - called Mayonie Productions - while completing his final year. Madida received a diploma in Jazz and Music Performance after completing his studies at the University of KwaZulu-Natal in Durban. He also studied a Social Entrepreneurship Programme at Gordon Institute of Business Science, University of Pretoria.

== Career ==
=== 2011–2016: The Fake Book and Real Book: My Music Bible ===
In April 2011, his single "Clap Your Hands" was released, featuring Xolani Sithole.

In 2013, Madida released his studio album The Fake Book and Real Book: My Music Bible. The following year, the album was nominated in the Best Dance Album Category at the 20th SAMA Awards. On 23 June 2017, he released the album Love, Light & Music 2.

In 2020, Bantwini remixed Lauv's single "Modern Loneliness".

=== 2021–present: Ghetto King and The Star Is Reborn ===
At a Kunye Event, his single "Osama" with Kasango was teased. The song was scheduled to be released on 17 September 2021. On September 2, 2021, it was reported that the release date of "Osama" would be rescheduled to 10 September 2021. The song peaked at number one on Radio Monitor Charts and spent 10 weeks on it. In late 2021, he headlined to Miss South Africa 2021.

In early December 2021, Zakes' third studio album Ghetto King was released worldwide. The album was met with positive reviews from music critics. It features Khetha, BlaQRhythm, DeeTheGeneral, Drega, Karyendasoul, Mthunzi, Nana Atta, Nomkhosi, Skillz, and Skye Wanda.

In early February 2022, Apple Music featured Zakes as their 'Isigubhu' cover star.

The Star Is Reborn, Zakes fourth studio album, was released in December 2023. On The Star is Reborn, Bantwini worked with Karyendasoul, Drega, Masuda resulting in a genre-spanning record that incorporated electronic dance music styles and afro tech.

It was supported by the lead single "Mama Thula" featuring Skye Wanda, Thakzin, Drega, and Suffocate SA.

== Business ventures ==
In 2004, he established Mayonie Productions, which is known for music such as "Bum Bum", "Wasting My Time" and "Clap Your Hands".

Madida released his debut album The Good Life in 2008. Two years later, he released the album Love, Light and Music, which included songs like "Clap Your Hands" and "Wasting My Time".

=== L'vovo Derrango ===
In 2005, Madida helped launch the career of Kwaito artist Thokozani Ndlovu, who was later known by his stage name L'vovo Derrango. Under Mayonie Productions, Derrango released his debut album which was self-titled (Lvovo Derrango). The album gained him recognition as he was nominated at the SAMA Awards for the Best Kwaito Album. In 2007, he won the Best Kwaito and Song of the Year award at the MetroFM awards.

== Personal life ==
Madida has three children from previous relationships and two with his wife Nandi Madida (formerly Nandi Mngoma).

== Discography ==
=== Albums ===
Title	Album details
The Good Life	Released: 2008; Label: Mayonie Productions; Formats: Digital download
Love, Light and Music	Released: 2010; Label: Mayonie Productions X, Soulistic Music; Formats: Digital download
Mountain Deluxe Volume 4	Released: 2010; Label: Mayonie Productions; Formats: Digital download
The Fake Book and Real Book: My Music Bible	Released: 2013; Label: Mayonie Productions; Formats: Digital download
Love, Light and Music 2	Released: 2017; Label: Mayonie Productions; Formats: Digital download
Bossa Paris Nights	Released: 2017; Label: Mayonie Productions; Formats: Digital download
Ghetto King	Released: 3 December 2021; Label: Mayonie Productions, Paradise Sound System; Formats: Digital download, streaming
The Star Is Reborn	Released: 8 December 2023; Label: Mayonie Productions, Universal; Formats: Digital download, streaming

=== Singles ===
List of singles, with selected chart positions and certifications, showing year released and album name
Title	Year	Peak chart positions	Certifications	Album
Title	Year	ZA	Certifications	Album
"Osama" (with Kasango)	2021	1	RISA: 4× Platinum	Ghetto King
"Asanda" (with Kususa and Argento Dust)	2022	—	RISA: Platinum	Ubomi
"Jeteme" (with Kekelingo and Mpho.Wav)	2023	—		Pula
"Mama Thula" (with Skye Wanda, Thakzin and Suffocate SA)	2023	—		The Star Is Reborn
"Love Generation (Reimagined)" (Bob Sinclar, & Friends, Zakes Bantwini, Gary Pine)	2024	—		Non-album single
"—" denotes a recording that did not chart or was not released in that territory.

=== Other charted songs ===
List of other charted songs, with selected chart positions, showing year released and album name
Title	Year	Peak chart positions	Album
Title	Year	ZA	Album
"Girl in the Mirror" (featuring Skye Wanda)	2021	61	Ghetto King

== Awards and nominations ==
Year	Award Ceremony	Prize	Recipient/Nominated work	Result	Ref.
2010	16th South African Music Awards	Best Music Video of the Year	Juju (featuring Black Coffee)	Nominated	
2011	17th South African Music Awards	Record of the Year	Bum Bum	Nominated	
2011	17th South African Music Awards	Album of the Year	Love, Light and Music	Nominated	
2011	17th South African Music Awards	Male Artist of the Year	Love, Light and Music	Nominated	
2011	Metro FM Awards	Best Male Award	Love, Light and Music	Won	
2011	Chanel O Awards	Video of the Year	"Wasting My Time"	Won	
2022	DStv Mzansi Viewers' Choice Awards	Favourite music artist/group	Himself	Nominated	
2022	DStv Mzansi Viewers' Choice Awards	Favourite Song	"Osama"	Nominated	
2022	South African Music Awards	Best Dance Album	Ghetto King	Nominated	
2022	South African Music Awards	Album of the Year	Ghetto King	Nominated	
2022	South African Music Awards	Best Engineered Album of the Year	Ghetto King	Nominated	
2022	South African Music Awards	Male Artist of the Year	Ghetto King	Nominated	
2022	South African Music Awards	Best Collaboration	"Osama"	Won	
2022	South African Music Awards	Best Collaboration	"Imali" (Karyendasoul & Zakes Bantwini featuring Nana Atta)	Nominated	
2022	South African Music Awards	SAMRO Highest Airplay Composers	"Osama"	Won	
2022	Mzansi Kwaito House Music Awards	Best House Artist		Pending	
2022	Mzansi Kwaito House Music Awards	Best House Single		Pending	
2022	Mzansi Kwaito House Music Awards	Most Voted Song	"Osama"	Pending	
2022	Mzansi Kwaito House Music Awards	Best Music Video		Pending	
2022	All Africa Music Awards	Best Artist, Duo or Group in African Electro	Himself	Nominated	
2022	All Africa Music Awards	Best African DJ	Himself	Nominated	
2022	All Africa Music Awards	Artist of the Year	Himself	Nominated	
2022	Grammy Awards	Best Global Performance	"Bayethe" (Nomcebo Zikode, Wouter Kellerman, and Zakes Bantwini)	Won	
2023	Metro FM Awards	Best House Song	"Asanda" (Kususa, Argento Dust & Zakes Bantwini)	Nominated	
2023	SAMA	International Achievement	Himself		
2024	GQ Best Dressed Awards	Best Dressed Couple	Himself	Won	
