= Ami Faku =

South African singer-songwriter

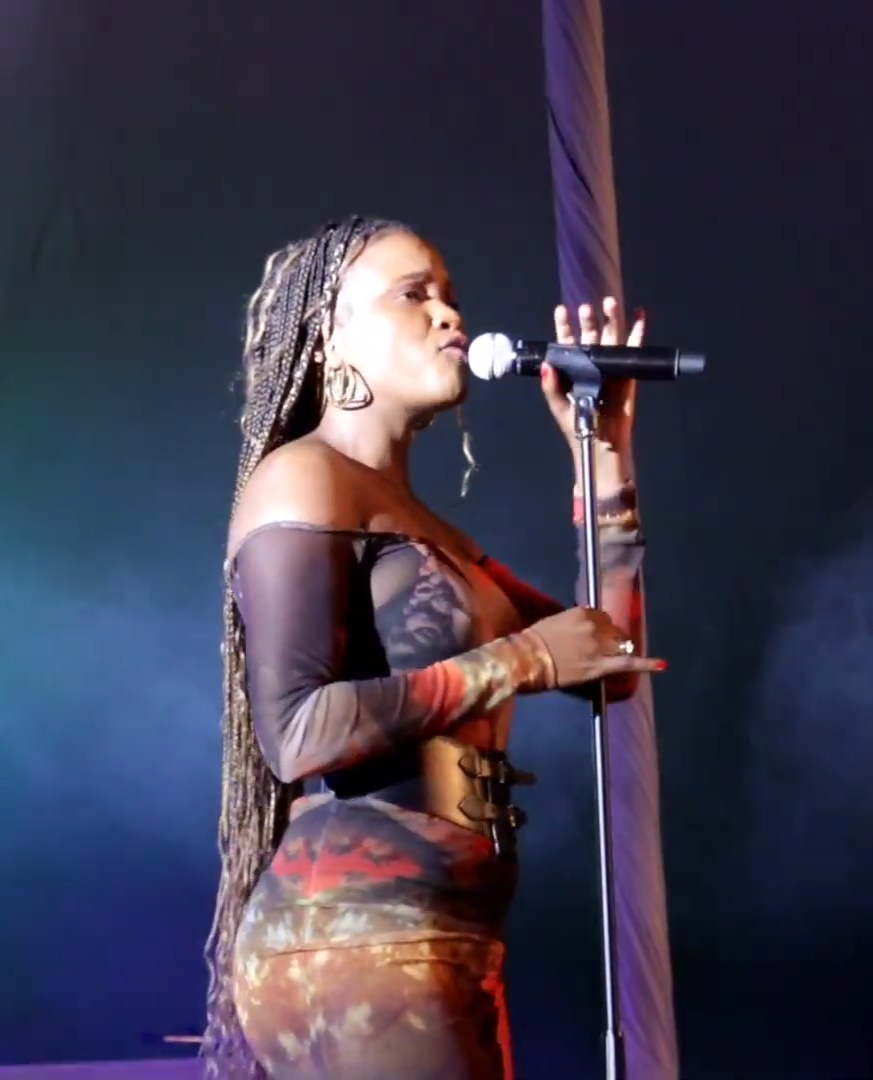

Background information
- Born: Amanda Faku; 28 May 1993 (age 33); Port Elizabeth, Eastern Cape
- Occupations: Singer; Songwriter
- Musical career
- Genres: R&B; Soul
- Instrument: Vocals
- Years active: 2017- Present
- Label: Vth Season

Amanda Faku (born 28 May 1993) is a South African singer, performer and songwriter. Born and raised in the township of eZinyoka, Port Elizabeth, she developed musical interest at the age of 6 and participated on church choirs. Faku rose to fame as a contestant on The Voice SA season 2 in 2017, prior to getting recognition in the music industry.

After she signed a record deal with The Vth Season, Ami released her debut studio album Imali (2019), debuted number one in South Africa. It reached Gold by the Recording Industry of South Africa (RiSA).

Mail & Guardian, ranked Faku number 27 on 200 Young South African, in 2020.

== Life and career ==
=== Early childhood ===
At the age of 6, Faku had developed a strong passion for music. She started singing at a house church which her father pastored and is influenced by the church, reggae, and hip hop. She later started recording music in early 2012 where her producer only lived a few blocks away from her house.

=== Career beginnings (2017–2019) ===
In 2017, she competed in the TV talent show, The Voice SA, which was her major breakthrough in the music industry. Though she did not win, she was signed by The Vth Season record label.

=== 2019–present: Imali, EA Wave Reimagines ===
Following her success on The Voice SA, she launched her debut single titled "Ndikhethe Wena". Faku later worked with De Mogul SA on the song "Ungowam". On 31 January 2020, her single "uWrongo" by South African DJ Prince Kaybee was released features Ami Faku, Shimza and Black Motion. The song was certified gold certification on Recording Industry of South Africa with sales of 25 000 units.

Faku collaborated with South African DJ and producer Sun-El Musician on a song titled "Into Ingawe", certified 3× platinum by Recording Industry of South Africa (RiSA). On 16 August, her single "Inde Lendlela" was released. The song later was certified platinum. On 26 September 2020, she released a single "Imali" featuring Blaq Diamond. The song was certified platinum by the Recording industry of South Africa.

On 27 September 2020, her debut studio album Imali was released. The album later was certified gold. It was produced by Blaq Diamond, Sun-El Musician, 37MPH Eternal Africa and Wilson. In November 2020, she was nominated for Best Female in Southern Africa and Best Newcomer at African Muzik Magazine Awards.

In 2020, she was named as the most-streamed female artist in South Africa by Deezer.

On 21 August, she released her EP titled EA Wave Reimagines. On 31 October, her single with Wichi 1080 "Never Let you go" was released.

=== 2021–present: New projects ===
On 22 January, she released a single "Lala Ngoxolo" featuring South African rapper Emtee.

In September 2021, Ami was featured on "Abalele" by Kabza de Small and DJ Maphorisa. The song debuted number 4 on Spotify Charts.

In early October 2021, she was featured with singer Sha Sha on Nomfundo Moh single "Phakade Lami". That same month, Ami made collaboration on African Lullabies Part 1 compilation album by Platoon.

In November 2021, she made collaboration with Kabza de Small and DJ Maphorisa on a single "Asibe Happy" released.

Faku released "Fatela" on 28 October 2022 together with Aymos. The song was certified platinum in South Africa.

== Discography ==
=== Studio albums ===
- Imali (2019)

=== EP's ===
- EA Wave Reimagines (2020)

=== As lead artist ===
List of singles as lead artist, with selected chart positions and certifications, showing year released and album name
Title	Year	Peak chart positions	Certifications	Album
Title	Year	ZA	Certifications	Album
"Ndikhethe Wena"	2018			Imali
"Ubuhle Bakho"	2019			Imali
"Inde Lendlela"	2019			Imali
"Mbize"	2019			Imali
"Love Drunk"	2019			Non-album single
"Ndiyeke" (Lemon & Herb, Ami Faku)	2019			Non-album single
"Regrets..."(Zoocci Coke Dope, Ami Faku)	2019			Non-album single
"Into Ingawe" (Sun-El Musician, Ami Faku)	2019	—	RiSA: 2× Platinum	Non-album single
"Khonza" (Kekelingo, Ami Faku)	2020			Non-album single
"Sihlobo Sami" (Kenza, Ami Faku)	2021			Non-album single
"Fatela" (Ami Faku and Aymos)	2022		Platinum	Non-album single
"There is Music in the Air" (Ami Faku, Black Coffee)	2022			Gallo Remixed
"Umthandazo" (Karyendasoul, Ami Faku)	2022			WL4OM
"Zimbali" (Prince Kaybee, Ami Faku)	2022			Gemini
"Andikayeki" (Heavy-K, Ami Faku)	2023			Non-album single

=== As featured artist ===
List of singles as featured artist, with selected chart positions and certifications, showing year released and album name
Title	Year	Peak chart positions	Certifications	Album
Title	Year	ZA	Certifications	Album
"Phakade Lami" (Nomfundo Moh featuring Ami Faku and Sha Sha)	2021	1	6× Platinum	Amagama
"Makwande" (Sun-El Musician, Fk Mash featuring Ami Faku)	2022			AEDM:Interstellar
"Unozala" (Kenza, Ami Faku, Msaki featuring Sun-El Musician)	2024	—		Non-album single

=== Guest appearances ===
Title	Year	Other artist(s)	Album
"Uyathandeka"	2020	Mthunzi	Selimathunzi
"Hamba Ngifike"	2020	Simmy	Tugela Fairy (Made of Stars)
"Uleleni"	2020	Black Motion	The Healers: The Last Chapter
"iLanga"	2020	Sun-El Musician, Simmy	To the World & Beyond
"Goduka"	2020	Sun-El Musician, Mthunzi	To the World & Beyond
"I Like it Anyway"	2021	Sun-El Musician	African Electronic Dance Music
"Esikhathini"	2022	Murumba Pitch, Sun-El Musician	Horumar
"Ndisize"	2024	Caiiro	Caiiro
"Imali"	2026	Sun-EL Musician, Tefo Foxx	Under The Sun
"Umlayezo"	2026	Sun-EL Musician, Mthunzi	Under The Sun

== Other charted and certified songs ==
List of other charted songs, with selected chart positions and certifications, showing year released and album name
Title	Year	Peak chart positions	Certifications	Album
Title	Year	ZA	Certifications	Album
"Ndisize" (Caiiro, Ami Faku)	2024	1		Caiiro
"—" denotes a recording that did not chart or was not released in that territory.

== Awards and nominations ==
Year	Award	Category	Results	Ref.
2020	26th SAMA	Female Artist of the Year	Won	
2020	26th SAMA	Newcomer of the Year	Nominated	
2020	26th SAMA	Best Afro Pop Album	Nominated	
2020	African Muzik Magazine Awards	Best Newcomer	Nominated	
2020	African Muzik Magazine Awards	Best Female Southern Africa	Nominated	
2021	Saafma	Best Female Artist Award	Cancelled	
2021	Saafma	Best Song of the Year	Cancelled	
2021	Saafma	Best Rising Star	Cancelled	
2023	Content Creator Awards	Song of the Year	Nominated	
2025	Metro FM Music Awards	Best Dance Song	Nominated	
2025	Metro FM Music Awards	Song of the Year	Nominated	
