= Mpura =

South African rapper (1995–2021)

- Also known as: Mpura Mpura; Mpura wadi bed time story
- Born: Mongezi Thomas Stuurman; 22 September 1995; Soweto, Gauteng, South Africa
- Died: 9 August 2021 (aged 25) near Rustenburg, North West, South Africa
- Genres: Amapiano
- Occupations: Rapper; Fashion designer; Record producer
- Instrument: Vocals
- Years active: 2018–2021

Mongezi Thomas Stuurman (22 September 1995 – 9 August 2021), known professionally as Mpura, was a South African rapper, fashion designer and record producer best known for his hit song "Umsebenzi Wethu", sung in Zulu language. He was also known for his most popular songs "Impilo Yase Sandton"

== Early life and education ==
Mpura was born and raised in Chiawelo extension 3 Soweto, Gauteng . He attended Highlands North Boys’ High School.

== Career ==
Before he rose to fame in the music industry, he was involved in fashion and founded Mpura Designs, a unisex street style brand. In 2018, he made his South African Fashion Week debut, showcasing his Autumn/Winter 2019 collection.

On 11 December 2020, he and Busta 929 featuring Lady Du, Reece Madlisa, Mr JazziQ and Zuma single Umsebenzi Wethu was released. The song reached number one local iTunes charts and was certified platinum.

== Awards and nominations ==
Year	Award ceremony	Prize	Result
2021	SA Amapiano Music Awards	Best Amapiano Lyricist/Rapper	Won

== Death ==
On 9 August 2021, Mpura died in a car accident on his way to perform at an event in the North West, alongside Thando & Killer Kau.
