= Entertainment Monitoring Africa =

South Africa's national airplay chart

- Industry: Entertainment, music
- Headquarters: Village Deep, Johannesburg, South Africa
- Key people: Andrew Irvine
- Products: Record charts, music news
- Website: mediamonitoringafrica.org

The airplay music charts in South Africa were gathered and published by the company Entertainment Monitoring Africa (EMA), formerly known as Mediaguide South Africa. It is a member of the Times Media Group, under Entertainment Logistics Services (ELS). The company provides a weekly top 10 airplay chart, which is available for viewing by the general public online. A top 100 is available for subscribed users of the company's website.

The first top 10 airplay chart under the EMA was issued for May 21, 2013, with its first number one single being "Blurred Lines" by Robin Thicke featuring T.I. and Pharrell Williams. In 2014, the City Press wrote that the EMA charts were "regarded as the industry standard when it comes to tracking what songs are being played on radio". EMA currently monitors 48 radio stations and 8 television stations.

== Local music and chart ==
A local content quota for radio was legislated by Independent Communications Authority of South Africa (ICASA) for public stations in South Africa to play a minimum of 40% local music, while commercial stations had a quota of 25%. EMA released a report at the end of 2013 that South African radio stations collectively played only 28% local music that year. Their analysis was based on an annual airplay chart posted for that year, where only 28 out of the year's top 100 songs were by local artists; the highest-placed song by a local artist was Mafikizolo's "Khona" which ranked at number five—it received more than 5500 spins in 2013. In contrast, the most played song that year was American singer Robin Thicke's "Blurred Lines" with over 7200 spins.

Linda Maseko, manager of South African record label Mentalwave, commented: "A shift needs to happen. We are still doing a full analysis with a view to naming the radio stations that are not complying. We need that money at home to improve the music industry. The same thing is happening with commercials. In other countries, you have to get special permission to use a foreign track on a commercial – and prove that you can't find the right local one." Conversely, Charl Blignaut of the City Press noted that "the most powerful hit factory in the country is not a major international record company, but a pioneering independent". Blignaut's observation was based on EMA's 2013 annual chart where local label Kalawa Jazmee secured over 7% of all airplay on the top 100 and 30% of all local airplay. He went on to conclude, "Independent artists are dominating the home-grown music playlists despite radio not meeting its local quotas". It was further noted that the local genres of gospel music, traditional and kwaito were in decline in 2013; while house music, Afro-pop and hip hop music were increasing in popularity.

In 2015, a local chart was launched online for public viewing without registration; similar to the main airplay chart, the local chart also provides a weekly top 10 based on airplay.

== Chart achievements ==
=== Songs with most weeks at number one ===
19 weeks

- Future Fue featuring Kuntra Gandhi — "Memeza (single)" (2017)
- DJ Clock featuring Beatenberg - "Pluto (Remember You)"

15 weeks

- Beatenberg — "Rafael" (2014)

13 weeks

- Mi Casa — "Jika" (2013)

11 weeks

- Robin Thicke featuring Pharrell Williams and T.I. — "Blurred Lines" (2013)

10 weeks

- Zakes Bantwini and Kasango - "Osama" (2021)

=== Artists with most number one songs ===
4

- Justin Bieber — "What Do You Mean?" (2015), "Sorry"(2016), "Love Yourself" (2016), "Company" (2016)

3

- Pharrell Williams — "Blurred Lines" (2013), "Get Lucky" (2013), "Happy (2014)"
- Rihanna - "The Monster" (2013), "Work" (2016), "This Is What You Came For" (2016)

2

- Poetic Hugo - "Hip Hop" (2016), "Society" (2017)
- Taylor Swift - "Blank Space" (2014), "Style" (2015)

== See also ==
- The Official South African Charts
