= 30th Annual South African Music Awards =

2024 award ceremony

30th South African Music Awards
- Sponsored by: The Motsepe Foundation; Proudly South African; Department of Sports, Arts and Culture; SABC1; Santam; SABC; CAPASSO; SAMPRA; Gauteng Department of Sport, Arts, Culture and Recreation; Joburg; YouTube
- Date: 2 November 2024; 20:00–23:37 SAST (UTC+02:00)
- Location: Gallagher Convention Centre, Midrand, Gauteng
- Country: South Africa
- Presented by: Recording Industry of South Africa
- Hosted by: Minnie Dlamini
- Preshow host: Luthando Shosha
- Motto: Less Noise, More Music

Highlights
- Most wins: Tyla (4)
- Most nominations: Tyla (7)
- Album of the Year: Kabza de Small and Mthunzi – Isimo
- Website: samusicawards.co.za

Television/radio coverage
- Network: SABC1; YouTube
- Runtime: 3:37:15 (incl. commercials)
- Produced by: Corinne Mokoka; Thabo Gama

The 30th Annual South African Music Awards (or SAMA 30) took place on 2 November 2024 at the Gallagher Convention Centre in Midrand, Gauteng. Hosted by Minnie Dlamini and presented by the Recording Industry of South Africa, the event was live streamed on YouTube and broadcast on SABC1 at 20:00 South Africa Standard Time (UTC+02:00). It honoured the best albums, music videos and songs released in South Africa during the period 15 April 2023 to 14 April 2024.

The nominations were announced on 26 September. Tyla received the most, with seven, followed by Kabza de Small with six. The pre-show took place on 1 November, and the industry awards and red carpet events preceded the main show on 2 November. Tyla won the most awards, receiving four (Newcomer of the Year, Best Pop Album, Female Artist of the Year and International Achievement). Kabza de Small and Mthunzi received three awards.

In the top five categories, Kabza de Small and Mthunzi's Isimo won Album of the Year and Duo or Group of the Year; Tyla's self-titled studio album won the aforementioned Newcomer of the Year and Female Artist of the Year. uGatsheni took home Male Artist of the Year.

== Background ==
The 30th Annual South African Music Awards celebrates the best music videos, albums and songs released in South Africa during the period 15 April 2023 to 14 April 2024. Entries for nomination consideration were open from 1 March 2024 to 15 April. For members of the Recording Industry of South Africa (RiSA), the entry fee for an individual or entity was R862.50 ($58.36), and for non-members it was R4,600.00 ($311.23) including value-added tax per entry for all categories.

Two public voting categories, Music Video of the Year (presented by RiSA) and Record of the Year (presented by the Motsepe Foundation), were announced via the South African Music Awards' website on 14 August 2024. The remaining nominations were announced on 26 September 2024 at the Gallagher Convention Centre in Midrand, Gauteng, where the ceremony would take place. Tyla was the most nominated artist with seven nominations, followed by Kabza de Small with six. (Note: This includes their nominations for the two public voting categories.)

YouTube and SABC1 partnered with RiSA to live stream and broadcast the event on 2 November 2024, at 20:00 South Africa Standard Time (UTC+02:00). Presented by RiSA, the ceremony was sponsored by the Motsepe Foundation; Department of Sports, Arts and Culture; SABC1; Santam; SABC; CAPASSO; SAMPRA, Gauteng Department of Sport, Arts, Culture and Recreation; Joburg, YouTube and Proudly South African.

On 18 October 2024, the South African Music Awards announced that Tyla would be honoured with the International Achievement Award. Sipho Makhabane and Ringo Madlingozi were the recipients for the Lifetime Achievement Awards. Oskido was bestowed the Chairperson's Award. On 2 November 2024, Tyla emerged as the most awarded artist with four accolades, ahead of Kabza de Small and Mthunzi with three.

== Winners and nominees ==
=== Top 5 categories ===
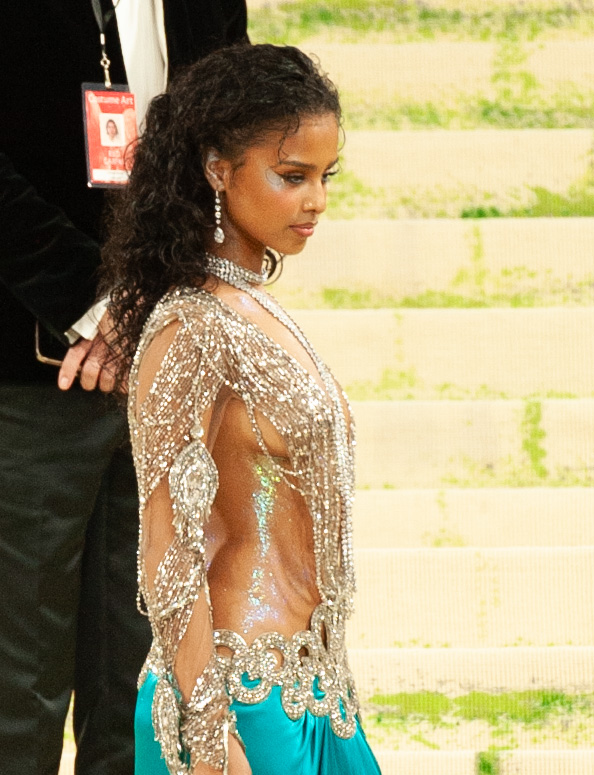
Tyla, Best Pop Album, International Achievement, Newcomer of the Year, Female Artist of the Year

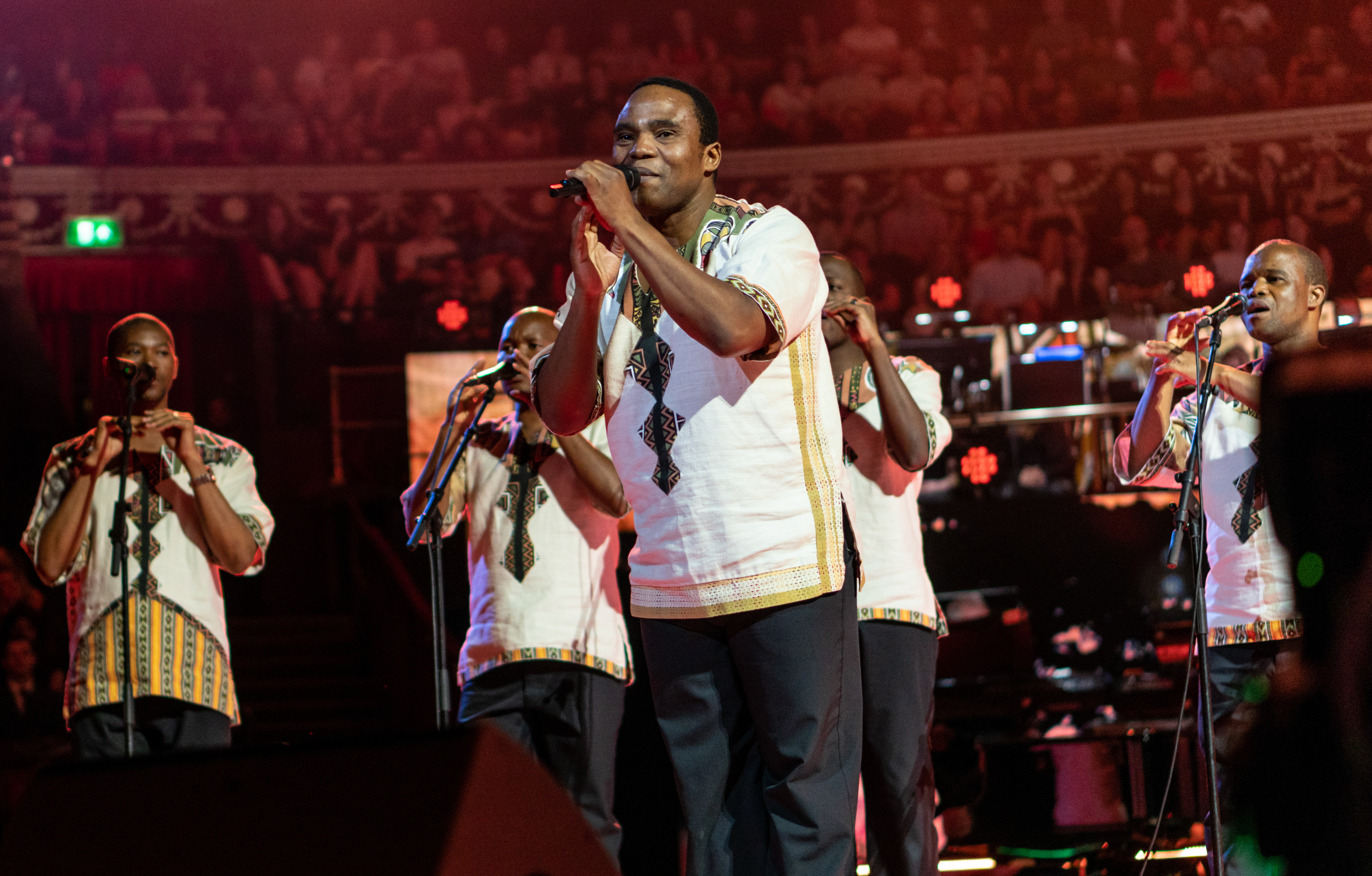
Ladysmith Black Mambazo, Best African Indigenous Faith Music Album winner

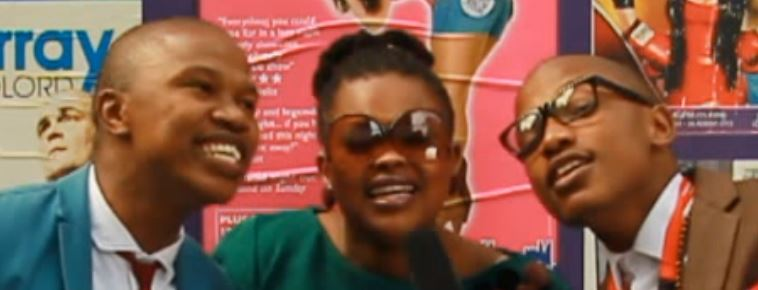
The Soil, Best Engineered Album winner

Below is the list of nominees. Winners are listed first and highlighted in bold.

Top 5 categories
**Album of the Year** **(Presented by SAMPRA)**: **Kabza de Small and Mthunzi – Isimo**; Tyla – Tyla; Daliwonga – Dali Dali; Ladysmith Black Mambazo – Soothe My Soul: Songs from Our South African Church; Xolly Mncwango – Unusual	**Duo or Group of the Year** **(Presented by Radio 2000)**: **Kabza De Small and Mthunzi – Isimo**; Mellow & Sleazy – Boroko Keng; FokofPolisieKar – Dans Deur Die Donker; Ladysmith Black Mambazo – Soothe My Soul: Songs from Our South African Church; Die Piesangskille and Johan Balt – Almal Gly
**Female Artist of the Year** **(Presented by Ukhozi FM)**: **Tyla – Tyla**; Brenda Mtambo – Sane; Lwah Ndlunkulu – Imizwa; Lordkez – Testament; Xolly Mncwango – Unusual	**Male Artist of the Year** **(Presented by Lesedi FM)**: **uGatsheni – Uyihlo noNyoko**; Priddy Ugly – Dust; Kelvin Momo – Kurhula; Daliwonga – Dali Dali; De Mthuda – Baba Yaga
**Newcomer of the Year** **(Presented by Santam)**: **Tyla – Tyla**; Sykes – Most Wanted; Lwah Ndlunkulu – Imizwa; Die Piesangskille and Johan Balt – Almal Gly; Joliza – Bhacasoul Experience EP

=== Album genre super categories ===
Album genre super categories
**Best Rock Album**: **Francois Van Coke – Dans Deur Die Donker**; Millennium – Deurbraak; Wonderboom – Hard Mode; Kenny Hughes – Born & Raised; Evert Snyman – All-Killer-Filler	**Best Pop Album**: **Tyla – Tyla**; Mila Smith – You Need Therapy; Will Linley – Magic; Paxton – 23:23; Matthew Mole – Wake Up, It's Morning
**Beste Pop Album**: **Die Piesangskille – Almal Gly**; Ryno Velvet – Heelal; Jan Jan Jan – Braaf; Brendan Peyper – Omdat Jy Mag; Ilán van Staden – My Mense	**Best Adult Contemporary Album (English)**: **Drakensberg Boys Choir – Stimela**; The Misty Cliffs – The Misty Cliffs; Dr Duda – The Drive; Jack Atlantic – Shipwrecked; Smama – Isipho
**Beste Kontemporêre Musiek Album**: **Elandré – Estetika**; Valiant Swart – Rondry, Fliek En Die Buitelewe; Neil Sandilands – Allegaarkie vir 'n Askeet; Joshua Na Die Reën – Die Vallei; Jacob Swann – Alles	**Best African Adult Contemporary Album** **(Presented by Ikwekwezi FM)**: **Brenda Mtambo – Sane**; Thee Legacy – Isicathamiya for a New Millennium; Bongeziwe Mabandla – Amaxesha; The Soil – Reimagined; Vusi Mahlasela – Umoya – Embracing the Human Spirit
**Best Alternative Album**: **I'm with the Singer – I'm with the Singer**; Carla Franco – Layers; Van Pletzen – Enter the Grootness (deluxe); CHXRL – Hopeless & Romantic; West Coast Wolves – Don't Forget to Howl	**Best R&B/Soul Album** **(Presented by UMhlobo Wenene FM)**: **Lordkez – Testament**; Ayanda Jiya – A Tale of a Fallen Queen; KashCPT – Love Letters; Uma Rams – Hold Me When It's Cold: The Cuddle Pack; Mia – The Other Side (deluxe EP)
**Best Hip Hop Album**: **Priddy Ugly – Dust**; Flvme – Note to Self; Nasty C – I Love It Here; Wordz – People Forget To Be People (deluxe); The Big Hash – Heartbreak Hotel	**Best Kwaito Album**: **Sykes – Most Wanted**; Abobhova – Ghetto Skomplaz; Sbu Malawyer – Celebrating 25 Years in the Game; Taylor K – Genesis; Zinaro – Inzalo YeKwaito 2nd Half
**Best Amapiano Album** **(Presented by Motsweding FM)**: **Kabza de Small and Mthunzi – Isimo**; Mellow & Sleazy – Boroko Keng; De Mthuda – Baba Yaga; Daliwonga – Dali Dali; Kelvin Momo – Kurhula	**Best Gqom Album**: **QueDJ – We Don't Play the Same Gqom 2**; Funky Qla – Dark or Durban; Bello No Gallo – Gqom to Another Level Vol. 1; Mr Thela – TronicsLand Series 2; General C'mamane – The Young Prince of Gqom
**Best Dance Album**: **Dlala Thukzin – Permanent Music 3**; Mörda and Thakzin – Asante II; Zakes Bantwini – The Star Is Reborn; DBN Gogo – Clickbait; Sculptured Music – Reputation	**Best Traditional Faith Album**: **Omega Khunou – Mororiseng**; Sneziey – Sibonga Umusa (Live); Thinah Zungu – Indumiso yaseStezi; Worship House – Worship House 20; University of Pretoria – uJehova
**Best Contemporary Faith Music Album** **(Presented by Thobela FM)**: **Xolly Mncwango – Unusual**; Brenden Praise – The Gift Vol. 1; We Will Worship – Izililo; 3C Live – We Bow Down; The Fellowship with Pastor Namba – Come to Jesus (Live in Bryanston, 2022)	**Best African Indigenous Faith Music Album**: **Ladysmith Black Mambazo – Soothe My Soul: Songs from Our South African Church**; JTG Gospel Choir – Alikho Elinye Ithemba; Lejwe la Motheo – Ke Nako ya Modimo; Di Bruin Gospel Projects – Masango; Discuss Nkuna – Vuya Matimba
**Best Traditional Album**: **The Soul Brothers – Hamba Naye**; Joliza – Bhacasoul Experience EP; Makhadzi – Mbofholowo; Shabalala Rhythm – I'm Happy; Shaka Ilembe – Shaka iLembe Soundtrack Album Volume 2 (Original Music from the Shaka iLembe TV Series)	**Best Maskandi Album**: **uGatsheni – Uyihlo noNyoko**; Inkos'yamagcokama – National Anthem; Sminofu – Uber Driver; Mthandeni SK – Amakhothangqoko; Ntencane – Isivulwe Yonke
**Best Jazz Album**: **Steve Dyer – Enhlizweni: Song Stories From My Heartland**; Hugh Masekela and Siparia Deltones – Siparia to Soweto; Thandi Ntuli and Carlos Niño – Rainbow Revisited; Vuma Levin – The Past Is Unpredictable, Only The Future Is Certain; Kujenga – In The Wake	**Best Classical/Instrumental Album**: **Fannie Dick – End of the Beginning**; UBeyond – Sci-fi, Beats & Life; Derek Gripper – Lost Time: Bach Cello Suite No. 1; Tony Drake – Lofi Chill; Karen Devroop – Relentless
**Best Afro Pop Album**: **Lwah Ndlunkulu – Imizwa**; Zuko SA – Umkhonto; Inkabi Zezwe – Ukhamba; Blaq Diamond – Zulu Romance; Nomfundo Moh – Ugcobo	**Best Reggae Album**: **Skeleton Blazer – Give Praises**; Undefynd – Musinion; Ras Vuyo – Love & Unity; Dimahr – Proof of Life; Two Point Ow – Love Expressions

=== Technical categories ===
Technical categories
**Best Produced Music Video**: **Kamo Mphela – "Dalie"** **(Producer: Kudzi)**; Sjava – "Amakhehla" (Producer: Tido); Loatinover Pounds – "4am" (Producer: BSV); Cassper Nyovest – "018" (Producer: Jabu); Filah Lah Lah – "Call Me" (Producer: Reabetswe Fila Ranamane)	**Best Produced Album**: **David Watkyns – No Other Love**; Nasty C – I Love It Here; Mbuso Khoza – Shaka iLembe Soundtrack Album Volume 2 (Original Music from the Shaka iLembe TV Series); Matthew Mole – Wake Up, It's Morning; Mbuso Khoza – Ifa Lomkhono
**Best Engineered Album**: **The Soil – Reimagined**; Mbuso Khoza – Shaka iLembe Soundtrack Album Volume 2 (Original Music from the Shaka iLembe TV Series); Matthew Mole – Wake Up, It's Morning; Vusi Mahlasela – Umoya – Embracing the Human Spirit; Brenda Mtambo – Sane	**Remix of the Year**: **Jnr SA – "Weekend Special" (Jnr SA remix)**; Bongeziwe Mabandla & Ntokzin – "Sisahleleni" (Ntokzin remix); Oscar Mbo – "Yes God" (Mörda, Thakzin, Mhaw Keys remix); Harrycane featuring Eemoh, Master KG and DJ Latinny – "Dubula"; Azana and Soa Mattrix – "Goodbye" (remix)
**Best Collaboration**: **Dlala Thukzin, Sykes and Zaba – "iPlan"**; Mörda and Thakzin – "Burning Bush"; De Mthuda, Da Muziqal Chef and Eemoh featuring Sipho Magudulela – "Sgudi Snyc"; Tyla and Travis Scott – "Water"; Kabza de Small and Mthunzi featuring Young Stunna, DJ Maphorisa, Sizwe Alakine and Umthakathi Kush – "Imithandazo"

=== Public vote ===
Public vote categories
**Record of the Year** **(Presented by the Motsepe Foundation)**: **Mathandeni SK featuring Lwah Ndlunkulu – "Paris"**; Tyler ICU and Tumelo_za featuring DJ Maphorisa, Nandipha808, Ceeka RSA and Tyron Dee – "Mnike"; Dlala Thukzin, Sykes and Zaba – "iPlan"; Kabza De Small and Mthunzi featuring Young Stunna, DJ Maphorisa, Sizwe Alakine and Umthakathi Kush – "Imithandazo"; DJ Stokie featuring Omit ST, Sobzeen and Zeenhle – "Awukhuzeki"; De Mthuda, Da Muziqal Chef and Eemoh featuring Sipho Magudulela – "Sgudi Snyc"; Tyla – "Water"; Bassie, Aymos featuring T-Man SA – "Izenzo"; Mellow & Sleazy, SjavasDaDeejay and TitoM featuring Tman Press – "Imnandi Lento"; Lady Amar, JL SA, Cici and Murumba Pitch – "Hamba Juba"; Sam Deep, Njelic and Aymos – "Isigubhu"; DJ Stokie and Eemoh – "Masithokoze"; Sam Deep, Eemoh and Da Muziqal Chef – "iMpumelelo"; Inkabi Zezwe – "Umbayimbayi"; Harrycane, Master KG, DJ LaTimmy – "Dubula"; Thabza Tee featuring Tman Xpress – "Nhliziyo yam eKhala Kakhulu"; Mas Musiq and Daliwonga featuring DJ Maphorisa and Kabza de Small – "Gangnam Style"; DJ Kent featuring Brenden Praise, Mörda and Mo-T – "Horns in the Sun"; Shakes & Les, DBN Gogo, Zee Nxumalo featuring Ceeka RSA and Chley – "Funk 55"; Kabza de Small and DJ Maphorisa featuring Njelic – "Nana Thula"	**Music Video of the Year** **(Presented by RiSA)**: **AKA and Nasty C – "Lemons (Lemonade)"**; Busta 929, featuring Boohle – "Ngixolele"; Tyla – "Water"; Tyler ICU, Tumelo_za featuring DJ Maphorisa, Nandipha808, Ceeka RSA and Tyron Dee – "Mnike"; MaWhoo, DJ Maphorisa and Kabza de Small – "Kulula"; Lady Amar, JL SA, Cici, Murumba Pitch – "Hamba Juba"; Dlala Thukzin, Sykes and Zaba – "iPlan"; Mas Musiq, featuring Aymos and Young Stunna – "Sengizwile"; Sam Deep, Eemoh, Da Muziqal Chef – "iMpumelelo"; Win Linley – "Last Call"; Soa Mattrix, Mashudu featuring Emotionz DJ, Happy Jazzman – "Mina Nawe"; De Mthuda, Da Muziqal Chef and Eemoh featuring Sipho Magudulela – "Sgudi Snyc"; Loatinover Pounds, featuring 25K, Thapelo Ghutra – "Sosh Plata" (remix); Mörda and Oscar Mbo featuring Murumba Pitch – "Mohigan Sun"; Blxckie – "Ronda"; MaWhoo and Master KG featuring Lowsheen – "Ngiyamthanda"; Lowsheen, Master KG and Nkosazana Daughter – "Thula"; Lwah Ndlunkulu – "Ngiyeza"; Lowsheen, Master KG and Basetsana – "Lwakho"

== Special awards ==
In the list below, winners are highlighted in bold where necessary.

Special awards
**Lifetime Achievement Award**
Sipho Makhabane and Ringo Madlingozi
**International Achievement Award**
Tyla
**Chairperson's Award**
**(Presented by RiSA)**
Oskido
**Most Streamed Song of the Year**
**(Presented by CAPASSO)**
"Mnike"
**Rest of Africa Award**
- **Edgar Muzah – Son of a Tribe (Royalty Edition)**
- **Wurld – Don't Get Used to This**
  - Asake – Work of Art
  - Bensoul – Lion of Sudah
  - Bien – Alusa Why Are You Topless?

== Performances ==
Adapted from the live broadcast.

=== Pre-show, industry awards and red carpet ===
Industry Awards performances
Artist(s)	Song(s)
Sykes	"iPlan"
De Mthuda, De Muziqal Chef and Eemoh	"Sgudi Snyc"

=== Main show ===
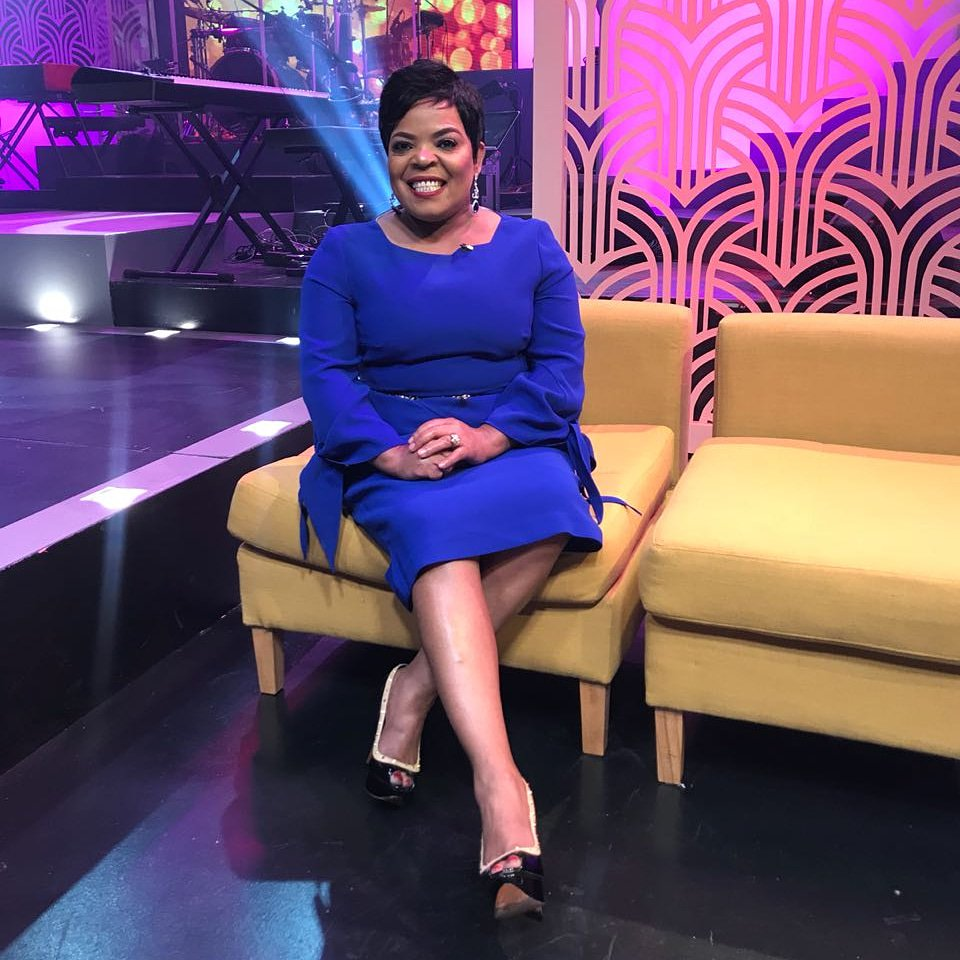
Rebecca Malope was one of the SAMA 30 performers.

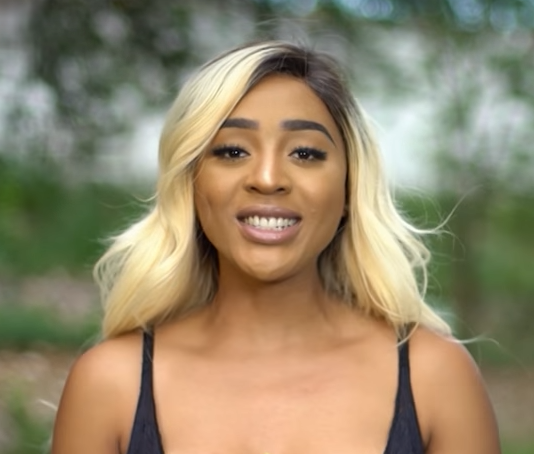
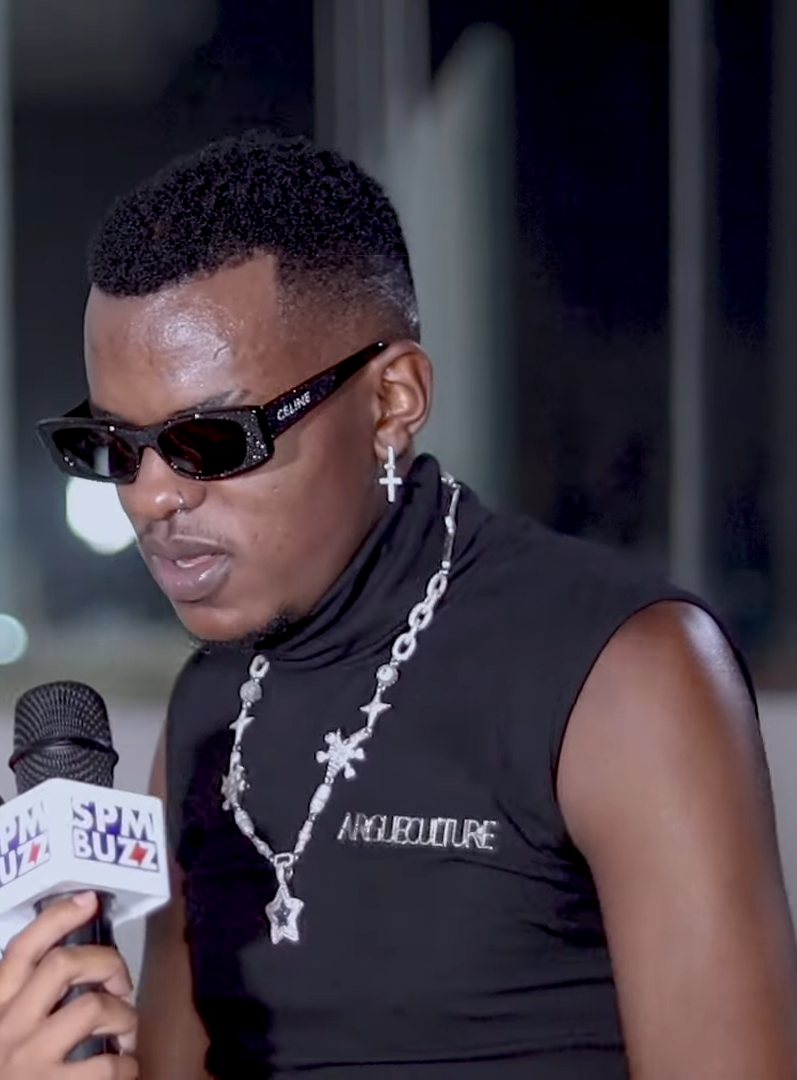
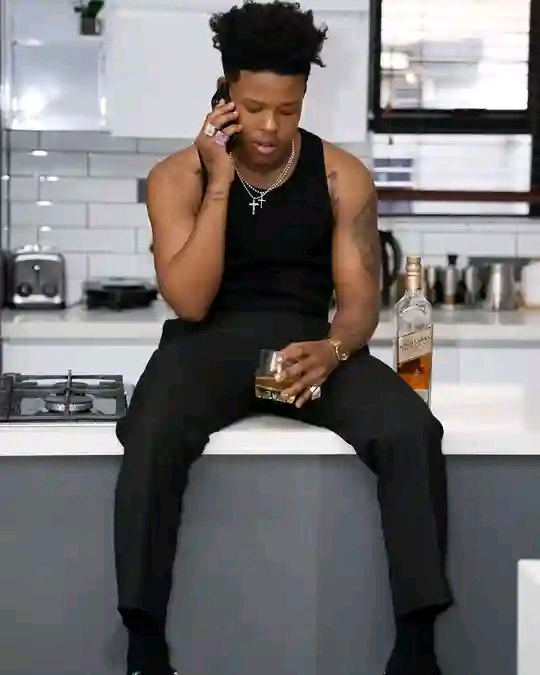
Three of the SAMA 30 performers were Nadia Nakai, Musa Keys and Nasty C.

Main show performances
Artist(s)	Song(s)
Ishmael	"Waar Was Jy" "Motherland"
Thebe	"Ungawa Kum"
Skwatta Kamp	"Umoya"
Babes Wodumo	"Wololo"
Mthunzi	"Imithandazo"
Busiswa	"Banomoya"
Liquideep	"Fairy Tale"
Bucie	"Superman"
TK	"How Do You Feel"
Cici	"Stay Real"
Dozi	"Ryperd"
Matthew Mole	"Take Yours, I'll Take Mine"
Will Linley	"Tough"
Ihashi Elimhlophe	"Uthando Lunjani"
Mma Ausi	"Setemela"
Bhudaza	"Khera"
DJ Nomza The King and Tebza De DJ	"Ka Valungu"
Gatsheni	"Hit After Hit"
Nasty C and Manana	"Broken Marriages"
Okmalumkoolkat	"100k Macassette"
Nadia Nakai	"Amantombanaze" (remix)
Emtee	"Roll Up"
Priddy Ugly	"Nja'ka"
Khuli Chana	"Tswa Daar"
Living in Christ Legend	"Ngisize"
Xolly Mncwango	"Umuhle Baba"
Rebecca Malope	"Umoya Wam"
Winnie Mashaba	"Re Tla Mo Leboga Kang"
Bucy Radebe	"Uzugcin'impilo Yam'"
Ringo Madlingozi	"Sondela" "Ekuseni"
Sipho Makhabane	"The Power" "It Is Well" "Sizohamba" "Indonga"
Musa Keys	"Kancane"
Babalwa M & Nia Pearl	"Amalobolo"
Boohle	"Hamba Wena"
TxC	"Yebo"
TiToM and Yuppe	"Tshwala Bam"
Zee Nxumalo	"Thula Mabota"
DJ Cleo	"Nkalakatha" "Izinja" "Phants' Komthuzi Welanga" "Manyonyoba" "Shibobo / The Final Countdown" "Ghets Ghetsa" "Umdlwembe" "Dlala Mapantsula"
Arthur Mafokate and Chomee	"Emenwe" (Menwana mix) "Mnike" "Zambo" (Maestro mix) "K****r" (Maestro mix) "K****r" (House mix) "Sika Lekhekhe"
Musa Sukwene	"Malo We"
Lwah Ndlunkulu	"Ngiyanthandaza" "Eyami"
Joe Nina	"Zodwa"
Mgarimbe and DJ Buckz	"Sister Bethina"
DJ Buckz	"Y-tjukutja"
DJ Spoko	"Mugwanti"
Big Nuz	"Umlilo"
Masterpiece	"Manzi Nte"

== Presenters ==
Hosted by Luthando Shosha (also known as Lootlove), the pre-show took place on 1 November 2024, at the Gallagher Convention Centre. She also hosted the industry awards event. Preceding the main show, the red carpet event was hosted by Siphesihle Vazi and Kuhle Adams. The main show was hosted by Minnie Dlamini, with assistance from Zanele Potelwa and Unathi Nkayi. Internet personalities including Ntando Duma were in attendance at the main event.

=== Live broadcast ===
Adapted from the live broadcast.

Pre-show, industry awards and red carpet

- Bitsa Lenkopane – presented Best Adult Contemporary Album
- Luthando Shosha – presented Beste Kontemporêre Musiek Album, Best Afro Pop Album, Best Rock Album, Best African Indigenous Faith Music Album, Best Reggae Album, Best Produced Album, Best R&B/Soul Album and Best Contemporary Faith Album
- Bontle Modiselle – presented Best Traditional Album & Best Alternative Album and Best Pop Album
- Salvon and Bravo Le Roux – presented Best Classical/Instrumental Album and Best Traditional Faith Album
- Dada Morero & Pinky Bala – presented Best Jazz Album, Best Kwaito Album and Best Gqom Album
- DJ Fefe and Tumi Powerhouse – presentedb Remix of the Year and Best Collaboration
- Minnie Ntuli – presented Best Dance Album and Best Produced Music Video

Main show

- Minnie Dlamini – introduced Zanele Potelwa and Nondumiso Ngobese
- Nondumiso Ngobese Mabece – presented Newcomer of the Year
- Nimrod Nkosi – presented Performance 2
- Douglas Mosadi and Chomee – presented Best Amapiano Album
- Matome Chiloane and Unathi Nkayi – presented Chairperson Award
- Musa Zondi and Tshedi Moholo – presented Best Maskandi Album
- Matome Chiloane and Wouter Kellerman – presented International Achievement Award
- Gayton McKenzie and Rebecca Malope – presented Performance 7 and the Lifetime Achievement Awards
- Nomsa Chabeli and Bucy Radebe – presented Music Video of the Year
- Lerato Matsoso and Refilwe Modiselle – presented Most Streamed Song of the Year
- DJ Cleo – presented Duo or Group of the Year
- Thabo Mokone and Wanda Baloyi – presented Male Artist of the Year
- Mroza Buthelezi and Elle Tisane – presented Female Artist of the Year
- Tiyani Maluleke and Tshepi Seakamela – Album of the Year
- Rejoice Simelane and Hlompho Kekana – presented Record of the Year

== Prizes ==
The cash prizes awarded to the winners of the Annual South African Music Awards. Adapted from the SAMA 30 general rules booklet.

List of cash prizes per category
Awards	Prizes	
Awards	ZAR	USD
Top 5 categories	15 000	1014.88
Album of the Year	25 000	1691.47
Genre categories	10 000	676.59
Chairman's Award	20 000	1353.18
Lifetime Achievement Award	20 000	1353.18
International Achievement Award	20 000	1353.18
Technical awards	10 000	676.59
Best-selling awards	10 000	676.59
Album of the Decade	20 000	1353.18
Record of the Decade	20 000	1353.18
Public vote categories	20 000	1353.18
Most Streamed Song of the Year	10 000	676.59

== In Memoriam ==
In memoriam segment was introduced by host Minnie Dlamini, with "Angiphili Mawungekho" by Sabelo Mthembu playing in the background.

- Sandile "Mapaputsi" Ngwenya
- Bokang "Malome Vector" Moleli
- Lizwilenkosi "Lizwi Wokuqala" Mtshali
- Jessica Mbangeni
- Timmy "Ngqungqumbana" Kwebulana
- Bulelwa "Zahara" Mkutukana
- Tony Cedras
- Siphiwe "General GTZ" Sibisi
- Thabiso Sikwane
- Bheka "Beekay" Mchunu
- Nomvula "Milkflow" Mkhumbuza
- Mthombeli "KCI" August
- Gerald "Mac" McKenzie
- Nhlamulo "DJ Mulo" Hlungwani
- Colin "Bones" Delight
- Zanele Mbokazi-Nkambule
- Joe Ntsako Makhanza
- Surabjit Jaybelly Baldeo
- Robert Schroder
- Chris Ghelakis
- Mbongeni Ngema
- Alvin Dyers
- Peter "Mashata" Mabuse
- Abraham Molabe Mmakola
- Solomon "Solly Moholo" Molokoane

== Reaction ==
Avatar of Don Billiato

**Don Billiato**
(@casspernyovest)
tweeted:

No ways. Tyla won a Grammy for water bro but she don't get the Sama for record of the year at home ? Haha y'all are playing games.

2 November 2024

Tyla's "Water" lost the Record of the Year award to Mthandeni SK and Lwah Ndlunkulu's "Paris". Following the conclusion of the main show on 2 November, Cassper Nyovest posted on Twitter to express his feelings on how Tyla was snubbed of the accolade. In response, Mthandeni SK implied that Nyovest, a hip hop musician, was trying to use maskandi to regain fame. In Nyovest's apology, he suggested a boxing match to address their issues. On 3 November, Zakes Bantwini criticized DJ Cleo's performance when he posted on Twitter and said that he felt like the Durban kwaito era was not well represented in the DJ's medley mix. In response to Bantwini on 4 November, DJ Cleo praised Bantwini's craft before saying that the South African Music Awards are very political and are not his show. Bantwini later apologized and said that his emotions were driven by his passion for music, and that he should have reached out privately.

After the South African Music Awards had Arthur Mafokate and Cici perform at the same event despite their 2018 assault allegations, Cici expressed her feelings on Twitter the following day when she tweeted three brokenhearted emojis. Although Mafokate was acquitted due to lack of evidence to prosecute, the Women for Change organization called for a boycott for Chris Brown's South African concert in December 2024 due to his controversial past, but the South African Music Awards celebrated Mafokate's performance. Independent Online wrote that "it is very important to differentiate between Mafokate and Brown, as the former was not charged, while Brown pled guilty on multiple occasions".
