= 31st Annual South African Music Awards =

Annual South African Music Awards

31st South African Music Awards
- Sponsored by: The Motsepe Foundation; Department of Sports, Arts and Culture; CAPASSO; SAMRO; SAMPRA; SABC
- Date: 14 December 2025
- Country: South Africa
- Presented by: Recording Industry of South Africa
- Hosted by: Scoop Makhathini; Pamela Mtanga
- Motto: Less Noise, More Music

Highlights
- Most wins: Thandiswa Mazwai (4)
- Most nominations: Black Motion, Thandiswa Mazwai, Kelvin Momo (5 each)

Television/radio coverage
- Network: SABC1; YouTube

The 31st Annual South African Music Awards (or SAMA31) were initially scheduled for the first half of 2025 but have been rescheduled to 14 December 2025. Primarily sponsored by the Motsepe Foundation, the event is presented by the Recording Industry of South Africa. It will be broadcast live on YouTube and SABC1, honouring excellence in South African Music by celebrating the best albums, music videos, and songs released in South Africa between 16 April 2024 and 31 January 2025.

== Background ==
The 31st Annual South African Music Awards (SAMA31) celebrates the excellency in South African music and honours the best music videos, albums and songs commercially released in the country during the period 16 April 2024 to 31 January 2025. Entries for nomination consideration were open from 10 December 2024 to 31 January. For members of the Recording Industry of South Africa (RiSA), the entry fee for an individual or entity was R862.50 ($58.36), and for non-members it was R4,600.00 ($311.23) including value-added tax per entry for all categories. The RiSA extended the entry period to 10 February 2025, due to various requests from the industry.

The South African Music Awards (SAMAs) have struggled to secure sponsorship since MTN ended its partnership in 2014. The SAMAs signed a three-year contract with the Motsepe Foundation in 2023, which sponsored the ceremonies in 2023 and 2024, with 2025 marking their final year. To attract new sponsors, the SAMAs' spokesperson, Lesley Mofokeng told The Citizen that the SAMA31 will take place in the first half of 2025, the first since 2019. In August 2025, RiSA announced that the event was rescheduled to November 2025, sponsored by the Motsepe Foundation, the Department of Sports, Arts and Culture, CAPASSO, SAMRO, SAMPRA, and SABC as a media partner. They also confirmed no red carpet event would occur, with the first bach of nominations (Technical Categories, Album Genre Super Categories and the Rest of Africa Award) announced virtually on the SAMAs' social media platforms on 28 August 2025, from 18:00 to 19:00 South Africa Standard Time (UTC+02:00).

The Public Voting Categories, Record of the Year and Music Video of the Year were not open for submissions. Record of the Year nominees were selected using a weighted formula combining airplay (tracked by Radiomonitor) and streams (from the Official South African Charts) to determine the top 20 songs. Music Video of the Year nominees were chosen based on the most-played music videos (excluding visualiser) from RiSA Audio Visual Licensing NPC and YouTube data, collected between 16 April 2024, and 31 January 2025.

== Winners and nominees ==
Below is the list of nominees. Winners are listed first and highlighted in bold.

=== Top 5 Categories ===
Special awards
**Album of the Year**
- **Goldmax – Play at Your Own Risk**
**Duo or Group of the Year**
- **Black Motion - "Takala"**
**Female Artist of the Year**
- **Thandiswa Mazwai**
**Male Artist of the Year**
- **Goldmax – Play at Your Own Risk**
**Newcomer of the Year**
- **Nontokozo Mkhize - Lindiwe**

=== Album Genre Super Categories ===
Album genre super categories
**Best Amapiano Album**: **Kelvin Momo – Ntsako**; Vigro Deep – Your Piano is Not My Piano; Kelvin Momo – Sewe; Mellow & Sleazy – Midnight in Sunnyside 3; Zee Nxumalo – Inja Ya Game
**Beste Kontemporêre Musiek Album**: **Spoegwolf – Eindbestemming**; Pietman Geldenhuys – Vaalsand; Neil Sandilands – Land & Sand; Ampie – Niemandsland; Majo – Geraamtes	**Best African Adult Contemporary Album**: **Thandiswa Mazwai – Sankofa**; Zamajobe – UMI; Zoe Modiga – Nomthandazo; Ndu Shezi – Isibusiso Sam; Mthuthu – Indumiso YabeNguni
**Best Alternative Album**: **Francis Soal – Hindsight 2020**; Yoav and Jabulile Majola – Unyazi; Zadok – Perspective: Black; Th&o – Emlotheni; Spoegwolf – Berge	**Best R&B/Soul Album**: **Elaine – Stone Cold Heart**; Mikhalé Jones – Too Many Promises; Filah Lah Lah – On Air; Clxrity – It's Clear to See; The Big Hash – Heartbreak Hotel (Deluxe)
**Best Hip Hop Album**: **25K – Loyal to the Plug: The Life & Times of Don Kilograms**; Blxckie – See U Soon (Deluxe); Tony Dayimane – Red October: Induction; Loatinover Pounds – Pray 4 Pitori; Sizwe Alakine – Audio 2D: Deaf Darkie	**Best Rock Album**: **MaxX and Love – These Blues Might Get You Too**; Bloumoord – Vir Mekaar; Prime Circle – The World We Know; The Man Motels – Old Wounds; The Morning After – Look at You Now
**Best Adult Contemporary Album (English)**: **Melanie Scholtz – Seven**; Just 6 – uKhisimusi – An African Christmas; Tony Drake – Room for Everyone; Nue Sam – Nonyezi; The Morning After – Look at You Now	**Best Gqom Album**: **Goldmax – Play at Your Own Risk**; Mr Thela – Tronics Land 3; DJ Lag – The Rebellion; DJ Sandiso – Nande 3.0; Lelowhatsgood – Next Level
**Best Dance Album**: **Dlala Thukzin – Finally Famous Too**; Black Motion – The Cradle of Art; Mörda – Cr4zy!!..; Shimza – Dreaming; Caiiro – Caiiro	**Best Traditional Faith Album**: **Ayanda Ntanzi – According to Grace, a One Man Show**; Betusile – Uyinqoba Yam (Jehovah Nissi); Tebs David – The Journey (Part 1); Malusi Mbokazi – The Full Circle Revival; Rofhiwa Manyaga – Rofhiwa Dzina
**Best Contemporary Faith Music Album**: **Takie Ndou – The Glory**; Jabu Hlongwane – Crossover Experience 4; SbuNoah – Heavenly Psalm Level 2 (Live at Goshen City Church); Nontokozo Mkhize – Lindiwe; Mmangaliso – Living Word	**Best African Indigenous Faith Music Album**: **JTG Gospel Choir – Morena Re Ya Leboga**; Wacha Mkhukhu Wachumlilo – Re Kgoeletsa Magodimong; House of Mercy – Busa Jeso; Barongoa Ba Morena – Ikutana; Di Bruin Gospel Projects – Nkapese Ka Maatla
**Best Traditional Album**: **Makhadzi Entertainment – Miracle Child (Deluxe)**; Keitumetse Mangate Production – O Moleele; MmaAusi – Mmakgodu; Pleasure Tsa Manyalo – Bakokota	**Best Maskandi Album**: **Khuzani – Angidlali Nezingani**; Umafikizolo – Ngathi Nguye; Phuzekhemisi – iPolitiki; Ntencane – Alingeni; Imithente – Amathambo Kagogo
**Best Jazz Album**: **Peter Auret – Hope Dies Last**; Nduduzo Makhathini – uNomkhubulwane; Nick Ford – Terra Solus; Nomfundo Xaluva – Ndilapha; Ncesh Nonxishi – Apho Kungenje	**Best Classical/Instrumental Album**: **Derek Gripper – Ballaké Sissoko & Derek Gripper**; John Lundun – In the Morning; Chris Vale, Eugene Joubert and Franco Prinsloo, Marlize Hattingh – By Allen Skone Dinge; Vox Chamber Choir and Franco Prisloo – A Season in Paradise; Orecchiette – Awake for 22 Hours
**Best Afro Pop Album**: **Sjava – Isibuko (Deluxe)**; Nomfundo Moh – Twenty Four; Malik – Malik; Sjava – Inkanyezi (Live); Dalom Kids – Collaboration with Friends	**Best Reggae Album**: **Luwe Da Lion – After All**; Dream Lloyd – Mekwei; Anele Jahmena – The Rise; Dimahr – Flaws in Frame; Botanist Mr Lamington – Area Code

=== Technical Categories ===
Technical categories
**Best Produced Music Video**: **Shekhinah featuring Moliy – "Risk"**; Soa Mattrix – "Umbuzo"; Mthandeni SK featuring MaWhoo – "Gucci"; TitoM and Yuppe featuring S.N.E and EeQue – "Tshwala Bam"; Blxckie – "South"	**Best Produced Album**: **Thandiswa Mazwai – Sankofa**; Zamajobe – UMI; Black Motion – The Cradle of Art; Qü – Reprise on 2nd Avenue; Linda Sikhakhane – iLadi
**Best Engineered Album**: **Thandiswa Mazwai – Sankofa**; Black Motion – The Cradle of Art; Sjava – Isibuko (Deluxe); Keenan Meyer – Reawakening; Jeremy Loops – Feathers & Stone	**Remix of the Year**: **Mpho.Wav – "Hlala"**; TitoM, Yuppe and Burna Boy featuring S.N.E – "Tshwala Bam" (Remix); Woodblock DJs, Mvelost, Sef Off and Somololo – "Skuta Baba"; Jnr SA Tycoon – "Mngani"; Alec Rorisang Kobeng – "Iza Mawala"
**Best Collaboration**: **Black Motion and Afrikan Roots featuring Mörda and DJ Buckz – "Takala"**; Kelvin Momo, Sino Msolo and Stixx featuring Mashudu – "Waze Wamuhle"; Kususa and Anatii featuring MaWhoo, Noxolo Ngema and King Deetoy – "Ematshwaleni"; Matt Davies and Masuda – "Stay with Me"; Mas Musiq, Lawd Weezy and DJ Maphorisa featuring Starquality, Chley and Kabza de Small – "Amalang"

=== Public Vote ===
Public vote categories
**Record of the Year**: **Mthandeni SK ft. MaWhoo - Gucci**	**Music Video of the Year**: **Mthandeni SK ft. MaWhoo - Gucci**

== Special awards ==
In the list below, winners are highlighted in bold where necessary.

Special awards
**Lifetime Achievement Award**
- Solly Moholo
**International Achievement Award**
**Chairperson's Award**
**Most Streamed Song of the Year**
- Bassie – "Kwelanga 2.0" ft M Touch, Ranger, Amaza, Tman Xpress, LeeMcKrazy & Zimmy
**Rest of Africa Award**
- **Ayra Starr – The Year I Turned 21**
  - Bensoul – The Party & After Party
  - Wizkid – Morayo
  - Tems – Born in the Wild
  - Fireboy DML – Adedamola

== Prizes ==
The cash prizes awarded to the winners of the Annual South African Music Awards. Adapted from the SAMA31 general rules booklet.

List of cash prizes per category
Awards	Prizes	
Awards	ZAR	USD
Top 5 categories	15 000	1014.88
Album of the Year	25 000	1691.47
Genre categories	10 000	676.59
Chairman's Award	20 000	1353.18
Lifetime Achievement Award	20 000	1353.18
International Achievement Award	20 000	1353.18
Technical awards	10 000	676.59
Best-selling awards	10 000	676.59
Album of the Decade	20 000	1353.18
Record of the Decade	20 000	1353.18
Public vote categories	20 000	1353.18
Most Streamed Song of the Year	10 000	676.59
