= Isimo =

Studio album by Kabza de Small and Mthunzi
- Released: 27 October 2023
- Length: 60:06
- Label: Piano Hub; Sony Music Africa
- Producer: Kabelo Motha

Kabza de Small chronology
The Konka Mixtape: Sweet & Dust (2023)	Isimo (2023)	Bab' Motha (2025)

Mthunzi chronology
Selimathunzi (2020)	Isimo (2023)

Isimo is a collaborative studio album by Kabza de Small and Mthunzi. It was released by Piano Hub and Sony Music Africa on 27 October 2023.

== Accolades ==
Isimo won the Best Produced Album at the 18th Metro FM Music Awards. In addition, the album won the Best Amapiano Album (presented by Motsweding FM), Duo or Group of the Year (presented by Radio 2000) and Album of the Year (presented by SAMPRA) at the 30th Annual South African Music Awards.

Awards and nominations for Isimo
Organization	Year	Category	Result	Ref.
Metro FM Music Awards	2024	Best Produced Album	Won	
South African Music Awards	2024	Best Amapiano Album	Won	
South African Music Awards	2024	Duo or Group of the Year	Won	
South African Music Awards	2024	Album of the Year	Won	

== Track listing ==
Isimo track listing
No.	Title	Writer(s)	Producer(s)	Length
1.	"Impumelelo" (featuring Young Stunna)	Njabulo Mthunzi Ndimande; Sandile Fortune Msimango	Kabelo Motha	7:47
2.	"Amazwe" (featuring MaWhoo)	Njabulo Mthunzi Ndimande; Nontobeko Thandeka Ngema	Kabelo Motha	7:43
3.	"Isibusiso"	Njabulo Mthunzi Ndimande	Kabelo Motha	7:24
4.	"Imithandazo" (featuring Young Stunna, DJ Maphorisa, Sizwe Alakine and Umthakathi Kush)	Njabulo Mthunzi Ndimande; Sandile Fortune Msimango; Sizwe Moeketsi; Tshepo Michael Makhubela	Kabelo Motha; Themba Sekowe	5:51
5.	"Asifanelene"	Njabulo Mthunzi Ndimande	Kabelo Motha	7:45
6.	"Bonga" (featuring MaWhoo)	Njabulo Mthunzi Ndimande; Nontobeko Thandeka Ngema	Kabelo Motha	7:56
7.	"Umoya Wami"	Njabulo Mthunzi Ndimande	Kabelo Motha	7:41
8.	"Deep Kiss"	Njabulo Mthunzi Ndimande	Kabelo Motha	7:22
9.	"Ngithobe"	Njabulo Mthunzi Ndimande	Kabelo Motha	7:25
Total length:				60:06

== Personnel ==
Credits are adapted from AllMusic.

- DJ Maphorisa – vocals, songwriter
- Kabza de Small – piano, producer
- MaWhoo – vocals
- Mthunzi – vocals, composer
- Nontobeko Ngema – composer
- Sizwe Moeketsi – vocals, songwriter
- Tshepo Makhubela – composer
- Umthakathi Kush – vocals
- Young Stunna – vocals, songwriter
