= South African Music Award for Newcomer of the Year =

Award presented by the Recording Industry of South Africa

- Country: South Africa
- Presented by: Recording Industry of South Africa
- First award: 1995
- Currently held by: Tyla (2024)
- Website: www.samusicawards.co.za

The South African Music Awards (often simply the SAMAs) are the Recording Industry of South Africa's music industry awards, established in 1995. The ceremony is held in late-April or May every year, with the judging process starting in November of the previous year. The nominations are typically announced at the end of March. The winners receive a gold-plated statuette called a SAMA.

The show is consistently held at the Super Bowl in Sun City, with exception of two years, and broadcast live on national broadcaster, SABC. The ceremony features live performances by a selection of nominees. The SAMAs are considered the South African equivalent of the American Grammy Awards. MTN has been the title sponsor of the event since 2003.

== 1990s ==
1st SAMA (1995): Soweto String Quartet – "Zebra Crossing"	2nd SAMA (1996): Qkumba Zoo – "The Child (Inside)"
3rd SAMA (1997): Revolution – "The Journey"	4th SAMA (1998): Jimmy Dludlu – "Echoes From The Past"
5th SAMA (1999): Tasché – "Tasché"

== 2000s ==
6th SAMA (2000): Gloria Bosman – "Tranquility"	7th SAMA (2001): Selaelo Selota – "Painted Faces"; Loyisa – "Loyiso"; Tsakani Mhinga – "TKO)"; Bambata – "1906"; Kampi Moto and George Phiri – "Acha Masimango"
8th SAMA (2002): Ernie Smith – "Child of Light"	9th SAMA (2003): Moses Khumalo – "Mntungwa"; After Touch – "The African Reaction"; Guy Buttery – "When I Grow Up..."; Jae – "Missing You"; Prince Kupi – "Loxion"
10th SAMA (2004): Adilah – "Ses'fikile"; Gerard Ogle – "Live Your Dream"; Malebo Mothema – "Growth in Africa"; Sliq Angel – "Sliq Angel"; Thando – "Smile upon my Face"	11th SAMA (2005): Simphiwe Dana – "Zandisile"; Jamali – "Jamali"; Pitch Black Afro – "Styling Gel"; Seed – "In the Soil"; Zamajobe – "Ndawo Yami"; Ntando – "Kwantu"; Loyiso – "Ampfield"; Ringo – "Baleka"
12th SAMA (2006): Brickz – "Face-Brick"; Kwani Experience – "Birth of the Mudaland Funk"; Prokid – "Heads And Tales"; Tuks Senganga – "Mafoko A Me"; Wikid – "Anger Management"	13th SAMA (2007): Siphokazi – "Ubuntu Bam"; Lesego – "MyMusic"; Lucas Senyatso – "All of Me"; Maduvha – "Maduvha"; Rae – "Kwenzekile"
14th SAMA (2008): Tasha Baxter – "Colour of Me"; Camagwini – "Zivile"; Molemi – "Amantsi"; Mpumi Dhlamini – "Combined Elements"; Tumi Lane – "No Guarantee"	15th SAMA (2009): Andile Mseleku – "Essence of Joy"; Babu – "Up Roots"; Jody – "Just Gonna Be Me"; The Voice of Angels – "The Voice of Angels Vol. 1"; Zebra & Giraffe – "Collected Memories"

== 2010s ==
16th SAMA (2010): Tshepo Mngoma – "People And Places"; Culoe de Song – "A Giant Leap"; Kyle Shepherd – "Fine ART"; Solly Mahlangu – "Obrigado"; The South African Youth Choir – "Birth of the Sun"	17th SAMA (2011): Locnville – "Sun in My Pocket"; Jay – "Solo"; Kwesta – "Special Rekwest"; Liquideep – "Fabrics of the Heart"; Nomsa Mazwai – "Nomisupa"
18th SAMA (2012): Zahara – "Loliwe"; Lwanda Gogwana Songbook – "Chapter 1"; Mi Casa – "Mi Casa Music"; Shadowclub – "Guns and Money"; Zakwe – "Zakwe"	19th SAMA (2013): Toya Delazy – "Due Drop Deluxe"; Bongeziwe Mabandla – "Umlilo"; Khaya – "For You"; Tailor – "The Dark Horse"; The Muffinz – "Have You Heard?"
20th SAMA (2014): Naima Kay – "Umsebenzi"; Gangs of Ballet – "Yes/No/Grey"; iFANi – "I Believes in Me (1st Quadrant)"; MuzArt – "MuzArt"; Nakhane Touré – "Brave Confusion"	21st SAMA (2015): Cassper Nyovest – "Tsholofelo"; Beatenberg – "The Hanging Gardens of Beatenberg"; Duncan – "Street Government"; Howie Combrink – "Eat It While It's Hot"; Jeremy Loops – "Trading Change"
22nd SAMA (2016): Buyelekhaya – Nathi; Avery – Emtee; 20FIFI – Fifi Cooper; VII – Tresor; Family Values – Riky Rick	23rd SAMA (2017): Amanda Black - Amazulu; Soul Kulture - Ngeliny'ilanga; Babes Wodumo - Gqom Queen Vol. 1; Sketchy Bongo- Unmasked; Nasty C - Bad Hair Extensions
24th SAMA (2018): Rose Gold – Shekhinah; Yellow – Shane Eagle; The New Era Session – Rouge; Blaq Diamond – Blaq Diamond; Songs About You – Thabsie	25th SAMA (2019): Sho Madjozi – Limpopo Champions League; Simmy – Tugela Fairy; Mlindo the Vocalist – Emakhaya; Paxton – This is me; Sun-El Musician – Africa to the World

== 2020s ==
26th SAMA (2020): Ndabo Zulu & Umgidi Ensemble – Queen Nandi: The African; Sbu Noah – A David Kind of Psalm (Live); Ami Faku – Imali; Spha Mdlalose – Indlel’eyekhaya; Symphony Viwe Mkizwana – Tributes	27th SAMA (2021): Bucy Radebe – Spiritual Encounter; Xolly Mncwango – Jesus is Enough; Reign Africa – On the Frontline; BandaBanda & The Crocodiles – Africado; Azana – Ingoma
28th SAMA (2022): Khanyisile Mthethwa – African Bird	29th SAMA (2023): Myztro – Nkwari 2.0; Blakka Yut – Unleashed; Sincerely Anne – To Whom it May Concern; Lloyiso – Seasons; Venom and Shishiliza – Love Is Pain
30th SAMA (2024): Tyla – TYLA; Sykes - Most Wanted; Lwah Ndlunkulu – Imizwa; Die Piesangskille and Johan Balt - Almal Gly; Joliza – Bhacasoul Experience	31th SAMA (2025): Nontokozo Mkhize - Lindiwe
32nd SAMA (2026): Paras “Sibalukhulu” Dlamini
