= Imithandazo =

2023 song by Kabza de Small and Mthunzi

Song by Kabza de Small and Mthunzi featuring DJ Maphorisa, Sizwe Alakine, Young Stunna and Umthakathi Kush

from the album Isimo
- Language: Zulu
- English title: Prayers
- Released: 27 October 2023
- Genre: Amapiano
- Length: 5:51
- Label: Piano Hub; SME Africa
- Songwriters: Sandile Fortune Msimango; Sizwe Moeketsi; Tshepo Michael Makhubela; Njabulo Mthunzi Ndimande
- Producers: Kabelo Motha; Themba Sekowe

Music video
- "Imithandazo (Official music video)" on YouTube

Official audio
- "Imithandazo" on YouTube

"Imithandazo" is an amapiano song by Kabza de Small and Mthunzi from their collaborative studio album Isimo (2023). It was released on 27 October 2023 by Piano Hub under exclusive license from Sony Music Entertainment Africa, it features guest appearances from DJ Maphorisa, Sizwe Alakine, Young Stunna, and Umthakathi Kush with production handled by Kabza de Small and DJ Maphorisa, collectively known as Scorpion Kings.

Despite the song not released as a single, in November 2023 the song was trailing the second longest number one charting song in 2023 "iPlan" on The Official South African Charts. The song eventually surpassed "iPlan" and became number one on both the Official South African Charts, and Billboard South Africa Songs chart in January 2024, and it was rated number one trending song in South Africa by The South African.

== Accolades ==
"Imithandazo" won 3 awards for Song of the Year, Best Collaboration, Best Amapiano at 18th Metro FM Music Awards. In addition the song received nomination for Motsepe Foundation Record of the Year at 30th ceremony of South African Music Awards. In 2025, the song received two nominations for Best Producer, and Best DJ at Trace Awards.

Year	Nominee / work	Award	Result	Ref.
2024	"Imithandazo"	Song of the Year	Won	
2024	"Imithandazo"	Best Collaboration	Won	
2024	"Imithandazo"	Best Amapiano	Won	
2024	"Imithandazo"	Motsepe Foundation Record of the Year	Nominated	
2025	"Imithandazo"	Best DJ	Pending	
2025	"Imithandazo"	Best Producer	Pending	

== Charts ==
Chart performance for "Imithandazo"
Chart (2024)	Peak position
South Africa (RiSA)	1
South Africa (Billboard)	1
