= South African Music Award for Album of the Year =

Album of the Year is considered to be one of the top five accolades of the South African Music Awards (SAMAs), an annual award ceremony coordinated by the Recording Industry of South Africa (RiSA). The recording artist(s) who released the winning album are given a statuette called a SAMA. To be eligible for nomination, an album must have been released by a South African artist in the calendar year before the year of the ceremony. The ceremony is held in April or May, and features live performances by some of the nominees. The event is broadcast on SABC1.

The South African Music Awards were established in 1995, but the "Album of the Year" category was not added until 2007.

The following is a list of artists and albums that won a SAMA in the "Album of the Year" category.

== 2000s ==
13th SAMA (2007): Simphiwe Dana – "The One Love Movement on Bantu Biko Street"; Bheki Khoza – "Getting To Heaven Alive"; DJ Sbu – "Y-lens Vol. 1"; Siphokazi – "Ubuntu Bam"; Vusi Mahlasela – "Naledi Ya Tsela"	14th SAMA (2008): Freshlyground – "Ma'Cheri"; DJ Cleo – "Eskhaleni Phase 4"; HHP – "Acceptance Speech"; Jimmy Dludlu – "Portrait"; Zonke – "Life, Love N Music"
15th SAMA (2009): Lira – "Soul in Mind"; Rhythmic Elements – "The Offering"; 340ml – "Sorry For the Delay"; Chris Chameleon – "Klassieke Chameleon"; Goldfish – "Perceptions of Pacha"

== 2010s ==
16th SAMA (2010): Big Nuz – "Undisputed"; BLK JKS – "After Robots"; Busi Mhlongo – "Amakholwa Believers"; Selaelo Selota – "Lapeng Laka"; Teargas – "Dark Or Blue"	17th SAMA (2011): Liquideep – "Fabrics of the Heart"; Flash Republic – "Killer Moves"; Prime Circle – "Jekyll and Hyde"; Professor – "University Of Kalawa Jazmee"; Zakes Bantwini – "Love, Light & Music"
18th SAMA (2012): Zahara – Loliwe; Ladysmith Black Mambazo – Songs From The Farms; Mi Casa – Mi Casa Music; Zakwe – Zakwe; Zonke – Ina Ethe	19th SAMA (2013): Khuli Chana – "Lost In Time"; Wa Muhle – "B.O.P"; Kelly Khumalo – "The Past, The Present, The Future"; Maleh – "Step Child"; Ntokozo Mbambo – "Filled"; The Muffinz – "Have You Heard?"
20th SAMA (2014): Mafikizolo – "Reunited"; DJ Kent – "The Weekent"; Mi Casa – "Su Casa"; Naima Kay – "Umsebenzi"; Nakhane Touré – "Brave Confusion"	21st SAMA (2015): Beatenberg – "The Hanging Gardens of Beatenberg"; Cassper Nyovest – "Tsholofelo"; K.O. – "Skhanda Republic"; Ringo Madlingozi – "Vulani"; The Soil – "Nostalgic Moments"
22nd SAMA (2016): Pieces of Me – Black Coffee; Francois van Coke – Francois Van Coke; Avery – Emtee; Buyelekhaya – Nathi; VII – Tresor	23rd SAMA (2017): Kwesta - Dakar II; Black Motion - Ya Badimo; Amanda Black - Amazulu; Nasty C - Bad Hair Extensions; Thandiswa - Belede
24th SAMA (2018): Rose Gold – Shekhinah; Beautiful Madness – Tresor; 20 – Mafikizolo; King Zamar – Lady Zamar; Yellow – Shane Eagle	25th SAMA (2019): Sjava – Umqhele; Black Coffee – Music is King; Black Motion – Moya Wa Taola; Vusi Nova – Manyan-nyan; Zonke – L.O.V.E
26th SAMA (2020): Re Mmino - Prince Kaybee; Isphithiphithi – Samthing Soweto; Season, Volume II – We Will Worship; Bongo Riot Di Dancehall Wakanda – Trust Stories; Amanzi Nemifula: Umkhuleko – Sibusiso Mash Mashiloane	27th SAMA (2021): Once Upon A Time in Lockdown – Kabza De Small & DJ Maphorisa (Scorpion Kings); Persistence – Bongo Riot; The Healers: The Last Chapter – Black Motion; I Am the King of Amapiano: Sweet & Dust – Kabza De Small; Back to Love – Junior Taurus
28th SAMA (2022): Chymamusique - Musique; Sun-El Musician - African Electronic Dance Music; Zakes Bantwini - Ghetto King; Brian Temba - It's All You; Mobi Dixon - When House Was House	29th SAMA (2023): Lavish Worship – Ntokozo Mbambo; Mass Country – AKA; SR3 – K.O; Isibuko – Sjava; KOA II Part 1 – Kabza De Small
30th SAMA (2024): Isimo - Kabza De Small, and Mthunzi; TYLA – Tyla; Dali Dali - Daliwonga; Soothe My Soul: Songs from our South African Church – Ladysmith Black Mambazo; Unusual - Xolly Mncwango
