= Khuzani =

South African singer

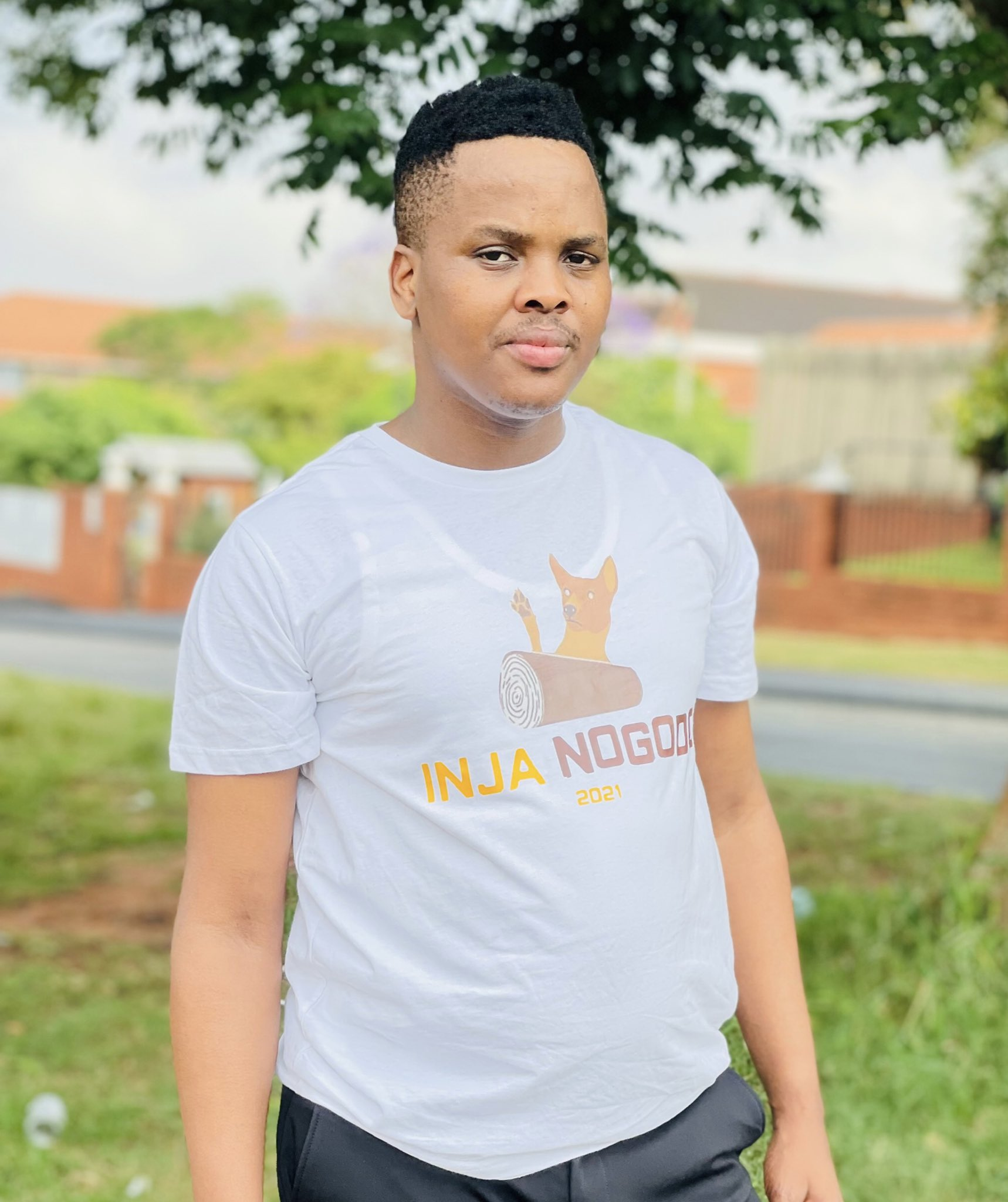
- Khuzani wearing his 2021 album promoting T-shirt

Background information
- Also known as: Ndlam'lenze; Khuba
- Born: Khuzani Nkosikhona Innocent Mpungose; 3 December 1989 (age 36); Cofimvaba, Eastern Cape
- Genres: Maskandi
- Occupation: Singer-songwriter Actor
- Instruments: Vocals; guitar
- Years active: 2009–present
- Labels: Izingane Zoma Production (former); Indlamlenze Group & Production (current)

Khuzani Nkosikhona Innocent Mpungose (born December 3, 1989), professionally known as Khuzani or khuba is a South African singer and businessman. Born and raised in Nkandla, KwaZulu Natal, he rose to prominence after participating in Mgqumeni's posthumous 2010 album iSecret.

== Career ==
Khuzani Nkosikhona Innocent Mpungose was born on December 3, 1989, in Nkandla, KwaZulu-Natal. He matriculated at Sibhakabhaka High School in 2009.

That same year, Mpungose was appointed by Shobeni Khuzwayo to complete the late Mgqumeni's album iSecret.

His debut studio album Bahluleke Bonke was released in 2011. It won Best Selling Album at the Amatshontsho ka Maskandi Awards.

On April 7, 2017, his seventh studio album Isixaxa Samaxoki released. The album was certified gold by the Recording Industry of South Africa (RiSA) two weeks after its release.

In the first quarter of 2019, he participated in the Gcwalisa iMabhida Maskandi Concert.

His single "Ijele" featuring Luve Dubazane was released on November 27, 2020. It won Ukhozi FM Top 10 Song of the Year by 900k votes close to a million votes.

In October 2021, Mpungose performed at the Dubai Expo.

== Honours ==
In April 2021, Mpungose was honoured at the Nkandla Mayoral Awards for his outstanding achievement in the Maskandi genre.

Mpungose was also awarded with Cultural Icon in Maskandi Music Award at the Nelson Mandela Leadership Awards and Diplomatic Summit in Oxford, United Kingdom in September 2026.

== Controversies ==
Khuzani has long disputes with his fellow maskandi artist Mthandeni SK and politician and former radio personality Ngizwe Mchunu.

On 30 September 2023, Khuzani punched influencer Quality Biyela at an event at Settlers Park in Ladysmith.

== Discography ==
=== Studio albums ===
- Bahluleke Bonke (2011)
- Amampunge (2012)
- Sixosha Amambuka (2013)
- Inj'emnyama (2014)
- Isihlahla Samavukane (2015)
- Inyoni Yomthakathi (2016)
- Isixaxa Samaxoki (2017)
- Inhlinini Yoxolo Part 1 (2018)
- Inhlinini Yoxolo Part 2 (2018)
- Inhloko Nes'Xhanti (2019)
- Ispoki Esingafi (2020)
- Inja Nogodo (2021)
- Umqhele nethawula (2022)
- Aliboli Icala (2023)
- Angidlali Nezingane (2024)
- Inhlanhla Izanebhadi (2025)

=== Guest appearances ===
Title	Year	Other artist(s)	Album
"Angimale"	2020	Simmy	Tugela Fairy (Made of Stars)

== Other charted and certified songs ==
List of other charted songs, with selected chart positions and certifications, showing year released and album name
Title	Year	Peak chart positions	Certifications	Album
Title	Year	ZA	Certifications	Album
"Angidlali Nezingane" (Khuzani featuring Thibela)	2024	21		Angidlali Nezingane
"—" denotes a recording that did not chart or was not released in that territory.

== Awards and nominations ==
Awards/Ceremony	Year	Category	Results	Ref.
South African Music Awards	2017	Best Maskandi Album	Won	
Amantshontsho kaMaskandi Awards	2017	Song of the Year	Won	
Amantshontsho kaMaskandi Awards	2017	Best Selling	Won	
Amantshontsho kaMaskandi Awards	2017	Best Album	Won	
KZN Entertainment Awards	2020	KZN's Most Loved	Won	
South African Traditional Music Awards	2021		Won	
South African Music Awards	2023	Best Maskandi Album	Won	
HAPA awards	2025	Best Male Artist (African)	Won	
HAPA awards	2025	Best Independent Artist	Won	
South African Music Awards	2025	Best Maskandi Album	Won	
