= DJ Stokie =

South African DJ

Setoki Mbatha (born February 13, 1983), professionally known as DJ Stokie, is a South African DJ. Born and raised in Mzimhlophe, Soweto, he developed a musical interest at a young age and contested on Mad Half Hour by YFM in 2006.

== Career ==
In 2006, Stokie got his breakthrough as a contestant on Mad Half Hour hosted by YFM.

Amapiano Movement, Vol. 1, was released on December 13, 2019.

His second studio album My Journey was released December 11, 2020. It was supported by two singles "Superman", and "Ubusuku".

My Journey Continues was released on April 7, 2023. The album was certified Gold by the Recording Industry of South Africa (RiSA) with over 18,753 units sold.

His single "Masithokoze", with Eemoh was released on October 20, 2023. The song entered Local Top 100 and International Top 200, debuting at No. 13 and 14 respectively on The Official South African Charts. In addition the song was nominated for Best Song of the Year and Best Amapiano for "Awukhuzeki" at the 18th Metro FM Music Awards.

In early July, announced Stokie as Isgubhu cover star by Apple music. His fourth studio album Immortal, was released on July 11, 2024. It was supported by two singles; "Masithokoze", and "Sthandwa Sami".

Stokie released his fifth studio album Shandu Ka Ndaba on November 20, 2025.

== Discography ==
=== Studio albums ===
- Amapiano Movement, Vol. 1 (2019)
- My Journey (2020)
- My Journey Continues (2023)
- Immortal (2024)
- Shandu Ka Ndaba (2025)

== Other charted and certified songs ==
List of other charted songs, with selected chart positions and certifications, showing year released and album name
Title	Year	Peak chart positions	Certifications	Album
Title	Year	ZA	Certifications	Album
"Selimathunzi" (featuring ZEENHLE and Sobzeen)	2024	10		Immortal
"—" denotes a recording that did not chart or was not released in that territory.

== Awards and nominations ==
=== Metro FM Music Awards ===
Year	Nominee / work	Award	Result
2024	"Masithokoze"	Best Song of the Year	Nominated
2024	"Awukhuzeki"	Best Amapiano	Nominated

=== South African Music Awards ===
Year	Nominee / work	Award	Result	Ref.
2024	"Masithokoze"	Motsepe Foundation Record of the Year	Nominated	
2024	"Awukhuzeki"	Motsepe Foundation Record of the Year	Nominated	
2024	"Awukhuzeki"	RAV Music Video of the Year	Nominated	
