= Mthunzi (singer) =

South African singer-songwriter and producer

- Born: Njabulo Mthunzi Ndimande; 6 December 1992 (age 33); Hammarsdale, KwaZulu-Natal
- Genres: Afro-Pop; Amapiano
- Occupations: Singer; songwriter; producer
- Instruments: Vocals, keyboard
- Label: Universal Music

Njabulo Mthunzi Ndimande (born December 6, 1992) mononymously known as Mthunzi, is a South African singer-songwriter and producer. His debut studio album Selimathunzi was released in 2020.

== Early life ==
Mthunzi was born and raised in Hammersdale, KwaZulu-Natal. His father was a singer and guitarist. He developed musical interest at an early age and began recording in 2008 posting his work on SoundCloud. In February 2019, he relocated to Johannesburg, after he was invited by Sun-El Musician to work on music.

== Career ==
His debut studio album Selimathunzi was released on 24 January 2020. Produced by Sun-El Musician, Claudio × Kenza and Mthunzi himself resulted to a afro-pop record with elements of maskandi, house, and R&B. It was supported by three singles; "Vuka", "Ngibambe La", "Selimathunzi". It earned him his first nomination for Best Afro Pop Album at the 26th ceremony of South African Music Awards. "Baningi" featuring Mlindo the Vocalist was released on 3 December 2021. The song entered Top 50 at number 41 on Local Music Radio Charts.

His collaborative album with Kabza de Small, Isimo, was released on 27 October 2023. At the 18th ceremony of Metro FM Music Awards received the most nominations and won Song of the Year, Best Produced Album, Best Amapiano. In July 2024, he appeared on a collaboration "Kabza Chant" by Kabza de Small featuring Mthunzi, Young Stunna, Nkosazana Daughter, Murumba Pitch, Mashudu, Anzo, Nokwazi and T-Man Xress. The song debuted No. 1 on Local Streaming Chart Top 10 by The Official South African Charts.

== Singles ==
=== As lead artist ===
List of singles as lead artist, with selected chart positions and certifications, showing year released and album name
Title	Year	Peak chart positions	Certifications	Album
Title	Year	ZA	Certifications	Album
"Baningi" (featuring Mlindo the Vocalist)	2021	—		Non-album single
"My My My"	2022	—		Non-album single
"Samatsheketshe" (Trigmatic, Mthunzi)	2022	—		Non-album single
"Estikini" (Group Chat, Mthunzi)	2023	—		Non-album single
"Sifanelene" (Azana, Mthunzi)	2023	—		Igagu
"Oops! (My Darling)" (Group Chat, Mthunzi)	2023	—		Non-album single
"I Need You" (Bantu, Mr Miyagi, Mthunzi featuring Sfundo)	2023	—		Non-album single
"eWallet" (Murumba Pitch, Mthunzi, Omit ST, Buhle Sax)	2024	—		Isidalo
"Ingalo" (Frigid Armadillo, Atmos Blaq, Mthunzi)	2024	—		Non-album single
"Mhlekazi" (TCT, Mthunzi, Mthandazo Gatya)	2024	—		Factory Vault
"Lunganele" (Mac G, EmjayKeyz, Mthunzi, Redash)	2024	—		Non-album single
"Mfana" (Bhubesi, Mthunzi)	2024	—		Non-album single
"Upepe" (Claudio Wade, Mthunzi)	2024	—		Non-album single
"Buya" (Shakes & Les, Mthunzi)	2024	—		Non-album single
"Impi" (Murumba Pitch, Kabza De Small, Mthunzi featuring Phila Dlozi)	2024	—		Impi
"Inkinga" (Frank Mabeat, Mthunzi)	2026	—		Non-album single
"—" denotes a recording that did not chart or was not released in that territory.

=== As featured artist ===
List of singles as featured artist, with selected chart positions and certifications, showing year released and album name
Title	Year	Peak chart positions	Certifications	Album
Title	Year	ZA	Certifications	Album
"Sphesihle" (Thabsie featuring Mthunzi)	2019	—		Non-album single
"Bazokhuluma" (Kelly Khumalo featuring Zakwe and Mthunzi)	2022	—		From a God to a King
"eGoli" (Jessica LM featuring Mthunzi and DJ Khyber)	2023	—		Non-album single
"Kabza Chant" (Kabza De Small featuring Mthunzi, Young Stunna, Nkosazana Daughter, Murumba Pitch, Mashudu, Anzo, Nokwazi and T-Man Xpress)	2024	1		Non-album single
"EBALENI" (James Hadi featuring Mthunzi)	2024	—		Non-album single
"Diwa Kae" (De Mthuda featuring Kabza De Small, Young Stunna, Mkeyz, Mckenzie, Mthunzi)	2024	—		Non-album single
"Ngeke" (Yumbs, Zwayetoven, Mawhoo featuring Mthunzi)	2024	—		Non-album single
"—" denotes a recording that did not chart or was not released in that territory.

=== Other charted and certified songs ===
List of other charted songs, with selected chart positions and certifications, showing year released and album name
Title	Year	Peak chart positions	Certifications	Album
Title	Year	ZA	Certifications	Album
"Imithandazo" (Kabza De Small, Mthunzi featuring Young Stunna, DJ Maphorisa, Sizwe Alakine & Umthakathi Kush)	2023	1		Isimo
"Amazwe" (Kabza De Small featuring MaWhoo)	2023	7		Isimo
"—" denotes a recording that did not chart or was not released in that territory.

=== Songwriting and production credits ===
Year	Title	Artist	Album	Writer or co-writer	Producer or co-producer
2020	"Emadleleni"	S-Tone, Mthunzi, Sino Msolo	Mbabane		check
2020	"Ngiyahamba"	Simmy	Tugela Fairy Made of Stars	check	

== Discography ==
=== Studio albums ===
- Selimathunzi (2020)

=== Collaborative albums ===
- Isimo (with Kabza De Small) (2023)

=== Guest appearances ===
Title	Year	Other artist(s)	Album
"Mamela"	2019	Sino Msolo	Mamela
"Ngiyahamba"	2020	Simmy	Tugela Fairy (Made of Stars)
"Goduka"	2020	Sun-El Musician, Ami Faku	To the World & Beyond
"Amasosha"	2020	Sun-EL Musician, Sino Msolo	To the World & Beyond
"Give Me Light"	2020	S-Tone	Mbabane
"Vroom Vroom"	2020	S-Tone	Mbabane
"Amaphara"	2020	Claudio × Kenza, Sino Msolo	Circles of Life
"Kumnyama"	2021	Zakes Bantwini	Ghetto King
"K' Shubile"	2022	DJ, Vitoto Dee Cee	Afro Nation
"Ithemba Lami"	2022	DJ Bongz, Bongo, Zaba, Sfundo	Road Trip
"Phambili"	2023	Claudio Wade	Winds & Waves
"Moja"	2023	Darque	More Life
"Umdali"	2024	Kelvin Momo, Phila Dlozi, Sykes	Sewe
"Nawe Dali"	2024	Master KG, Nkosazana Daughter, JL SA	Makhelwane
"Love or Hate"	2024	Dlala Thukzin, Oscar Mbo	Finally Famous Too
"Ubuhle"	2024	Mpho.Wav	Book of Wav
"Umlayezo"	2026	Sun-EL Musician, Ami Faku	Under The Sun
"Thatha Inhliziyo"	2026	Mpho.Wav	Into The Deep
"Ngikhumbule"	2026	Frigid Armadillo, Bongi Silinda	The Light

== Awards and nominations ==
=== Metro FM Music Awards ===
Year	Nominee / work	Award	Result	Ref.
2024	"Imithandazo"	Song of the Year	Won	
2024	"Imithandazo"	Best Collaboration	Won	
2024	"Imithandazo"	Best Amapiano	Won	
2024	Isimo	Best Produced Album	Won	

=== South African Music Awards ===
Year	Nominee / work	Award	Result	Ref.
2020	Selimathunzi	Best Afro Pop Album	Nominated	
2024	"Imithandazo"	Motsepe Foundation Record of the Year	Nominated	
2024	"Imithandazo"	Best Collaboration	Nominated	
2024	Isimo	Motsweding FM Best Amapiano Album	Won	
2024	Isimo	Radio 2000 Duo/Group of the Year	Won	
2024	Isimo	SAMPRA Album of the Year	Won	
