= UGatsheni =

South African singer

Mlungisi Khuzani Ndlovu (born 14 April 1990), professionally known as uGatsheni is a South African singer. Born and raised in Pongola, KwaZulu-Natal. His musical career began in 2012 at the age of 22.

His studio album "Inhlupheko" (2021) became commercially successful and certified Platinum by the Recording Industry of South Africa (RiSA).

== Career ==
Mlungisi Khuzani Ndlovu born 1990 in Pongola, KwaZulu-Natal. His professional musical career began at the age of 22, in 2012.

His studio album Inhlupheko was released on January 28, 2022. The album reached Platinum by the Recording Industry of South Africa selling over 20,000 copies.

== Discography ==
=== Studio albums ===
- Isigqila Sengoma (2018)
- Umakhal' esondela (2019)
- Yimi Inkosi (2020)
- Inhlupheko (2021)
- Isiqenqe (2022)
- Uyihlo Nonyoko (2023)
- Unqeqe(2024)
- Izonto Zamahhala (2025)
- Amaphutha (2026)

== Awards and nominations ==
=== South African Music Awards ===
Year	Nominee / work	Award	Result	Ref.
2024	Uyihlo noNyoko	Male Artist of the Year	Won	
2024	Uyihlo noNyoko	Best Maskandi Album	Won	

=== South African Traditional Music Awards ===
Year	Nominee / work	Award	Result	Ref.
2021	"Emendweni"	Song of the Year	Won	
2021	Himself	Best Maskandi Artist	Nominated	
2024	Himself	Best Maskandi (T&D) Artist/Group	Pending	
2024	"Inhlupheko"	Most Voted Song of the Year	Pending	
