= Nomthandazo =

- Gender: Female
- Language: Nguni languages
- Name day: Thursday

Other gender
- Masculine: Mthandazo

Origin
- Meaning: Mother/Woman of prayer

Other names
- Short forms: Thandi, Thandie

Nomthandazo is a feminine given name derived from the Nguni word thandaza, meaning "pray". Shortened familiar versions include Thandi or Thandie.

Notable people with the name include:

- Sonia Nomthandazo Mbele (born 1976), South African actress
- Purity Nomthandazo Malinga (born 1958), Methodist reverend
- Nomthandazo Zuma, South African beauty queen, Miss Durban 2024

== Music ==
- Nomthandazo, 2024 album by Zoë Modiga
- Nomthandazo, 2014 song by Freshlyground
- Nomthandazo, 2024 song by Quintus Dala.
