= Mellow & Sleazy =

South African musical duo

Mellow & Sleazy is a South African duo composed of Phemelo Sefanyetse, and Olebogeng Kwanaite formed in 2020.

"Chipi ke Chipi" with Justin99 was released on April 15, 2022. It debuted number 9 on Local Streaming Chart Top 10.

"Wenza Kanjani" featuring 2woshort, TNK MusiQ, BoontleRSA was released on June 30, 2022. The song was certified Platinum by the Recording Industry of South Africa (RiSA).

Their single "Imnandi lento" with SjavasDaDeejay, TitoM featuring Tman Xpresso was released on August 18, 2023. It debuted number 2 on Local Streaming Chart Top 10.

"Imnandi lento" received two nominations for Best Collaboration, Best Amapiano, and duo nominated for Best Duo/Group at the 18th Metro FM Music Awards.

Their studio album Midnight In Sunnyside 3, was released on April 19, 2024.

== Singles ==
=== As lead artist ===
List of singles as lead artist, with selected chart positions and certifications, showing year released and album name
Title	Year	Peak chart positions	Certifications	Album
Title	Year	ZA	Certifications	Album
"Personal Issues (featuring Twinnie G)	2020	—		
"Midnight"	2020	—		
"Go Deep or Go Home" (featuring DJ Modue K)	2020			
"El Diablo"	2020			
"The Rejects" (featuring S'tukzin Da Djay)	2020	—		
"Ispithipithi" (featuring Vinquet SA, Da Nax)	2020	—		
"Mapara" (featuring Focalistic)	2021	—		
"Polo" (featuring Blaqnick, Master Blaq, Ama Avenger)	2021	—		
"Sghubu sa ko Harvard" (featuring Zan SA)	2021	—		
"Bopha" (Felo Le Tee, Mellow & Sleazy featuring DJ Maphorisa, Madumane, Young Stunna)	2021	1	Platinum	
"Nkao Tempela"	2021	—		
"10111" (featuring M.J, Djy Ma'Ten, Matute Boy)	2021	—	Gold	
"Zwonaka"	2021	—		
"Your Body" (Mellow & Sleazy, Sir Trill featuring DJ Maphorisa)	2022	—		
"Sjepa"	2022	—		
"Salary Salary" (Robot Boii, Mellow & Sleazy featuring ShaunMusiq & Ftears)	2022	79		
"3310" (Focalistic, Mellow & Sleazy)	2022	—		
"Wenza Kanjani" (Mellow & Sleazy, Chley featuring 2woshort, TNK MusiQ & BoontleRSA)	2022	—	Platinum	Barcadi Fest
"Dunusa" (featuring Ceeka Dabula, King Strouck)	2022	—		
"Areyeng" (Dinky Kunene, Mellow & Sleazy)	2022	—		
"Mali (Kumnandi)" (featuring Chley, Musa Keys)	2022	—		
"Bafana Ba Pitori" (SjavasDeejay featuring Chley, Titom, Xduppy & Goodguy Styles)	2022	—		
"Pele Pele" (Ch'cco, Focalistic, Mellow & Sleazy)	2022	—		
"Back2School" (Mellow & Sleazy, DBN Gogo featuring Thabza Tee & LastBorn Diroba)	2022	—		
"Ye Anthem (Mellow & Sleazy Remix)"	2022	—		
"Amasango" (Mellow & Sleazy, TMan Xpress featuring SjavasDaDeejay & TitoM)	2022	—		
"Kwelinye" (featuring Keynote)	2023	—	Gold	
"Thando Kuhle" (TitoM, Mellow & Sleazy featuring Tman Xpress)	2023	—		
"Blue String" (Senjay, Mellow & Sleazy featuring Josiah De Disciple)	2023	—		
"Amini" (Mali B-Flat, Mellow and Sleazy)	2023	—		
"The Magic Violin" (Mali B-Flat, SjavasDeejay, Mellow and Sleazy)	2023	—		
"10 Past 4" (SjavasDeejay, Mellow and Sleazy featuring TitoM, Lastborndiroba)	2023	—		
"Bafunani" (QuayR Musiq, Mellow & Sleazy featuring Lee Mckrazy)	2023	—		
"Al Francisco ii" (Offixl RSA, Mellow & Sleazy featuring King Tone SA, Benzoo, de-papzo)	2023	—		
"Wena Wa Pallwa" (Jimmy Maradona, QwayR, Mello & Sleazy featuring Ch'cco & Leemckrazy)	2023	—		
"Barcadi Fest" (Thutho The Human, Mellow & Sleazy)	2023	—		
"Imnandi lento" (Mellow & Sleazy, SjavasDaDeejay featuring Tman Xpress)	2023	2		Boroko Keng
"Violin Storm" (Mali B-flat, Mellow & Sleazy featuring TitoM, LastBornDiroba)	2023	—		
"MALI YAMINA EKWIN?" (Mulest, Vankay, Mellow & Sleazy featuring Khensani, Bongs Nwana Mhan)	2023	—		
"Spanish Violín" (Mali B-flat, QuayR Musiq, Mellow & Sleazy)	2023	—		
"Kwela" (Kefmaster, Mellow & Sleazy featuring Sxovakonke, Charlie)	2023	—		
"Koti Koti" (Umthakathi Kush, Mellow & Sleazy featuring Sizwe Alakine, Bellinda Chester)	2023	—		
"Ibutho Lomculo" (TitoM, SjavasDeejay, featuring Major League DJz, Tman Xpress, Mashudu)	2023	—		
"Oupa Manyisa" (Blacko, Mellow & Sleazy featuring Leemckrazy, Jayden Lanii, Miano)	2023	—		
"Christmas Present"	2023	—		
"Woza La" (TitoM, SjavasDeejay, Mellow & Sleazy featuring Yuppe, LeeMcKrazy, Krispy K, Ceehle & Mali B-flat)	2023	—		
"Ukhathele" (Mellow & Sleazy, TMan Xpress featuring MashBeatz, MDU aka TRP)	2024	—		
"Saka" (featuring Novatron, Eltee, Leemckrazy, Shuga & Scotts Maphuma)	2024	—		
"Kokotela" (Mellow & Sleazy, featuring Scotts Maphuma & Gipa)	2024	—	Gold	
"Magriza" (The Buu, Mellow & Sleazy featuring Tman Xpress & Mluusician)	2024	—		
"Wednesday (Freestyle)" (Don Tella, OK.Mulaa, Mellow & Sleazy)	2024	—		
"Woza Baba" (Kefmaster, Mellow & Sleazy featuring Thuto The Human, Sxovakonke, M Sibbs & STOUTER)	2024	—		
"Tjaro (Lunar, Makhekhe featuring Jay Music, Al Xapo, Boontle RSA, Nation-365, LK Deepstix)	2024	—		
"Brii X Quantum" (Mootion, Jay Music, Mellow & Sleazy)	2024	—		
"eGoli" (CowBoii, Mellow & Sleazy featuring Eltee & Novatron)	2024	—		
"Sekele" (Black SA, Mellow & Sleazy)	2024	—		Non-album single
"Kshubile (Novatron, Mellow & Sleazy featuring Scotts Maphuma, GoodGuy Styles)	2024	—		Non-album single
"Zase England" (Black SA, Mellow & Sleazy, Scotts Maphuma)	2024	—		Non-album single
"Focus" (Novatron, Carter IV, Mellow & Sleazy featuring Scott Maphuma)	2024	—		Non-album single
"Mkokotlo" (Don Edward, Mellow & Sleazy, Ez Maestro)	2024	—		Non-album single
"JD 27" (Mellow & Sleazy featuring Al Xapo)	2025	—		Non-album single
"—" denotes a recording that did not chart or was not released in that territory.

=== As featured artist ===
List of singles as featured artist, with selected chart positions and certifications, showing year released and album name
Title	Year	Peak chart positions	Certifications	Album
Title	Year	ZA	Certifications	Album
"MaDlamini" (Dooushii, Scotts Maphuma featuring Mellow & Sleazy)	2024	6		
"—" denotes a recording that did not chart or was not released in that territory.

== Discography ==
=== Studio albums ===
- Kwa Kwa (2021)
- Midnight In Sunnyside (2022)
- Barcadi Fest(2022)
- Midnight In Sunnyside 2 (2023)
- Boroko Keng (2023)
- Midnight In Sunnyside 3 (2024)

=== Collaborative albums ===
- The III Wise Men (with Felo Le Tee) (2023)
- Fantastic 4 (with Amu Classic & Kappie) (2025)
- Midnight in Diepkloof (with Tman Xpress) (2025)
- Midnight in Diepkloof Zone2 (with Tman Xpress) (2026)

=== EPs ===
- Umswenko (with Xduppy & Scotts Maphuma) (2024)

Personal information

Born

30 March 2003

Nationality

South African

Occupation

Accounting student, political activist, student leader, philanthropist

Education

Harmony Christian School

Alma mater

Tshwane University of Technology

Known for

Student leadership, activism, Ezaga Must Fall movement

Political involvement

Deputy Chairperson of South African Students Congress Garankuwa branch

Parents

Thembinkosi Abraham Likhuleni and mother (deceased)

Early life and background

Siphosezwe Likhuleni (born 30 March 2003) is a South African student leader, political activist, accounting student, business philanthropist, and advocate for student issues. He was born to Thembinkosi Abraham Likhuleni and his mother, who later passed away.

Likhuleni originates from Mbuzini, a village situated in Nkomazi, South Africa. Although originally from Mbuzini, he spent much of his upbringing in Rustenburg in the North West province, where he developed an interest in leadership and community engagement.

Education

Likhuleni attended Harmony Christian School for his secondary education. He later enrolled at the Tshwane University of Technology, where he pursued studies in accounting.

During his university years, he became actively involved in student development, representation, and campus leadership activities.

Political career and student leadership

Likhuleni entered student politics through the South African Students Congress in Garankuwa and later served as Deputy Chairperson of the branch. His role focused on student representation, advocacy, and engaging in matters affecting student welfare and academic development.

In 2024, he became a member of the Student Parliament at Tshwane University of Technology, where he participated in governance and student affairs initiatives.

Activism

In 2023, Likhuleni emerged as one of the leading activists associated with the Ezaga Must Fall movement, which focused on concerns raised by students and broader university community issues. His involvement increased his visibility in student activism circles.

Philanthropy and business interests

Apart from student politics and activism, Likhuleni has expressed interest in business initiatives and philanthropic activities, while continuing his development as an accounting student.

Personal life

Likhuleni has maintained an interest in leadership, community upliftment, and student empowerment, with a focus on creating opportunities and representing youth voices.
