= Melanie Scholtz =

South African musician (born 1979)

Melanie Alice Scholtz
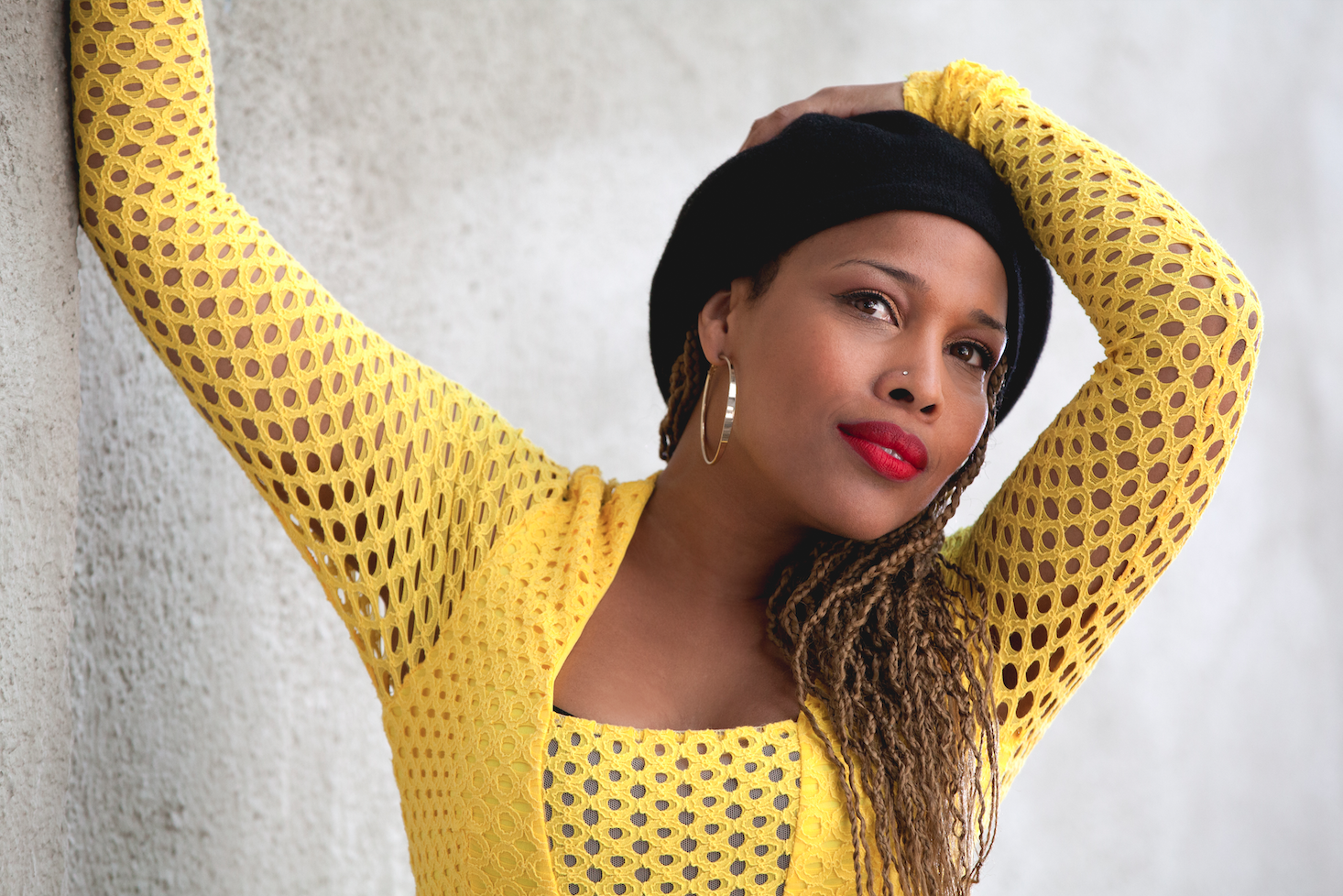

Background information
- Born: February 25, 1979 (age 47); Cape Town, South Africa
- Genres: Jazz; opera; R&B; spoken word
- Occupations: Singer, songwriter, composer, dancer, visual artist
- Instruments: Piano and voice
- Website: www.melaniescholtz.com

Melanie Scholtz is a South African-born jazz singer, songwriter, composer, dancer, and visual artist who has performed with Wynton Marsalis, The Jazz at Lincoln Center Orchestra, and Hugh Masekela.

== Early life ==
Scholtz was born in Cape Town, South Africa, into a musical family. She began classical piano lessons at the age of 5 and at 16 started her formal vocal training with soprano May Abrahams. From 1997 to 2000 Scholtz attended The University of Cape Town where she graduated Cum Laude with a Performers Diploma in opera.

== Career ==
After graduating from the University of Cape Town, Scholtz appeared on the 2001 South African Woman of the Year Awards show. The following year, she returned to the South African Woman of the Year Awards Show with South African Music Award Winner, Mozambican guitarist Jimmy Dludlu, performing their hit single Peaceful Moment, to which Melanie penned the lyrics. In 2002, she won the Best Jazz Vocalist Award at the Old Mutual Jazz Encounters.

Scholtz released her debut album Zillion Miles in 2006. The album was produced by Thor Kvande and recorded at Paris Studios in Cape Town.

In 2010 Scholtz won the prestigious Standard Bank Artist Award. Her sophomore album Connected was produced by Ole Jørn Myklebust with whom Scholtz had previously toured and recorded with. That same year she also released Living Standards, her first endeavor recording traditional jazz material.

Scholtz released Freedom’s Child – Melanie Scholtz sings James Matthews in 2013. This collaboration with dissident, anti -apartheid activist and poet James Mathews was produced by Mark Fransman and features saxophonist Soweto Kinch. The album spans 11 poems of Matthews from various anthologies set to Scholtz’s music. The same year Scholtz released Our Time produced by Bokani Dyer.

Scholtz moved to Czech Republic in 2015 and worked there as a songwriter while freelancing in Europe.

In 2017 Melanie moved to New York City and started working with the Jazz at Lincoln Centre organization as part of outreach workshops highlighting South African and American Jazz. She was featured as part of The Great South African Songbook Tour with Wynton Marsalis and The Jazz at Lincoln Center Orchestra, performing in New York, Chicago, Vienna and South Africa.

== Discography ==
=== Albums as a leader ===
- 2006 – Zillion Miles
- 2010 – Connected
- 2010 – Living Standards
- 2013 – Freedom Child
- 2013 – Our Time

=== Singles ===
- 2005 – Goldfish, "Times May Change You", Caught In The Loop (Mango Music)
- 2015 – Melanie Scholtz, Simple Melody
- 2018 – Gratitude (with Sir LSG), Moving Circles

=== Selected albums ===
- 2001 – Jimmy Dludlu, Afrocentric (Universal Music)
- 2009 – Ivan Mazuze, Maganda
- 2010 – Inkala, Live in Varanger
- 2011 – Sverre Gjørvad, Patience For The Little Things (Reflect)
- 2011 – Marco Miro, Call Love, Muriel
- 2016 – Emilio Marinelli, Trio 4.0
- 2018 – Marco Miro, You Love Me Anyway
- 2018 – Special of the Day, The First Course

== Awards ==
- 2002 – Winner "Best Jazz Vocalist" Old Mutual Jazz Encounters
- 2010 – Standard Bank Artist of the Year Award
- 2012 – Jazz A Juan Revelations Festival in Juan Le Pins, Jury Prize, RTL prize and The Public Prize
