= Proudly South African =

Phrase indicating that a product was produced in South Africa

- Logo

- Formation: 2001; 25 years ago
- Headquarters: 23 Sturdee Avenue, Rosebank, Johannesburg, Gauteng
- Website: www.proudlysa.co.za

Proudly South African was established in 2001, born out of the 1998 Presidential Job Summit which was convened by the late former President Nelson Mandela. The country’s official buy local advocacy campaign is aligned to the government’s objective of combatting the triple challenges of poverty, inequality and above all, unemployment.

Proudly South African is a membership based organisation, and only companies that have been audited and approved are entitled to carry the logo, which is a sign that a product or service meets local content thresholds and above all, quality standards.

Proudly South African works with the public and private sectors to promote increased levels of local procurement through supply chain structures, and with consumers to change habits of every day store and online purchases.

Proudly South African’s clarion call is Buy Local to Create Jobs.

In 2025, Proudly South African announced plans to launch an ecommerce site. The site will be launched in cooperation with the South African Department of Trade, Industry, and Competition.

== See also ==
- Rainbow Nation
