= Luthando Shosha =

South African TV personality

- Born: Luthando Shosha; 9 March 1989 (age 36); Port Elizabeth, Eastern Cape, South Africa
- Other names: Loot Love; King Loot
- Education: Collegiate Girls High School
- Occupations: Radio personality; Television presenter; Model
- Years active: 2009-present
- Partner: Reason (? - 2020)
- Children: 2

Luthando Shosha, also known as Loot Love (born March 9, 1989) is a South African television presenter and radio personality, best known for co-hosting the SABC 1 Friday night music show Live Amp.

== Early life ==
Luthando was born on March 9, 1989, in Port Elizabeth, Eastern Cape. She attended Collegiate Girls High School. After matriculation she went on to study Interior Design at Design School Southern Africa (DSSA) in Johannesburg, Gauteng.

Luthando Shosha was not able to write her final examinations for DSSA because of financial difficulties, she then returned home to Port Elizabeth. She was encouraged by her mother to enter beauty pageants. She eventually entered the beauty pageant and was picked to do promotions for a local company in Port Elizabeth.

== Career ==
Luthando Shosha was recruited by an employee at Kingfisher FM to do a voice over for the radio station. She was invited to an orientation at the station at the radio station for two weeks, towards the end of the orientation a DJ at the station left leaving an opening for Luthando Shosha.

In 2012, Shosha entered the SABC 1 Live Presenter search competition which she won and broke into mainstream South Africa entertainment industry. She debuted on Live Amp on May 18, 2012 besides Television personality Bonang Matheba. She then hosted a music show called the Urban Music Experience which Aired on SABC 1 every Friday evenings. In 2017 she became a host for the MTVshow The Come Up, The same year she was chosen as one of the South African ambassadors for the cosmetic giant Revlon for their live boldly campaign. She also collaborated with Footwork SA for their 2017 winter campaign. She won an award for the most innovative style at the Style awards later in 2017. The same year she hosted the red carpet in London for the MTV European music awards. She has appeared on numerous South African magazines like ElleSA Magazine, True Love, Bona and more..

She currently hosts a hip hop show on Metro FM alongside Dj Speedsta called Absolute Hip Hop every Saturdays.

Shosha became a host of Africa Now Radio on Apple Music 1 in June 2021.

In March 2022, she was announced as the ambassador of Krone Night Nectar campaign.

In April 2024, Shosha was announced as the host of 18th Metro FM Music Awards with ProVerb.
