= Priddy Ugly =

South African rapper (born 1992)

- Born: Ricardo Moloi; April 2, 1992 (age 34); Luanda, Angola
- Genres: Hip-hop music, trap music
- Occupations: Rapper, Record producer
- Instrument: Vocals
- Years active: 2010–present
- Partner: Bontle Modiselle

Ricardo Moloi (born April 2, 1992) better known as Priddy Ugly is a South African rapper and record producer.

== Early life ==
Ricardo Moloi, was born on April 2, 1992 in Luanda, Angola and raised in Meadowlands and Kempton Park, South Africa. His mother, Santa Maria Dumingez, is from Angola while his father, Lebone Moloi, is South African.

Priddy Ugly was actively involved in extra-curricular activities in school and was exceptional. In high school, he was part of the athletics team and because of his talent, he joined Moroka Swallows Academy.

It was during his time at the academy that he joined and competed as a part of South Africa’s National Athletics youth team.

At 15, Priddy Ugly entered the St. Peter’s National Dance Tournament and won the Best Male Dancer award.

== Career ==
The rapper notes that his father introduced him to hip-hop through Tupac’s music and the bug bit.

His dad introduced him to it during a grade 4 school project on the “Black Panther” Black Power African American Civil Rights Movement. Tupac’s parents were part of the movement.

At 15, Priddy Ugly joined Hip Hop dance crew Freeze Flame and they won Strictly Hip Hop and various other competitions.

In 2007, Priddy Ugly joined the Krunk Era, a boy group which was later renamed Blaque. The group was signed to the H.U.G.E Entertainment.

In 2010, after signing to Aviator Management as a solo artist, he released some of his first songs through the agency.

In April 2017, Ugly signed a recording deal with Abitiouz Entertainment.

Following his exit with former label, his studio album G.O.A.T (Glory on Any Territory), was released on November 8, 2019.

His fourth studio album SOIL, was released on July 28, 2021.

His sixth and last studio album Dust (stylized DUST), was released in January 2024. The album surpassed 4 million streams on Spotify within 3 months, became his first album to do so.

Dustwon Best hip-hop album at the 30th ceremony of South African Music Awards.

== Discography ==
=== Studio albums ===
- You Don't Know Me Yet (2016)
- E.G.Y.P.T (2017)
- G.O.A.T (Glory on Any Territory) (2019)
- Soil (2021)
- MUD (2022)
- Dust (2024)

== Singles ==
=== As lead artist ===
List of singles as lead artist, with selected chart positions and certifications, showing year released and album name
Title	Year	Peak chart positions	Certifications	Album
Title	Year	ZA	Certifications	Album
"Hunnids"	2015	—		Non-album single
"My Swing"	2015	—		Non-album single
"Uh Huh" (Priddy Ugly featuring Nadia Nakai)	2019	—		Non-album single
"Lockdown Extended"	2020	—		Non-album single
"A Reminder to You"	2021	—		Non-album single
"Rainbow"	2021	—		Non-album single
"Never Pen Era"	2021	—		Non-album single
"Ntja'ka (Priddy Ugly, Maglera Doe Boy featuring MashBeatz)	2023	—		Dust
"Give Me Life" (Kashcpt, Priddy Ugly, MashBeatz featuring Frank Casino)	2023	—		Non-album single
"Power" (youngseruno, Solo Sae, Priddy Ugly, featuring Saudi)	2024	—		Non-album single
"Gimmicks" (Gr8ful, Priddy Ugly, KindlyNxsh)	2024	—		Non-album single
"—" denotes a recording that did not chart or was not released in that territory.

== Achievements ==
=== South African Music Awards ===
Year	Nominee / work	Award	Result	Ref.
2024	Dust	Best Hip Hop Album	Won	

=== South African Hip Hop Awards ===
Year	Nominee / work	Award	Result	Ref.
2022	"30 Minutes To Soweto"	Best Video	Nominated	
2022	MUD	Mixtape of the Year	Nominated	
2022	Himself	Lyricist of the Year	Won	

== Personal Life ==
Priddy Ugly is married to a dancer and presenter Bontle Modiselle, whom he met in 2009.

They got married in 2019 in an intimate traditional wedding and they have a two-year-old daughter together, Afrika Bonita Lerato Moloi.
