= Mr Thela =

South African record producer and DJ

- Born: Simphiwe Sihawu; Gugulethu, Western Cape, South Africa
- Genres: Gqom; Sgubhu
- Instruments: keyboard, synthesizer
- Years active: 2016–present
- Label: Universal Music Group
- Formerly of: Mshayi & Mr Thela
- Website: mrthela.africa/about-me/

Simphiwe Sihawu (born 2000) better known as Mr Thela, is a South African DJ and music producer. Born in Gugulethu and raised in Samora Machel, Philippi, his professional musical career began in 2016 at the age of 16. Aside from his solo career, Sihawu was a member of Mshayi & Mr Thela duo.

Their debut studio album Make Cape Town Great Again (2020), became their best-selling album, certified Platinum by the Recording Industry of South Africa (RiSA).

His second studio album Tronics Land Series 2, was released on 17 November 2023. The album debuted No. 3 on Apple Music and No. 5 on Spotify South Africa Charts respectively.

In February 2024, Mr Thela signed a recording deal with Universal Music Group.

== Artistry ==
Mr Thela's musical styles encompass gqom, sgubhu and a genre of his own creation alongside Mshayi, gospel gqom (Cape Town gqom).

== Discography ==
=== Mshayi & Mr Thela ===
- Make Cape Town Great Again (2020)
- Make Cape Town Great Again 2.0 (2020)

=== Solo albums ===
- Tronics Land Series 1 (2022)
- Tronics Land Series 2 (2023)
- Tronics Land Series 3 (2024)
- Langa (2025)
- INTSIKA (King Of Gqom) (2026)

== Achievements ==
=== Metro FM Music Awards ===
Year	Nominee / work	Award	Result	Ref.
2024	"Hello"	Best Kwaito/Gqom	Won	
2025	"Ekhaya"	Best Kwaito/Gqom	Won	

=== South African Music Awards ===
Year	Nominee / work	Award	Result	Ref.
2021	Make Cape Town Great Again	Best Gqom Album	Nominated	
2024	Tronics Land Series 2	Best Gqom Album	Nominated	
2026	Langa	Best Gqom Album	Nominated	
