= Naima Kay =

South African singer

- Born: Lungile Khumalo; Port Shepstone, KwaZulu-Natal, South Africa
- Origin: Durban
- Genres: Dance; afro-soul; traditional music
- Occupation: Singer
- Years active: 2009–present
- Labels: Universal Music (former)

Lungile Khumalo professionally known as Naima Kay, is a South African Afro-jazz singer.

== Career ==
Lungile started singing and writing songs in her school choir, and also performed at a local jazz festival. While performing at Ugu Jazz Festival, Port Shepstone, Kay met Mdu Ngcobo and signed her a recording deal with Touch Africa Records.

Her debut studio album Umsebenzi, was released on January 1, 2013. Umsebenzi was nominated for Album of the Year, Best African Adult Album, Female Artist of the Year and won Newcomer of the Year at 20th ceremony of South African Music Award.

Kay received the most nominations for Best African Pop Album, Best Female Artist, Best Newcomer, and Song of the Year at the 13th ceremony of Metro FM Music Awards.

Kay second studio album Ngiyavuma, was released on November 1, 2014. It earned her nominations for Best African Pop Album, Best Remix and won Best Female Album at the 14th ceremony of Metro FM Music Awards.

Kay appeared on collaboration studio album The Duets, released on September 23, 2016.

Her third studio album All About Love, was released on November 11, 2016.

Naima Kay receives consistent radio play with live appearances at national events like the Ugu Jazz Festival and the Durban Jazz festival.

Her single "Imimoya" was released in November 2020.

== Stage name ==
The president of Touch Africa Records, Mdu Ngcobo, gave her an Arabic name Naima Kay meaning "peace and tranquility".

== Discography ==
- Umsebenzi (2013)
- Ngiyavuma (2014)
- All About Love (2016)

== Singles ==
=== As lead artist ===
List of singles as lead artist, with selected chart positions and certifications, showing year released and album name
Title	Year	Peak chart positions	Certifications	Album
Title	Year	ZA	Certifications	Album
"Umsebenzi"	2013	—		Umsebenzi
"Lelilanga (Remix)"	2013	—		Umsebenzi
"Lelilanga"	2013	—		Umsebenzi
"Soka Lami"	2019	—		Non-album single
"Sondela Baby"	2019	—		Non-album single
"Imimoya"	2020	—		Non-album single
"Umlilo" (featuring Kelly Khumalo)	2021	—		Non-album single
"Uyisithandwa Sami"	2023	—		Non-album single
"Wamshiy'untombazene" (featuring Ola Sax)	2023	—		Non-album single
"—" denotes a recording that did not chart or was not released in that territory.

== Awards and nominations ==
=== Metro FM Music Awards ===
Year	Nominee / work	Award	Result	Ref.
2014	Umsebenzi	Best African Pop Album	Nominated	
2014	Umsebenzi	Best Female Artist	Nominated	
2014	Umsebenzi	Best Newcomer	Nominated	
2014	Umsebenzi	Song of the Year	Nominated	
2015	Ngiyavuma	Best African Pop Album	Nominated	
2015	Ngiyavuma	Best Female Album	Won	
2015	"Ngiyavuma"	Best Remix	Nominated	

=== South African Music Awards ===
Year	Nominee / work	Award	Result	Ref.
2014	Umsebenzi	Best Newcomer	Won	
2014	Umsebenzi	Album of the Year	Nominated	
2014	Umsebenzi	Best African Adult Album	Nominated	
2014	Umsebenzi	Female Artist of the Year	Nominated	
