= Soa Mattrix =

South African DJ and Music Producer

Mandla Mashakeni, professionally known as Soa Mattrix is a South African DJ and music producer. Born and raised in Soweto, Mattrix musical interest began at the age of 10 in 2008.

Soa rose to prominent through his single "Uthando" (2020) featuring Soulful G and Shaun, which became commercially successful. The song was certified double Platinum in South Africa.

His collaborative studio album Tintswalo (2021), was certified Gold by the Recording Industry of South Africa (RiSA).

== Discography ==
=== Studio albums ===
- Sounds of Africa (2021)
- Akani (2024)

=== Collaborative albums ===
- Tintswalo (2021) (with DJ Maphorisa)

== Singles ==
=== As lead artist ===
List of singles as lead artist, with selected chart positions and certifications, showing year released and album name
Title	Year	Peak chart positions	Certifications	Album
Title	Year	ZA	Certifications	Album
"Uthando" (featuring Soulful G and Shaun)	2020	—	2× Platinum	
"Inhloso" (Emotionz DJ, Soa Mattrix featuring Murumba Pitch, Happy Jazzman)	2022	—		
"Mina Nawe" (featuring Mashudu, Emotionz DJ, Happy Jazzman)	2022	1	RiSA: 2× Platinum	
"Thandaumntu" (Bassie, Soa Mattrix featuring Happy Jazzman)	2023	—		
"Athandwe" (Soa Mattrix, Sir Trill featuring Beekay, Cnethemba Gonelo, Frank Mabeats, Tribal Soul)	2023	—		
"Nguwe" (DJ Stoks, Soa Mattrix, Happy Jazzman featuring Nandi Ndathane)	2024	—		Non-album single
"Luimbo" (Vic_typhoon, Soa Mattrix featuring Zee_nhle)	2024	—		Non-album single
"Deep Space" (King D, Shaun101, Soa Matrrix)	2024	—		Non-album single
"Africa" (Juliet Ariel, Soa Matrrix)	2024	—		Non-album single
"Taximan" (Tonton Lusambo, Soa Mattrix featuring DJ ANUNNAKI)	2024	—		Non-album single
"—" denotes a recording that did not chart or was not released in that territory.

== Achievements ==
=== South African Music Awards ===
Year	Nominee / work	Award	Result	Ref.
2024	"Mina Nawe"	RAV Music Video of the Year	Pending	

=== South African Amapiano Music Awards ===
Year	Nominee / work	Award	Result	Ref.
2021	"Uthando" featuring Soulful G, Shaun	Song of the Year	Nominated	
2023	"Mina Nawe" featuring Mashudu, Emotionz DJ	Song of the Year	Cancelled	
2023	Himself	Best Music Producer	Cancelled	

=== Lesotho Music Awards ===
Year	Nominee / work	Award	Result
2023	Himself	Best International Act	Pending
