= 18th Metro FM Music Awards =

2024 South African music awards

Metro FM Music Awards
- 18th annual Metro FM Music Awards
- Sponsored by: Metro FM
- Date: April 27, 2024; 2 years ago
- Venue: Mbombela Stadium, Mpumalanga
- Country: South Africa
- Hosted by: Luthando Shosha; ProVerb
- Motto: Black to the Future

Highlights
- Most awards: Kabza De Small (4)
- Most nominations: Tyla (6)
- Song of the Year: "Imithandazo"

Television/radio coverage
- Network: SABC1

The 2024 Metro FM Music Awards is the 18th annual ceremony of the Metro FM Music Awards, the ceremony was aired live on SABC1 and hosted by ProVerb and LootLove on April 27, 2024, at Mbombela Stadium in Mbombela, Mpumalanga, South Africa.

Tyla leads with six nominations ahead of Kabza De Small and Tyler ICU with five each.

== Background ==
Loot Love and ProVerb was announced as hosts of 18th Metro FM Music Awards.

== Winners and nominees ==
Below is the full list of nominees. Winners are listed first highlighted in Bold face.

Best Gospel Album	Best Jazz Album
**Ntokozo Mbambo - Lavish Worship**; Jumbo – Siyabonga; Hle - Take Heart	**Amandla Freedom Ensemble - Oratorio Of A Forgotten Youth**; Sibusiso Mash Mashiloane – Izibongo; Mbuso Khoza - Ifa Lomkhono; Bokani Dyer - Radio Sechaba; Vusi Mahlasela – Umoya: Embracing The Human Spirit
Best Produced Album	Best Collaboration
**Kabza De Small & Mthunzi – Isimo**; De Mthuda & Da Muziqal Chef – Sgudi Snyc; Dlala Thukzin - Permanent Music 3; Inkabi Zezwe – Ukhamba; Kelvin Momo – Kurhula	**Kabza De Small & Mthunzi – "Imithandazo" ft. DJ Maphorisa, Young Stunna, Sizwe Alakine, Umthakathi Kush**; DJ Kent - Horns in the Sun (Thakzin remix) ft Thakzin; Brenden Praise; Mo-T; Mörda; Inkabi Zezwe – "Umbayimbayi"; Tyler ICU – "Mnike" ft. Tumelo ZA, Dj Maphorisa, Nandipha808, CeekaRSA, Tyrondee; Mellow & Sleazy - "Imnandi Lento" ft. Tman Press, SjavasDaDj, TitoM
Song of the Year	Artist of the Year
**Kabza De Small & Mthunzi – "Imithandazo" ft. DJ Maphorisa: Young Stunna, Sizwe Alakine, Umthakathi Kush**; Oscar Mbo & KG Smallz - Yes God ft. Dearson, Mörda, Mhaw keys (Mhaw keys remix); DJ KENT - Horns in the Sun ft Mo-T; Brenden Praise; Mörda; Thakzin (Thakzin remix); Kamo Mphela – "Dalie" ft Baby S.O.N, Tyler ICU & Khalil Harrison; Tyla – "Water"; Dlala Thukzin – "iPlan" ft Zaba & Sykes; Tyler ICU – "Mnike" feat DJ Maphorisa, Nandipha808, CeekaRSA, Tyrondee; Bassie & Aymos - "Izenzo" ft. T-Man SA; De Mthuda & Da Muziqal Chef - "Sgudi Snyc" ft. Eemoh & Sipho Magudulela; DJ Stokie – "Masithokoze" ft. Eemoh	**Lwah Ndlunkulu**; Tyla; Oscar Mbo; Tyler ICU; Mörda
Best Viral Challenge	Best New Artist
**TitoM & Yuppe - "Tshwala Bam" ft. S.N.E & EeQue**; Tyler ICU – "Mnike" ft. Tumelo ZA, Dj Maphorisa, Nandipha808, CeekaRSA, Tyrondee; Tyla – "Water"; Kamo Mphela – "Dalie" ft. Baby S.O.N, Tyler ICU & Khalil Harrison; Tebza De Dj - "Ka Valungu" ft. DJ Nomza The King	**Nontokozo Mkhize**; Harry Cane; Sykes; Robin Fassie; Shakes & Les
Best Duo/Group	Best Dance
**Thee Legacy**; De Mthuda & Da Muziqal Chef; Inkabi Zezwe; Mellow & Sleazy; Tito M & Yuppe	**Zakes Bantwini - "Mama Thula" ft. Skye Wanda, Thakzin & Suffocate SA**; DJ KENT - "Horns in the Sun" ft. Mo-T; Brenden Praise; Morda; Thakzin (Thakzin remix); Dlala Thukzin – "iPlan" ft Zaba & Sykes; Heavy-K – "Ulele" ft. Samthing Soweto, Thakzin & Professor; Mörda - "Burning Bush" ft. Thakzin & Ihhashi Elimhlophe
Best Kwaito/Gqom	Best Hip Hop
**DJ Kotin - "Hello" ft. Big Nuz, Mshayi & Mr Thela**; DJ Lag & Mr Nation Thingz - "Hade Boss" ft. K.C Driller; SYKES - "Sisestyleni Babies" ft. Skillz & RudeBoyz	**A-Reece - "Ving Rhames"**; Cassper Nyovest – "018" ft. Maglera Doe Boy; Nasty C - "Prosper In Peace" ft. Benny The Butcher; Khuli Chana – "Khuliyano"; DA Les – "Solo" ft Manu World Star, Gemini Major, & NAVIO
Best African Pop	Best Amapiano
**Bongeziwe Mabandla – Amaxesha**; Inkabi Zezwe – Ukhamba; Lwah Ndlunkulu – Imizwa; Nomfundo Moh – Ugcobo; Zonke – Embo	**Kabza De Small & Mthunzi - "Imithandazo" ft. DJ Maphorisa; Young Stunna, Sizwe Alakine, Umthakathi Kush**; De Mthuda & Da Muziqal Chef - "Sgudi Snyc" ft. Eemoh & Sipho Magudulela; Mellow & Sleazy - "Imnandi Lento" ft. Tman Xpress; SjavasDaDj; TitoM; Tyler ICU – "Mnike" ft. Tumelo ZA, DJ Maphorisa, Nandipha808, CeekaRSA, Tyrondee; DJ Stokie - "Awu khuzeki" ft. Omit ST, Sobzeen, Zee_nhle
Best Music Video	Best Male
**Bassie & Aymos- Izenzo Ft. T-Man SA**; De Mthuda & Da Muziqal Chef - Sgudi Snyc ft Eemoh & Sipho Magudulela; Tyla – Water; Kamo Mphela – Dalie ft. Baby S.O.N, Tyler ICU & Khalil Harrison; Mthandazo Gatya - IN 2 U	**Aymos**; De Mthuda; Kelvin Momo; Mörda; Kabza De Small
Best Styled	Best R&B
**Oscar Mbo**; Zakes Bantwini; Mörda; DBN Gogo; Musa Keys	**Mthandazo Gatya - "IN 2 U"**; Filah Lah Lah - "Call Me"; Nanette & Blxckie - "Talk 2 Me" ft. BGRZ; Tyla – "Water"; Nontokozo Mkhize - "Lu Strong" ft. Nomfundo Moh
Best Female
**Makhadzi**; Kamo Mphela; Ntokozo Mbambo; Tyla; Lwah Ndlunkulu

== Special awards ==
- Global Icon Award - Tyla
- Lifetime Achievement Award - Oskido
- Lifetime Achievement Award - Boom Shaka
