= Bongeziwe Mabandla =

South African musician

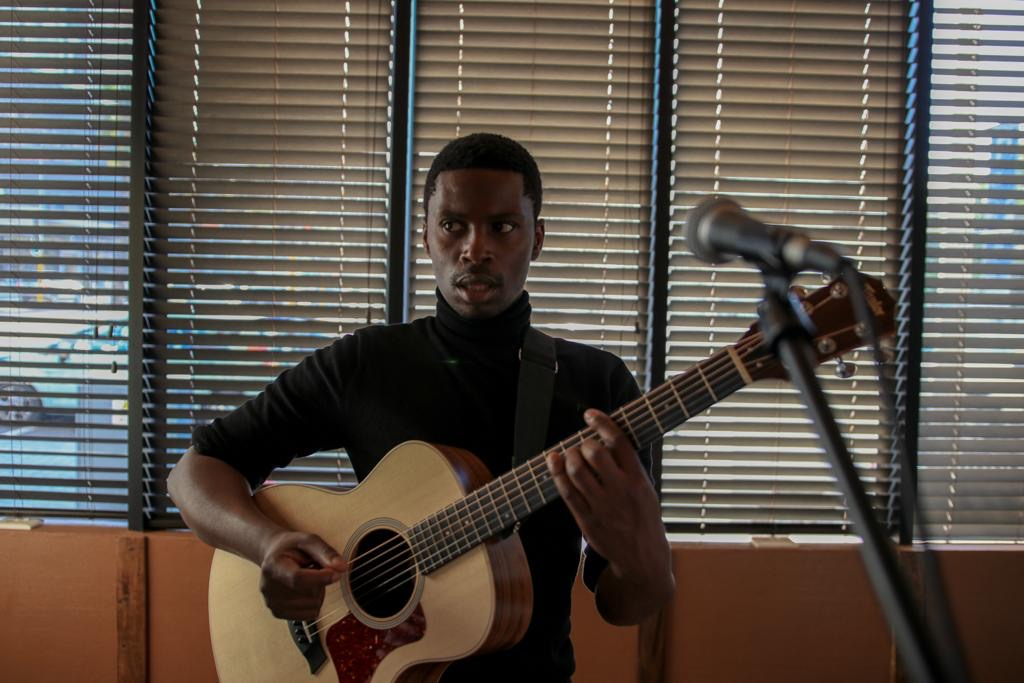
- Mabandla performing in Cape Town, 2019

Background information
- Origin: Tsolo, Eastern Cape, South Africa
- Genres: Electronic folk
- Occupation: Singer-songwriter
- Instruments: Vocals, guitar
- Years active: 2010–present
- Labels: Platoon; Universal Music Group

Bongeziwe Mabandla is a South African musician based in Johannesburg, predominantly playing folk music with lyrics in isiXhosa, accompanied by a guitar.

== Early life ==
Mabandla grew up in the rural Eastern Cape, in a small town called Tsolo. He grew up singing in church and music was a part of his home and school life. He was educated at the Lady Grey Arts Academy, and later moved to Johannesburg to continue his studies at AFDA, The School for the Creative Economy, where he explored an expression of musical storytelling.

== Career ==
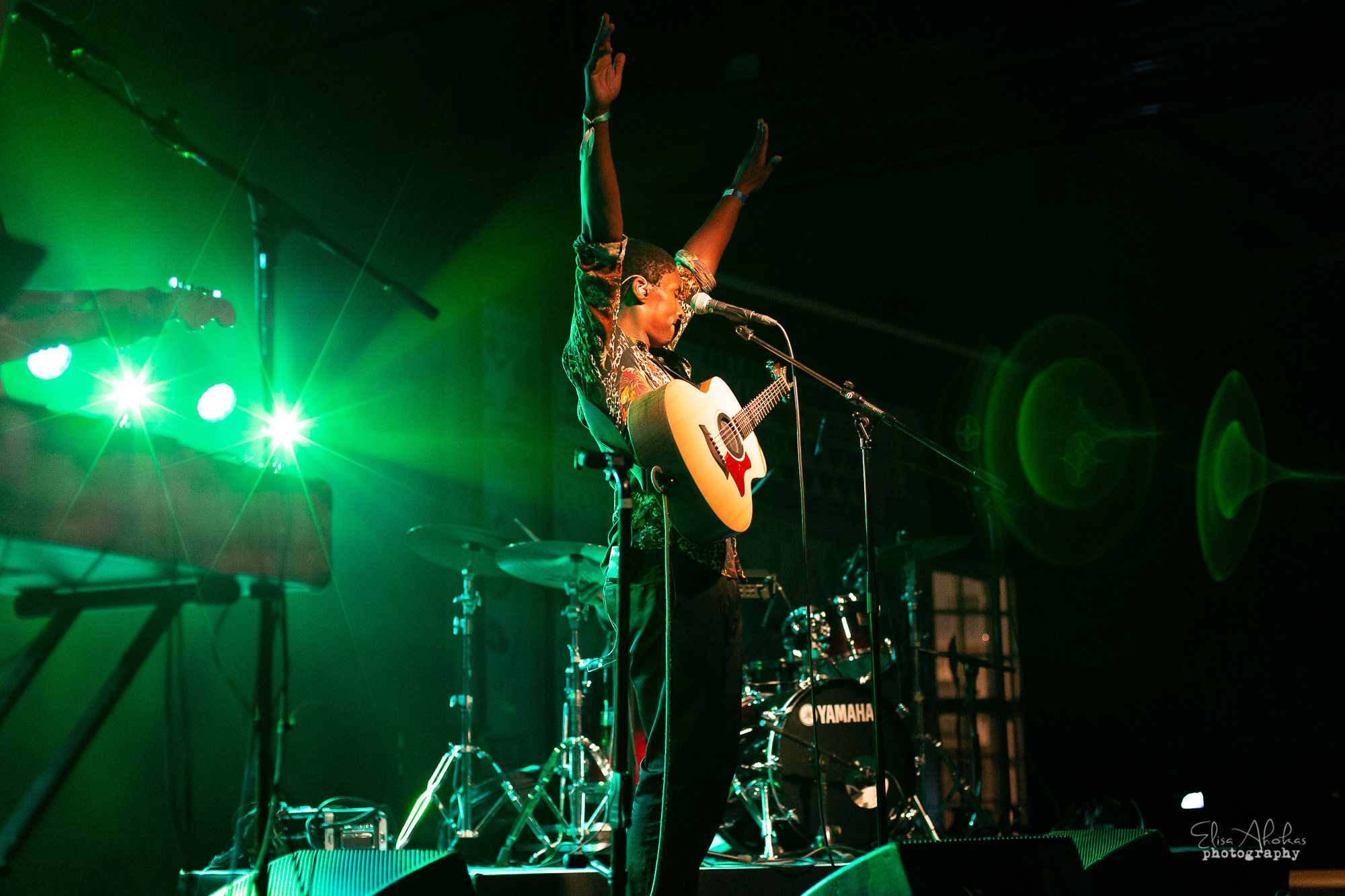
Mabandla performing at WOMEX in 2019.

Recorded in 2012, Mabandla's debut album, Umlilo, caught the attention of Radio France Internationale Discoveries Awards, where he was named one of the Top 10 finalists in 2011. His second album, Mangaliso, was released in 2017 and expanded from the traditional Afro-Folk sound that Mabandla had become known for. With far more significant reach, the album earned Mabandla a SAMA (South African Music Awards) nomination for 2018 Best Alternative Album. The music video for the single "Bawo Bam" featured Spoek Mathambo, and received awards at the 2018 Capital City Black Film Awards and at the 2019 Jozi Film Fest. Since the release of these two albums, Mabandla has performed on stages and at festivals across the world. This includes Reeperbahn Festival, WOMEX and Lake of Stars Festival Malawi.

His third studio album, iiMini, was released on 27 March 2020. The album was supported by two singles "Zange" and "Jikeleza".

At the 27th South African Music Awards, Mabandla was nominated for Remix of the Year ("Sala Nabani" - Sun-El Musician & Claudio × Kenza) and won Best Alternative Album.

"Ukuthanda Wena" was released on April 3, 2023, as album's lead single.

Towards the end of April, Mabandla announced his fourth studio album amaXesha. The album was released on May 5, 2023.

Produced by Tiago Correia-Paulo, amaXesha is xhosa soul genre with elements of Afro-folk, electronic music, contemporary soul, and soft teenage rock. It won Best African Pop at the 18th Metro FM Music Awards.

In April 2023, Mabandla announced his European tour which includes 9 dates, commenced in Hamburg, Germany, on 21 May and will conclude in Mühle Hunziken, Rubigen, Switzerland on 6 August.

Towards the end of October 2024, Mabandla announced amaXesha tour which includes 10 date. The tour is scheduled to commence on November 15 in The Factory, Cape Town and conclude in Wits Linder Auditorium, Johannesburg on November 30.

== Discography ==
- Umlilo (2012)
- Mangaliso (2017)
- iiMini (2020)
- AmaXesha(2023)
- Ndingubani (2026)

== Singles ==
=== Yise (feat. Synapson) ===
In the song, Mabandla paints a picture of the hardships of growing up without his father and how it has made him a stronger person.

"The song looks at the effect that growing up without a father has had on my life. It is a constant journey of understanding the impact that this has had on my journey and I am thankful to have had a chance to explore it on this track. This song is super strong and very personal." —Bongeziwe Mabandla

== Tours ==
=== Mangaliso Tour (2018) ===
Date	Event	City
22 September 2018	Festival Boreal	Canarias, Spain
28 September 2018	It's Personal: With Bongeziwe Mabandla	Soweto, Johannesburg
17 October 2018	MaMA Festival and Convention	Paris, France
18 October 2018	Le Pediluve	Chatenay Malabry, France
20 October 2018	Le VIP	Saint-Nazaire, France
21 October 2018	6 PAR 4	Laval, France
24 October 2018	Bongeziwe Mabandla with Nakhane	Paloma, France
26 October 2018	La Péniche	Chalon Sur Saône, France
27 October 2018	La Chabada	Angers, France

=== iiMini Tour (2020) ===
Due to the COVID-19 pandemic, this tour was postponed indefinitely.

== Achievements ==
=== South African Music Awards ===
Year	Nominee / work	Award	Result	Ref.
2024	AmaXesha	Ikwekwezi FM Best African Adult Contemporary Album	Nominated	
2024	"Sisahleleleni (Ntokzin remix)"	Remix of the Year	Nominated	
