= Mthandeni SK =

South African singer-songwriter

- Born: 24 April 1988 (age 38); Mtubatuba, KwaZulu-Natal
- Other names: Igcokama Elisha , Indlabeyiphika , king Duyaza
- Notable work: Amagolide, I Thousand, Idogstyle, Amakhothangqoko, "Paris", Impisi Iyalaya, "ISkhova sikazwelonke"
- Website: https://www.facebook.com/mthandeni.manqele.104

Mthandeni Sibusiso Manqele (born 24 April 1988). professionally known as Mthandeni SK or Igcokama Elisha, is a South African musician, a Maskandi singer, and songwriter. He is regarded by many as the King of Maskandi, having a cult-like following that transcends people of different cultural backgrounds.

"Paris", featuring Lwah Ndlunkulu, was released on 9 August 2023. The song was commercially successful and was certified multi-platinum by the Recording Industry of South Africa (RiSA). In addition, the song won Motsepe Foundation Record of the Year at the 30th South African Music Awards. He became a pioneer in the woolies sub-genre of Maskandi by featuring a female musician outside of this genre. He later on featured Mawhoo on “Gucci” which also became a hit single.

His single "Gucci", featuring MaWhoo, was released on 27 September 2024. The song entered International Top 200 and SA Top 10 charts at number 1 for three consecutive weeks. The song has amassed over 20 million streams on Spotify, being his second most streamed song after “Paris” with over 28 million streams. His third most streamed song is “Sigade Umzila” with over 15 million streams on Spotify. Additionally, “Gucci” was the first Maskandi song to get a million views on youtube within 24 hours, making history.

In 2025, he released another hit song by the title “Dubai” with fellow artist, Mawhoo. With this single, he further established his dominance as the biggest Maskandi artist, especially in the Woolies sub-genre.

During the same year(2025), he tried to release an album but he couldn’t due to label issues. He alleges that the bigger recording companies want to sign him but he refuses hence resorting to blocking the release of his music.

Mthandeni SK inspired the creation of female music powerhouse duo of MaWhoo and Lwah Ndlunkulu called Zulu Queens. He previously collaborated with them separately on hit singles “Dubai” and “Paris” respectively. The duo have a song with the Mthandeni called “Woolies” on their debut album(Isithembu) - inspired by the sub-genre of Maskandi which he came up with.

== Discography ==
=== Studio albums ===
- Sibiza abadlwane (2013)
- The activist and Umthwalo Womona (2014)
- Xenophobia and Angifuni lutho (2015)
- Festive season and Amagolide (2016)
- I Thousand and Ozankosi (2017)
- Ithuna ledixa and Ubisi (2018)
- Idog style and Iskorokoro sami (2019)
- Imfolomane (2020)
- Amavolovolo (2021)
- Is'khova sikazwelonke and I-Blow Job (2022)
- Amakhothangqoko (2023)
- Sigade umzila (2024)
- Easy Target (2026)

=== Extended Plays ===
- Front Seat (2025)

Singles

- "Paris" (2023)
- "Gucci" (2024)
- "Ishephisi Ejezini" (2024)
- ”Gcina Ngci!” (2025)
- “Dubai” (2025)
- “Africa Unite - World Cup Song” (2026)

== Achievements ==
=== South African Music Awards: Record of the Year 2023 ===
Year	Nominee / work	Award	Result	Ref.
2020	”Amageja”	Ukhozi FM: Song of the Year	Runner-up	
2023	”Paris”	Ukhozi FM: Song of the Year	Runner Up	
2024	"Paris"	Motsepe Foundation Record of the Year	Won	
2024	”Gucci”	Ukhozi FM: Song of the Year	Won	
2025	”Gucci”	Record of the Year	Won	
2025	”Gucci”	Music Video of the Year	Won	Won
