= IPlan =

2023 song by Dlala Thukzin

"iPlan"

Song by Dlala Thukzin featuring Zaba and Sykes

from the EP Permanent Music 3
- Language: Zulu language
- English title: Plan
- Released: 15 September 2023
- Recorded: 2022
- Genre: Gqom; Afro Tech; Dance
- Length: 6:50
- Label: Dlala Records
- Songwriter(s): Ayabonga Zuma; Thuthuka Zindlovu; Wonder Zama Mngwengwe
- Producer(s): Dlala Thukzin

Music video
- "iPlan" (Official music video) on YouTube

Official audio
- iPlan (Official audio) on YouTube

"iPlan" is a song by South African DJ and record producer Dlala Thukzin taken from his extended play (EP) Permanent Music 3 (2023). It was released on 15 September 2023 and features guest appearances from frequent collaborator Zaba, and Sykes.

The song surpassed 2 million streams on Spotify in two weeks, peaked at number one on Billboard South Africa songs, and Local & International Streaming Charts Top 10 of The Official South African Charts (RiSA). "iPlan" was certified 2× Platinum in South Africa.

== Awards ==
The song received nominations for Motsepe Foundation Record of the Year and RAV Music Video of the Year at 30th ceremony of South African Music Awards. In addition, the song earned a nomination for Song of the Year at DStv Content Creator Awards in 2024.

Year	Nominee / work	Award	Result	Ref.
2024	"iPlan"	RAV Music Video of the Year	Nominated	
2024	"iPlan"	Motsepe Foundation Record of the Year	Nominated	
2024	"iPlan"	Song of the Year	Nominated	

== Charts ==
Chart performance for "iPlan"
Chart (2023)	Peak position
South Africa (Billboard)	1
South Africa (TOSAC)	1
South African Airplay (TOSAC)	2
