= Murdah Bongz =

South African DJ and producer

Mörda
- Also known as: Mörda; Murdah Bongz
- Born: Bongani Mohosana; 9 June 1987 (age 39); Pretoria, South Africa
- Genres: House; dance; Afro house
- Occupations: Record producer; DJ
- Instruments: Piano; keyboard; vocals
- Years active: 2009–present
- Label: Asante Music
- Formerly of: Black Motion
- Spouse: DJ Zinhle

Bongani Mohosana (born 9 June 1987) known professionally as Mörda or Murdah Bongz, is a South African DJ and music producer. He is best known for being a former member of the band Black Motion.

== Early life and career ==
Bongani Mohosana was born on the 9th of June 1987 in Pretoria, South Africa. He developed a passion and interest in music at a young age. He joined the church choir, where he learnt how to play musical instruments and was also involved in singing. He then developed his skills as a music composer, dancer and vocalist.

In 2009, Bongani Mohosana along with Thabo Mabogwane aka Smol launched a band named Black Motion and he adopted the stage name Murdah Bongz. The duo started making music and became popular in the year 2011 after releasing their studio album Talking to the Drums. Several years after the band's founding, though, both decided to pursue solo careers. Murdah Bongz then changed his stage name to Mörda.

In 2022, he released his first solo debut album, Asante, which was named after his daughter.

In September 2023, Mörda announced his second studio album Asante II, which was released on 29 September 2023.

"Burning Bush" with Thakzin, Ihhashi Elimhlophe was released on 8 September 2023 as the album's lead single.

The album was released on 29 September 2023.

Mörda's extended play CR4ZY, was released on June 7, 2024. It features Brenden Praise, Lusanda, Mpho.Wav and Kwamzy.

Mörda appeared on a single "Takala", collaboration with Black Motion, DJ Bucks, and African Roots released on May 10, 2024. The song entered Local Radio Chart Top 10 at number 10.

Towards the end of September 2024, Mörda will embark on upcoming Red Bull Unlocked to be held in Cape Town.

== Endorsement ==
In early September 2024, Mörda was announced as Miller brand ambassador.

== Controversy ==
In December 2022, it was alleged that Mörda had taken recording studio equipment from the Black Motion business premises in December 2022. He was also accused of violently damaging a door at the recording studio, among other properties.

Following the accusations, Mörda's legal representatives issued a statement stating that the equipment belongs to Spirit Motion which both Morda and Thabo Smol proportionately owned.

== Personal life ==
Bongani Mohosana married DJ and producer DJ Zinhle in 2022. The couple went public with their relationship in 2021, after reports revealed that they had been dating for quite some time in private before going public. The couple had their first baby daughter, Asante in September 2021. outside Bongani and Zinhle's relationship, Bongani also has a son born in 2006.

== Discography ==
=== Studio albums ===
- Asante (2022)
- Asante II (2023)
- Asante III (2025)

=== Extended plays ===
- CR4ZY (2024)

=== As lead artist ===
List of singles as lead artist, with selected chart positions and certifications, showing year released and album name
Title	Year	Peak chart positions	Certifications	Album
Title	Year	ZA	Certifications	Album
"Summer Love" (featuring Nkosazana Daughter)	2022	—	RiSA: Gold	Asante
"Mohigan Sun" (Mörda, Oscar Mbo featuring Murumba Pitch)	2022	1	RiSA: 2× Platinum	Asante
"Takala" (Black Motion, Afrikan Roots, Dj Buckz, Mörda)	2024	10		Non-album single
"Uxolo" (Kay-9ine, Mörda featuring Zeh SA)	2024	—		Non-album single
"Street Fighter" (T-Deep, Mörda)	2026	—		Non-album single
"—" denotes a recording that did not chart or was not released in that territory.

=== Guest appearances ===
Title	Year	Other artist(s)	Album
"Utlwa"	Thakzin, Xelimpilo	2025	Gods Window, Pt. 1
"Water"	Thakzin, Osaze, Lyrix Shoxen	2025	Gods Window, Pt. 1
"Galela"	Thakzin, Leko M	2025	Gods Window, Pt. 1

== Awards and nominations ==
=== GQ Best Dressed Awards ===
Year	Nominee / work	Award	Result	Ref.
2024	Himself	Best Dressed Editor's Choice	Won	

=== Grammy Awards ===
Year	Nominee / work	Award	Result	Ref.
2024	"The Color Purple"	Best compilation soundtrack for visual media	Nominated	

=== Metro FM Music Awards ===
Year	Nominee / work	Award	Result	Ref.
2025	Himself	Best Styled Artist	Won	
2025	Himself	Best Male Artist	Nominated	
2025	Himself	Best Artist of the Year	Nominated	

=== NAACP Awards ===
Year	Nominee / work	Award	Result	Ref.
2024	The Color Purple soundtrack	Outstanding Soundtrack/Album Compilation	Won	

=== South African Dance Music Awards ===
Year	Nominee / work	Award	Result	Ref.
2023	Asante	Best Dance Album	Nominated	
2023	"Mohigan Sun" featuring Oscar Mbo, Murumba Pitch	Best House Record	Nominated	

=== South African Music Awards ===
Year	Nominee / work	Award	Result	Ref.
2024	"Mohigan Sun" featuring Oscar Mbo, Murumba Pitch	RAV Music Video of the Year	Nominated	
2024	"Horns in the Sun"	Motsepe Foundation Record of the Year	Nominated	
2024	"Burning Bush"	Best Collaboration	Nominated	
2024	"Yes God"	Remix of the Year	Nominated	
2024	Asante II	Best Dance Album	Nominated	
2025	"Takala"	Best Collaboration	Won	
2025	Cr4zy!!	Best Dance Album	Nominated	
2026	Asante III	Best Dance Album	Nominated	
