= Reason (South African rapper) =

South African rapper

- Also known as: ReasonHD; gaaaAHDbody; Sizwe Alakine
- Born: Sizwe Moeketsi; 30 June 1987 (age 38); Tembisa, South Africa
- Origin: Katlehong, South Africa
- Genres: Hip Hop; Amapiano
- Occupations: Rapper; singer; songwriter; record producer
- Years active: 2005–present
- Labels: Warner Music South Africa; Motif Records; Promised Land Records

Sizwe Moeketsi (born 30 June 1987) is a South African musician commonly known as Reason, a name he uses as a rapper. He is also known as Sizwe Alakine, an alter ego he adopted after taking up a career in Amapiano.

== Early life and education ==
Sizwe Moeketsi was born on 30 June 1987 in Tembisa, and grew up in Katlehong, South Africa.

== Career ==
Using the stage name Reason, his first appearance on mainstream radio was in 2004 on YFM Radio. He started recording in 2005, starting as a battle rapper, and came to prominence after his collaborative work with Ms Nthabi. He has worked with some of South Africa's respected names, including Stogie T, Moneoa, ProVerb, DJ Maphorisa, Kwesta, and HHP.

In 2014, Reason released an album titled Audio High Definition, which included hits like "2Cups Shakur" and "Glasses to The Ceiling", featuring Locnville.

After pursuing a career in Amapiano music, he adopted the alter ego Sizwe Alakine, releasing the song "Khanda Shisa" under that name in July 2021.

He has also been known as ReasonHD and gaaaAHDbody, the latter name also being the name of a 2014 hip hop track.

== Record labels ==
Reason signed a deal with Warner Music South Africa in February 2022, after formerly recording with Motif Records from 2011, and Promised Land Records.

== Discography ==
- The Reasoning (2010)
- Audio 3D (2012)
- Audio High Definition (2014)
- Audio Re-Definition (Reason Season) (2015)
- Love Girls (2017)
- Azania (2018)
- Alekine World (2022)

== Awards and nominations ==
Awards and nominations include Hype magazine's King of the Bedroom (2005); Top 5 Hottest unsigned rappers in South Africa (2005) by Hype; YFM Radio's Hip Hop show Rap Activity's Emcee of the Month (2005); and 10 Hottest Rappers in South Africa (2013).

Year	Award ceremony	Prize	Recipient/Nominated work	Results	Ref.
2013	South African Music Awards	Best Rap Album	Audio 3D	Nominated	
2013	South African Music Awards	Best Male Artist of the Year	Audio 3D	Nominated	
2015	South African Music Awards	Best Rap Album	Audio High Definition	Nominated	
2024	Metro FM Music Awards	Best Collaboration	"Imithandazo"	Won	
2024	Metro FM Music Awards	Best Amapiano	"Imithandazo"	Won	
2024	Metro FM Music Awards	Song of the Year	"Imithandazo"	Won	

== Personal life ==
Reason was married for seven years to Mosa Moeketsi and they had two children before divorcing. He also has twins through his relationship with Luthando Shosha.
