= Yallunder =

South African singer-songwriter (1994–2025)

- Born: Yolanda Nyembezi; 23 August 1994; Bizana, South Africa
- Died: 13 March 2025 (aged 30); Johannesburg, South Africa
- Education: Tshwane University of Technology
- Musical career
- Genre: Afro-soul
- Occupations: Singer; songwriter
- Instruments: Vocals
- Years active: 2018–2025
- Labels: 1020 Cartel; The Vth Season; Masani

Yolanda Nyembezi (23 August 1994 – 13 March 2025), professionally known as Yallunder, was a South African singer and songwriter. Born and raised in Bizana, Nyembezi signed her first record deal with 1020 Cartel, released her EP Uthando Lwam in 2020.

== Life and career ==
Yolanda Nyembezi was born on 23 August 1994 in the village of Sea View in Mbizana (now Bizana), Eastern Cape.

Yallunder attended Nongeke S.S.S where she matriculated. In 2016, she graduated at Tshwane University of Technology. That same year, Yallunder began recording cover songs.

In February 2018, Nyembezi covered "Buya" by Black Coffee released off Piece of Me (2015).

After her graduation she joined Gauteng Opera, later she met Sjava who signed her to 1020 Cartel, she has co-written and also featured on the compilation Isambulo which was released on 28 August 2020. Her first project Uthando Lwam was released in November 2020. At the 15th ceremony of South African Traditional Music Awards, her song "Impilo Iyaqhubeka" was nominated for Best IsiXhosa Artist/Group.

In August 2021, she established her show Truth, which premiered on Locaflix.

In early May 2022, she signed a record deal with The Vth Season, and released her single "Emaphupheni Am", on 6 May. In early June 2023, Yallunder established her own record label Masani Music. That same month she announced her debut studio album Kum, released on 4 August 2023. Its lead single "11:11 Makukhanye" was released on 9 June 2023.

Yallunder released "Imali", featuring Mpho.Wav and Kenza on 26 October 2023.

Yallunder died at the Charlotte Maxeke Academic Hospital in Johannesburg, on 13 March 2025, at the age of 30.

== Discography ==
=== Studio albums ===
- Kum (2023)

=== Collaborative albums ===
- iSambulo (2020)

=== Extended plays ===
- Uthando Lwam (2020)

=== Guest appearances ===
Title	Year	Other artist(s)	Album
"Inhliziyo"	2020	Nue_Sam	iSambulo
"Abanjani"	2020	Mzukulu, Anzo	iSambulo
"Ndinovalo"	2020		iSambulo
"Bawo"	2022	Kabza De Small, Nobuhle	KOA II Part 1
"Ukukhanya"	2023	Kelvin Momo, Stixx	Kurhula
"Imvuselelo"	2024	Kelvin Momo, Thamie Sax	Sewe
"Themba"	2024	Kelvin Momo, Mkeyz	Sewe
"Lang'elihle"	2024	Kelvin Momo, Babalwa M, Sia Mzizi	Sewe
"Mthuthuzeli"	2024	Babalwa M	Candour
"Intyantyambo"	2024	Kelvin Momo, Babalwa M	Ntsako

== Achievements ==
=== City Awards ===
Year	Nominee / work	Award	Result
2021	Herself	Best Newcomer of the Year	Won

=== South African Dance Music Awards ===
Year	Nominee / work	Award	Result	Ref.
2024	Herself	Best Female Vocalist	Pending	

=== South African Traditional Music Awards ===
Year	Nominee / work	Award	Result	Ref.
2021	Uthando Lwam	Best IsiXhosa Artist/Group	Nominated	

=== South African Music Awards ===
Year	Nominee / work	Award	Result
2023	"Ndinovalo" (Mörda, Yallunder)	Remix of the Year	Won
