= Amakhehla =

Song by Sjava, uDumakahle, Anzo featuring Vernotile

from the album Isibuko
- Released: January 27, 2023
- Recorded: 2019–2022
- Genre: African trap, Afro-pop
- Length: 4:13
- Label: 1020 Cartel
- Songwriters: Jabulani Hadebe; uDumakahle; Anzo
- Producer: Ruff

"Amakhehla" is a song by South African singer-songwriter and rapper Sjava, uDumakahle, Anzo featuring Vernotile from his third studio album, Isibuko (2023). It was written by Jabulani Hadebe, Anzo, and uDumakahle with production handled by Ruff. It was certified Platinum in South Africa.

Music video directed by Luthando Sigubudu was released on March 15, 2023.

== Production and release ==
The South African singer-songwriter Sjava began work on his third studio album, Isibuko, in early 2018. For the album's sound, Sjava worked with his frequent producer Ruff and also recruited Jahcool, Vuyo Manyike, Juda Ngwenya, Zadok, Webmoms, and Delayde, as a producer on Isibuko.

"Amakhehla" was the first song Sjava, Anzo and uDumakahle wrote in their collaboration and for Isibuko.

In 2019, Sjava recorded the chorus of the song. After one year later in 2021, Sjava sent a chorus to uDumakahle and recorded his verse on the chorus. Following year Anzo recorded his verse with backing vocals from South African singer Vernotile. In 2022, Anzo's verse was re-recorded by Ruff.

In December 2022, Sjava announced Isibuko and its release date. "Amakhehla" is the twelfth track on the album.

== Accolades ==
"Amakhehla" received a nomination for Best Produced Music Video at 30th ceremony of South African Music Awards.

Awards and nominations for "Amakhehla"
Organization	Year	Category	Result	Ref.
South African Music Awards	South African Music Awards	Best Produced Music Video	Nominated	

== Certifications ==
Certification for "Amakhehla"
Region	Certification	Certified units/sales
South Africa (RISA)	Platinum	40,000^{‡}
^{‡} Sales+streaming figures based on certification alone.
