= Nonhle Mbuthuma =

South African environmental activist (born 1979)

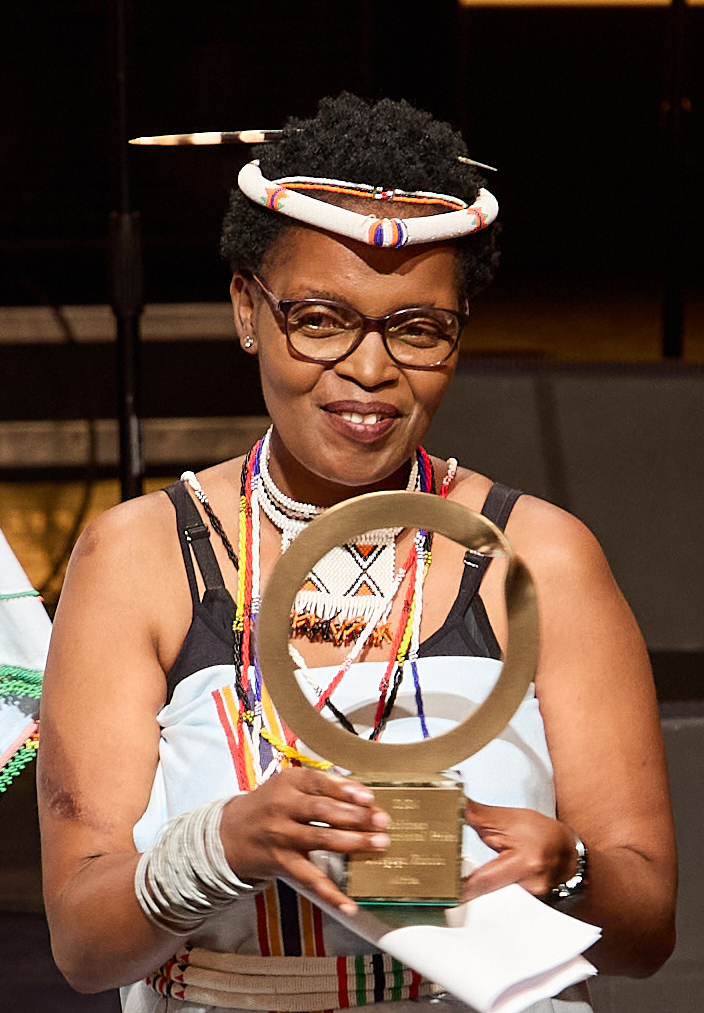
- Mbuthuma in 2024
- Born: 1979 (age 46–47); Xolobeni, Eastern Cape, South Africa
- Occupation: Environmental activist
- Years active: 2007–present
- Organization: Amadiba Crisis Committee
- Known for: Environmental activism in the Wild Coast
- Awards: Goldman Environmental Prize (2024)

Nonhle Mbuthuma (born c. 1979) is a South African environmental activist. She is the co-founder and spokesperson of the Amadiba Crisis Committee, which opposed planned titanium mining and seismic surveys of the Wild Coast region of South Africa, for which she was jointly awarded the 2024 Goldman Environmental Prize with Sinegugu Zukulu.

== Biography ==
Mbuthuma was born in Xolobeni in what was then the unrecognised republic of Transkei in what is now the Eastern Cape province of South Africa. She grew up on the Wild Coast, where her parents cultivated sweet potatoes and bananas on a farm near the town of Bizana in the traditional Pondoland region.

As a teenager, Mbuthuma worked as a tour guide in Pondoland and the Wild Coast, primary completing ecological tours demonstrating the area's biodiversity, as well as whale watching tours. Her job was supported by the European Union, with hopes that the development of ecotourism would be an income opportunity for people living in the region.

=== Mineral Commodities Ltd. drilling (2007–2018) ===
In 2007, Mbuthuma was a founding member of the Amadiba Crisis Committee which opposed a mining project announced by the Australian company Mineral Commodities Ltd. In 2008, Mineral Commodities obtained a permit with local company Xolobeni Empowerment Company to extract mineral deposits in Pondoland. While some people living in the Wild Coast region supported the mining project, feeling it would improve employment and infrastructure, those living closer to the coast expressed concerns about losing their farms, the polluting of local rivers, and the displacement of both wildlife and also residents to townships. Mbuthuma voiced concerns that the decision to mine the Wild Coast was due to it coming under black tribal administration as part of the Pondoland area of Mpondo people, describing it as a "lingering affect" of apartheid.

Mbuthuma became the leader of the ACC in 2016 after her partner, Sikhosiphi Rhadebe, was murdered by individuals dressed as police officers, one of ten anti-mining activists to be killed during that period in the region. Mbuthuma herself was subject to an assassination attempt, forcing her to move.

Mbuthuma with the ACC initiated legal proceedings before the High Court in Pretoria, arguing that the proposed open pit mine would "destroy" the livelihoods of people living on the Wild Coast. In November 2018, the Court ruled in favour of the ACC. The judge, Annali Basson, cited a ruling by the Constitutional Court of South Africa emphasising the connection between the country of South Africa and the African people, stipulating that the Ministry of Mines must obtain the consent from residents of a region before issuing mining contracts.

=== Shell seismic surveys (2021–2022) ===
When plans for Shell to complete seismic surveys along the Wild Coast were made public in November 2021, Mbuthuma and fellow activist Sinegugu Zukuluorganised a meeting of communities and groups within the Wild Coast area, and began collecting affidavits from residents. These included stressing the spiritual importance of the Wild Coast within Mpondo culture. On 6 December 2021, Mbuthuma filed an emergency motion against the surveys, submitting an affidavit with local testimonies; on 28 December, the High Court in Makhanda issued an injunction ordering Shell to cease any further seismic exploration in the Wild Coast area. On 1 September 2022, the Court revoked Shell's exploration permit; while this was due to the permit being made in 2014 with another agency and then unlawfully transferred over to Shell, the Court also highlighted that Shell had made "inadequate consultations" with affected communities.

Zukulu and Mbuthuma's campaign was credited for leading to the broader recognition of indigenous cultural and spiritual rights in environmental proceedings. In 2024, they were jointly awarded the 2024 Goldman Environmental Prize.

=== Subsequent activism (2022–present) ===
In July 2026, Mbuthuma spoke out against the construction of the N2 Wild Coast Toll Highway, stating that it had caused the destruction of wetlands along the Wild Coast. She called for the proposed highway to be moved inland.
