= Umsebenzi =

EP by Sjava
- Released: 4 December 2020
- Length: 16:30
- Label: 1020 Cartel
- Producer: Ruff; Zadok; Webmoms; Delayde; Vuyo Mnyike

Sjava chronology
Umphako (2018)	Umsebenzi (2020)

Umsebenzi is an extended play by South African singer-songwriter and rapper Sjava. It was released on 4 December 2020 through 1020 Cartel. It features guest appearance from Ami Faku, and Ndabo Zulu.

Umsebenzi was certified Gold in South Africa.

== Track listing ==
All tracks are written by Sjava.

Umsebenzi — Standard Edition
No.	Title	Producer(s)	Length
1.	"Umcebo"	Delayde; Webmoms	3:52
2.	"Imigomo Nemibandela"	Zadok; Ruff	3:54
3.	"Ikusasa"	Manyike	5:07
4.	"Maduze"	Ruff; Manyike	3:37
Total length:			16:30

Umsebenzi — Gold Deluxe Edition
No.	Title	Writer(s)	Producer(s)	Length
5.	"Luhle Ngani"	Jabulani Makhubo; Mfanafuthi Nkosi	Ruff	3:20
6.	"Edokodweni"	Makhubo; Nkosi	Ruff	4:55
7.	"Balele" (featuring Ami Faku)	Makhubo; Amanda Faku	Young2unnBeats	3:55
8.	"Umoya"	Makhubo; Nkosi	Ruff	4:05
9.	"Ushevu"	Makhubo; Nkosi; Ndabo Zulu	Ruff	3:53
Total length:				36:00

== Personnel ==
Adapted from AllMusic.

- Delayde – producer
- Joe Mawson – composer
- Karum Cooper – composer
- Mfanafuthi Nkosi – composer
- Ruff – producer
- Sjava – primary artist
- Tshupo Benjamin Khutsoane – composer
- Vuyo Manyike – composer, producer
- Webmoms – producer
- Zadok – producer

== Awards ==
At the 27th South African Music Awards was nominated for Best Adult Contemporary Album and won Best Produced Album. In addition, Umsebenzi was nominated for Best Male Artist/Group at the 15th Ceremony of South African Traditional Music Awards.

Year	Nominee / work	Award	Result	Ref.
2021	Umsebenzi	Best Adult Contemporary Album	Nominated	
2021	Umsebenzi	Best Produced Album	Won	
2021	Umsebenzi	Best Male Artist/Group	Nominated	

== Certification and sales ==
Region	Certification	Certified units/sales
South Africa (RISA)	Gold	10,000^{‡}
^{‡} Sales+streaming figures based on certification alone.

== Release history ==
List of release dates, showing region, formats, label, editions and reference
Region	Date	Format(s)	Label	Edition(s)	Ref.
South Africa	December 4, 2020	Digital download; streaming	1020 Cartel	Standard	
South Africa	October 1, 2021	Digital download; streaming	1020 Cartel	Gold Deluxe	
