= Xolobeni mine =

Proposed South African titanium mine

- Location: Xholobeni, Eastern Cape, South Africa
- Products: Titanium

The Xolobeni mine is a proposed titanium mine located in the Wild Coast region of the Eastern Cape of South Africa. The proposed mine has reserves amounting to 348.7 million tonnes of ore grading 5% titanium.

The government decision to support the company's 2007 application for Mining Right was challenged by the Amadiba Crisis Committee (AAC), formed in 2007 by local people who would be affected by the mine. The lands have traditionally been held communally by local villages. The subsequent decades-long conflict has been marked by violence. The chairman of the Amadiba Crisis Committee, Sikhosiphi 'Bazooka' Rhadebe, was assassinated in 2016. Amnesty International has called on South Africa to respect the rights of indigenous people and to protect threatened indigenous rights advocates such as Nonhle Mbuthuma, another founder of the ACC.

In September 2016 the Minister of Mineral Resources announced an 18-month moratorium on mining in the Xolobeni area. In September 2018, it was proposed that the moratorium be extended for another two years. As of 22 November 2018, Judge Annali Basson of the Pretoria High Court stated that even if the informal rights of customary communities had not been protected by law previously, they had the right to decide what would happen to their land. Therefore the Minister of Mineral Resources cannot grant mining rights to the Xolobeni lands without first obtaining the full and formal consent of the Xolobeni community. In spite of the decision, Mineral Resources Minister Gwede Mantashe continues to support the mining project.

== Proposal ==
Mineral Commodities Limited had confirmed the presence of mineral deposits in the area by 2002. As of March 2007, Mineral Commodities Limited’s South African subsidiary Transworld Energy and Minerals Resources submitted a Mining Right Application to the Department of Minerals and Energy (“DME”) in Port Elizabeth, South Africa. It described the Xolobeni Project as "one of the largest undeveloped mineral sands resources in the world". The area was projected to contain more than 9,000,000 tonnes of ilmenite, titanium-iron oxide mineral, as well as rutile, zircon and leucoxene. The expected lifetime of the mine was 22 years.

Mining rights to five sectors were requested as part of the Xolobeni Mineral Sands Project (Xolobeni). The Xolobeni area is described as being located "between the Mzamba and Mtentu Rivers, along the east coast of South Africa." The Kwanyana Block is described as extending "along the coast bordered by the Mnyameni River along the northern boundary and the Kwanyana River to the south." Five villages were included in the area: Sigidi, Mdatya, Mtulana, Kwanyana and Mthentu.

The area is characterized by "high unemployment, poor education levels and a rural population primarily dependent on agriculture, animal herding for sustenance", with 72.2% of people in the larger region living below the poverty line. It is one of the most impoverished communities in South Africa. There were efforts by several regional organizations, beginning as early as 1997, to develop ecotourism resources in the area. The main business in the area between 2000 and 2004 was AmaDiba Adventures, an EU-supported award-winning ecotourism initiative owned and run by the Amadiba community.

== Reception ==
The proposed mine met fierce opposition from members of the local Xolobeni community, who formed the Amadiba Crisis Committee in 2007. The mining proposals were challenged both on the grounds that community members who would be directly affected had not been properly consulted, and on the grounds that the Xolobeni area is part of the Pondoland Marine Protected Area, and therefore not open to mining under the National Environmental Management: Protected Areas Act 57 of 2003.

== Initial granting of mining rights ==
The Department of Minerals and Energy, under Buyelwa Sonjica, granted mining rights to the Kwanyana Block to the Mineral Resource Commodities and to Transworld Energy and Mineral Resources as of 14 July 2008. The expected signing date for the Xolobeni Mining Right was 31 October 2008. This was blocked by the filing of an appeal by the Amadiba Crisis Committee and Grahamstown office of the Legal Resources Centre in September 2008, requesting that the Minister of Minerals and Energy suspend and appeal the decision to grant the Mining Right.

== Revoking of rights ==
On 17 May 2011, Minister of Mineral Resources Susan Shabangu revoked her predecessor's award of mining rights in the Kwanyana Block to Mineral Resource Commodities and to Transworld Energy and Mineral Resources. The mining company was given a 90-day grace period to appeal, if they chose to address the environmental concerns at issue. However, Shabangu also indicated that she considered the company to have followed an adequate community consultation process, a conclusion that did not agree with findings of the South African Human Rights Commission (SAHRC) on the matter.

== Environmental impact assessment ==
As of March 2015, the company again filed a Mining Right Application to develop mines in approximately 2800 hectares including the areas of Mtentu, Sikombe, Kwanyana, Mnyameni, and Mpahlane. In order for the Xolobeni project to move forward, as per South African law, and as administered by the Department of Mineral Resources, the Company was required to engage an Independent Environmental Consultant to conduct an environmental impact assessment (EIA) as part of their Mining Right Application. An independent assessment can be an important source of information for the residents of the local community, where the mining is proposed. Without the EIA, local residents are unable to make a fully informed decision of the pros and cons of the project, thus are not empowered with the necessary information to make the decision to support the proposed mineral sand mine based on the merits of the project versus the consequences of mining to their community.

In April 2015, a delegation attempting to perform an environmental impact assessment on behalf of the mining company were forced to leave the area after residents protested.

== Community impact ==
Estimates of the number of families that would be affected by the proposed mine vary widely. The ACC has suggested that as many as 200 families might be affected by displacement or disruption of the use of tribal grazing lands. As of 2015, an assessment reported that residents of 62 homes would be affected in the demarcated mining area. In a court filing of 2016, it was stated that 70 families would be directly affected and many more indirectly affected. In contrast, the mining company has claimed that only three families will need to be relocated if the mine proceeds.

The Company released a report of a community engagement meeting at Xolobeni in 2015, stating that 498 questions/concerns were raised by an estimated 200 people. By their account, the majority of the residents (77%) supported the mine, or were happy to support the local infrastructure upgrades that would result because of the mine. Only 10% of residents opposed the mine in principle alone, thus leaving 20 people in total currently opposing the mine. 5% of the residents were undecided and 8% asked for more information.

An imbizo at Komkhulu (the Great Place) in January 2016 was attended by about 500 people from the Amadiba region. The meeting was called by the Pondo queen MaSobhuza Sigcau, and chaired by Mdatya leader, Zadla Dlamini. People came from the Xolobeni, Mdatya, Mtolani and Sigidi villages. Those attending vocally opposed the mining operations.

Two of the most prominent local mining advocates are Zamile Qunya and Lunga Baleni. Both have been accused of conflict of interest, as a result of positions and benefits they receive from the mining company. Zamile Qunya is a founder of Xolco, a company formed in 2003 to act as an "empowerment partner" on behalf of TEM and MRC.

From the time of its formation XolCo presented itself as a company that represented the AmaDiba community’s interest in the mining venture. The company even submitted a petition to the DMR alleging that it had been signed by supporters of the venture. The petition was discredited later as fraudulent after it emerged that some of the names and signatures were of deceased community members or people who denied having signed it. XolCo was also accused of co-opting community leaders to become directors (although not on official company documents), and attempting to coerce and then later, to manipulate and threaten community members into supporting the mining initiative.

Local Amadiba chief, Lunga Baleni, who accepted a 4x4 vehicle paid for by the mining company, is supportive of the proposed mine, but most residents are in opposition. Lunga Baleni is also a director of both TEM and Xolco.

In February 2016, Chief Baleni announced that a water drilling programme would commence, and it was alleged that Baleni stated force would be used if the community attempted to stop the drilling. It was reported that over 200 residents waited on the announced day to stop the drillers, who failed to arrive. The Company released their intentions for the drilling programme on their website, which stated that the programme would "have left 3 fully equipped boreholes with fresh drinkable water for the community" however due to the threats of violence, the Company cancelled the programme.

== Violence against local activists ==
In December 2015, villagers returning from a mass-meeting opposing the mine, and in defence of a local headwoman who had been intimidated, were attacked by a gang wielding knobkerries and pangas. Four men were arrested for their part in the attack.

In March 2016, the chairman of the Amadiba Crisis Committee, Sikhosiphi 'Bazooka' Rhadebe, was assassinated. Rhadebe's son and wife were also seriously injured during the assassination. Rhadebe had allegedly warned of police involvement in the violence against mine opponents, and shortly before his death it has been alleged that he discovered a hit list of mine opponents, on which his name was first. The police have not been able to verify the allegation of a "hit list" as true. Another committee member, Nonhle Mbuthuma, claimed that Rhadebe was murdered by men claiming to be police officers, and in a vehicle with a rotating blue light. The mining Company sent condolences to the family.

Threats have been made against other members of the ACC, including Nonhle Mbuthuma, who now has a constant bodyguard. Inhabitants of the village of Mdatya, including its headwoman Cynthia Duduzile Baleni, have been harassed and attacked. Amnesty International has called on South Africa to respect the rights of indigenous people and to protect Nonhle Mbuthuma and other indigenous rights advocates.

== Proposed divestment ==
In July 2016, MRC announced its intention to withdraw from the project, stating that "In light of the ongoing violence and threats to the peace and harmony of the local Xolobeni community, the company accepts that the future viability of the Xolobeni Project should be managed by stakeholders and organisations exclusively owned by South African people." However, the divestment did not occur. As of October 2018, Mineral Commodities still held a 56% interest in Transworld Energy and Minerals, and continued to pursue the potential for mining in the area. Mark Caruso, chairman of Mineral Resource Commodities, continues to be a director of TEM.

== Moratorium ==
In September 2016, the Minister of Mineral Resources Mosebenzi Zwane announced an 18-month moratorium on mining in the Xolobeni area, citing the “significant social disintegration and highly volatile nature of the current situation in the area”. The application by Transworld Energy and Mineral Resources SA was frozen, and it was stated that no new applications would be permitted. In September 2018, it was proposed that the moratorium be extended for another two years.

As of 22 November 2018, Judge Annali Basson of the Pretoria High Court stated that even if the informal rights of customary communities had not been protected by law previously, they had the right to decide what would happen to their land. Therefore the Minister of Mineral Resources cannot grant mining rights to the Xolobeni lands without first obtaining the full and formal consent of the Xolobeni community.
