= Isibuko =

Studio album by Sjava
- Released: January 27, 2023
- Recorded: 2018–2022
- Length: 60:13 (Standard Edition); 60:29 (Deluxe Edition)
- Label: 1020 Cartel
- Producers: Delayde; Jahcool; Vuyo Manyike; Juda Ngwenya; Mfanafuthi Ruff Nkosi; Webmoms; Zadok

Sjava chronology
Umqhele (2018)	Isibuko (2023)	Inkanyezi (2025)

Isibuko is a third studio album by South African singer Sjava, released through 1020 Cartel on January 27, 2023. Production was handled by his frequent producer Ruff. The album also features artists such as Emtee, Saudi, Anzo, Sampa the Great, Lolli Native, Delayde, Nontokozo Mkhize, Vernotile, Dumakahle, Q Twins, Umzulu Phaqa, Shwi and Mzukulu.

It reached number one in South Africa and certified Platinum by the Recording Industry of South Africa (RiSA).

Sjava released a deluxe version of the album, titled Isibuko (Deluxe) on May 10, 2024, which includes the original album's 18 tracks along with 4 new ones. With features from A-Reece, K-Shine, Sastii, LaCabra, Lowfeye and Blue Pappi.

== Commercial performance ==
Isibuko upon its release became the most streamed album surpassing 7.7 million streams in less than 7 days across all digital streaming platforms and garnned over 20.3 million streams after 3 weeks.

As of July 2023, Isibuko has garnered over 42 million digital streams.

== Awards ==
Isibuko was nominated for Best Afrosoul Pop at the 2023 Metro FM Awards. Also the album earned 4 nominations at 29th South African Music Awards. Isibuko (Deluxe) won Best Afro Pop Album at the 31st South African Music Awards.

Year	Nominee / work	Award	Result
2023	Isibuko	Best Afrosoul Pop	Nominated
2023	Isibuko	Male Artist of the Year	Nominated
2023	Isibuko	Album of the Year	Nominated
2023	Isibuko	Best Produced Album	Nominated
2023	Isibuko	Best Engineered Album	Nominated
2023	Isibuko	Best Afro Pop Album	Won
2025	Isibuko (Deluxe)	Best Afro Pop Album	Won

== Track listing ==
Isibuko — Standard Edition
No.	Title	Lyrics	Music	Producer(s)	Length
1.	"Thixo" (with Nontokozo Mkhize)	Jabulani Makhubo; Nontokozo Mkhize	Juda Ngwenya; Mfanafuthi Ruff Nkosi; Vuyo Manyike	Ngwenya; Nkosi; Manyike	4:12
2.	"Ubuhle Bendalo"	Makhubo; Karum Nesta Cooper	Joe Maurice Mawson; Manyike	Delayde; Webmoms	3:42
3.	"Ukube Ngangazi"	Makhubo	Mawson; Cooper	Delayde; Webmoms	3:10
4.	"Time"	Makhubo	Nkosi	Nkosi	3:50
5.	"Amaphiko" (with Saudi)	Makhubo; Anele Mbishe	Nkosi	Nkosi	4:21
6.	"Amavaka"	Makhubo	Mawson; Cooper	Delayde; Webmoms	3:42
7.	"Grounding" (with Delayde)	Makhubo	Mawson; Cooper	Delayde; Webmoms	4:54
8.	"My Life" (with Emtee and Lolli Native)	Makhubo; Mthembeni Ndevu; Luthando Dekeni	Nkosi	Nkosi	4:00
9.	"Iphisi"	Makhubo	Nkosi; Tshupo Khutsoane	Nkosi; Zadok	3:28
10.	"Dudlu"	Makhubo	Nkosi	Nkosi	4:30
11.	"Ungavumi" (with Saudi and Sampa the Great)	Makhubo; Mbishe; Sampa Tembo	Nkosi; Jahcool		4:58
12.	"Amakhehla" (with Udumakahle and Anzo featuring Vernotile)	Makhubo; Andile Ngubeni	Nkosi	Nkosi	4:13
13.	"Isoka" (with Q Twins and Mzukulu)	Makhubo; Sfanele Zulu	Nkosi	Nkosi	4:38
14.	"Amanxeba"	Makhubo	Nkosi	Nkosi; Delayde	2:51
15.	"Akabuye" (with Mzukulu and Inkos'yamagcokama)	Makhubo; Zulu; Scebi Dlamini	Nkosi	Nkosi	5:28
16.	"Ithuna" (with Shwi)	Makhubo; Mandla Xaba	Nkosi	Nkosi	4:11
17.	"Inhlonipho" (with Umzulu Phaqa and Webmoms)	Makhubo; Sphiwe Moya	Nkosi	Nkosi	4:28
18.	"Peace"	Makhubo	Mawson; Cooper; Manyike	Delayde; Webmoms; Manyike	2:41
Total length:					60:13

Isibuko — Deluxe Edition
No.	Title	Writer(s)	Producer(s)	Length
19.	"Typhoon" (Sjava, Qwellers featuring Sastii, LaCabra, Lowfeye and Blue Pappi)	Makhubo; Tinashe Freddie Jnr Magidi	Young Tune	4:36
20.	"Race" (Sjava, A-Reece and K-Shine)	Makhubo, Nkosi	Ruff	4:50
21.	"Ngibongiseni"	Makhubo; Mawson; Cooper; Mawande Nzima	Drunk Urameshi	2:36
22.	"Could Have Been You"	Makhubo; Mawson; Cooper	Webmons; Delayde	4:06
Total length:				60:29

== Promotion ==
Sjava announced Isibuko Tour to promote his album, first leg includes 3 dates; commenced on 18 March, State Theatre, 6 May, Cradle Boutique Hotel, Johannesburg and concluded on 27 May, Play House Theatre, Durban.

Towards the end of March 2024, Sjava announced second leg of Isibuko Tour was held on 22 June in Durban, Playhouse Theatre, followed by two nights at the Johannesburg Theatre on 12 and 13 July.

== Certifications ==
Region	Certification	Certified units/sales
South Africa (RISA)	Platinum	40,000^{‡}
^{‡} Sales+streaming figures based on certification alone.

== Release history ==
List of release dates, showing region, formats, label, editions and reference
Region	Date	Format(s)	Label	Edition(s)	Ref.
South Africa	January 27, 2023	Digital download; Streaming	1020 Cartel	Standard	
South Africa	May 10, 2024	Digital download; Streaming	1020 Cartel	Deluxe	
