= Oliver and Adelaide Tambo Regional Hospital =

Bizana provincial hospital

- Eastern Cape Department of Health
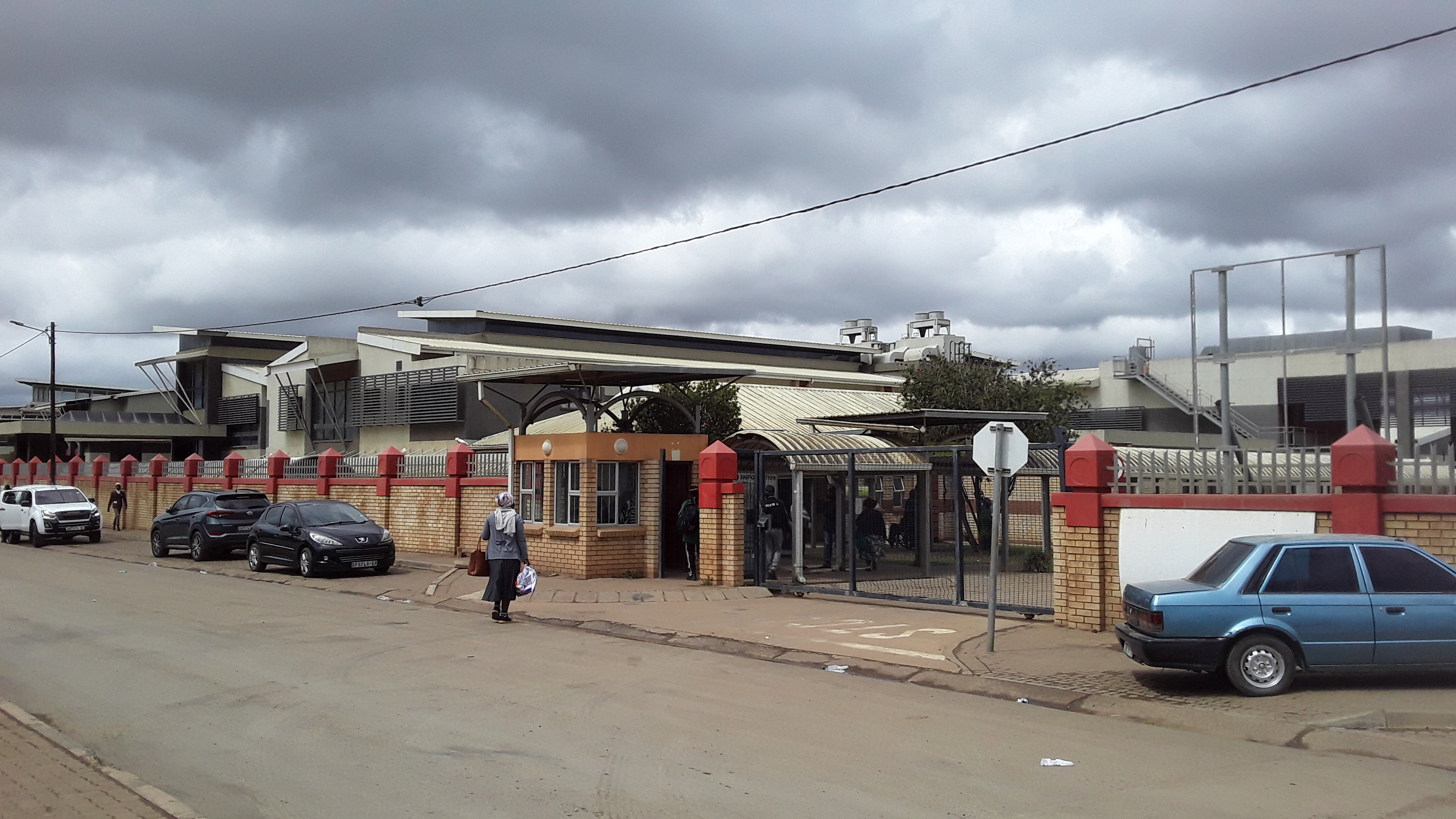
- Walkway to Oliver and Adelaide Tambo Regional Hospital entrance gate.

Geography
- Location: Bizana, Eastern Cape, South Africa
- Coordinates: 30°51′51″S 29°51′15″E

Organisation
- Care system: Public
- Type: Community

Services
- Emergency department: Yes

Links
- Website: St Patrick's Hospital
- Other links: List of hospitals in South Africa

Oliver and Adelaide Tambo Regional Hospital, formerly St. Patrick's Hospital, is a Provincial government funded hospital in Bizana in the Alfred Nzo District of the Eastern Cape Province of South Africa.

The hospital departments include Emergency department, Paediatric ward, Maternity ward, Out Patients Department, Surgical Services, Medical Services, Operating Theatre & CSSD Services, Ophthalmology, Pharmacy, Anti-Retroviral (ARV) treatment for HIV/AIDS, Post Trauma Counseling Services, Termination of Pregnancy Services, X-ray Services, Physiotherapy, Occupational Health Services, Laundry, Kitchen Services and Mortuary.

As of 2015, the hospital has 290 beds, 12 doctors, two clinical associates, two dentists, and numerous allied health professionals and nursing staff. There are several hundred births every month and 20 to 30 trauma cases and 250 outpatients per day. The hospital's catchment area has a population of around 200,000 people.

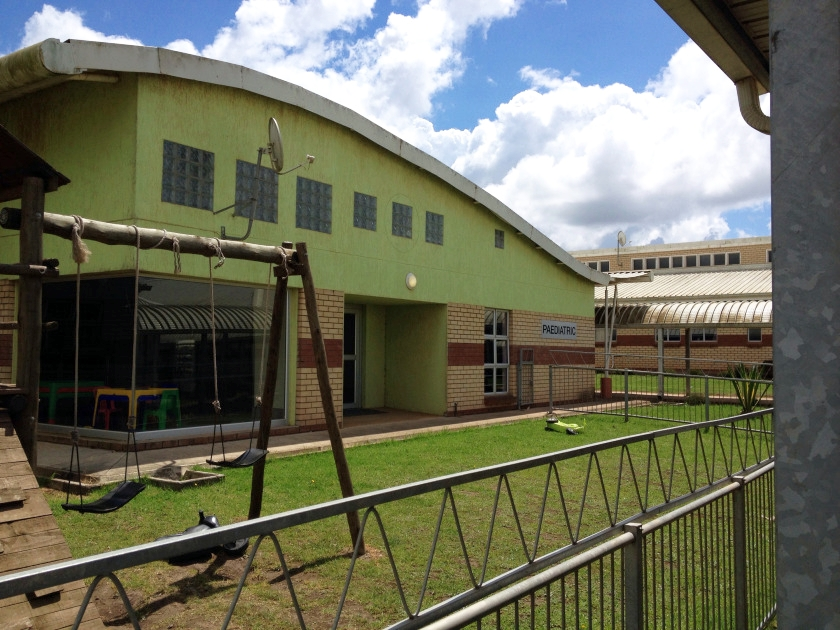
Paediatric Ward

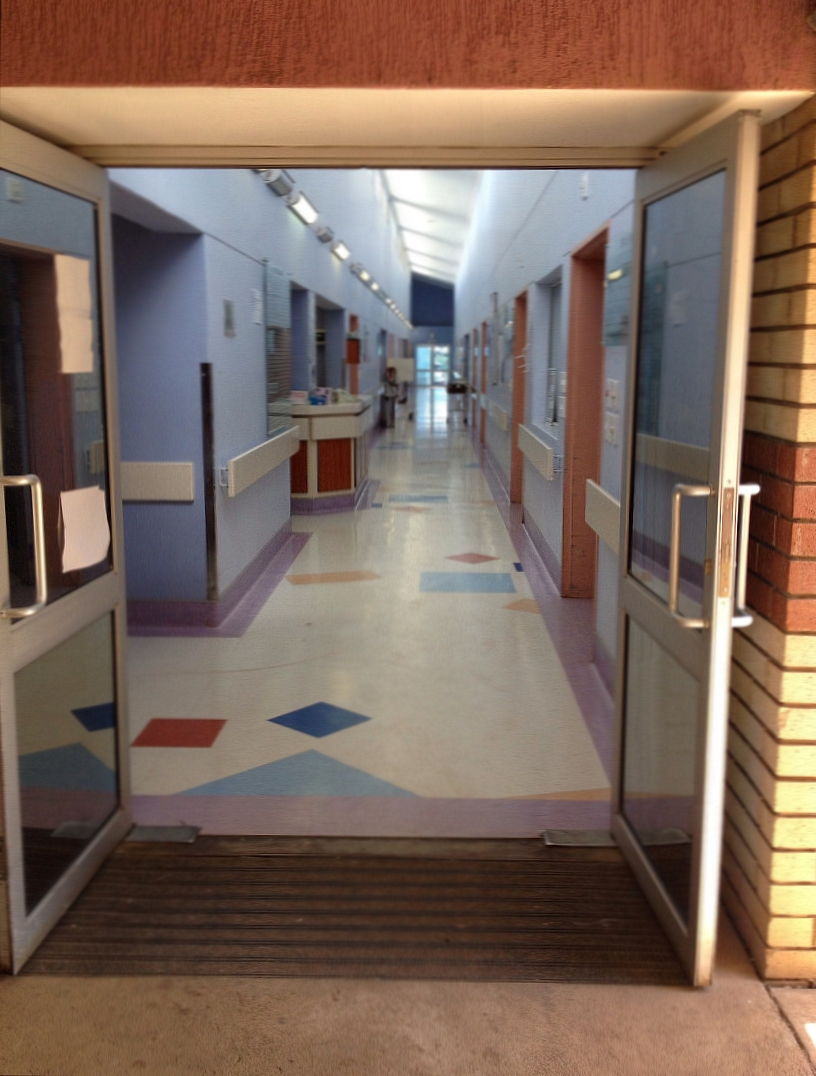
Inside of ward
