= Sinegugu Zukulu =

South African environmental activist (born 1978)

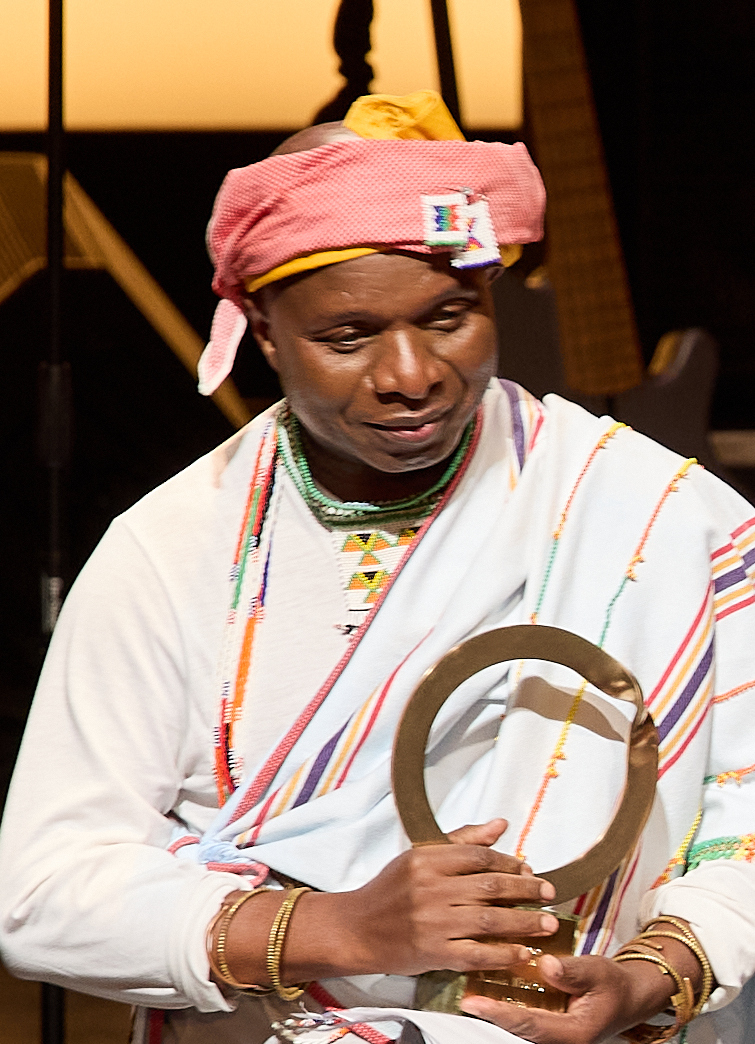
- Zukulu in 2024
- Born: 1978 (age 47–48); Bizana, Eastern Cape, South Africa
- Known for: Environmental activism in the Wild Coast
- Awards: Goldman Environmental Prize (2024)

Sinegugu Zukulu (born c. 1978) is a South African environmental activist known for his campaigns to protect marine ecosystems in the Wild Coast of South Africa from oil drilling. For his activism, he was jointly awarded the 2024 Goldman Environmental Prize with Nonhle Mbuthuma.

== Biography ==
Zukulu is a member of the Mpondo people, and was born and raised in Amadiba, Bizana, an administrative area in what was historically the territory of Mpondoland (today within the Eastern Cape province of South Africa), on the Wild Coast. He studied environmental law at university.

Zukulu is the programme director of Sustaining the Wild Coast. Through his role, he promoted developing ecotourism in the area, as well as agriculture and youth empowerment.

Between 2007 and 2018, he campaigned, alongside Nonhle Mbuthuma, against the construction of a proposed titanium mine in Amadiba, citing the area's importance for marine biodiversity.

When plans for Shell to complete seismic surveys along the Wild Coast were made public in November 2021, Zukulu and Mbuthuma organised a meeting of communities and groups within the Wild Coast area, and began collecting affidavits from residents. These included stressing the spiritual importance of the Wild Coast within Mpondo culture. On 6 December 2021, Zukulu filed an emergency motion against the surveys, submitting an affidavit with local testimonies; on 28 December, the High Court in Makhanda issued an injunction ordering Shell to cease any further seismic exploration in the Wild Coast area. On 1 September 2022, the Court revoked Shell's exploration permit; while this was due to the permit being made in 2014 with another agency and then unlawfully transferred over to Shell, the Court also highlighted that Shell had made "inadequate consultations" with affected communities.

Zukulu and Mbuthuma's campaign was credited for leading to the broader recognition of indigenous cultural and spiritual rights in environmental proceedings. In 2024, they were jointly awarded the 2024 Goldman Environmental Prize.
