= Inkwenkwezi Private Game Reserve =

- Location within Eastern Cape
- Location: Eastern Cape, South Africa
- Nearest city: East London, South Africa
- Coordinates: 32°50′16.27″S 28°4′46.31″E

Inkwenkwezi Private Game Reserve, is located approximately 30 km north-east of East London, and is situated within an area of 4500 hectares encompassing five different biomes in the Wild Coast region of South Africa's Eastern Cape province. It is home to four of the Big Five game; namely lion, buffalo, leopard and rhinoceros; as well as giraffe, zebra, a variety of antelope, and many other smaller species.

== Background ==
Inkwenkwezi, which translates from Xhosa to mean "under the stars", grew out of a dream of the Mthatha-born Stanton brothers, Graham and Keith. Graham Stanton purchased the first of several properties in the Chintsa valley area which were eventually combined to form Inkwenkwezi, in 1983.

In addition to wildlife, the Game Reserve hosts events, including weddings. In 2019, the reserve hosted the South African Majorettes and Cheerleading National Championships.

== Wildlife ==
Inkwenkwezi is home to several lions most of which are extremely rare white lions. One of the tawny females carries 50% of the white gene and has had both brown and white litters.

In 2017, five suspected poachers were caught at the reserve.

In 2019, the reserve received criticism when they transferred two elephants from the reserve to the Johannesburg Zoo.

== See also ==
- List of protected areas of South Africa
