= White lion =

Rare colour mutation of the Kruger subspecies of lion

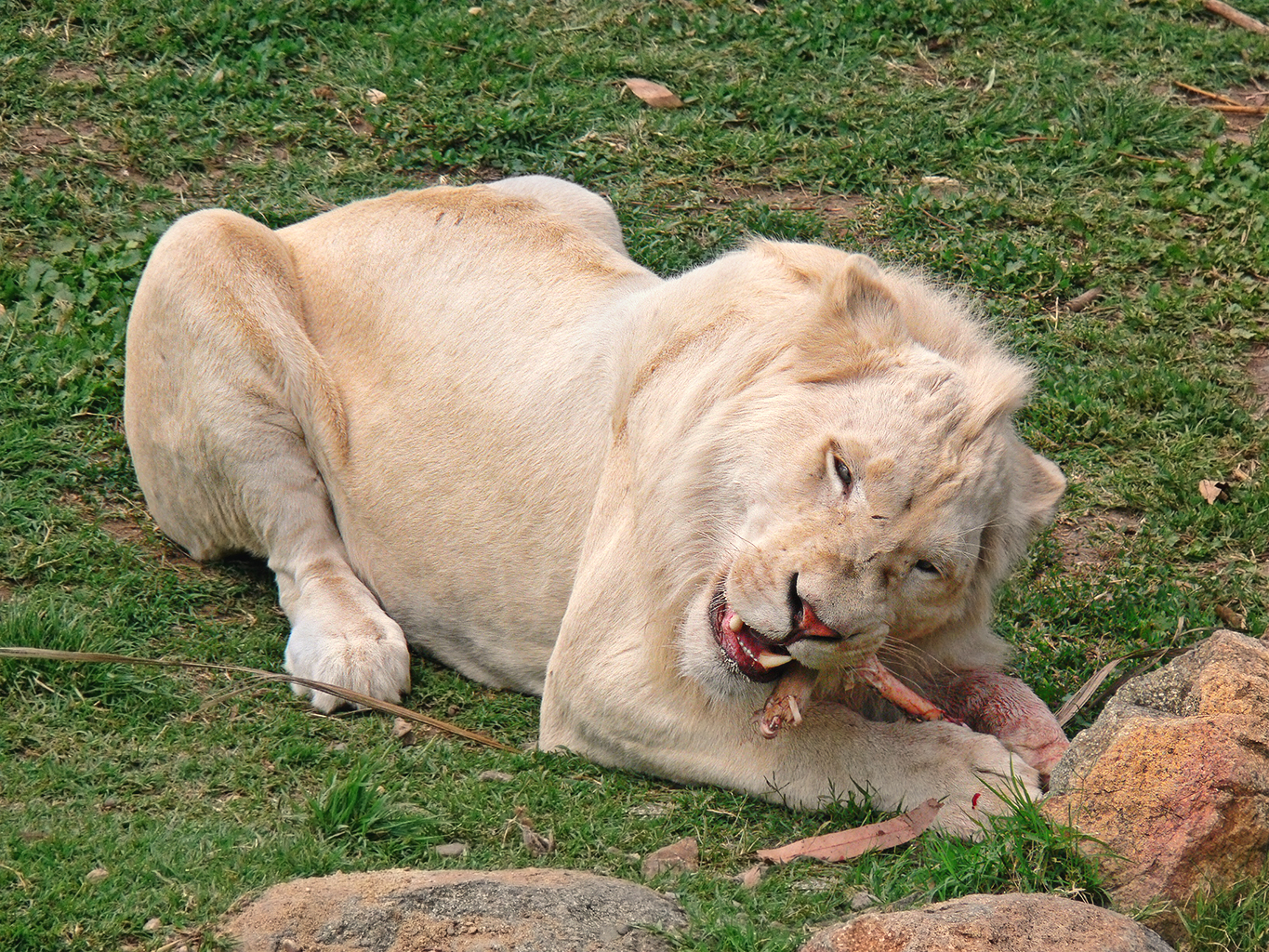
A white lion in the National Zoo & Aquarium of Australia

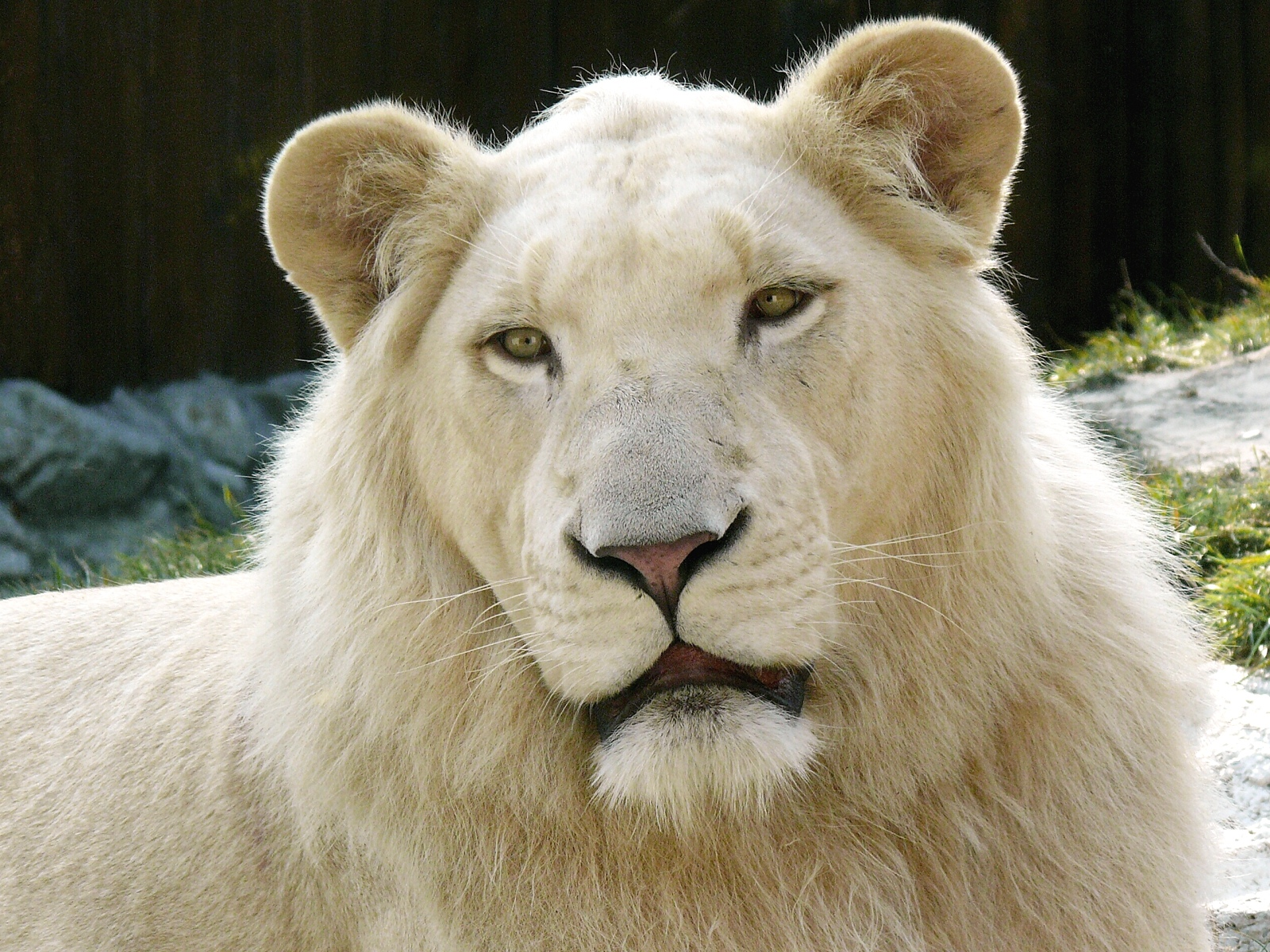
In Bratislava Zoo, Slovakia

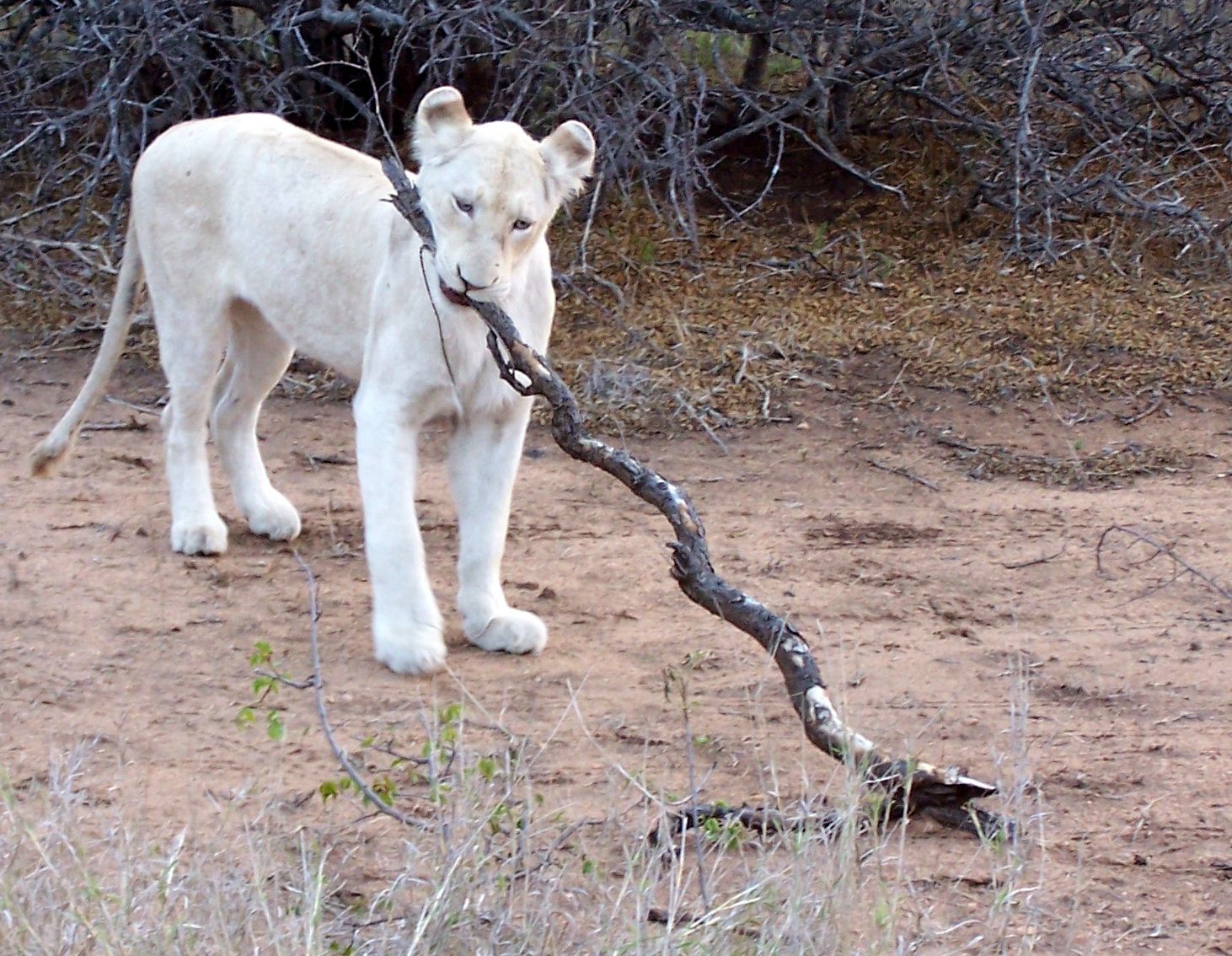
A juvenile lion in Kruger National Park, South Africa

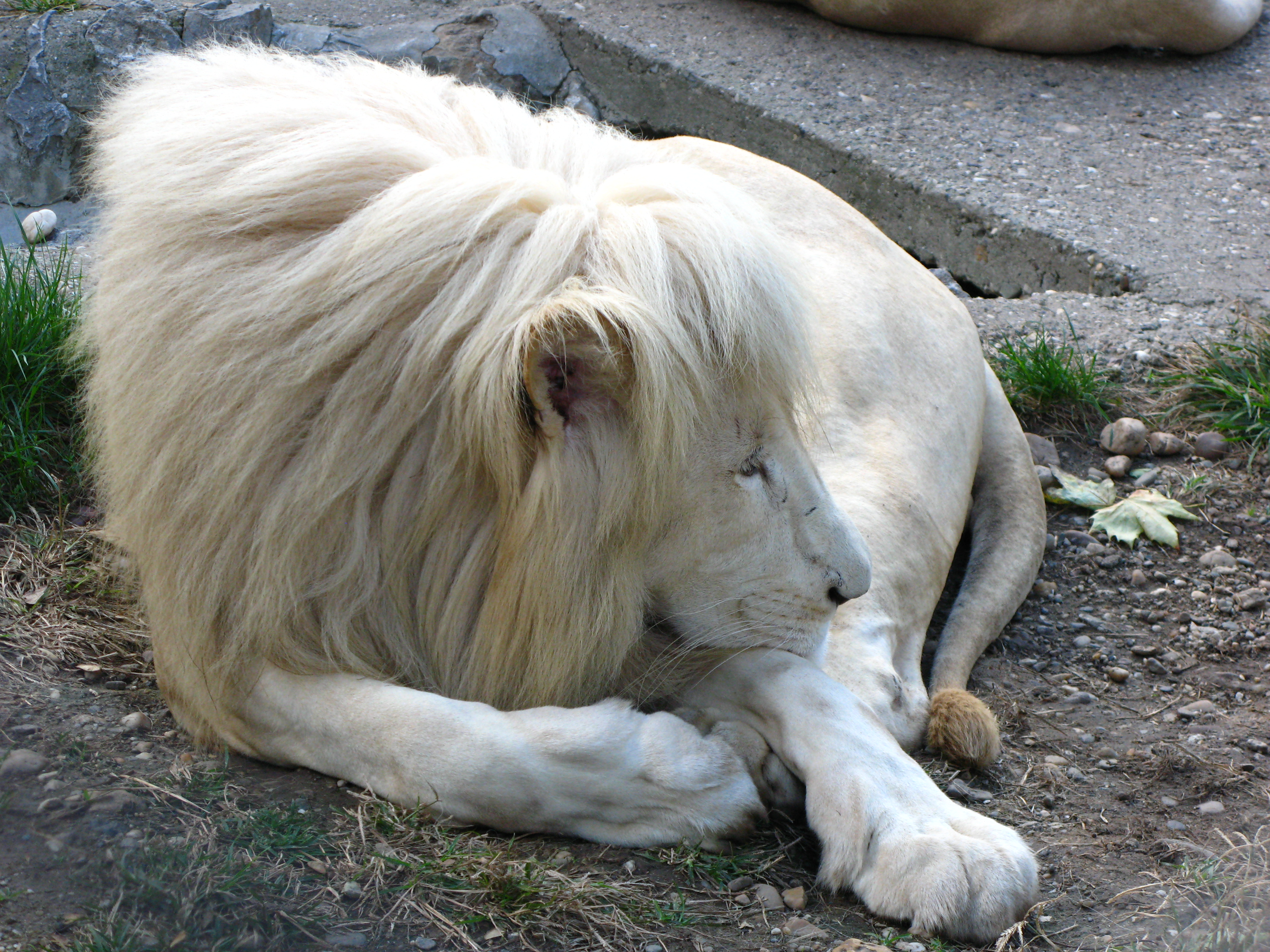
In Belgrade Zoo, Serbia

The white lion is a rare colour mutation of the lion, specifically the Southern African lion. White lions in the Timbavati region of South Africa are thought to have been indigenous to the area for centuries, although the earliest recorded sighting was in 1938.

== Description ==
White lions are not albino. Their white color is called leucism, and is caused by an allele that is found at the same locus as the allele that causes albinism. It is thought, but not proven, that the allele is inherited in an autosomal recessive fashion. They vary from blonde to near-white. This coloration does not appear to pose a disadvantage to their survival. White lions were considered to have been technically extinct in the wild between 1992 and 2004, when the Global White Lion Protection Trust achieved the first successful reintroduction of white lions to their natural habitat. These prides have continued to hunt and breed successfully in the wild, whilst other occurrences of white lion births have been reported in the greater Kruger region since then.

=== Genetics ===
The white lion is the same subspecies as the tawny South African lion (Panthera leo melanochaita), which is found in some wildlife reserves in South Africa, and in zoological parks around the world. White lions are leucistic due to a recessive mutation in the gene for Tyrosinase (TYR), an enzyme responsible for the production of melanin. White lions have pigment visible in the eyes (which may be the normal hazel or golden color, blue-gray, or green-gray), paw pads, and lips. Blue-eyed white lions exist and may be selectively bred.

Inbreeding can cause severe reproductive problems, including Arnold-Chiari malformation, which causes problems in the brain/skull and the spinal cord, most commonly in humans and dogs.

In 2013, the specific genetic marker that determines the unique coloration of white lions was identified, after a 7-year study led by the Global White Lion Protection Trust and partnering several different countries.

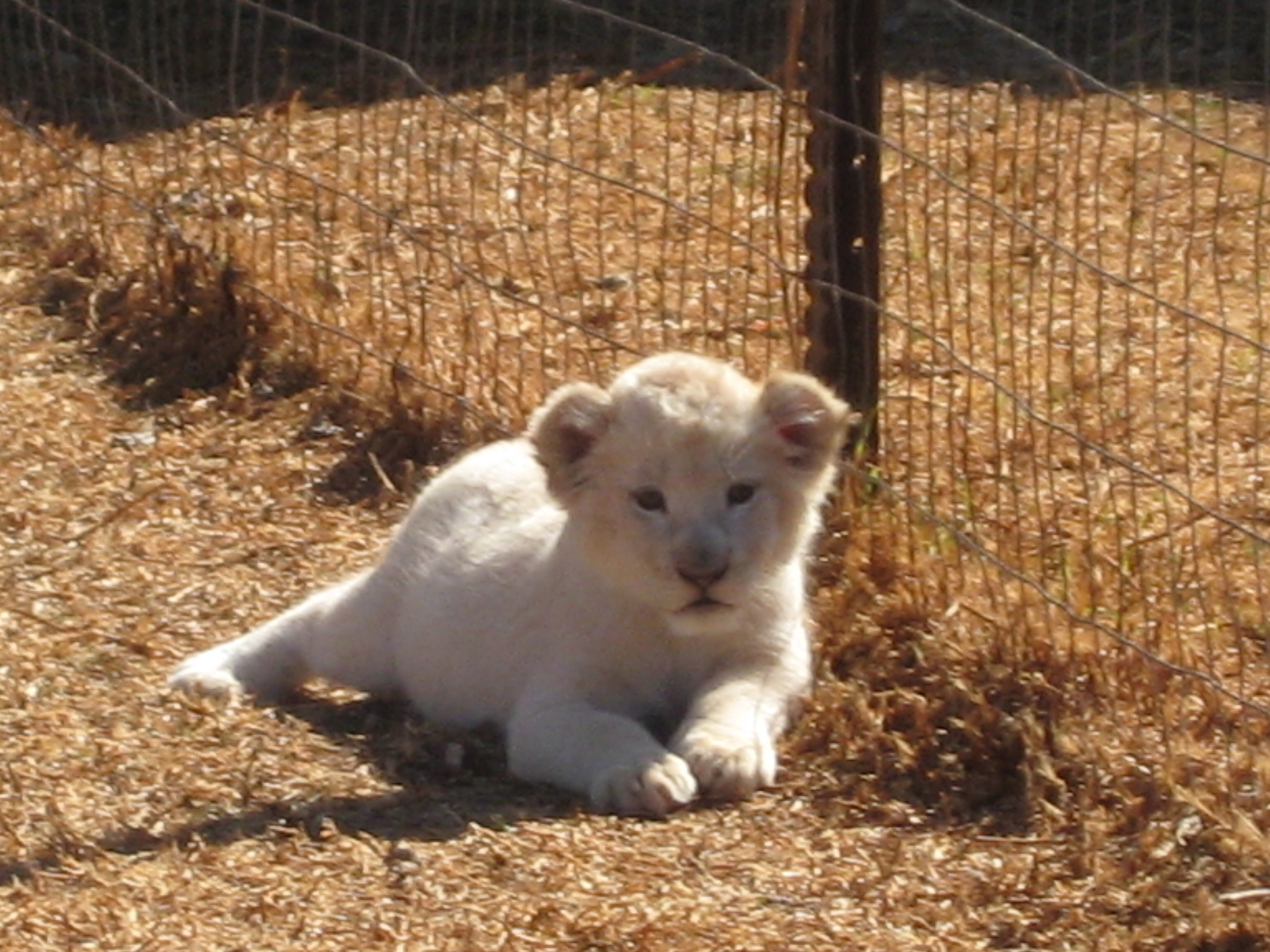
A cub at Kromdraai, South Africa

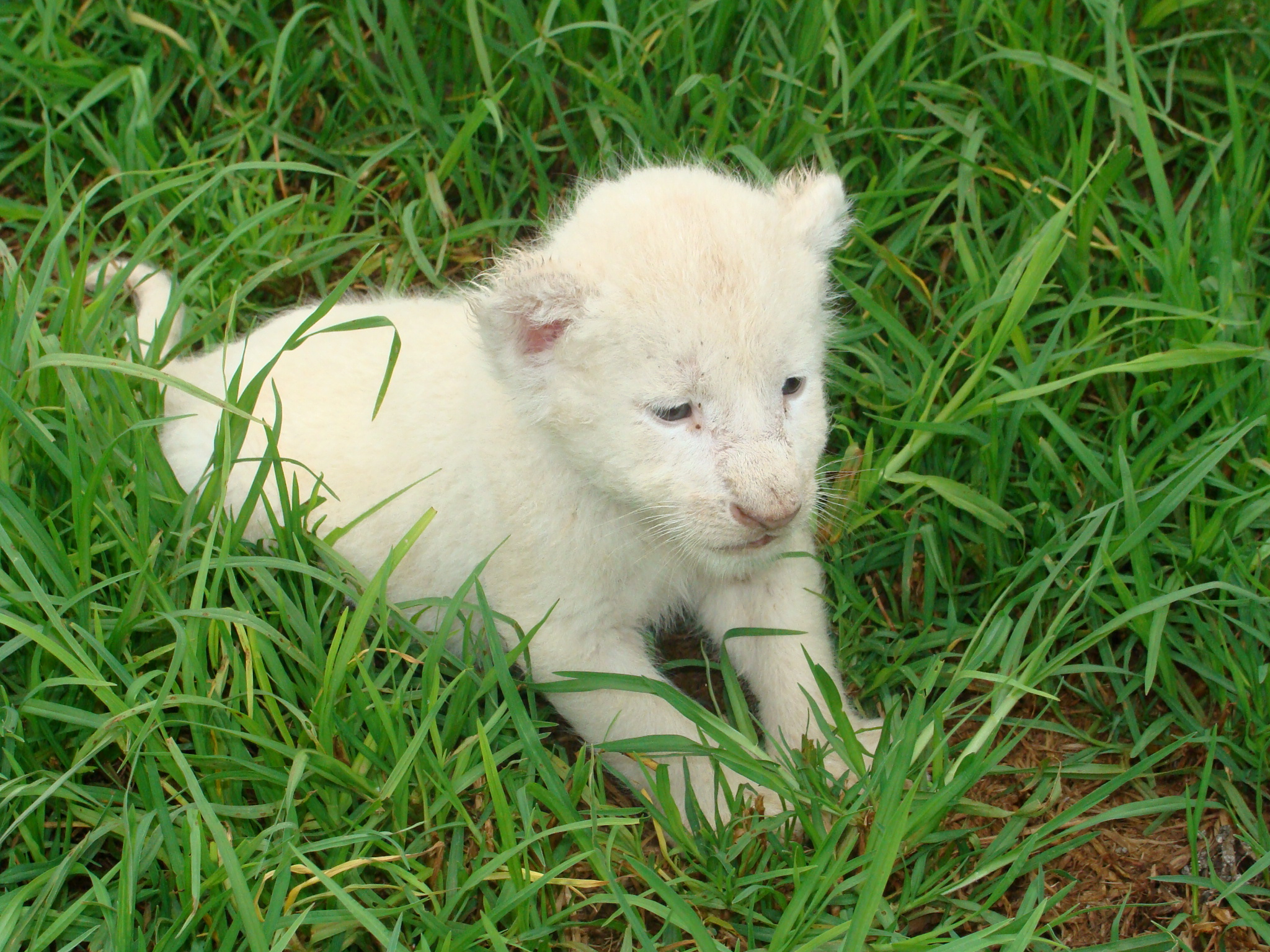
At Rhino and Lion Nature Reserve, Kromdraai

== White lions in captivity ==
A white lion breeding program has been established at Inkwenkwezi Private Game Reserve in South Africa's Eastern Cape province.

In the 1990s, four white lion cubs were born at the Papanack Park Zoo outside Ottawa. In 2016, a white lion named "Zeus" escaped from captivity, and was shot by zoo officials, due to the threat he posed to the public.

In March 2017, an attempt to smuggle white lions from Afghanistan to Pakistan was quashed. The origin of the lions was unclear at first, before Border Police Commander-General Ne'matullah Haidari (Note: Ḥaydar (Arabic: حَـيـدر) is a word for 'Lion'.) said that they were African. In April 2017, four of the lions were taken to Kabul Zoo, with the other two lions remaining in Kandahar Province.

=== Africa ===
==== Lory Park Zoo ====
Lory Park Zoo is currently in possession of two adult white lions (Daniel and Heidi), who have produced eight cubs. A litter of three cubs was born in 2012 and all three were hand-reared. A second litter of five cubs was born in 2013; three were removed for their own well-being while the remaining two (a male, Gabriel, and a female, Gazelle) were left with the parents. Both cubs are still with the parents and have not been handled by humans. A male cub was traded for other animals in August 2013 and now lives at the Hodonin Zoo in the Czech Republic.

==== Kruger and Umfolozi ====
In 1979, three litters containing white lions were recorded in Kruger National Park. In March, a female lion with three white cubs was observed near Tshokwane. In September, three white cubs (from two different lionesses) were seen. Another litter of white female cubs was captured from Kruger National Park and treated for sarcoptic mange. A white lion was observed in the Hluhluwe-Umfolozi Game Reserve in Zululand.

==== Rustenburg Wildlife Rehabilitation Center ====
In 2018, three-year-old Mufasa was in the process of being sold in South Africa after he was taken from an owner illegally keeping him as a pet. An anonymous buyer wanted both Mufasa and a female lion named Soraya, intending to protect both. Over 280,000 signed a petition asking that Mufasa not be auctioned, fearing a buyer might just want the lion for hunting.

=== Eurasia ===
The European Association of Zoos and Aquaria opposes the deliberate breeding of white lions.

==== West Midland Safari Park ====
In 2004, four white lions arrived at West Midland Safari Park, the only white lions in the United Kingdom. Mubuto, the male, and three lionesses (Marin, Natasha, and JoAnn; spellings undocumented) settled into the Kingdom of the White Lion exhibit at the park very well.

Newspapers and bloggers reported that the four cubs born at West Midland Safari Park, in 2008 had been sold to perform in a Japanese circus. It is alleged that the lions were given to British businessman Jim Clubb, who runs Amazing Animals, which also goes by the name Heythrop Zoological Gardens, in Chipping Norton, Oxfordshire. The animal rights organization Lion Aid, Ltd., quoted Mr. Clubb as saying, first, "No comment," then, "I've no idea if the West Midland Safari Park knew they were going to the circus, that's a matter for them." Bob Lawrence, the Head Keeper of West Midland Safari Park, who appears often in the YouTube videos raising the cubs, told the Worcester News, a local newspaper, that he "would never have supplied the four white lion cubs if he had known they would have ended up performing in a Japanese circus."

==== Wildheart Animal Sanctuary ====
There are 2 white lions at the sanctuary on the Isle of Wight: a male called Casper and a female called Frosty. The 2 lions were brought to the sanctuary from the West Midlands Safari Park, to live out the rest of their lives. They are not a breeding pair.

==== Jurques Zoo ====
In May 2007 four white lion cubs were born at Zoo de Jurques in France. The cubs consisted of one male and three females. However, they needed to be hand fed because their mother was not taking proper care of them, and they died a few weeks after their birth.

==== Magan Zoo, Abony ====
A private zoo in Abony, Hungary recently acquired two white lion cubs, one male and one female lion.

==== Belgrade Zoo ====
Belgrade Zoo in Serbia has 12 white lions. In 2010 four were born by two female lions, each weighing about 1.5 kg (3.3 pounds). Four additional white lions were born in April 2011. One more cub was born in October 2013, but died soon after.

==== Pafos Zoo ====
Pafos Zoo, an Animal and Bird wildlife park in Cyprus, received two seven-month-old white lion cubs, Zeus and Hera, in 2011. Eight years later, a white lion cub, Simba, was born to the pair.

==== Tbilisi Zoo ====
In December 2013, four white lion cubs were born at Tbilisi Zoo in Georgia. Cubs needed to be hand fed because their mother wasn't taking proper care of them. Another three cubs were born in May 2014.

==== Karachi Zoo ====
In 2012, the Karachi Zoo, Pakistan, purchased a juvenile male and juvenile female white lion. They have had 2 cubs. The male died in 2021.

==== Bukit Gambang Safari Park, Malaysia ====
The first white lions introduced into Malaysia was in March 2013 when the Safari Park in Bukit Gambang Resort City (Pahang) opened its door to the public. With 2 males and 3 females, the first white lion was born in May 2014 and was named King.

==== Wildlife Park of Sunway Lagoon, Malaysia ====
A couple of white lions named Zola and Zuri reside in the Sunway Lagoon's Wildlife Park since April 2015.

==== Singapore Night Safari ====
Singapore Night Safari, a subsidiary of Wildlife Reserves Singapore, recently acquired two white lions, a male and a female.

==== Taman Safari Indonesia ====
Taman Safari acquired six white lions from Canada in 2018.

==== Crimea Lion Park ====
A couple of white lions named Milady and Rocky were born at Taigan Lion Park in Crimea in March 2019.

=== Americas ===
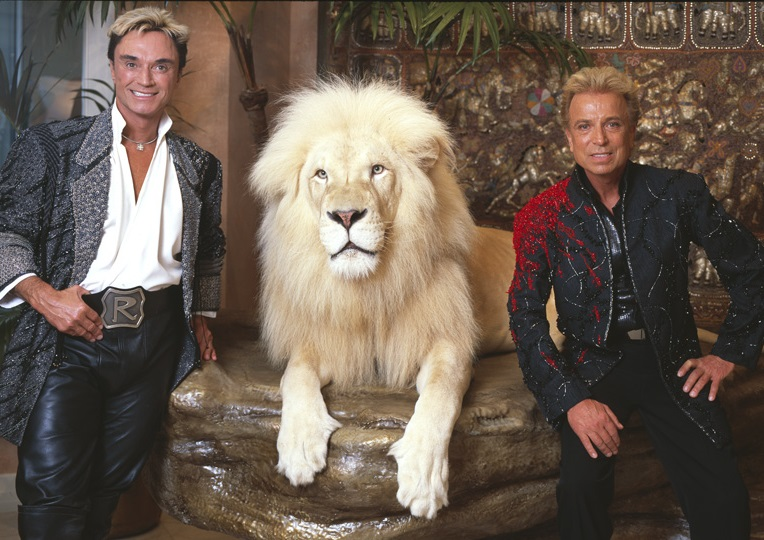
Performers Siegfried & Roy with their white lion

A couple of white lions in a playful mood; Otumba, Mexico

==== Plumpton Park Zoo ====
Plumpton Park Zoological Gardens in Rising Sun, Maryland, has two white lion siblings named Kimba and Jalla

==== Toronto Zoo ====
In 2012, Toronto Zoo in Canada received three white lions to their African zone and replacing the single white lioness the zoo had since 1996. In September 2015, four white lion cubs were born at the zoo.

==== Cincinnati Zoo ====
In 1998, Cincinnati Zoo in Ohio received two white lions from Siegfried & Roy's White Lion exhibit. Prosperity died on January 6, 2020, at the age of 22. Her female cub Gracious died at age 21 on March 3, 2022.

==== Reino Animal ====
Mexican zoo Reino Animal, located in Otumba, State of Mexico, also has a couple of white lions which can be seen at the "Safari Leones" (Lions' Safari).

==== The Wild Animal Sanctuary ====
The Wild Animal Sanctuary, located in Keenesburg, Colorado, has at times had white lions rescued from various for-profit zoos or other exploitative situations. All animals at the sanctuary live out the remainder of their lives in large open-air enclosures free from further exploitation.

==== Lake Tobias Wildlife Park ====
Lake Tobias Wildlife Park in Halifax, Pennsylvania, has two white lions residing with a tawny male African lion named Leo.

=== Oceania ===
==== National Zoo & Aquarium, Canberra ====
The National Zoo & Aquarium, Canberra, Australia is home to two white Lions, brother and sister, Jake and Mischka.

==== Kingdom of Zion ====
Kingdom of Zion, a private zoo in New Zealand, possesses six male white lions and four female white lions.

==== Mansfield Zoo ====
The Mansfield Zoo, Victoria, Australia has three white lions, one age 25 and two age 20 who are brothers from the same litter as the two in the National Zoo & Aquarium.

== In the wild within their natural endemic range ==
From the 1970s onwards, prized for their rarity, the white lions and many "normal" coloured (tawny) lions carrying the white lion gene were removed from the wild and put into captive breeding and hunting programs and sent to zoos and circuses around the globe. No adult white lion had been seen in their natural habitat after 1992. The Global White Lion Protection Trust (WLT) therefore initiated a re-establishment of white lions within their natural habitat in 2004, based on successful reintroduction techniques. The wild born offspring of rehabilitated white lions were integrated with resident wild tawny lions, and released through a soft release process. Three prides of white lions of high genetic integrity integrated with tawny lions have been successfully established, and are hunting self-sufficiently in their natural habitat, at a predation rate comparable to the wild tawny lions in the same habitat. The genetic marker determining the white colouration was identified in a collaborative study with 5 other countries in October 2013, and is being used to ensure genetic integrity and ultimately to determine the frequency of occurrence of the gene in the wild population.

The primary aim of the Global White Lion Protection Trust (WLT) is to harness the cultural importance of white lions to local indigenous communities, to help protect the Kruger to Canyon (K2C) Biosphere and the greater lion population in this region. This approach is based on the international precedent of the Kermode Bear (Ursus americanus kermodei) in British Columbia, whereby this rare, white variant of the American black bear (Ursus americanus) has been declared a critically endangered subspecies due to its conservation and cultural value, such that the Kermode Bear is being used as a flagship species for protecting a 4 million hectare wilderness area. As with the Kermode Bear, by protecting the white lions, their entire population within their endemic area would be protected.

Subsequently, white cubs were born in the Timbavati Private Nature Reserve in 2006, 2008, 2009, 2011, 2012 and 2013, and in the Nwanetsi Area of Kruger National Park in 2014 and 2015, confirming that white lions are a natural occurrence and the recessive gene is still present in the wild population.

In light of the recent decision by South Africa's Department of Environmental Affairs (DEA) at CITES 2016 to continue to allow the hunting of captive bred lions ("canned hunting"), and the trade in lion bones from captive bred lions, the Global White Lion Protection Trust (WLT) asserts that the survival of lions in the Greater Kruger Park Region is likely to come under threat, and the white lion is the ideal capstone animal to help better protect all lions in the Greater Kruger Park Region.

As the proposed policy stands for the management of lions in South Africa, the WLT asserts that the legalization of the lion bone trade will increase the supply and therefore demand of wild lion trophies and especially lion bones, increasing poaching and illegal hunting and threatening the future of wild lion populations in South Africa.

== Relationship with humans ==
=== Cultural significance ===
White lions first became known to the English-speaking world in 1977 through the book The White Lions of Timbavati. In traditional Shangaan/Tsonga beliefs, white lions are revered and honoured as deeply sacred and holy animals, sent to Earth as messengers of God and representatives of higher consciousness. In Shangaan/Tsonga belief, their appearance is linked to the need for human beings to realign with nature; serving as stewards of balance, respect, kindness, compassion and harmony towards all beings. White lions are seen as the guardians/protectors of the land. They are also seen as symbols of extreme purity and royalty. The white lions appeared in Mufasa: The Lion King, as the main antagonists.
