= Amadiba Crisis Committee =

South African social movement

The Amadiba Crisis Committee (ACC) is a social movement based in the Amadiba region of Pondoland in the Eastern Cape, in South Africa. It was formed in 2007 by villagers in and around Xolobeni to fight a proposed titanium mine in their area.

== Background ==
The Xolobeni village is situated on the Wild Coast in the Pondoland region of the Eastern Cape. During apartheid, the area where the Amadiba are situated was formerly known as the Transkei. It was the site of the 1950-1961 Pondo Revolt which challenged the introduction of the Bantu Authorities and the stealing of their land. It was one of the few regions of the Transkei that was able to resist apartheid government imposed headmen and chiefs, always insisting on choosing their own leadership. The Wild Coast is known for its natural beauty and for its natural coastline. It is a popular area for eco-tourism.

== Proposed mine ==
The proposed Xolobeni mine is a project by Transworld, a wholly owned subsidiary of Australian corporation Mineral Commodities (MRC). The area is estimated to contain about 348.7 million tonnes of ore grading 5%titanium and 139 million tonnes of titanium-bearing minerals making it potentially one of the biggest titanium mines in the country.

A study from the 2000s by the government of the Eastern Cape raised concerns about the potential environmental hazards caused by mining in the area, including the high water requirements which would require a tailings dam causing a significant impact to the local environment and local estuaries.

Residents in the Coastal Amadiba area have also raised concerns about the possible removal and relocation of their homesteads. About 200 households could be displaced from their homes and their farms as a result. The increased road traffic as a result of the mine and the effect on local eco-tourism which provides a significant amount of jobs in the area as also significant concerns of the ACC.

== Threats and assassinations ==
The ACC's opposition to the mine has been very controversial. A number of prominent leaders of the ACC have been threatened with assassination with one of its leaders being killed.

In March 2016, ACC chairperson Sikhosiphi Bazooka Rhadebe was assassinated by unknown gunmen. His family was also injured during the attack. After the incident, the Committee reported that "Rhadebe was shot eight times outside his house at about 7.30pm by two men who arrived at his home in a white vehicle with a blue rotating light on its roof". ACC spokesperson Nonhle Mbuthuma has also been the target of numerous death threats. This has been condemned by Amnesty International

== Opposition to N2 Wild Coast Toll Road ==
The Amadiba Crisis Committee has also spearheaded opposition to the proposed N2 Wild Coast Toll Route by the South African National Roads Agency that would cut through Coastal Amadiba land. ACC opposes the road because they claim it would divide its community in two, take away traditional communal land from homesteads as well as threaten the livelihood of community members. They also claim its part of a strategy to subsidise the proposed titanium mine by bringing a national road directly to the land where the mine is being proposed.

== Opposition to Shell's seismic surveys off the Wild Coast ==
The ACC has also been one of the key opponents of a controversial decision by South Africa's Department of Mineral Resources and Energy to award Shell exploration rights to conduct seismic surveys off the Wild Coast. They recently celebrated a victory when the High Court set aside the Department's 2014 decision putting a stop to any exploration for the foreseeable future.

== Threats ==
In early 2023 the organisation claimed that death threats had been made against two its leaders, Nonhle Mbuthuma and Thwesha Silangwe in relation to opposition to the planned N2 toll road that would run through communally owned and managed land.
