= Umqhele (album) =

Studio album by Sjava
- Released: December 14, 2018
- Genre: Afro-pop; African Trap; R&B
- Length: 60:30
- Label: Ambitiouz Entertainment
- Producer: Mace; Ruff

Sjava chronology
Isina Muva (2016)	Umqhele (2018)	Umsebenzi (2020)

Umqhele is the second studio album by South African singer and songwriter Sjava. It was released on December 14, 2018, by Ambitiouz Entertainment. The album was produced by Mace and Ruff.

Umqhele debuted at number one in South Africa. The album was named the most streamed South African album of all time by Apple Music.

== Background ==
In early December 2018, he teased the album and captioned, "#UMQHELE 14 DECEMBER 2018", via his Twitter account.

== Accolades ==
At the 25th South African Music Awards Umqhele won Best Afro Pop Album, Album of the Year, and nominated for Best Engineered Album.

Year	Nominee / work	Award	Result	Ref.
2019	Umqhele	Best Afro Pop Album	Won	
2019	Umqhele	Album of the Year	Won	
2019	Umqhele	Best Engineered Album	Nominated	

== Track listing ==
Disc 1
No.	Title	Length
1.	"Izitha (featuring Buhlebendalo)"	4:00
2.	"Abafazi"	5:46
3.	"Linda"	5:41
4.	"Amagama"	6:33
5.	"Eweni (featuring Anzo and Mzukulu)"	6:04
6.	"Isibhamu"	5:08
7.	"Confession"	6:16
8.	"Ikhandlela (featuring Fatso and Bongani Radebe)"	5:35
9.	"Wamuhle"	3:17
10.	"Umama"	4:00

Disc 2
No.	Title	Length
11.	"Ujesu (featuring Howard)"	5:39
12.	"Angik'deli"	5:44
13.	"Intombi-Yam"	4:11
14.	"Uyay'khohlisa"	4:08
15.	"Uvalo"	4:24
16.	"Gijima"	3:52
17.	"Xola (featuring Nue Sam)"	4:32
18.	"Ngiyabonga"	4:58
Total length:		60:30

== Personnel ==
Credits for Umqhele adapted from AllMusic.

- Mnqobi Nxumalo - Composer
- Buhlebendalo Mda - Composer
- Thabang Gomba - Composer
- Vuyo Manyike - Composer
- Tumisang Molefi - Composer
- Ruff Nkosi - Composer
- Sjava - Primary Artist
- Bheki Christopher Thobela - Composer

== Featured artists ==
- Buhlebendalo - (track 1)
- Anzo - (track 5)
- Mzukulu - (track 5)
- Bongani Radebe - (track 8)
- Fasto - (track 8)
- Howard - (track 11)
- Nue Sam - (track 17)

== Release history ==
List of release dates, showing region, formats, label, editions and reference
Region	Date	Format(s)	Label	Edition(s)	Ref.
South Africa	December 14, 2018	Digital download	Ambitiouz Entertainment	Standard	
