= Isina Muva =

Studio album by Sjava
- Released: 22 July 2016
- Length: 69:34
- Label: Ambitiouz Entertainment
- Producer: Ruff; Mthembeni Ndevu; Vuyo Manyike; Chris Kobedi; Thabang Gomba; Themba Sekowe

Sjava chronology
Isina Muva (2016)	Umqhele (2018)

Isina Muva is the debut studio album by South African singer-songwriter Sjava, released through Ambitiouz Entertainment on 22 July 2016.

The album was certified Gold in South Africa.

== Track listing ==
All tracks are written by Sjava

Standard edition track listing
No.	Title	Writer(s)	Producer(s)	Length
1.	"Amafu"	Jabulani Hadebe	Ruff Mfanafuthi	4:32
2.	"Baba" (featuring Saudi)	Hadebe, Anele Mbishe	Ruff	4:31
3.	"Before"	Hadebe, Vuyo Mnyike	Ruff	4:02
4.	"Uthando"	Hadebe	Ruff	4:06
5.	"Ek'seni"			5:07
6.	"Hlasela" (featuring A-Reece)	Hadebe, Lehlogonolo Ronald Mataboge	Ruff, Kobedi	4:49
7.	"Inhliziyo"	Hadebe, Manyike	Ruff, Manyike	3:30
8.	"Madludlu"	Hadebe, Sandisiwe Dludlu, Manyike	Ruff	4:56
9.	"Ngeke"	Hadebe, Manyike	Manyike	4:17
10.	"Seven"	Hadebe	Ruff	4:09
11.	"Siyolala"	Hadebe	Ruff	4:07
12.	"Valelise"	Hadebe	Ruff	4:16
13.	"Winter Nights"	Hadebe, Manyike	Ruff	4:22
14.	"Dali"	Hadebe, P-Jay	Ruff, Mthembeni Ndevu	4:22
15.	"Kulomhlaba"		Mnqobi Nxumalo	4:50
16.	"Ugogo"	Hadebe	Ruff	3:38
Total length:				69:34

Gold Deluxe bonus tracks
No.	Title	Writer(s)	Producer(s)	Length
17.	"Ngempela" (Sjava, DJ Maphorisa featuring Howard)	Hadebe, Thabang Gomba	Hadebe, Themba Sekowe, Gomba	3:48
18.	"December" (featuring Emtee)	Hadebe, Ndevu	Ruff	4:30
19.	"Impilo"	Hadebe, Ndevu	Ruff	4:39
Total length:				82:31

== Accolades ==
Isina Muva was nominated for Best New Artist, Best African Pop Album, Best Male Album and won Best Produced Album at the 16th Metro FM Music Awards.

Year	Nominee / work	Award	Result
2017	Isina Muva	Best Produced Album	Won
2017	Isina Muva	Best African Pop Album	Nominated
2017	Isina Muva	Best Male Album	Nominated
2017	Isina Muva	Best New Artist	Nominated

== Release history ==
List of release dates, showing region, formats, label, editions and reference
Region	Date	Format(s)	Label	Edition(s)	Ref.
South Africa	22 July 2016	Digital download; streaming	Ambitiouz Entertainment	Standard	
South Africa	20 July 2017	Digital download; streaming	Ambitiouz Entertainment	Gold Deluxe	
