= Sjava =

South African singer, rapper and actor (born 1984)

- Born: Jabulani Sihle Makhubo; 2 December 1983 (age 42); Bergville, KwaZulu-Natal, South Africa
- Occupations: Singer; rapper; songwriter; actor
- Years active: 2004–present
- Musical career
- Genres: African Trap Music (ATM); R&B; hip hop; Afro-pop
- Instruments: Vocals
- Labels: Ambitiouz Entertainment (former); 1020 Cartel; African Trap Movement
- Website: 1020cartel.com

Jabulani Sihle Makhubo (born 2 December 1983), known professionally as Sjava, is a South African singer, rapper, and actor. He began his acting career in 2005, starring in several drama series and films including uGugu no Andile (2009). He then rose to prominence on the drama series Zone 14, where he starred for three consecutive seasons, Isibaya and the second season of eHostela. Sjava ventured into the music industry and signed to record label Ambitiouz Entertainment. He gained mainstream popularity after he was featured on Miss Pru's acclaimed song "Ameni" in 2015.

Sjava's debut album, Isina Muva (2016), introduced his experimental sound which fuses African pop styles, hip hop and contemporary R&B. His second studio album, Umqhele, was released in 2018 to a critical acclaim. Umqhele, which continues with his fusion sound, grew his African-influenced image, and consolidated to other international regions (mainly in Africa). Before Umqhele, Sjava also released his debut EP, Umphako, in 2018.

Following departure with his former label Sjava, and Ruff co-founded 1020 Cartel, released his extended play Umsebenzi (2020), which was certified Gold in South Africa.

His third studio album Isibuko (2023), debuted number one and certified Platinum by the Recording Industry of South Africa (RiSA).

== Life and career ==
Jabulani Sihle Makhubo was born in Bergville, KwaZulu-Natal, the son of Thandi Nkabinde (his mother). He is of Zulu ancestry. Sjava has two older siblings, Sibusiso (his brother) and Sindy (his sister).

Sjava started writing music at an early age. While at the age of ten, Sjava was in charge of writing original lyrics on songs for his all-boy isicathamiya group Abafana baseMpumalanga, while in primary school. He then took composition of music a step further in high school, where he used to turn notes into songs, then teach them to his classmates.

=== Music ===
==== 2016–2017: Beginnings and Isina Muva ====
Sjava's debut recording was a feature on DJ and producer Miss Pru's "Ameni". The successful song also featured then-artists of record label Ambitiouz Entertainment; Emtee, Fifi Cooper, B3nchmarq, and Saudi – who is currently in the label.

On 8 April 2016, he released his debut single as a solo artist, "Ekuseni". He then released his debut album, Isina Muva on 22 July 2016. Its title is derived from a Zulu idiom meaning "late bloomer". Isina Muva was certified Gold by the Recording Industry of South Africa (RiSA) and Sjava celebrated by releasing a deluxe version of the album titled Isina Muva: Gold Deluxe The album earned Sjava an award at the 23rd South African Music Awards for Best Produced Album. It also won for a similar category at the 16th Metro FM Music Awards, and received four nominees: Best Afro Pop Album for Isina Muva, Best Male and Best New Artist. Also in 2017, Sjava recorded the theme song for the Mzansi Magic drama telenovela Isithembiso, which premiered on 3 April 2017.

==== 2017– 2019: Umphako and Umqhele ====
The film Black Panther was accompanied by a soundtrack album curated by rapper Kendrick Lamar, which Sjava appeared on. Sjava was featured on the song "Seasons", alongside rappers Mozzy and a TDE rapper Reason. The album was nominated at the 61st Annual Grammy Awards for Album of the Year, making it his first nominee at the ceremony for his appearance.

The lead single from Sjava's debut EP Umpakho, "Abangani" featuring Saudi and Emtee was released on 14 June 2018 accompanied by a video paying homage to their humble beginnings. On 24 June 2018, Sjava earned a BET Award for Best New International Act at the 2018 event. Umphako was released on 6 July 2018. The four-track project topped the iTunes local chart on its first day, and is described as Sjava asserting himself as an empathetic worker's champion.

Sjava's second studio album Umqhele was released on 14 December 2018. The album's lead single "Umama", was released seven days before the album was available. "Umama" later spawned a version on the global music platform COLORS, where he was featured performing the song on 13 May 2019. Umqhele atopped the iTunes local chart and received positive reviews from critics.

On 23 November 2019, Sjava bagged Best Male Artist in Southern Africa award at 2019 All Africa Music Awards.

On 26 May 2020, Sjava announced via social media that he has departed his label, Ambitiouz Entertainment. He expressed gratitude towards the label for giving him an "opportunity and platform when no one did".

=== 2020-2025: 1020 Cartel, Umsebenzi EP, Isibuko, Ukhamba ===
Following departure with Ambitiouz Entertainment, Sjava self signed to his record deal 1020 Cartel and released his Extended Play Umsebenzi on 14 December 2020. The EP was certified with gold plaque.

Sjava appeared on a collaboration "10k" with South African band Mafikizolo released on 10 June 2022.

In December 2022, he announced his third studio album Isibuko, which was released 27 January 2023. It features guests such as Shwi, Saudi, Emtee, Sampa the Great, Delayde, Lolli Native, Qwabe Twins, Umzukulu, Umzulu Phaqa, Udumakahle, Anzo, Vernotile, Inkos' Yamagcokama, and Nontokozo Mkhize.

The song "Isoka" featuring Q Twins and Mzukulu charted number 1 on Metro FM Top 30 for two consecutive weeks.

Sjava & Big Zulu worked on their joint album Ukhamba, as Inkabi Zezwe. Album's lead single "Umbayimbayi" was released on 24 March 2023 and debuted number one on Top 100 South Africa. The song was certified 3× Platinum in South Africa.

In October 2023, Sjava contested with Focalistic at Red Bull Sound Clash South Africa and won the title held at Sun Arena, Time Square.

Towards the end of July 2024, he announced his upcoming The 2016 Tour, to promote his debut studio album Isina Muva. It will commerce on 27-29 September, Joburg Theatre, follows 1-2 November, Play House Theatre, other dates will be announced.

During his tour in December 2024, Sjava announced his live extended play Inkanyezi, released on January 31, 2025.

In early December 2025, Sjava announced his studio album INkanyezi NeZinkanyezi, released on January 30, 2026.

=== 2026-present: The Trap Temptations ===
Sjava, Emtee, Saudi and Ruff released their collaborative studio album The Trap Temptations, on June 16, 2026. The album ammassed 1.3 million streams within 2 days of its release.

=== Endorsement ===
In July 2024, Sjava announced partnership with Omega as the brand ambassador.

=== Television ===
From 2005 to 2013, Sjava enrolled to acting. He appeared on several television shows; including Zone 14, Generations and Soul City and 7de Laan, uGugu and Andile, Isibaya. In August 2020, he landed on a small role on Uzalo and eHostela season 2.

In March 2023, Sjava bagged acting role of Prince Mkhuseli Khahlamba in Queendom.

== Discography ==
=== Studio albums ===
List of studio albums, with selected information
Title	Album details	Certification
Isina Muva	Released: 22 July 2016; Label: Ambitiouz Entertainment; Formats: CD, Digital download	RISA: Gold
Umqhele	Released: 14 December 2018; Label: Ambitiouz Entertainment; Formats: CD, Digital download	
Isibuko	Released: 27 January 2023; Label: 1020 Cartel; Formats: Streaming, Digital download	RiSA: Platinum

=== Collaborative studio albums ===
List of studio albums, with selected information
Title	Album details	Certification
The Trap Temptations	Released: 16 June 2026; Label: 1020 Cartel, Emtee Records, OVLOE Monopoly; Formats: Streaming, Digital download	

=== Extended plays ===
List of extended plays, with selected information
Title	EP details	Certification
Umphako	Released: 6 July 2018; Label: Ambitiouz Entertainment; Formats: Digital download	
Umsebenzi	Released: 4 December 2020; Label: 1020 Cartel; Formats: Digital download, Streaming	RiSA: Gold
Inkanyezi (Live)	Released: 31 January 2025; Label: 1020 Cartel; Formats: Streaming, digital download	
Inkanyezi 2.0 (Live)	Released: 5 September 2025; Label: 1020 Cartel; Formats: Streaming, digital download	

=== Guest appearances ===
Title	Year	Other artist(s)	Album
"Broken Promises"	2024	Bravo Le Roux, Benjaman	Igazi, Iinyembezi Nombilo (Deluxe)

== Singles ==
=== As lead artist ===
List of singles as lead artist, with selected chart positions and certifications, showing year released and album name
Title	Year	Peak chart positions	Certifications	Album
Title	Year	ZA	Certifications	Album
"Mngani" (Darque, Sjava)	2023	—		More Life
"Umbayimbayi" (Sjava, Big Zulu)	2023	1	3× Platinum	Ukhamba
"Ingunaphakade" (Zaba, Sjava)	2023	—		Non-album single
"Umntu" (Sjava, Bravo Le Roux)	2023	—		Igazi, Iinyembezi Nombilo
"Ngibongiseni"	2024	—		Isibuko (Deluxe)
"Tholakuwe" (Herc Cut The Lights, Sjava, Blxckie featuring Young Stunna )	2024	—		Non-album single
"Love is still a answer" (Mawat, Soweto Gospel Choir, Sjava, Lebo Sekgobela, Masandi, Mariechan)	2024	—		Non-album single
"—" denotes a recording that did not chart or was not released in that territory.

== Other charted and certified songs ==
List of other charted songs, with selected chart positions and certifications, showing year released and album name
Title	Year	Peak chart positions	Certifications	Album
Title	Year	ZA	Certifications	Album
"God Laughs" (A-Reece featuring Sjava, Shekhinah)	2023	16		P2: The Big Hearted Bad Guy
"Isoka" (Sjava featuring Mzukulu, Qwabe Twins)	2023	3	2× Platinum	Isibuko
"Typhoon" (Sjava featuring Sastii, LaCabra, Lowfeye & Blue Pappi)	2024	12	Platinum	Isibuko
"Uvalo" (Usimamane featuring Sjava)	2024	1		20th: Days Before Maud
"Uyena"	2025	6		Inkanyezi
"Kuye"	2025	12		Inkanyezi
"Sleepover"	2025	19		Inkanyezi
"—" denotes a recording that did not chart or was not released in that territory.

== Awards and nominations ==
Sjava awards and nominations
Awards and nominations
Award	Wins	Nominations
Metro FM Music Awards	1	10
South African Music Awards	4	7
DStv Mzansi Viewers Choice Awards	1	1
BET Awards	1	1
South African Traditional Music Awards	0	1
GQ Awards	1	

Totals (Note: Certain award groups do not simply award one winner. They acknowledge several different recipients, have runners-up, and have third place. Since this is a specific recognition and is different from losing an award, runner-up mentions are considered wins in this award tally. For simplification and to avoid errors, each award in this list has been presumed to have had a prior nomination.)
- Wins: 8
- Nominations: 22

=== All Africa Music Awards ===
Year	Nominee / work	Award	Result	Ref.
2021	Himself	Best Male Artist in African Inspirational Music	Nominated	

=== African Muzik Magazine Awards ===
Year	Nominee / work	Award	Result
2023	Himself	Best Male Southern Africa	Nominated

=== GQ Awards ===
Year	Nominee / work	Award	Result	Ref.
2025	Herself	Men of the Year	Won	

=== Metro FM Music Awards ===
Year	Nominee / work	Award	Result
2017	Isina Muva	Best Male	Nominated
2017	Isina Muva	Best New Artist	Nominated
2017	Isina Muva	Best Afro Pop Album	Nominated
2017	Isina Muva	Best Produced Album	Won
2023	"Isoka"	Best Collaboration	Nominated
2023	"Isoka"	Song of the Year	Nominated
2023	"Isoka"	Artist of the Year	Nominated
2023	Isibuko	Best Afro Soul Pop	Nominated
2023	Himself	Best Styled Artist	Nominated
2023	Himself	Artist of the Year	Nominated
2023	Himself	Best Male Artist	Nominated

=== South African Music Awards ===
Year	Nominee / work	Award	Result
2017	Isina Muva	Best Produced Album	Won
2019	Umqhele	Album of the Year	Won
2019	Himself	Male Artist of the Year	Nominated
2019	Umqhele	Best Engineered Album of the Year	Nominated
2019	Umqhele	Best Afro Pop Album	Won
2021	Umsebenzi	Best Adult Contemporary Album	Nominated
2025	Isibuko	Male Artist of the Year	Nominated
2025	Isibuko	Album of the Year	Nominated
2025	Isibuko	Best Produced Album	Nominated
2025	Isibuko	Best Engineered Album	Nominated
2025	Isibuko	Best Afro pop Album	Won

=== South African Traditional Music Awards ===
Year	Nominee / work	Award	Result	Ref.
2021	Umsebenzi	Best Male Artist/Group	Nominated	

=== DSTV Mzansi Viewers' Choice Awards ===
Year	Nominee / work	Award	Result
2017	Himself	Rising Star	Won

=== BET Awards ===
Year	Nominee / work	Award	Result
2018	Himself	Best New International Act	Won
