= South African Traditional Music Awards =

- Current: 15th SATMA
- Sponsored by: SABC
- Date: 2006
- Country: South Africa
- Related: South African Music Awards

The South African Traditional Music Awards (SATMA Awards) are an annual award ceremony. SATMA Awards are about celebrating music made in the style of the people and various language groups of South Africa. Founded by Dumisani Goba, The awards aim to "eliminate tribalism and other divisive measures"; the official slogan is "My Culture, Your Culture, One Nation".

The National Heritage Council were fundraisers and overseers for the SATMAs from 2008-2010; this role was then taken over by the SATMA Awards Foundation.

== SATMA Awards 2014 Day One Categories ==
Category	Nominee	Work nominated	Result
Best Isicathamiya album	Kholwa Brothers	Asenze Umehluko	Nominated
Best Isicathamiya album	Ntokozo Brothers	Mama wami	Nominated
Best Isicathamiya album	Ladysmith Black Mambazo	Abafana Bezamanani Musani ukumkhuluma	Nominated
Best Isicathamiya album	Beautiful Stars	Waduma Ngo Gogo	Nominated
Best Isicathamiya album	New Try singers	khetha ukuthula	Won
Best Isicathamiya album	High Stars	Sizinsizwa Thina	Nominated
Best Video Song	Mlethwa Majola	Nomi’yiphi	Won
Best Video Song	Thabisa	The journey	Nominated
Best Video Song	Phoka Moloi	phoka hlabeng tsa buthabuthe vol3	Nominated
Best Video Song	Jessica Mbangeni	Africa Trubute to Nelson Rholihlahla Mandela	Nominated
Best poet	Ravhalusani Ratshitanga	Tata Mandela Senzokhaya Umhayi Zibondwe Zayekwa Maboys Buya	Nominated
Best poet	Ndumiso Maphumulo	Ze Ningondle	Won
Best poet	David Leshomo	Poko Le molodi wa setswana	Nominated
Best poet	Amatshatangubo	Kwathulumoya	Nominated
Best poet	Vendaboy Poet	Rrrrrrrrrr	Nominated
Best Newcomer artist	Dinatla Tsa	Ngwao Tsa koma	Nominated
Best Newcomer artist	Thembeka Wittes	Ezamilingacambu	Nominated
Best Newcomer artist	Ke itumetse		Nominated
Best Newcomer artist	Ezika-bhaka	Thayi lemoto	Nominated
Best Newcomer artist	Matlapineng	O bo bone botshelo	Nominated
Best Newcomer artist	Makhongela	Xi French	Nominated
Best Newcomer artist	Maaparankwe	E gatile bogole kae?	Nominated
Best Newcomer artist	Dr Bone	Lindelani	Nominated
Best Newcomer artist	Zola Soul	Thando Lokwenene	Nominated
Best Newcomer artist	HA Makhubele	Mukonwana vol1	Nominated
Best Newcomer artist	Brain Bomber	Tsalelani	Nominated
Best Newcomer artist	Moipone(Nomtiti wa boraro)	Ke Ntidiate	Nominated
Best Newcomer artist	Uqhoshangokwenzakwakhe	Apoint 2 prove	Won
Best Newcomer artist	Madanono	Ubudukluduklu	Nominated
Best Traditional Dance group	Tolodi ya dikgaga cultural group		Nominated
Best Traditional Dance group	Serantlhatlha arts Ensemble		Won
Best Traditional Dance group	Thagamoso cultural group		Nominated
Best Traditional Dance group	Serube Sa Ngwao		Nominated
Best Traditional Dance group	Sananapo trad dance group		Nominated
Best Traditional Dance group	Indlondlo Zulu Dancers		Nominated
Best Traditional Dance group	Zamani Zulu Dance Group		Nominated
Best Traditional Dance group	Totoba		Nominated
Best Traditional Dance group	Amaviyo		Nominated
Best Traditional Dance group	Ubuhle Bamangwane		Nominated
Best African Jazz Album	Freddy Moroamoche	Mohlake	Nominated
Best African Jazz Album	De Makhotla	Maftown blies	Nominated
Best African Jazz Album	Morayks	Lesotho	Won
Best African Jazz Album	Movi M Movi M		Nominated
Best African Jazz Album	Quincy K	Remembrance	Nominated
Best African Jazz Album	Lindiwe Maxolo	Time	Nominated
Best African Jazz Album	Lucky Vincent	Dikgaga tsa magaga	Nominated
Best African Jazz Album	Prince Nyadzwela	The Project	Nominated
Best African Jazz Album	Selqelo Selota	The Promise	Nominated
Best Praise Singer	Wise and Sbo	Ivangeli	Won
Best Praise Singer	Sijadu Ndimlo		Nominated
Best Praise Singer	Dithaga	tsa ga mme halenyane Moulu wa pitse	Nominated
Best Praise Singer	Vendaboy poet	Rrrrrrrr	Nominated
Best Praise Singer	Jessica Mbangeni	Igoli	Nominated
Best Vernecular Hip Hop Album	Proheed	Vengo	Nominated
Best Vernecular Hip Hop Album	Sisco Tee	Itjhoba lama tjhoba	Nominated
Best Vernecular Hip Hop Album	Team virus	Motswako university	Nominated
Best Vernecular Hip Hop Album	Zuluboy	Crisis Management	Nominated
Best Vernecular Hip Hop Album	Siyabulela	Isxaka mlomo	Nominated
Best Vernecular Hip Hop Album	Dr Bone	Lindelani	Won
Best Vernecular Hip Hop Album	Dee Q B4E	Bolatse	Nominated
Best Vernecular Hip Hop Album	Staggie G	Motswakolista	Nominated
Best Mbaqanga Album	Sandile Khwela	Insimbi	Won
Best Mbaqanga Album	Mthokozisi Kumalo	Uqo	Nominated
Best Mbaqanga Album	Abakezeli	Umshando	Nominated
Best Afro Soul Album	Luanga Choba	Launga who?	Nominated
Best Afro Soul Album	Funi Ndi	Tshifhinga	Nominated
Best Afro Soul Album	Musa	The Dream	Won
Best Afro Soul Album	Swazi Dlamini	Soul of Me	Nominated
Best Afro Soul Album	Naima Kay	Umsebenzi	Nominated
Best Afro Soul Album	Nokwazi	Ilambu	Nominated
Best Afro Soul Album	Zahara	Phendula	Nominated
Best Afro Soul Album	Ntando	Monday to Sunday	Nominated
Best Afro Soul Album	T Girl	Ingoma Kamkhulu	Nominated
Best Raggae Album	Unathi Njamela	Nyuva dem	Nominated
Best Raggae Album	Humbulani Ramagwedzha	Ndikhodiphina ndina inwi	Nominated
Best Raggae Album	Jah soldiers	Nndededze	Nominated
Best Raggae Album	One people Band	In memory of lucky Dube	Nominated
Best Raggae Album	Lumodi Woman	Woman President	Won
Best Female Album	Buselaphi Gijima	Ntuthwane	Nominated
Best Female Album	Mmaphuti Le Maserole	Theletsa Melodi	Nominated
Best Female Album	Luanga Choba	Luanga who?	Nominated
Best Female Album	No jefrey	Sithasami	Nominated
Best Female Album	Naima Kay	Umsebenzi	Nominated
Best Female Album	Zahara	Phendula	Nominated
Best Female Album	Mmaausi	Siile Sebatana	Nominated
Best Female Album	Jessica Mbangeni	Igoli	Won
Best Female Album	Salphina Kadiaka	Success	Nominated
Best Female Album	Sunglen Chabalala	Mbyana ya flora	Nominated
Best Female Album	Moipone(Nomtiti wa boraro)	Ke Ntidiate	Nominated
Best Female Album	Botlhale Boikanyo	Spoken words & music	Nominated
Best Male Album	Imfeze’Emnyama	Palesa	Won
Best Male Album	Lungelo Yilana	Ocijimpi	Nominated
Best Male Album	Usonkingana Namawelana		Nominated
Best Male Album	Ikoloy’amasotja		Nominated
Best Male Album	Amatshatangubo	Kwathula’moya	Nominated
Best Male Album	Ithwasa langempela Ithwasa langempela		Nominated
Best Male Album	Percy Mfana	Mbyana ya makhelwana	Nominated
Best Male Album	Mr Post	Hambanyisa tilo na misava	Nominated
Best Male Album	Abafana bakamgqumeni	I breakdown	Nominated
Best Male Album	Maqhinga Radebe	Ifacebook	Nominated

== SATMA Awards 2014 Day Two Categories ==
- Best Xitsonga Album - Joe Shirimani – Ka Tika
- Best Tshivenda Album - Tycoon 4 Sho – Vhutshilo
- Best Indian Album -Flash Entertainers – Flash 45
- Best SiSwati Album - Zandi N – Hlala Ngent’fombi
- Best IsiNdebele Album -Amatshatangubo – Kwathula’moya
- Best SePedi Album - Julia Aphane – Serurubele/Butterfly
- Best Cultural Talk Show - Melumzi Xego – Forte FM
- Best SeSotho Album - Motho oa maloro mabe fanini No2 – Motho Oa Maloro Mabe Fanini
- Best Boeremusiek Album - Willie Jooster – Treklavier Treffers
- Best IsiXhosa Album - Jessica Mbangeni – Igoli
- Best San Album - Paulus – Mapondo
- Best SeTswana Album -Serantlhatlha Arts Ensemble – Serope Mperekele
- Best Maskandi Album - Amageza Amahle – Isisu Somkhwenyana
- Most Downloaded Song - Ezika-bhaka – Thayi Lemoto
- Best Music Radio Program - Umhlobo Wenene – Lavutha Ibhayi
- Song of the Year -
- Best Traditional DJ - Saba Mbixane
- Best Radio Station - Umhlobo wenene
- Founders Awards -

== Ceremonies ==
#	Date	Multiple wins	Host(s)	Venue	Ref.
1	2006			Durban ICC Arena	
2	2007			Durban ICC Arena	
3	2008	Mtshengiseni Gcwensa (3 awards)		Durban ICC Arena	
4	2009			Durban ICC Arena	
9	2014		Zolisa Xaluva	University of Fort Hare, Eastern Cape	
15	2021	Qwabe Twins (3 awards)	Tsholofelo Maseko Mduduzi Ntuli	Mbombela Stadium, Mpumalanga	
16	2022	Nombika Black Boyz (2 awards)		Mbombela Stadium, Mpumalanga	

== Categories ==
=== Current categories ===
- Best Male Artist/Group
- Best Female Artist/Group
- Best Afro Soul Song
- Best African Jazz Song
- Best Reggae Album
- Best Traditional Praise Singer
- Best Indigenous Poet
- Best Upcoming Artist/Group
- Best Traditional Accapella Music Song
- Best Traditional Music Community Radio Presenter
- Best Department of Art & Culture
- Best Department Cultural Affairs Chief Director
- Best Traditional Producer
- Best Traditional House Music Song
- Best SePedi Artist/Group
- Best TshiVenda Artist/Group
- Best Xitsonga Artist/Group
- Best Ndebele Artist/Group
- Best IsiXhosa Artist/Group
- Best SeTswana Artist/Group
- Best Siswati Artist/Group
- Best Indian Artist/Group
- Best Sesotho Artist/Group
- Best Boeremusiek Artist/Group
- Best Zulu Artist/Group(Traditional/Digital)
- Best Traditional Collaboration Song
- Best Traditional Music Artist/Group of the year
