= Death of Sikhosiphi Rhadebe =

2016 assassination in South Africa

Sikhosiphi Rhadebe
- Other names: Bazooka
- Occupation: Activist

Sikhosiphi Rhadebe, also known as Bazooka, was an activist who was chairperson of the Amadiba Crisis Committee (ACC), an organisation campaigning against mining in Xolobeni in the Pondoland region of the Eastern Cape province of South Africa.

== Death and aftermath ==
He was assassinated on 22 March 2016 when men posing as police shot him multiple times, and as of 2018 there were no arrests in his death. It has been claimed that the police sabotaged the investigation.

While mining has a history of violence in general, Perth-based Mineral Commodities Limited (MRC), a mining company planning to mine the area, denied any link to the murder.

== See also ==
- List of unsolved murders (2000–present)
- Political assassinations in post-apartheid South Africa
- Political repression in post-apartheid South Africa
