= Wild Coast Region, Eastern Cape =

Section of the coast of the Eastern Cape, South Africa

Coordinates: 31°37′S 29°32′E

Location of the Wild Coast Region

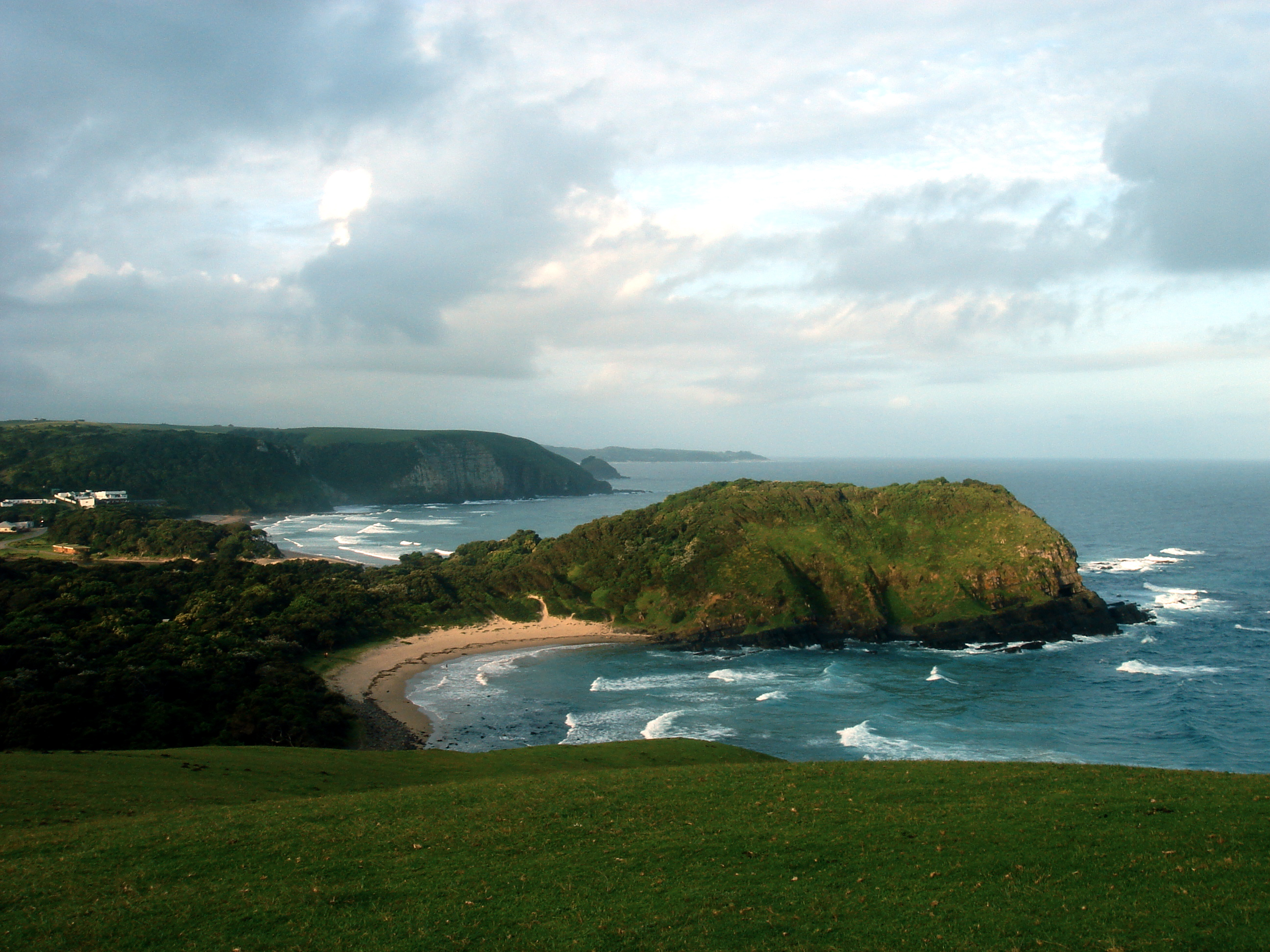
Coffee Bay, Wild Coast

The Wild Coast is a section of the coast of the Eastern Cape, a province of South Africa. The region stretches from East London in the south to the border of KwaZulu-Natal in the north. It is the traditional home of the Xhosa (Gcaleka, Thembu, Mpondo, and Bomvana), and the birthplace of many prominent South Africans, including Nelson Mandela, Winnie Mandela, Zwelonke Sigcawu, Xolilizwe Sigcawu, Oliver Tambo and Thabo Mbeki.

The Wild Coast is crossed by the N2 National Road.

== History ==
The Wild Coast from the Great Kei River to the Mtamvuna River was part of the former homeland of the Transkei during the Apartheid era.

In 1986, a bombing occurred at Wild Coast Casino in Mbizana Local Municipality.

== Geography ==
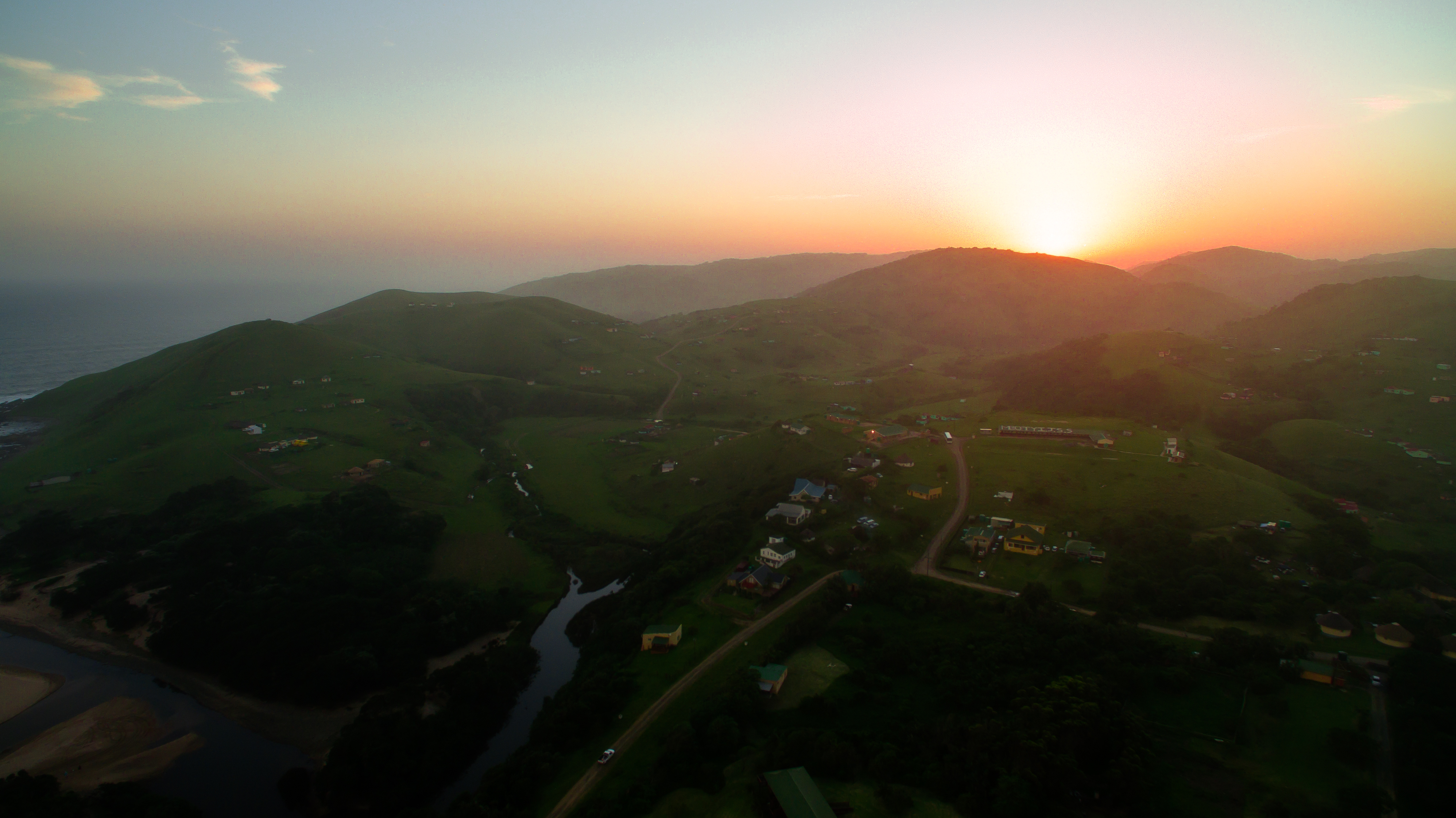
An aerial view of the Wild Coast at dusk.

Many rivers empty into the sea along the Wild Coast. In the southernmost parts of the region, where the hills are lower, the rivers tend to be mature and are characterized by wide floodplains. But in the rugged north, where young rivers find their path to the sea blocked by massive cliffs, many, like Waterfall Bluff, leap over the rocky crags into the surf below.

Small sandy bays and long stretches of open beaches are often found near the mouths of large rivers, such as the Kei, Mthatha, Mbashe and Mzimvuba. There are also many smaller rivers which, owing to their protected sources in the coastal forests, have much less siltation than the larger rivers, which drain vast tracts of land where poor farming practices are in place. Estuaries, bays and headlands are plentiful, whilst rocky shores predominate, be they smooth wave-cut platforms with jagged and un-even surfaces or precipitous cliffs that plunge into the sea.

About half the coastline comprises indigenous forest and many forest species that were previously unknown to science have been discovered in places such as Umtamvuna and Mkambati. About 900 forest and grassland species from the Wild Coast region have been identified as having commercial, traditional or homeopathic value.

== Climate ==
The average daily temperatures along the coast vary from 17 °C to 28 °C in January and 9 °C to 21 °C in July

== Tourism ==
The scenic beauty of the Wild Coast, coupled with its rich cultural heritage, make the region ideal for the development of a strong tourism industry. In fact, tourism has been identified as one of the cornerstones of the proposed Wild Coast Spatial Development Initiative. But the virtual collapse of local administrations and environmental threats like the proposed Xolobeni mine dune mining project and the proposed N2 Wild Coast Toll Road are some of the major issues that will have to be tackled by this initiative. The challenge will be to bring about much-needed investment and development that will benefit local communities and the region as a whole without compromising the rich natural resource base.

The controversy over the titanium mine project, one opposed by many of the area's indigenous tribal people, is explored in the prize-winning 2014 documentary "The Shore Break" by South African filmmaker Ryley Grunenwald. In 2024, local activists Sinegugu Zukulu and Nonhle Mbuthuma won the Goldman Environmental Prize for their campaigning against oil drilling on the Wild Coast.

The Wild Coast Jikeleza Route near East London is host to the 100 km^{2} Inkwenkwezi Private Game Reserve. The nearby coastal village of Cintsa is also a popular tourist destination.

Other popular tourist towns and villages along the Wild Coast include Port St Johns, Coffee Bay, Hole-in-the-Wall, Qolora Mouth, Kei Mouth, Morgan Bay, and Haga Haga.

The region also hosted the 8th season of the reality game show Survivor South Africa, subtitled Immunity Island, and the adjoining Sunshine Coast hosted the 9th, Return of the Outcasts, due to the COVID-19 pandemic preventing international production.

== See also ==
- Maputaland-Pondoland bushland and thickets – Montane shrubland ecoregion in South Africa
