= Bizana =

Mbizana Bizana
- Location within Eastern Cape Location within South Africa
- Coordinates: 30.851°S 29.838°E
- Country: South Africa
- Province: Eastern Cape
- District: Alfred Nzo
- Municipality: Winnie Madikizela-Mandela Local Municipality

Area
  - Total: 24.13 km^{2} (9.32 sq mi)

Population (2011)
  - Total: 7,974
  - Density: 330.5/km^{2} (855.9/sq mi)

Racial makeup (2011)
  - Black African: 98.5%
  - Coloured: 0.6%
  - Indian/Asian: 0.3%
  - White: 0.2%
  - Other: 0.4%

First languages (2011)
  - Xhosa: 90.3%
  - Zulu: 3.2%
  - English: 2.8%
  - Other: 3.8%
- Time zone: UTC+2 (SAST)
- PO box: 4800
- Area code: 039

Mbizana, also known as Bizana (before 2013), is a town in the Eastern Cape province of South Africa. It is the seat of the Winnie Madikizela-Mandela Local Municipality.

Winnie Mandela, ex-wife of Nelson Mandela, was born here in 1936. Oliver Reginald Tambo (popularly known as OR Tambo which the international airport in Johannesburg is named after) was also born and grew up in this town. The town has many surrounding villages.

== Entertainment and nature ==
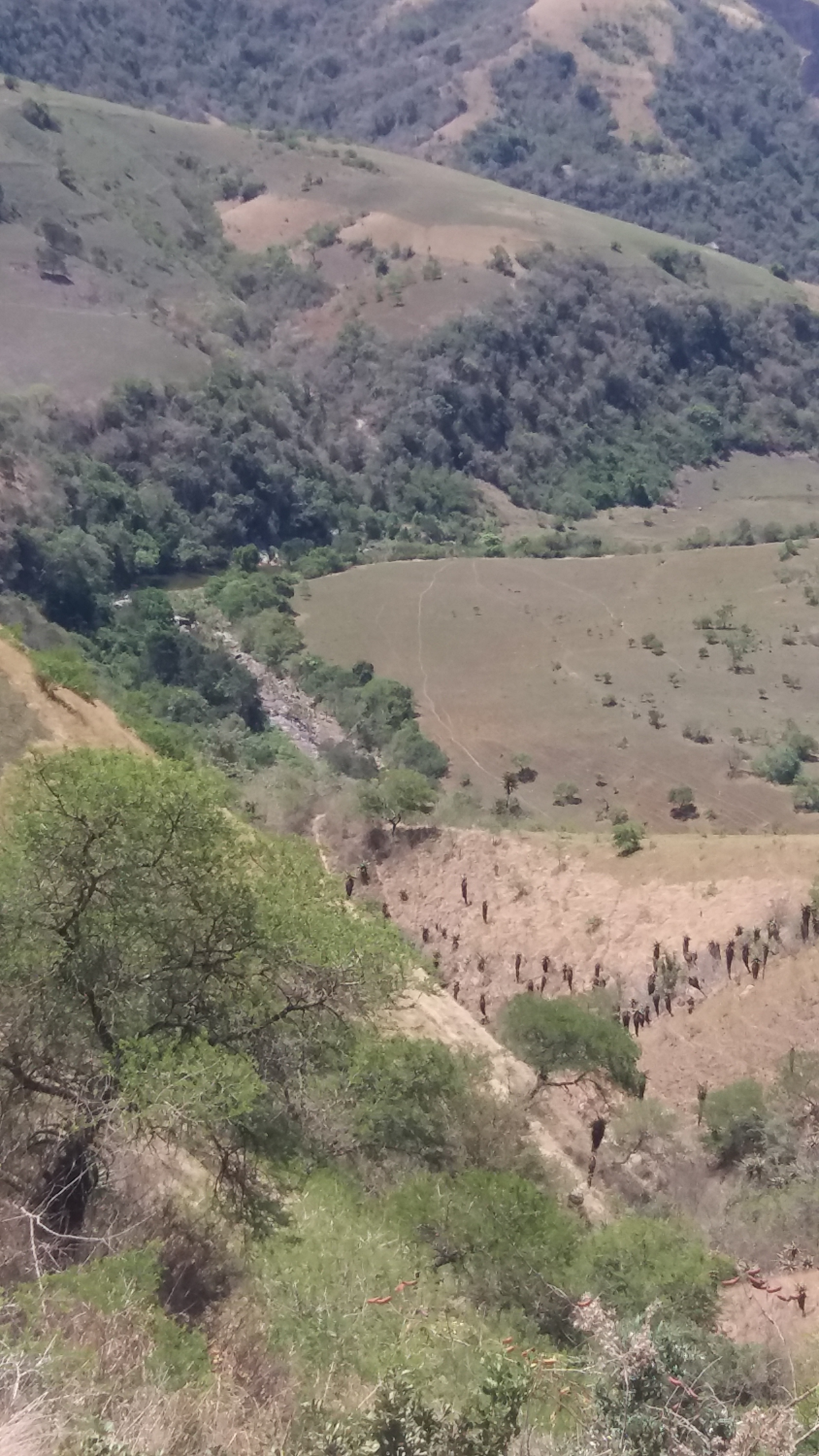
Mbizana rurals

The Wild Coast Sun casino and hotel by Sun international group is in the Alfred Nzo District, situated 56,6 kilometres from the town. The Wild Coast Sun hosted Idols SA theatre week in 2016 and 2017. Mbizana is in the Wild coast area and has beautiful beaches. One of them is Silver Beach, a beautiful and peaceful beach in the Xholobeni area, where a hotel complex is located. The controversial Xolobeni mine has been proposed to mine the area's titanium reserves.

Mbizana is on the border between KwaZulu-Natal and the Eastern Cape. The population is predominantly Xhosa.

== Hospitals ==
Mbizana has a provincial hospital, the Oliver and Adelaide Tambo Regional Hospital. The Greenville hospital, in the eTyeni area of Imizizi Administrative area, was originally developed by the Roman Catholic church in 1900. Greenville has been the subject of community protests after years of neglect.

== 1986 bombing ==
On 18 April 1986, two people were killed and several others injured when a bomb, set by Phumzile Mayaphi, exploded at the Wild Coast Casino near Bizana. Mayaphi, an MK operative, was charged and convicted of murder and sabotage, and was sentenced to death (some sources say to 18 years) on 12 May 1989. Mayaphi was released as a political prisoner in 1990.

== Culture ==
- Mbizana Cultural Village

== Transport ==
The R61 is the major route running through Mbizana, bypassing the town to the south. It runs roughly SE to S from Port Edward in KwaZulu-Natal to Flagstaff.

== Notable people ==
- Babalo Madikizela – Eastern Cape MEC for Public Works
- Nandipha Magudumana – celebrity doctor
- Oliver Tambo – Anti-Apartheid Movement activist & President of the African National Congress
- Siphosakhe Ntiya-Ntiya – footballer
- Winnie Madikizela-Mandela – Anti-Apartheid Movement activist, president of the African National Congress Women's League & former wife of Nelson Mandela
- Sinegugu Zukulu – Environmental activist and winner of the 2024 Goldman Environmental Prize
