= 1020 Cartel =

South African record label

- Founded: 2019 (7 years ago)
- Founder: Sjava, Ruff
- Genre: African trap movement, Afro pop
- Country of origin: South Africa
- Location: Johannesburg, South Africa
- Official website: 1020cartel.com

1020 Cartel is a South African independent record label established in 2019 by Sjava and Ruff.

Since its formation, the label has signed and released projects for artists including Sjava himself, Yallunder, Nue Sam, Anzo, Mzukulu and Ruff.

== History ==
1020 Cartel was formed in 2019 by Ruff and Sjava.

Labels first project iSambulo compilation studio by signee Sjava, Nue Sam, Mzukulu, Anzo, and Yallunder was released on August 28, 2020.

On December 4, 2020, extended play Umsebenzi, was released, upon its release it debuted number 1 on South African albums chart and surpassed 5 million digital streams.

== In-house producers ==
- Ruff

== Discography ==
=== Studio albums ===
| Year | Artist | Album title | Album details | Certification |
|---|---|---|---|---|
| 2020 | Sjava, Yallunder, Nue Sam, Anzo | iSambulo | Released: August 28, 2020; Label: 1020 Cartel; Formats: Streaming, digital download | |
| 2020 | Yallunder | Uthando Lwam | Released: November 13, 2020; Label: 1020 Cartel; Formats: Streaming, digital download | |
| 2020 | Sjava | Umsebenzi | Released: December 28, 2020; Label: 1020 Cartel; Formats: Streaming, digital download | Gold |
| 2021 | Anzo | 3310 | Released: August 27, 2021; Label: 1020 Cartel; Formats: Streaming, digital download | |
| 2021 | Mzukulu | Ivila Laselawini | Released: December 10, 2021; Label: 1020 Cartel; Formats: Streaming, digital download | |
| 2022 | Nue_Sam | Sipho | Released: February 25, 2022; Label: 1020 Cartel; Formats: Streaming, digital download | |
| 2022 | Mzukulu | Phendula | Released: April 15, 2022; Label: 1020 Cartel; Formats: Streaming, digital download | |
| 2023 | Sjava | Isibuko | Released: January 27, 2023; Label: 1020 Cartel; Formats: Streaming, digital download | Platinum |
| 2025 | Sjava | Inkanyezi (Live) | Released: January 31, 2025; Label: 1020 Cartel; Formats: Streaming, digital download | |
| 2026 | Ruff, Sjava, Emtee, Saudi | The Trap Temptations | Released: 16 June 2026; Label: 1020 Cartel, OVOLOE Monopoly, Emtee Records; Formats: Streaming, digital download | |

== Accolades ==
| Year | Nominee / work | Award | Result | Ref. |
|---|---|---|---|---|
| 2026 | | Best Independent Record Label | Pending | |
| 2026 | | Best Independent Music Publisher | Pending | |
| 2026 | | Best Artist Management Company | Pending | |
