= 15th SATMA =

South African Traditional Music Awards
- Date: November 27, 2021
- Venue: Mbombela Stadium, Mpumalanga
- Country: South Africa
- Hosted by: Tsholofelo Maseko Mduduzi Ntuli
- Motto: My Culture, Your Culture, One Nation

Highlights
- Most wins: Qwabe Twins (3)
- Most nominations: Qwabe Twins (4)
- Website: www.satmaawards.co.za
- Related: South African Music Awards

The 15th Annually South African Traditional Music Awards took place on November 27, 2021. The awards celebrated achievements in music and entertainment.

The nominees were announced on September 25, 2021.

== Performers ==
Artist(s)	Song(s)
Amaroto	"Umsebenzi Wethu"
Kelly Khumalo	"Empini"
Ntencane	"Wawuthembeni"

== Winners and nominees ==
Below list are nominees and winners. Winners are listed first in boldface.

Best Male Artist/Group	Best Female Artist/Group
**100%Ncobela - I Esile**; Sjava – Umsebenzi; Khavisa – Ntombi Ya Ku Xonga	**Qwabe Twins – The Gift Of Love**; Candy Tsamandebele – Still Here; Mmadintsi – Moruleng
Best Afro Soul Song	Best African Jazz Artist/Group
**Mc Records Kzn – Baby Musa Kuyenza Lento**; Motlanalo – Rato Laka; Vhudie – My Yoki Yoki	**Austebza – Motheo**; Zazi – Imal’ayikho Featuring Iye Echa On Sax
Best Reggae Artist/Group	Best Traditional Praise Singer
**Chomza – One And Only**; Jeremiah Fyah Ises – Impilo Kantanga; Ras Canly – The Journey	**Ntombhi Ya Mutsonga – Dr Mike**; Nkuna Poem; Malume Tau – Malume Tau; Khuluma Ndabezitha Imbongo – Zika Namtsweni Tsipane
Best Indigenous Poet	Best Upcoming Artist/Group
**Kwazi Nsele – Umthandazo Womfelokazi**; Magcwabe Imbongi – Thando Lwethu; Otsile – Aforika Yo Montle	**Menzi Mabizela – Bebuka Thina**; Mshengu Tshabalala The Producer – Tlogela Ntweo; Mmadintsi – Moruleng
Best Traditional Accapella Music Song	Best Traditional Music Community Radio Presenter
**Ka-Shima – Uchoma**; Thamsanqa Mahlangu – Madzela; Terrence Motsepe – Ubaba	**Silulami Dumza Dumezweni – Nkqubela Fm**; Zizele Yandisa – Khanya Fm; Khangelani Ngxaki Nkosana Ngxak’isefrijini – Ingwane Community Radio; Jikijwa – Ngqushwa Fm; Emmanuel Xolani Magaqa – Radio Station 97.7 Fm; Ausi Koropi -Kgatleng Fm(91.3); Thapelino – Mahikeng Fm (96.7); Piet Makwas – Radio Overberg Fm; Olwethu Majozi And Vezi Ntuli – Alex Fm
Best Department Of Art & Culture	Best Department Cultural Affairs Chief Director
**Limpopo**; Gauteng; Eastern Cape; Free State	**Bokone Bophirima**; Northern Cape; Western Cape; Kwazulu Natal
Best Traditional Producer	Best Traditional House Music Song
**Deejay Avesh – Pritisha**; M – Meri Maa; Mbuzeni Mkhize – Ishoba Lenkonkoni; Dlayani Patrick Hlongwane (Dj Patmesh) – Venda Boy – Ndavhuko	**Qwabe Twins featuring DJ Tira – Umuhle**; Candy Tsamandebele featuring Mr Brown -Lollilop; Nkr Featuring Thokozani Langa – Wengoma Yami
Best Sepedi Artist / Group	Best Tshivenda Artist / Group
**Tau Sebata – Mathotse**; Motlanalo – Motshiwele; Bana Ba Kgwale Cultural Group – Steri Makokoko	**Nnae – Shonisani**; Sikheli Junior – A Li Ngo Lala; Adziambei Band – Tshipala Mulilo Vol 16
Best Xitsonga Artist / Group	Best Ndebele Artist / Group
**Misskay Chardnah – A Byi Olovi**; N’wa-K Before; Khavisa – Ntombi Ya Ku Xonga	**Ngezekakaramba – Isotja**; Noalliyah Mabhena – Nomalanga; Ngezaka Dlaw’mbana – Ukhona Umbango
Best Isixhosa Artist / Group	Best Setswana Artist / Group
**Us’hlangu Semfene – Umhlangano**; Yallunder – Uthando Lwam; Abafana Bakuqumba –; Siyankqonkqoza	**Legora La Mmino – Kea Kgalema**; Tiludi Tsa Magaga – Merafe Ya; Batswana; Tswelelang Cultural Dancers – Motho Wa Me
Best Siswati Artist / Group	Best Indian Artist / Group
**Licathazi Lika Mamzomba – Umhlaba Ungehlule**; Pm² – Sikhanyisele; Soul Ngwane – Luhambo Lwami	**Preven Moodley – Devi Dharisanam**; Pritisha M – Meri Maa; Omesh Mohanpursad – Aaya Naya Zamana
Best Sesotho Artist / Group	Best Boeremusiek Artist / Group
**Morusu – Motho Mothong**; Motho Kotelo – Ke Khang 3; Bana Ba Motho – Bana Ba Motho No18	**Die Teelepeltjies – Boere Parie**; Hennie De Bruyn En Die Kiaarkerels – Warmvat Kitaar; Kannie Warries Dansorkes – Grootste Treffers
Best Maskandi Artist / Group(Traditional/Digital)	Best Traditional Collaboration Song
**Sgwebo Sentambo – Ikhumbi Ekweletayo**; Ucevuzile Mchunu – Uye Yedwa; Ichwane Lebhinca – Amagupta	**Qwabe Twins featuring Dj Tira & Ntencane – Laba Bantu**; Candy Tsamandebele Featuring Henny C – Yedin; Smangele Featuring Abafana Baka Mgqumeni – Ukubulawa Kwabafazi
Best Traditional Music Artist /Group Of The Year
**Nomtiti – Motlhala Wa Rona**; Roots 2000 – Nomasundu; Candy Tsamandebele – Still Here; Vendaboy Poet – Ndahuko; Ichwane Lebhanca – Amagupta; Ngezaka Dlaw’mbana – Ukhona Umbango; Hennie De Bruyn En Die Kiaarkerels – Warmvat Kitaar; Vho-Thaela – Ndi Ngani Africa
