= Qwabe Twins =

South African Afro pop band

- Also known as: Q Twins
- Born: 1997 (age 27–28)
- Origin: KwaZulu-Natal
- Genres: Afro Pop
- Years active: 2019–present
- Labels: Afrotaiment
- Members: Viggy Qwabe; Virginia Qwabe

Qwabe Twins is a South African Afro-pop duo formed in KwaZulu-Natal consisting of identical twins Virginia and Viggy Qwabe. They were contestants on season 15 of the Idols South Africa.

Q Twins signed a record deal with Afrotaiment Records, released their debut studio album The Gift of Love (2020).

Their second studio album Words of Hope (2022), debuted number 3 in South Africa.

== Career ==
=== Idols South Africa ===
In 2019, Qwabe Twins competed on season 15 of Idols South Africa. Virginia Qwabe performed "Khona" by Mafikizolo featuring Uhuru on the Top 5 and was eliminated. Soon after her sister elimination Viggy withdrew.

=== 2020-2022: The Gift of Love ===
Shortly after their exit on Idols South Africa, they signed a record deal with Afrotaiment Records and released their breakthrough hit single "Hamba" featuring DJ Tira on November 29, 2019. The song music video amassed 5 Million views on YouTube and scooped award at the 2021 Afrotaiment awards. Q Twins was nominated for Newest Find at the 2020 KZN Entertainment Awards. In September 18, their single "Show Me" featuring Jaziel Brothers was released. On September 25, 2020, their debut studio album The Gift of Love was released in South Africa. At the 15th ceremony of South African Traditional Music Awards, they were nominated for Best Traditional House Music Song and won two awards Female Artist/Group (The Gift of Love ) and Best Traditional Collaboration Song.

In October 2021, their single "Ziyakhala" featuring Kabza De Small was released.

Their second studio album Words of Hope was released on November 17, 2021. It reached number 3 on iTunes Top Albums.

=== 2023-present: Iqiniso ===
On October 27, 2023, their EP Iqiniso, was released.

== Discography ==
=== Studio albums ===
- The Gift of Love (2020)
- Words of Hope (2022)

=== Extended play's ===
- Iqiniso (2023)

== Achievements ==
=== Basadi in Music Awards ===
Year	Nominee / work	Award	Result	Ref.
2023	"Sobonana"	Duo/Collaboration of the Year	Won	

=== KZN Entertainment Awards ===
Year	Nominee / work	Award	Result	Ref.
2020		Newest Find	Nominated	

=== South African Traditional Music Awards ===
Year	Nominee / work	Award	Result	Ref.
2021	The Gift of Love	Best Female Artist/Group	Won	
2021	"Laba Abantu"	Best Traditional Collaboration Song	Won	
2021	"Umuhle"		Nominated	
