= Davido discography =

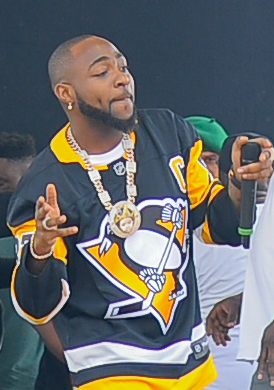
- Davido in 2020
- Studio albums: 6
- EPs: 1

The discography of Davido, a Nigerian Afrobeats singer, consists of six studio albums, one EP, and one hundred and three singles. Davido released his first album titled Omo Baba Olowo In 2011 at the age of 19, which contains 5 singles and hit song Dami Duro. The album won Album of the Year at The Headies 2013, he released the five-track EP Son of Mercy, his first and only EP till date which was supported by the singles "Gbagbe Oshi", "How Long", "Coolest Kid in Africa"; and includes guest appearances by Simi , Tinashe and Nasty C. His second studio album A Good Time was released in 2019; supported by hit singles "If", "Fall", "Assurance", "Blow My Mind" and "Risky". "Fall" was a viral hit, becoming one of the top-100-most-Shazam-searched singles in America in January 2019, and was a top-10 record on Shazam in New York. It also became the longest charting Nigerian pop song in Billboard history as of that time, and garnered 200 million views on YouTube. The album was a success, it surpassed 1 billion streams across various digital platforms in July 2020. He then followed it up with the release of his third studio album A Better Time, which was released in November 2020. It includes guest appearances from Lil Baby, Nicki Minaj, Nas, Chris Brown, and Young Thug, among others. Timeless was then released as his fourth studio album, the 17-track album includes collaborations with Skepta, Angelique Kidjo, Asake, Focalistic, The Cavemen and others. The album explores musical styles such as dancehall, ragga, konto, highlife and Afropop, it was critically acclaimed by critics both domestically and internationally. The album was nominated for Best Global Music Album at the Grammy Awards.

== Studio albums ==
List of studio albums, with selected chart positions
Title	Album details	Peak chart positions							Certification
Title	Album details	NGR	CAN	IRE	NLD	UK	US	US World	Certification
Omo Baba Olowo	Released: 17 July 2012; Label: HKN Music; Formats: Digital download, streaming	—	—	—	—	—	—	—	
A Good Time	Released: 22 November 2019; Label: DMW, RCA, Sony; Formats: Digital download, streaming	1	—	—	—	100	—	6	
A Better Time	Released: 13 November 2020; Label: DMW, RCA, Sony; Formats: Digital download, streaming	1	—	—	—	88	170	4	
Timeless	Released: 31 March 2023; Label: DMW, Columbia, Sony; Formats: Digital download, streaming	1	32	40	88	10	37	10	BPI: Silver
5ive	Released: 18 April 2025; Label: DMW, Columbia, Sony; Formats: Digital download, streaming	1	—	—	—	7	—	8	
Oriadé	Released: 31 July 2026; Label: DMW, Columbia, Sony; Formats: Digital download, streaming	—	—	—	—	98	—	8	
"—" denotes a release that did not chart or was not released in that territory.

== EP ==
Title	EP details
Son of Mercy	Released: 21 October 2016; Label: Sony; Format: Digital download, streaming

== Singles ==
=== As lead artist ===
List of singles as lead artist, with selected chart positions and certifications
Title	Year	Peak chart positions							Certification	Album
Title	Year	FRA	NLD	NZ Hot	SUR	SWI	UK	US World	Certification	Album
"Back When" (featuring Naeto C)	2011	—	—	—	—	—	—	—		Omo Baba Olowo
"Dami Duro"	2011	—	—	—	—	—	—	—		Omo Baba Olowo
"Overseas" (featuring Sina Rambo)	2012	—	—	—	—	—	—	—		Omo Baba Olowo
"Ekuro"	2012	—	—	—	—	—	—	—		Omo Baba Olowo
"All of You"	2012	—	—	—	—	—	—	—		Omo Baba Olowo
"Gbon Gbon"	2012	—	—	—	—	—	—	—		Omo Baba Olowo
"Feel Alright" (featuring Ice Prince)	2012	—	—	—	—	—	—	—		Omo Baba Olowo
"Gobe"	2013	—	—	—	—	—	—	—		Non-album singles
"One of a Kind"	2013	—	—	—	—	—	—	—		Non-album singles
"Skelewu"	2013	—	—	—	—	—	—	—		Non-album singles
"Aye"	2014	—	—	—	—	—	—	—		Non-album singles
"Tchelete (Good Life)" (with Mafikizolo)	2014	—	—	—	—	—	—	—		Non-album singles
"Naughty" (featuring DJ Arafat)	2014	—	—	—	—	—	—	—		Non-album singles
"Owo Ni Koko"	2014	—	—	—	—	—	—	—		Non-album singles
"The Sound" (featuring Uhuru and DJ Buckz)	2015	—	—	—	—	—	—	—		Non-album singles
"Fans Mi" (featuring Meek Mill)	2015	—	—	—	—	—	—	—		Non-album singles
"Dodo"	2015	—	—	—	—	—	—	—		Non-album singles
"Izzue" (with Dammy Krane)	2015	—	—	—	—	—	—	—		Non-album singles
"The Money" (featuring Olamide)	2015	—	—	—	—	—	—	—		Non-album singles
"Gbagbe Oshi"	2016	—	—	—	—	—	—	23		Son of Mercy
"How Long" (featuring Tinashe)	2016	—	—	—	—	—	—	—		Son of Mercy
"Coolest Kid in Africa" (featuring Nasty C)	2016	—	—	—	—	—	—	—		Son of Mercy
"If"	2017	—	—	—	—	—	—	10	BPI: Silver; MC: Platinum; RIAA: Gold	A Good Time
"Fall"	2017	—	—	—	—	—	—	3	BPI: Silver; MC: Platinum; RIAA: Platinum; RMNZ: Gold; SNEP: Gold	A Good Time
"Pere" (featuring Rae Sremmurd and Young Thug)	2017	—	—	—	—	—	—	5		Non-album singles
"Fia"	2017	—	—	—	—	—	—	2		Non-album singles
"Like Dat"	2017	—	—	—	—	—	—	7		Non-album singles
"Flora My Flawa"	2018	—	—	—	—	—	—	12		Non-album singles
"Assurance"	2018	—	—	—	—	—	—	—		A Good Time
"Nwa Baby"	2018	—	—	—	—	—	—	7		Non-album singles
"Wonder Woman"	2018	—	—	—	—	—	—	6		Non-album singles
"Blow My Mind" (with Chris Brown)	2019	—	—	—	—	—	—	3	MC: Gold; RIAA: Gold	A Good Time
"Risky" (featuring Popcaan)	2019	—	—	—	—	—	—	4	MC: Gold	A Good Time
"D&G" (featuring Summer Walker)	2019	—	—	—	—	—	—	16		A Good Time
"Fem"	2020	—	—	—	—	—	—	8		A Better Time
"Jowo"	2020	—	—	—	—	—	—	—		A Better Time
"So Crazy" (featuring Lil Baby)	2020	—	—	—	—	—	—	—		A Better Time
"The Best" (featuring Mayorkun)	2020	—	—	—	—	—	—	—		A Better Time
"Champion Sound" (featuring Focalistic)	2021	—	—	—	—	—	—	13		Timeless
"Stand Strong" (featuring Sunday Service Choir)	2022	—	—	—	—	—	—	—		Non-album single
"Unavailable" (featuring Musa Keys)	2023	134	57	19	4	40	52	3	BPI: Gold; IFPI SWI: 2× Platinum; MC: Platinum; RIAA: Gold; SNEP: Gold	Timeless
"Joy" (with Angelique Kidjo)	2024	—	—	—	—	—	—	—		Non-album single
"Awuke" (with YG Marley)	2024	—	—	—	—	—	—	—		5ive
"Funds" (featuring Odumodublvck & Chike)	2024	—	—	—	—	—	—	—		5ive
"Be There Still"	2025	—	—	—	—	—	—	—		5ive
"Offa Me" (featuring Victoria Monét)	2025	—	—	—	—	—	93	9		5ive
"No Place Like Home" (with Major Lazer and Nelly Furtado)	2026	—	—	—	—	—	—	10		Non-album single
"—" denotes a release that did not chart or was not released in that territory.

=== As featured artist ===
List of charted singles as featured artist
Title	Year	Peak chart positions					Certifications	Album
Title	Year	NGR	NLD Tip	NZ Hot	UK	US	Certifications	Album
"Sensational" (Chris Brown featuring Davido and Lojay)	2023	12	7	7	45	89	RMNZ: Gold	11:11
"If It's Okay" (Nicki Minaj featuring Davido and David Guetta)	2024	—	—	—	—	—		The Pinkprint: Tenth Anniversary Edition
"Pray" (Tayc featuring Davido)	2024	—	—	—	—	—		Testimony.
"Ogechi" (Hyce, Boypee & Brown Joel featuring Davido)	2024	—	—	—	—	—		Non-album single
"—" denotes a release that did not chart or was not released in that territory.

== Other charted and certified songs ==
List of other charted songs, with selected chart positions
Title	Year	Peak chart positions			Certifications	Album
Title	Year	UK	US World	US Gospel	Certifications	Album
"Gang" (Aya Nakamura featuring Davido)	2019	—	—	—	SNEP: Gold	Nakamura
"Feel"	2023	96	3	—	MC: Gold	Timeless
"Titanium" (featuring Chris Brown)	2025	—	7	—		5ive
"Hope in You" (with Kirk Franklin)	2026	—	—	6		I Am What I Am

== Covers and freestyles ==
List of covers and freestyles with release date
Title	Year	Release date
"Versace O.B.O Remix"	2013	11 July 2013
