= 5ive Alive Tour =

Concert tour by Davido

- Tour by Davido
- Promotional Poster for Davido's 5ive Alive Tour
- Location: Africa; Asia; Europe; North America
- Associated album: 5ive
- Start date: July 11, 2025
- End date: May 9, 2026
- Legs: 6
- No. of shows: 48

5ive Alive Tour (stylised as 5IVE ALIVE TOUR) was the fifth concert tour by Nigerian-American Afrobeats artist Davido, launched in support of his fifth studio album 5ive. The tour began on July 11, 2025, at the Kia Forum in Inglewood, California, and spanned North America, Africa, Europe, and the Middle East.

The tour featured a combination of headline arena, stadium and concert performances, as well as appearances at major international music festivals. It included dedicated headline runs across North America, Europe, Africa, Nigeria and Asia, alongside a separate festival run featuring appearances at Coachella, Essence Festival, Afro Nation, AfroFuture, Flytime Fest and Vodun Days.

The tour concluded in Conakry, Guinea, with its final performances taking place on May 8 and 9, 2026. Davido performed at Chapiteau by Issa on May 8 before concluding the tour with a public concert at the Esplanade du Palais du Peuple on May 9, both in Guinea.

== Background ==
The tour was announced on April 24, 2025, days after the release of 5ive on April 18, 2025. The album, released via Sony Music UK and RCA Records, debuted at number one in 21 countries on Apple Music (including the UK for 8 consecutive days and Nigeria for 7 consecutive days). It also had 27.69 million streams in its first week on Spotify Nigeria. The 17-track project features collaborators spanning multiple continents, including Chris Brown, Victoria Monét, Becky G, Omah Lay, YG Marley, Shenseea, Odumodublvck, Musa Keys, Victony, Tayc, and Dadju.

5ive Alive Tour followed the commercial success of the Timeless World Tour (2023–2024), which included a sold-out performance at London's O2 Arena, Atlanta's State Farm Arena, as well as a concert at Madison Square Garden in April 2024. The North American, African and European dates announced for 2025 covered 31 cities across 12 countries and four continents.

== Tour dates ==
5ive Alive Tour
North America
Date	City / Country	Venue	Notes
July 5, 2025	New Orleans, Louisiana, US	Caesars Superdome	Essence Festival
July 11, 2025	Inglewood, California, US	Kia Forum	
July 12, 2025	San Francisco, California, US	The Warfield	
July 16, 2025	Dallas, Texas, US	Toyota Music Factory	
July 17, 2025	Houston, Texas, US	Toyota Center	
July 19, 2025	Denver, Colorado, US	Ogden Theatre	
July 24, 2025	Minneapolis, Minnesota, US	Armory	
July 26, 2025	Toronto, Ontario, Canada	Scotiabank Arena	
July 31, 2025	Brooklyn, New York, US	Barclays Center	
August 1, 2025	Boston, Massachusetts, US	Agganis Arena	
August 2, 2025	Philadelphia, Pennsylvania, US	Liacouras Center	
August 5, 2025	Columbia, Maryland, US	Merriweather Post Pavilion	
August 15, 2025	Edmonton, Alberta, Canada	Rogers Fan Park	
August 17, 2025	Detroit, Michigan, US	Bedrock Douglass Site	AfroFuture
November 20, 2025	Atlanta, Georgia, US	State Farm Arena	Davido's Day
Europe
Date	City / Country	Venue	Notes
March 25, 2026	Vienna, Austria	Planet.tt Bank Halle	
March 27, 2026	Zürich, Switzerland	The Hall	
March 28, 2026	Rotterdam, Netherlands	RTM Stage	
March 31, 2026	Brussels, Belgium	Ancienne Belgique	
April 2, 2026	Stockholm, Sweden	B-K	
April 3, 2026	Copenhagen, Denmark	Poolen	
April 5, 2026	Barcelona, Spain	Olímpic Arena	
Africa
Date	City / Country	Venue	Notes
December 5, 2025	Kigali, Rwanda	BK Arena	
November 29, 2025	Abidjan, Ivory Coast	Parc des Expositions	
December 21, 2025	Freetown, Sierra Leone	Sugarland Beach	
February 7, 2026	Dar es Salaam, Tanzania	Lugalo Golf Course	
May 1,	Zambia	Celia Resort	
May 2, 2026	Lusaka, Zambia	Lusaka Showgrounds Polo Field	
May 8, 2026	Conakry, Guinea	Isa by Chapiteau	
May 9, 2026	Conakry, Guinea	Esplanade du Palais	
Nigeria
Date	City / Country	Venue	Notes
October 26, 2025	Uyo, Nigeria	Godswill Akpabio Stadium	
October 29, 2025	Yola, Nigeria	Mahmud Ribadu Square	
November 1, 2025	Enugu, Nigeria	Michael Okpara Square	
November 9, 2025	Ibadan, Nigeria	Liberty Stadium	
December 14, 2025	Abuja, Nigeria	Eagle Square	
Asia
Date	City / Country	Venue	Notes
November 8, 2025	Dubai, UAE	Coca-Cola Arena	
Festival appearances
Date	City / Country	Festival / Venue	Notes
June 29, 2025	Brussels, Belgium	Couleur Café	
July 5, 2025	New Orleans, Louisiana, US	Essence Festival	
July 9, 2025	Portimão, Portugal	Afro Nation	
August 17, 2025	Detroit, Michigan, US	AfroFuture	
August 29, 2025	Pretoria, South Africa	Scorpion Kings Live	
December 11, 2025	Jeddah, Saudi Arabia	Red Sea Film Festival	
December 13, 2025	Riyadh, Saudi Arabia	Soundstorm Festival	
December 20, 2025	Rabat, Morocco	OLM Souissi	
December 25, 2025	Lagos, Nigeria	Flytime Festival	
December 28, 2025	Cotonou, Benin	WeLovEya Festival	
January 8, 2026	Ouidah, Benin	Vodun Days Festival	
	Paris, France	Gala des Pièces Jaunes	
April 11, 2026	Indio, California, US	Coachella	Weekend 1
April 18, 2026	Indio, California, US	Coachella	Weekend 2

== Box office and key statistics ==
=== North American Leg ===
The 13-date North American leg, running from July through August 2025, sold out a majority of dates, with additional tickets released at multiple cities due to demand. The leg opened at the Kia Forum in Inglewood and concluded with a special birthday show on November 20, 2025, at Atlanta's State Farm Arena.

The July 5 New Orleans date was part of the Essence Festival at the Caesars Superdome. The August 17 Detroit date was part of the Afrofuture Festival at the Bedrock Douglass Site. Supporting acts for the North American leg included Nigerian rapper Odumodublvck and Afrobeats act Victony, all of whom feature on the 5ive album.

=== Nigeria Stadium Tour ===
The Nigerian leg was the first-ever nationwide stadium tour by Davido across Nigeria, spanning six cities: Uyo, Adamawa, Enugu, Ibadan, Abuja, and Lagos. Abuja's Eagle Square show was added after the initial announcement following strong fan demand. The grand homecoming finale was held in Lagos on Christmas Day, December 25, 2025, as part of the Flytime Fest. The Nigerian leg was produced on the same scale as the North American tour, featuring the same stage production, lighting design, and setlist structure.

=== Middle East and International Stops ===
Between Nigerian tour dates, Davido headlined the Soundstorm Festival in Riyadh, Saudi Arabia on December 13, 2025, attended by 600,000 people across the multi-day event. He also performed at the Coca-Cola Arena in Dubai on November 8, 2025 , a day before the Ibadan Nigeria show, travelling overnight to perform at both. On December 11, Davido performed at the Red Sea Film Festival afterparty in Jeddah, Saudi Arabia. In August 2025, Davido made a headline appearance at Scorpion Kings Live at Loftus Versfeld Stadium in Pretoria, South Africa.

=== European Leg 2026 ===
The European leg of the 5ive Alive Tour ran from March 25 to April 5, 2026, across seven cities: Vienna, Zürich, Rotterdam, Brussels, Stockholm, Copenhagen, and Barcelona. The tour closed the European run in Barcelona on April 5, 2026, at the Olympic Arena Badalona as part of the Afrobrunch event.
