= Oriadé =

Studio album by Davido
- Released: 31 July 2026
- Genres: Afrobeats; R&B; amapiano
- Length: 36:57
- Labels: DMW; SME
- Producers: Louddaaa; Pheelz; Fresh VDM; Mikaba; Classic; Sensei; Ramoni; OG Sterling; J.Sol; Jjay; Jazzwrld; Jonn P; Willis; Tallixo; Pontus Persson

Davido chronology
5ive (2025)	Oriadé (2026)

Singles from 5ive
- 1. "I Know Who I Be" Released: 26 June 2026; 2. "Gimme Dat Ting" Released: 17 July 2026

Oriadé (Yoruba: The Crowned Destiny) is the sixth studio album by Nigerian singer Davido. It was released on 31 July 2026, via Davido Music Worldwide and Sony Music Entertainment. The album features guest appearances from Leon Thomas, Black Sherif, Aya Nakamura, Mayorkun, Fola, Llona, No11, Jazzwrld, and GL_Ceejay. Supported by the singles "I Know Who I Be" and "Gimme Dat Ting", Oriadé serves as a follow-up to 5ive (2025).

== Critical reception ==
Temiloluwa Adeyemo of Clash magazine rated Oriadé 7 out of 10, describing it as "an album from a seasoned artist who knows exactly what people have always loved about his music". Writing for Premium Times newspaper, Stephen Onu also granted the album 7 out of 10, charaterizing it as Davido's "most concise project yet". Moreover, Onu said Oriadé is "an album about purpose and an affirmation of Davido's enduring ability to deliver accessible, emotionally resonant pop music at the highest level".

In a review for The Native, Emmanuel Esomnofu gave the album a rating of 6.8 out of 10, commending its "relaxed atmosphere" and "laid back energy". Esomnofu also said listeners will "probe" the album's content and "find a man triumphant and satisfied". Yinoluwa Olowofoyeku of Afrocritik rated it a 7.8 out of 10, praising its "genre diversity" although it felt "more like a playlist" than a cohesive album; Olowofoyeku concluded by calling it a "highly energetic and enjoyable listen". Priya Okafor of Shatter the Standards awarded the album 3.5 stars out of 5, highlighting the tracks "Julie", "Gimme Dat Ting", and "Guide".

== Track listing ==
Oriadé track listing
No.	Title	Writer(s)	Producer(s)	Length
1.	"On The Road"	David Adeleke; Kehinde Alabi	Louddaaa	2:16
2.	"Amazing Grace" (featuring Black Sherif)	Adeleke; Mohammed Sherif; Jason Lopez; Mark Jones; Ufomadu Chris	J.Sol	2:31
3.	"Julie"	Adeleke; Oladokun Elijah; John Pininen	Jonn P	2:30
4.	"Constantly"	Adeleke; Philip Moses	Pheelz	2:41
5.	"I Know Who I Be" (with Jazzwrld and GL_Ceejay)	Adeleke; Kamohelo Monese; Gobokweone Lekganyane; Olaa; Tobechukwu Okorie	Jazzwrld	3:53
6.	"Gimme Dat Ting" (with No11)	Adeleke; Nnamdi Odom; Jjay; Toye	Jjay	4:03
7.	"B4 B4" (with Mayorkun and Fola)	Adeleke; Mayowa Adewale; Afolarin Odunlami	Fresh VDM	2:46
8.	"Already Falling"	Adeleke; Okorie; Classic; Godson Godwin; Hugo Peretti	Classic; Sensei	3:26
9.	"Tell Everybody" (featuring Leon Thomas)	Adeleke; Leon Thomas; Donel; Pontus Persson	Pontus Persson	2:30
10.	"Yaya" (featuring Aya Nakamura)	Adeleke; Aya Danioko; Rozz; Willis; Tallixo; Major AJ; Armageddon; Pete	Willis; Tallixo	2:28
11.	"Zanzibar"	Adeleke; Moonlight Afriqa; Mikaba	Mikaba	2:09
12.	"Guide"	Adeleke; Okorie; Classic; Godwin	Classic; Sensei	2:48
13.	"My Light" (with Llona)	Adeleke; Michael Ajuma; OG Sterling; Ramoni; Toye	OG Sterling; Ramoni	2:52
Total length:				36:57

== Personnel ==
Credits are adapted from Tidal.

- Davido – vocals
- Leonadro "Dro" Hidalgo – mixing
- Aidan Duncan – mixing assistance
- Javier Ruben de Vries – mixing assistance
- Colin Leonard – mastering
- Kayode "Tycoone" Umardeen – design
- Black Sherif – vocals (2)
- Pheelz – background vocals (4)
- Jazzwrld – vocals (5)
- GL_Ceejay – vocals (5)
- No11 – vocals (6)
- Peruzzi – background vocals (8, 11)
- Donel – background vocals (9)
- Leon Thomas – vocals (9)
- Aya Nakamura – vocals (10)
- Moonlight Afriqa – background vocals (11)
- Mikaba – background vocals (11)
- Anyalechi Daniel – bass guitar (11)
- OG Sterling – vocals (13)

== Charts ==
Chart performance for Oriadé
Chart (2026)	Peak position
Nigerian Albums (TurnTable)	1
UK Albums (Official Charts)	98
US World Albums (Billboard)	8
