= Omo Baba Olowo =

Studio album by Davido
- Released: July 17, 2012
- Genres: Afrobeats; hip-hop
- Length: 65:00
- Label: HKN Music
- Producers: Shizzi; Jay Sleek; Maleek Berry; GospelOnDeBeatz; Spellz; Dokta Frabz; Theory Soundz; Mr. Chidoo

Davido chronology
Omo Baba Olowo (2012)	Son of Mercy (2016)

Singles from Omo Baba Olowo
- 1. "Back When" Released: May 7, 2011; 2. "Dami Duro" Released: October 30, 2011; 3. "Overseas" Released: May 6, 2012; 4. "Ekuro" Released: May 25, 2012; 5. "All of You" Released: September 28, 2012; 6. "Gbon Gbon" Released: October 17, 2012; 7. "Feel Alright" Released: December 8, 2012

Omo Baba Olowo (Yoruba: Son of a Rich Man) is the debut studio album by Nigerian singer Davido. It was released by HKN Music on July 17, 2012, and is a mixture of Afrobeats and hip hop. The album was produced by Jay Sleek, Maleek Berry, GospelOnDeBeatz, Spellz, Dokta Frabz, Mr. Chidoo, Theory Soundz, and Shizzi. Omo Baba Olowo features collaborations with Naeto C, Sina Rambo, B-Red, Kayswitch, Ice Prince, May D, and 2face Idibia. It was supported by the singles "Back When", "Dami Duro", "Overseas", "Ekuro", "All of You", "Gbon Gbon", and "Feel Alright".

Omo Baba Olowo received generally negative reviews from music critics, who panned its lyrics and Davido's songwriting. The album won Best R&B/Pop Album and received a nomination for Album of the Year at The Headies 2013. It was also nominated for Best Album of the Year at the 2013 Nigeria Entertainment Awards.

== Background and promotion ==
On July 22, 2012, the album's launch concert was held at the Expo Hall of the Eko Hotel and Suites in Victoria Island, Lagos. Davido's father Adedeji Adeleke and Aliko Dangote attended the event. Other celebrities who attended include D'banj, Naeto C, Toke Makinwa, Daddy Freeze, and Funke Akindele, among others. The album's lead single, "Back When", was released on May 7, 2011. It features a rap verse from Naeto C and was recorded on Old Kent Road in London. The music video for "Back When" was filmed in Nigeria by Clarence Peters and uploaded to YouTube on May 9, 2011. The album's second single, "Dami Duro", was released on October 30, 2011. Davido told Adeola Adeyemo of BellaNaija he was skeptical when he dropped the song. The music video for "Dami Duro" was directed in Lagos by Peters.

"Overseas" was released as the album's third single on May 6, 2012. It features a rap verse by Sina Rambo and was produced by Shizzi. An unfinished version of the song, titled "Take You Round The World", was released a week prior to the official release. The music video for "Overseas" was also directed by Smith. The album's fourth single, "Ekuro", was officially released on May 25, 2012, along with its music video. Director Antwan Smith filmed the music video in Miami. An alternative version of the "Ekuro" leaked on January 25, 2012. Davido's management said the song was intended to be a Valentine's Day gift for fans and not a planned single, adding that the third single would be released weeks later. In 2013, Nigerian singer Aramide released a soulful rendition of the track.

The GospelOnDeBeatz-produced track "All of You" was released on September 28, 2012, as the album's fifth single; it was rumored to be a beef track. The accompanying music video for "All of You" was recorded in Brooklyn, New York by Sesan Ogunro. On October 17, 2012, Davido released the Shizzi-produced track "Gbon Gbon" as the album's sixth single. Its music video was directed in Lagos by Peters. "Feel Alright" was released on December 8, 2012, as the album's seventh single. It was produced by Dokta Frabz and features vocals by Ice Prince. Aje Filmworks recorded the music video in Lagos.

== Composition ==
The album opens with "All of You", a song with a mid tempo beat. In "Dollars in the Bank", Davido addresses gold diggers who are out for his wealth. In "Video", he lures a female fan into shooting an adult film with him. "Mary Jane" has two meanings. On the surface, the song seems to be about a "bad girl" who makes Davido's head explode, but underneath, it is an ode to marijuana. In the drum-infused track "Gbon Gbon", producer Shizzi reproduces the sound of "Dami Duro". "No Visa" is a fusion of Europop and Azonto. "All of You" reveals a conceited Davido who sees himself as a victim of unjust castigation. "Feel Alright" is a song about the wax and wane of a relationship. The Maleek Berry-produced track "New Skul Tinz" has an imperceptible dancehall feel to it. In "Enter the Center", Davido is reminiscent of Terry G.

== Critical reception ==
Professional ratings
Review scores
Source	Rating
Nigerian Entertainment Today	3.5/5 stars
Hip Hop World Magazine	1/5 stars

Omo Baba Olowo received generally negative reviews from music critics. Writing for Africa Magic, Toni Kan praised the album's production, but ended the review saying it "sounds very familiar in places, leaving you with a heavy feeling of deja vu." In a review for Nigerian Entertainment Today, Ayomide Tayo awarded the album 3.5 stars out of 5, saying Davido's "songwriting skills could be better and his voice could be better groomed". Moreover, Tayo criticized the producers for "failing to cover up Davido's failings as an artiste".

Tobi Amoo of Hip Hop World Magazine gave the album 1 star out of 5, stating: "David's debut album fails to strike that balance; not only does it not have enough hits to leave any impression as to his talents as a recording artiste, it possesses too many songs of the same mediocre quality, leading you to wonder if there will be a follow-up attempt or if indeed there need be." YNaija's Ore Fakorede criticized Davido's songwriting and singing voice. Wilfred Okiche said a "trip back to the drawing board should save his career the horror of another record like this."

=== Accolades ===
Omo Baba Olowo won Best R&B/Pop Album and received a nomination for Album of the Year at The Headies 2013. It was also nominated for Best Album of the Year at the 2013 Nigeria Entertainment Awards.

== Track listing ==
No.	Title	Writer(s)	Producer(s)	Length
1.	"All of You"	David Adeleke	GospelOnDeBeatz	3:07
2.	"Back When" (featuring Naeto C)	Adeleke; Naetochukwu Chikwe	Davido	3:40
3.	"New Skul Tinz" (featuring Sina Rambo and B-Red)	Adeleke; Shina Adeleke; Bayo Adeleke	Shizzi; Mr. Chidoo; B-Red	4:10
4.	"Video"	Adeleke	Maleek Berry	3:53
5.	"Ekuro"	Adeleke	Shizzi	3:27
6.	"Down"	Adeleke	Spellz	3:51
7.	"No Visa" (featuring Sina Rambo)	Adeleke; Shina Adeleke	Theory Soundz	4:13
8.	"Enter the Center" (featuring B-Red)	Adeleke; Bayo Adeleke	Maleek Berry	3:22
9.	"Dollars In the Bank" (featuring Kayswitch)	Adeleke	Shizzi	3:42
10.	"Sade"	Adeleke	Jay Sleek	4:00
11.	"Gbon Gbon"	Adeleke	Shizzi	3:26
12.	"Feel Alright" (featuring Ice Prince)	Adeleke; Panshak Zamani	Dokta Frabz	4:10
13.	"Mary Jane"	Adeleke	Jay Sleek	3:22
14.	"For You" (featuring 2Face Idibia)	Adeleke; Innocent Ujah Idibia	Maleek Berry	3:39
15.	"Overseas" (featuring Sina Rambo)	Adeleke; Shina Adeleke	Shizzi	4:30
16.	"Dami Duro"	Adeleke	Shizzi; Davido	4:12
17.	"Bless Me" (featuring May D)	Adeleke; Akinmayokun Awodumila	Shizzi	4:14
Total length:				65:00

== Personnel ==
Credits adapted from the album's back cover.

- David "Davido" Adeleke – primary artist, writer, executive producer, mastering
- Adewale Adeleke – executive producer
- Dr. Adedeji Adeleke – executive producer
- Asa Askia – co-executive producer
- Sharon Adeleke – co-executive producer
- Kamal Ajiboye – co-executive producer
- Shizzi – producer, mastering
- Jerry "Jay Sleek" Shelika – producer
- Maleek Berry – producer
- Gospel "OnDeBeatz" Obi – producer
- Mr. Chidoo – producer
- Spellz – producer
- Dokta Frabz – producer
- Theory Soundz – producer, mixing, mastering
- Naetochukwu Chikwe – featured artist, writer
- Kehinde Oladotun Oyebanjo – featured artist
- Shina "Rambo" Adeleke – featured artist, writer
- Bayo "B-Red" Adeleke – featured artist, producer, writer
- Panshak Zamani – featured artist, writer
- Akinmayokun "May D" Awodumila – featured artist, writer
- Innocent Ujah Idibia – featured artist, writer
- TCD Photography – cover art photography

== Release history ==
Region	Date	Version	Format	Label	Ref
Various	July 17, 2012	Standard	CD; digital download	HKN Music; DMW; Virgin Music Nigeria	
