= List of awards and nominations received by Davido =

Davido awards and nominations
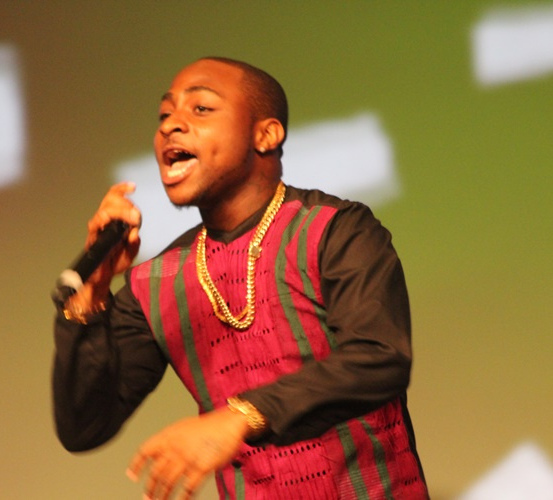
- Davido performing at the 2014 Africa Magic Viewers Choice Awards
Awards and nominations
Award	Wins	Nominations
Ghana Music Awards	1	1
Nigeria Entertainment Awards	5	7
Channel O Music Video Awards	3	6
City People Entertainment Award	2	5
Nigeria Music Video Awards (NMVA)	3	8
4Syte TV Music Video Awards	2	8
Kora Awards	1	1
World Music Awards	0	7
MTV Africa Music Awards	2	4
BET Awards	2	8
African Muzik Magazine Awards	2	6
MOBO Awards	1	5
The Future Africa Awards	1	1
MTV Europe Music Awards	2	4
Grammy Awards	0	3

This is a list of major music awards and nominations received by Nigerian singer Davido.

== African Entertainment Awards USA ==
Year	Nominee / work	Award	Result	Ref
2024	Himself	Best Male Artist	Nominated	
2024	Himself	Artist of the Year	Won	
2024	"Drift"	Best Collaboration	Nominated	
2024	"Hmmm"	Best Collaboration	Nominated	
2024	"Na Money"	Best Music Video	Nominated	
2024	"Ogechi Remix"	Song of the Year	Nominated	

== Berlin Music Video Awards ==
Year	Nominee / work	Award	Result	Ref
2024	"Na Money"	Best Art Director	Nominated	

== Grammy Awards ==
Year	Nominee / work	Award	Result	Ref
2024	Timeless	Best Global Music Album	Nominated	
2024	"Feel"	Best Global Music Performance	Nominated	
2024	"Unavailable" (featuring Musa Keys)	Best African Music Performance	Nominated	
2025	"Sensational" (with Chris Brown & Lojay)	Best African Music Performance	Nominated	
2026	"With You" (featuring Omah Lay)	Best African Music Performance	Nominated	

== Soul Train Awards ==
Year	Nominee / work	Award	Result	Ref
2014	Davido for "Aye"	Best International Performance	Nominated	

== The Future Africa Awards ==
Year	Nominee / work	Award	Result	Ref
2014	Himself	African Young Person of the Year	Nominated	

== Kora Awards ==
Year	Nominee / work	Award	Result	Ref
2012	Himself	Best Newcomer Award	Won	

== BET Awards ==
Year	Nominee / work	Award	Result	Ref
2014	Himself	Best International Act: Africa	Won	

== Ben TV Awards ==
Year	Nominee / work	Award	Result	Ref
2014	Himself	Best Male Artist	Nominated	
2014	"Daddy" (Reminisce featuring Davido)	Best Collaboration	Nominated	
2014	"Number One" Remix (Diamond Platnumz featuring Davido)	Best International Collaboration	Nominated	
2014	"Aye"	Music Video of the Year	Won	

== Dynamix All Youth Awards ==
Year	Nominee / work	Award	Result	Ref
2011	Himself	Promising Youth Artiste	Won	
2011	"Back When"	Song of the Year	Won	

== MOBO Awards ==
Year	Nominee / work	Award	Result	Ref
2014	Himself	Best African Act	Nominated	

== MTV Europe Music Awards ==
Year	Nominee / work	Award	Result	Ref
2014	Himself	Best African Act	Nominated	

== African Muzik Magazine Awards ==
Year	Nominee / work	Award	Result	Ref
2014	Himself	Best Male West Africa	Won	
2014	Himself	Artist of the Year	Won	
2014	"Skelewu"	Song of the Year	Nominated	
2014	"Skelewu"	Best Dance in a Video	Nominated	
2014	"Number One Remix"	Song of the Year	Nominated	
2014	"Number One Remix"	Best Collabo	Nominated	

== MTV Africa Music Awards ==
Year	Nominee / work	Award	Result	Ref
2014	Himself	Best Male	Won	
2014	Himself	Artist of the Year	Won	
2014	"Number One" (Remix) (Diamond featuring Davido)	Best Collaboration	Nominated	
2014	"Skelewu"	Song of the Year	Nominated	

== World Music Awards ==
Year	Nominee / work	Award	Result	Ref
2014	Himself	World's Best Male Artist	Nominated	
2014	Himself	World's Best Live Act	Nominated	
2014	Himself	World's Best Entertainer Of The Year	Nominated	

== Channel O Music Video Awards ==
Year	Nominee / work	Award	Result	Ref
2014	"Aye"	Most Gifted Male	Nominated	
2014	"Aye"	Most Gifted Afropop	Nominated	
2014	"Aye"	Most Gifted West	Nominated	
2014	"Aye"	Most Gifted Video	Nominated	
2014	"Skelewu"	Most Gifted Dance	Nominated	
2013	"Gobe"	Most Gifted Afro Pop Video	Nominated	
2012	"Dami Duro"	Most Gifted Dance Video of the Year	Nominated	
2012	"Dami Duro"	Most Gifted Newcomer Video of the Year	Won	

== Nigeria Music Video Awards (NMVA) ==
Year	Nominee / work	Award	Result	Ref
2014	"Aye"	Video of the Year	Nominated	
2014	"Aye"	Indigenous Concept	Nominated	
2014	"Aye"	Best Use Of Costumes	Nominated	
2014	"Aye"	Best Afro Pop Video	Won	
2014	"Tchelete (Goodlife)" (featuring Mafikizolo)	Best Pop Extra Video	Nominated	
2013	"All of You"	Best Dance Hall/Reggae Video	Nominated	
2013	"Gobe"	Best Pop Extra Video	Nominated	
2012	"Dami Duro"	Best Video By A New Artiste (Live Beats Choice)	Won	

== 4Syte TV Music Video Awards ==
Year	Nominee / work	Award	Result	Ref
2014	"Aye"	Best African Video	Nominated	
2013	"Gobe"	Best African Act Video	Nominated	
2012	"Dami Duro osezy"	Best African Act Video	Nominated	

== Ghana Music Awards ==
Year	Nominee / work	Award	Result	Ref
2024	Himself	African Artiste Of The Year	Won	
2014	Himself	African Artiste Of The Year	Won	
2013	Himself	African Artiste Of The Year	Nominated	

== City People Entertainment Awards ==
Year	Nominee / work	Award	Result	Ref
2014	Himself	Musician Of The Year (Male)	Won	
2014	"Aye"	Most Popular Song of the Year	Nominated	
2014	"Aye"	Video of the Year	Nominated	
2014	"Daddy" (Reminisce featuring Davido)	Best Collabo of the Year	Nominated	
2013	Himself	Musician of the Year (Male)	Nominated	
2013	Himself	Best Hip-Hop Artiste of the Year	Nominated	
2013	"Gobe"	Most Popular Song of the Year	Nominated	

== The Headies ==
Year	Nominee / work	Award	Result	Ref
2018	Himself	Artiste of the Year	Won	
2018	"If"	Song of the Year	Won	
2018	"If"	Best Pop Single	Won	
2018	"If"	Headies Viewer's Choice	Nominated	
2018	"Like Dat"	Best Music Video	Nominated	
2014	Himself	Artiste of the Year	Won	
2014	"Aye"	Song of the Year	Won	
2014	"Aye"	Best Pop Single	Nominated	
2013	Himself	Artiste of the Year	Nominated	
2013	Himself	Hip Hop World Revelation	Won	
2013	"Omo Baba Olowo"	Best R&B/Pop Album	Won	
2013	"Omo Baba Olowo"	Album of the Year	Nominated	
2013	"Gobe"	Best Pop Single	Nominated	
2012	Himself	Next Rated	Won	
2012	"Dami Duro"	Best Pop Single	Nominated	
2012	"Dami Duro"	Song of the Year	Nominated	
2012	"Carolina" (Sauce Kid featuring Davido)	Best Collabo	Nominated	
2022	Himself	Best Male Artist	Nominated	
2022	Himself	African Artist of the Year	Nominated	
2022	Himself	Humanitarian Award of the Year	Won	
2022	A Better Time	Best Afrobeats Album	Nominated	
2025	Himself	Artist of the year	Won	
2027	Himself	Best Male Artiste	Pending	
2027	"Fun"	Afrobeats Single of the Year	Pending	
2027	"Baby (Is it a Crime)"	Best Recording of the Year	Pending	
2027	"Baby (Is it a Crime)"	Viewers' Choice Award	Pending	

== Nigeria Entertainment Awards ==
Year	Nominee / work	Award	Result	Ref
2014	"Aye"	Hottest Single of the Year	Won	
2014	Himself	Male Artist of the Year	Won	
2014	"Skelewu"	Best Music Video of the Year (Artist & Director)	Nominated	
2014	"Gallardo" (RunTown featuring Davido)	Best Collaboration	Won	
2014	"Mofe Lowo Ju Daddy Mi" (Reminisce featuring Davido)	Best Collaboration	Nominated	
2013	O.B.O (Omo Baba Olowo)	Best Album of the Year	Nominated	
2013	Himself	Best Pop/R&B Artiste of the Year	Won	
2012	"Dami Duro"	Hottest Single of the Year	Won	
2012	Himself	Best New Act of the Year	Won	
2012	"Carolina" (Sauce Kid featuring Davido)	Best Collabo of the Year	Won	

== Nickelodeon Kids' Choice Awards ==
Year	Nominee / work	Award	Result	Ref
2018	Davido	Favorite African Star	Nominated	

== AFRIMA ==
Year	Award ceremony	Prize	Work/recipient	Result	Ref
2019	AFRIMA	Artist of the Year	Himself	Pending	
2019	AFRIMA	Best Male West Africa	Himself	Pending	
2019	AFRIMA	Crossing Boundaries with Music Award	Himself	Pending	

== Net Honours ==
Year	Nominee/work	Award	Result	Ref
2021	Himself	Most Searched Musician (male)	Won	
2021	"Fem"	Most Played Pop Song	Nominated	
2021	"The Best" featuring Mayorkun	Most Played Pop Song	Nominated	
2022	Himself	Most Popular Musician (Male)	Won	
2022	Himself	Most Searched Musician (Male)	Won	
2022	Himself	Most Popular Fandom	Won	
