= If (Davido song) =

Single by Davido

from the album A Good Time
- Released: 17 February 2017
- Genre: Afrobeats; R&B
- Length: 3:57
- Label: DMW; RCA; Sony
- Songwriters: Augustine Okechukwu; David Adeleke
- Producer: Tekno

Davido singles chronology
"Giddem" (2017)	"If" (2017)	"Money" (2017)

Music video
- "If" on YouTube

"If" is a song by Nigerian singer Davido. It was released on 17 February 2017, as the lead single from his second studio album A Good Time (2018). Produced and ghostwritten by Tekno, the song is a mixture of Afrobeats and R&B. "If" became one of Davido's most commercially successful singles, reaching number one on Nigerian radio charts and charting internationally. A remix, featuring American singer R. Kelly, was released in June 2017.

== Background ==
After releasing the Son of Mercy EP in 2016, Davido said he was unhappy with the project and felt it did not reflect his usual style. In an interview with The Native, he said the songs "were not picked by [him]" and that he "wasn't in the right place," pointing to label influence at the time. He later returned to Nigeria and began what he called a "Back to Basics" approach, working closely with local producers. During this period, he recorded "If" with Tekno, which signaled a return to his usual style.

== Music video ==
The accompanying music video for "If" was released on 17 February 2017, coinciding with the single's release. It was directed by Director Q and produced by Tunde Babalola, and stars Nqobilé Danseur playing the role of Davido's love interest. He uploaded behind-the-scenes photos of the music video to Snapchat in January 2017.

== Commercial performance ==
"If" debuted at number four on the Playdata Radio Top Ten chart dated 6 March 2017. It rose to number one the following week, displacing "Mad Over You" as the most played song on Nigerian radio. "If" remained at number one for several consecutive weeks. It had been on the chart for seven weeks by 18 April 2017, with six of those weeks spent at the top, despite opposition from songs like "All Over" by Tiwa Savage and "Juice" by Ycee. "If" continued its run through late April and early May. After ten weeks at the top of the Playdata Radio Top Ten chart, "If" was overtaken by Ycee's "Juice" on May 8, 2017, ending its lengthy reign as the most played song on Nigerian radio.

== Remix ==
On 13 May 2017, American singer R. Kelly announced a remix of "If" and shared a video of himself playing it in his car. The remix was officially released for free download on 28 June 2017. Rap-Up said that the remix "blends Afrobeat, R&B, and a little bit of crunk," and sees "Davido hold[ing] it down over a brief Lil Jon vocal sample" alongside R. Kelly bringing "some raunchiness to the dance-ready track."

== Critical reception ==
In a review for OkayAfrica, Sabo Kpade wrote that "If" showed Davido in a different light as it was "not what we've come to expect,." He describied it as "sexy, it slinks and sashays" and "a slow burner," concluding that although the lyrics were "memorable, no doubt," only "an unfair critic would tell you he hasn't imbibed these songs to completion," while noting its Tekno-like simplicity and humor. A writer for The Native called the song a "super laid-back acoustic rework" that was "stripped bare of many distractions" to highlight Davido's vocals. They praised how he "sleekly" incorporates a sample of Lagbaja's "Gra Gra", and concluded that he "resurrected a 'Lagbaja hit', then casually decided to make it a 'Davido hit'", affirming him as "a top-class act."

Oris Aigbokhaevbolo, reviewing for Music in Africa, said that “If” marked Davido's return to form as "a deliciously produced minimalist courtship song," noting its "danceably Tekno-esque" drums and local references, and concluding that although its elements might seem "disparate, and maybe even a little desperate" on paper, "on radio, though, it is hit music," made for the Nigerian ear. The Fader ranked it #53 on their list of the 101 Best Songs of 2017, with author Lakin Starling calling it "the perfect wedding soundtrack" and commending Davido for "cruis[ing] over the Tekno production," adding that "it's hard not to bend your back, glide your feet, and celebrate real love" to the track.

=== Accolades ===
Awards and nominations for "If"
Organization	Year	Category	Result	Ref.
The Headies	2018	Best Pop Single	Won	
The Headies	2018	Song of the Year	Won	
The Headies	2018	Viewer's Choice	Nominated	
Nigeria Entertainment Awards	2017	Hottest Single of the Year	Won	
Nigeria Entertainment Awards	2017	Best Music Video	Nominated	
African Muzik Magazine Awards	2017	Song of the Year	Won	
African Muzik Magazine Awards	2017	Video of the Year	Nominated	
Soundcity MVP Awards Festival	2017	Song of the Year	Won	
Soundcity MVP Awards Festival	2017	Video of the Year	Won	
Soundcity MVP Awards Festival	2017	Viewer's Choice	Nominated	
Soundcity MVP Awards Festival	2017	Listener's Choice	Nominated	
tooXclusive Awards	2017	Certified Banger of the Year	—	

== Charts ==
Chart (2017)	Peak position
Nigeria Airplay (Playdata charts)	1
US World Digital Song Sales (Billboard)	10

== Certifications ==
Certifications for "If"
Region	Certification	Certified units/sales
Canada (Music Canada)	Platinum	80,000^{‡}
United Kingdom (BPI)	Silver	200,000^{‡}
United States (RIAA)	Gold	500,000^{‡}
^{‡} Sales+streaming figures based on certification alone.
