= Titanium (Davido song) =

2025 single by Davido featuring Omah Lay

Song by Davido featuring Chris Brown

from the album 5ive
- Language: English; Pidgin
- Released: April 18, 2025
- Length: 2:33
- Label: DMW; Columbia; SME
- Producers: Jon P; Nick Pin gree

Audio video
- "Titanium" on YouTube

"Titanium" is a song by Nigerian-American singer and songwriter Davido, featuring American singer and songwriter Chris Brown. Released on April 18, 2025, as the Twelfth single from Davido's album 5ive.

== Personnel ==
Credits adapted from Apple Music.

- Davido - Vocal, writer
- Chris Brown - vocal
- 2Epik - writer
- Dewain Whitmore, Jr - writer
- Julian Bell - writer
- Jon P - Producer
- Nick Pingree - producer
- D-Ro - Mixing engineer, mastering engineer
- Aidan Duncan - Assistant mixing engineer

== Charts ==
Chart performance for "Titanium"
Chart (2025)	Peak position
New Zealand Hot Singles (RMNZ)	16
Nigeria (TurnTable Top 100)	30
US Afrobeats Songs (Billboard)	6
US World Digital Song Sales (Billboard)	7
