= 5ive (Davido album) =

Studio album by Davido
- Released: 18 April 2025
- Recorded: 2023–2025
- Genre: Afropop
- Length: 49:09
- Labels: DMW; Columbia; SME
- Producers: Mikababeatz; Marvey Muzique; Ucee; DJ Maphorisa; Black Culture; Louddaaa; Dayo Grey; Shizzi; Michaël Brun; Spencer; Blaisebeatz; Jon P; Nkulee; Selebobo; Nick Pingriee; Yung Alpha; 1da Banton; Tempoe

Davido chronology
Timeless (2023)	5ive (2025)	Oriadé (2026)

Singles from 5ive
- 1. "Awuke" Released: 31 October 2024; 2. "Funds" Released: 6 December 2024; 3. "Be There Still" Released: 14 March 2025; 4. "Offa Me" Released: 17 April 2025

5ive is the fifth studio album by Nigerian singer Davido, released on 18 April 2025, through Davido Music Worldwide, Columbia Records, and Sony Music Entertainment. The album features many guest appearances from Alhanislam, Chris Brown, Victoria Monét, Becky G, Omah Lay, Shenseea, Musa Keys, 450, Tayc, Dadju, YG Marley, Odumodublvck, and Chike. Its production was handled by Marvey Musique, 1da Banton, DJ Maphorisa, Tempoe, Blaisebeatz, Selebobo, and Michaël Brun among others. The album was supported by the single "Awuke", "Funds", and "Be There Still".

== Background ==
Davido announced the album on 5 December 2024 via his official Instagram page, sharing its title and release window. According to Davido, 5ive represents "a new chapter of personal growth and global connection." The album was recorded between 2023 and 2025 with sessions across Lagos, London, and Los Angeles.

== Singles ==
5ive has been supported by three official singles:

- "Awuke" featuring YG Marley — released 31 October 2024.
- "Funds" featuring Odumodublvck and Chike — released 6 December 2024.
- "Be There Still" — released 14 March 2025.

== Critical reception ==
Professional ratings
Review scores
Source	Rating
Ratings Game Music	B-
The Guardian	3/5 stars
Rolling Stone	3.5/5 stars
Premium Times	6/10
The Native	6.4/10
Afrocritik	6.8/10
Pulse Nigeria	7/10
Pitchfork	7.3/10

Adeayo Adebiyi of Pulse Nigeria said 5ive showed that Davido "doubled down on his most defining traits" by focusing on familiar hit-making formulas and star collaborations, concluding that the album reinforced his place in Afrobeats "even if it came at the cost of a rounded album," and he rated it 7/10. Dennis Ade Peter, writing for OkayAfrica, called the album "16 attempts at making buzzy slappers," and concluded that it proved veteran Afrobeats stars "don’t need new tricks to be compelling" when they understand their strengths. Walden Green of Pitchfork described the album as "an intoxicating breath of ocean air," and stated that "by now, the crown is [Davido's] for the taking," rating it 7.3/10.

The Guardian's Damien Morris awarded the album 3 out of 5 stars, writing that while 5ive had moments where Davido "sings well" over smooth, subtle production, the album felt overstretched, concluding that "a sharper, shorter collection would be better." Mankaprr Conteh of Rolling Stone wrote that on the album, Davido reflected on love, faith, and longevity as he "counts his blessings," and concluded that the album was "a testament" to human resilience, rating it 3.5/5. Quincy of Ratings Game Music gave 5ive a B−, stating that the album proved Davido "rarely has dull moments" as he delivered energetic, versatile Afropop driven by strong features, and concluded that the album was "cohesive, consistent, and summer-ready."

Afrocritik writers Abioye Damilare Samson and Yinoluwa Olowofoyeku said that Davido "understand[s] the anatomy of a pop record" as he stacked polished, energetic hits on 5ive, but concluded that listeners were "waiting with bated breath for the album that will be able to tie it all together as a definitive and cohesive body of work," rating it 6.8/10. Wale Oloworekende of The Native said that on 5ive, Davido remained an afropop force who "understands the mechanics of moments," but concluded that the album’s ideas often felt underdeveloped and finished "with a sigh of relief rather than the transcendental elation" of his best work, rating it 6.4/10. Ovwe Medeme of Premium Times said that 5ive carried moments of faith, love, and reflection as Davido explored global sounds, but concluded that it felt like an album released "because it was time for another one, not because he was ready," rating it 6/10.

=== Accolades ===
Year	Awards ceremony	Award description(s)	Results
2025	All Africa Music Awards	Album of the Year	Nominated
2026	African Muzik Magazine Awards	Album of the Year	Won
2026	Galaxy Music Awards	Album of the Year	Pending

== Track listing ==
5ive track listing
No.	Title	Writer(s)	Producer(s)	Length
1.	"Five by Alhanislam"	David Adeleke; Maryam Hassan; Bobo Ajudua	Abejide Afolabi Oluwatimilehin; Eniola Adekoya; Marvey Muzique	1:11
2.	"Anything"	Adeleke; Jacob Hunter	Louddaaa; Dayo Grey	3:02
3.	"Be There Still"	Adeleke; Ibrahim Bakare; Nwamu Francis Chukwudubem	Marvey Muzique; DJ Maphorisa; Black Culture	3:16
4.	"CFMF"	Adeleke; Diende; Anthony Victor	Shizzi	3:09
5.	"10 Kilo"	Adeleke; Hunter	Louddaaa; Dayo Grey	2:16
6.	"Offa Me" (featuring Victoria Monét)	Adeleke; Michaël Brun; Spencer Stewart; Victoria Monét; Jessy Oliver	Brun; Spencer	3:09
7.	"Don't Know"	Adeleke; Oliver	Blaisebeatz	2:46
8.	"R&B" (featuring Shenseea and 450)	Adeleke; Chinsea Lee; 450; Danny Brace	Jon P	3:12
9.	"Awuke" (featuring YG Marley)	Adeleke; Moonlight Afriqa	Mikababeatz; Marvey Muzique	2:52
10.	"Holy Water" (featuring Victony and Musa Keys)	Adeleke; Victor; Deinde; Ashidapo; Oliver; SaveMilli	Marvey Muzique; Nkulee	3:47
11.	"Nuttin Dey"	Adeleke	Selebobo	2:41
12.	"Titanium" (featuring Chris Brown)	Adeleke; 2Epik; Julien Bell; Dewain Whitmore	Jon P; Nick Pingree	2:33
13.	"Lately"	Adeleke; Oliver	Yung Alpha	3:15
14.	"Tek" (featuring Becky G)	Adeleke; Rebecca Gomez	Jon P	3:02
15.	"Funds" (featuring Odumodublvck and Chike)	Adeleke; Tochukwu Ojogwu; Chike-Ezekpeazu Osebuka; Mizzle	Ucee; Marvey Muzique^{[a]}; Aidan Duncan^{[a]}	3:26
16.	"Lover Boy" (featuring Tayc and Dadju)	Adeleke; Julien Bouadjie; Dadju Nsungula; Godson Epelle	1da Banton	3:08
17.	"With You" (featuring Omah Lay)	Adeleke; Stanley Didia; Oliver	Tempoe	2:16
Total length:				48:32

Note

- ^{^[a]} signifies an additional producer.

== Personnel ==
Credits adapted from Tidal.

- Davido – vocals, executive production
- Dro – mastering, mixing (tracks 1–9, 11–17)
- Marvey Muzique – mastering, mixing (track 10); engineering (7, 13, 15)
- Rex Ricketts – engineering (track 1)
- Yung Alpha – engineering (track 6)
- Aidan Duncan – mixing, engineering (track 9); mixing assistance (1–8, 11–17)
- The Chordinator – strings (track 1)
- Promise Aroninuola – guitar (tracks 3, 10, 15)

== Charts ==
Chart performance for 5ive
Chart (2025)	Peak position
French Albums (SNEP)	173
Nigerian Albums (TurnTable)	1
Swiss Albums (Schweizer Hitparade)	83
UK Albums (Official Charts)	7
UK R&B Albums (Official Charts)	2
US World Albums (Billboard)	2

== Release history ==
Release history and formats for 5ive
Region	Date	Format	Label
Various	18 April 2025	Digital download; streaming	DMW; Columbia; Sony
