= Offa Me =

2025 single by Davido featuring Victoria Monét

Single by Davido featuring Victoria Monét

from the album 5ive
- Released: 17 April 2025
- Recorded: 2025
- Genre: Afrobeats; R&B
- Length: 3:09
- Songwriters: Davido; Victoria Monét; Michaël Brun; Spencer Stewart; Yung Alpha
- Producers: Michaël Brun; Spencer Stewart

Davido singles chronology
"Be There Still" (2025)	"Offa Me" (2025)	"With You" (2025)

Victoria Monét singles chronology
"SOS (Sex on Sight)" (2024)	"Offa Me" (2025)

Music video
- "Offa Me" on YouTube

"Offa Me" is a song by Nigerian-American singer and songwriter Davido featuring Victoria Monét, released on 17 April 2025, as the fourth single from his fifth studio album 5ive. It debuted at number two on the UK Afrobeats Singles Chart and number 5 on the Billboard U.S. Afrobeats Songs chart, making it the first Afrobeats song to simultaneously debut in the top 5 of both charts.

== Background ==
"Offa Me" was recorded in 2024 and reflects Davido's effort to blend Afrobeats with contemporary international sounds. The song features Victoria Monét, an American singer-songwriter.

== Composition ==
"Offa Me" blends Afrobeats and R&B elements, with rhythmic drum patterns and a simple chorus. The song was produced by Michael Brun and Spencer Stewart, incorporating both African and Western sounds.

== Critical reception ==
Steffanee Wang of The Fader described the song as "a tropical banger that's goes down easier than whatever's getting mixed up at your local block party."

== Credits and personnel ==
Credits adapted from Spotify.

- Davido - vocal, songwriting
- Victoria Monét - vocal, songwriting
- Michaël Brun - production, songwriting
- Spencer Stewart - production, songwriting
- Yung Alpha - songwriting

== Charts ==
Chart performance for "Offa Me"
Chart (2025)	Peak position
Nigeria (TurnTable Top 100)	3
UK Afrobeats Singles Chart (OCC)	2
UK Singles Chart (OCC)	93
US Afrobeats Songs (Billboard)	5
US World Digital Song Sales (Billboard)	9
