= Hyce =

Nigerian singer

- Also known as: Hyce The Great
- Born: Favor Ekah Ernest; 13 March 2001 (age 25); Lagos State, Nigeria
- Genre: Afrobeats
- Occupations: Singer; songwriter
- Instrument: Keyboard
- Years active: 2020–present
- Label: Independent

Favor Ekah Ernest (born 13 March 2001), known professionally as Hyce, is a Nigerian singer-songwriter. He rose to stardom with the release of the song "Vanilla" followed by Ogechi with BoyPee and Brown Joel featuring Davido on the remix which peaked number 1 on official Nigeria TurnTable Top 100 songs, official Top Radio songs chart and was ranked the most searched song lyrics of 2024 in Nigeria by Google.

== Early life ==
Hyce was born in Isikalu street, Ajegunle, Lagos State, Nigeria and hails from Uyo, Akwa Ibom State, he attended Heritage Nursery and Primary school, Ajegunle and Cedarville College, Ijanikin. He started music from church where his father served as a pastor, playing instruments at a young age.

== Career ==
Hyce began his professional music career in 2020 and released his debut single, "Owo" in 2021, featuring Soundz. In December 2022, Hyce gained recognition with the release of "Vanilla" which became a viral hit on TikTok, generating over one million user-generated content posts. In May 2024, Hyce collaborated with Boypee & Brown Joel on their hit single titled "Ogechi" and the remix featuring Davido which peaked number 1 on official Nigeria TurnTable Top 100 songs, Top Streaming Songs and top Radio songs chart. On 11 December 2024, Ogechi was ranked as the most searched song lyrics of 2024 in Nigeria by Google On 14 June, 2024, he ranked at number 3 on TurnTable's NXT Emerging Top Artistes for 9 weeks. On 3 January 2025, he ranked at number 9 on TurnTable's Official Artistes Top 100 and spent 32 weeks. In an interview with This Day journalist Sunday Ehigiator, Hyce recounted an experience involving Nigerian artist Davido. He explained that one evening, Boypee informed him that Davido was interested in collaborating on the track "Ogechi" The meeting took place at Davido's residence two nights before his wedding to Chioma. According to Hyce, Davido expressed excitement about the project, stating, This will be released on my wedding day On 2 September 2024, Hyce collaborated with Boypee & Brown Joel yet on another single titled "Constantly" which peaked at 34 on official Nigeria TurnTable Top 100 songs on September 6th, 2024 and spent 2 weeks.

== Discography ==
=== Singles ===
- "Owo" (2021)
- "Vanilla" (2022)
- "Necessary" (2023)
- "Fed Up" (2023)
- "Mind" (2024)
- "Ogechi" (2024)
- "Ogechi Remix" feat. Davido (2024)
- "Constantly" (2024)

=== As featured ===
Taves "Adanna" feat. Hyce, Brown Joel & Boypee
