= Awuke =

2024 single by Davido and YG Marley

Single by Davido and YG Marley

from the album 5ive
- Released: 31 October 2024
- Recorded: 2024
- Genre: Afrobeats; Amapiano
- Length: 2:53
- Label: Columbia
- Songwriters: David Adeleke; Moonlight AfriQA
- Producers: MikabaBeatz; Marvey Muzique

Davido singles chronology
"Right Now" (2024)	"Awuke" (2024)	"Funds" (2024)

YG Marley singles chronology
"Survival" (2024)	"Awuke" (2024)

Music video
- "Awuke" on YouTube

"Awuke" is a song by Nigerian singer and record producer Davido and American singer YG Marley. It was released on 31 October 2024 by Columbia Records. The song was written by Davido and Moonlight AfriQA. The song reached the top ten on the US Billboard Afrobeats Songs chart.

== Background ==
After being featured on two songs, "Joy" by Angélique Kidjo, and "Right Now" by Darkoo featuring Jamaican record producer Rvssian, Davido teased his new song. He first shared the snippet of the song on 1 October 2024, while celebrating Nigeria's Independence Day, and again during Lauryn Hill's concert in Paris, France. On 22 October 2024, he announced on X and Instagram that the song would be released on 31 October 2024.

== Composition ==
The song blends Afrobeats and Amapiano, featuring sweet melodies, tunes, Amapiano whistle beats, and heavy drum bass percussion. It centers on admiration for a love interest, with Davido and YG Marley singing about beauty, maturation, and perseverance.

== Reception ==
Nosakhale Akhimien of Premium Times described the track as a vibrant love song and celebration of African identity. According to Akhimien, "Davido and YG Marley’s vocals create a smooth, balanced production. Davido’s delivery is confident and passionate, showcasing his signature vocal style that combines pop sensibility with Afrobeat’s rhythmic intensity. YG Marley’s addition brings a refreshing vibe."

== Music video ==
The song was released alongside its music video, which was directed by Daps. The video ranked number 4 on YouTube's trending videos in Nigeria.

== Credits and personnel ==
Credits adapted from Spotify.

- Davido – vocals, songwriting
- YG Marley – vocals
- MOONLIGHT AFRIQA – songwriting
- Mikababeatz – production
- Marvey Muzique – co-producer
- Aidan Duncan – mixing engineer
- Leandro Hildago – mixing engineer, mastering engineer

== Charts ==
Chart performance for "Awuke"
Chart (2024)	Peak position
Nigeria (TurnTable)	1
UK Afrobeats (Official Charts)	2
US Afrobeats Songs (Billboard)	9
US Rhythmic Airplay (Billboard)	31
