= Morravey =

Nigerian singer

- Born: Daniella Ibinabo Daniel; March 13, 2004 (age 22); Port, Rivers State, Nigeria
- Origin: Kalabari
- Genres: Afrobeats; Afrobeat; Afro R&B; Afropop
- Occupations: Singer; songwriter
- Instruments: Vocals; guitar; shekere
- Years active: 2020–present
- Labels: DMW; SMEA
- Website: morravey.com

Daniella Ibinabo Daniel (/ˌɪbɪˈnɑːboʊ/ ee-bih-NAH-boh; (born 13 March 2004), known professionally as Morravey, is a Nigerian singer and songwriter. She is best known for her appearance on Davido's 2023 song "In the Garden," which entered the TurnTable Top 100. She signed with Sony Music Africa to release her debut extended play Ravi that same year, which peaked at number thirty three on the TurnTable Top 50 chart.

== Early life ==
Daniella Ibinabo Daniel was born on March 13, 2004, in Port Harcourt, Rivers State. She is the oldest of five siblings and the first daughter of her parents. From a young age, Daniella began performing at local events, church choirs, and school functions.

My first meaningful experience with music wasn't the typical choir routine, although I briefly joined one. However, I quickly realized it wasn't my path. My most memorable musical experience was mimicking songs I loved and enjoyed as a child. I continued doing this until I developed confidence in my tone and singing abilities. As I grew more confident, I started writing my own songs.

== Career ==
=== 2020–2023: Career beginnings and RAVI ===
Morravey began her music career in 2020 by posting song covers on social media. In 2023, while practicing a cover, a friend secretly recorded her and posted the video weeks later without her knowledge. Unbeknownst to Morravey, the video went viral.

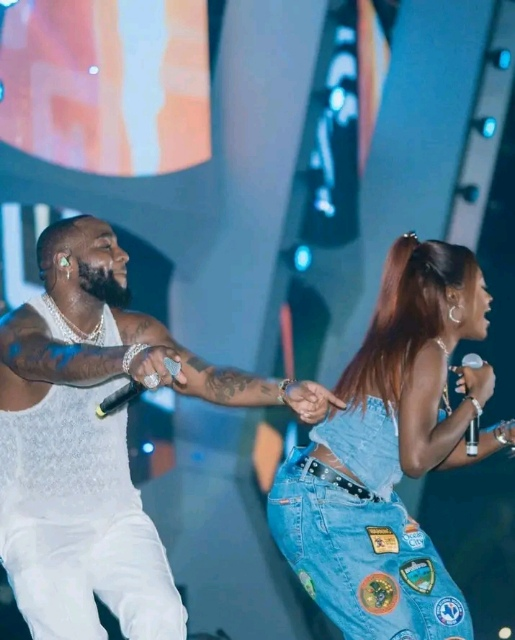
Davido & Morravey, performing in a show together

Nigerian singer Davido discovered her talent through the video and subsequently offered her a recording contract with DMW. On March 31, 2023, Davido released his fourth studio album, Timeless, featuring Morravey on the track "In the Garden". This collaboration served as Morravey's debut single and contributed to her rise to fame, debuting at number 83 on the TurnTable Top 100 chart. After her successful collaboration with Davido, Morravey performed live sessions of "Feel" and "In the Garden" with Glitch Africa.

On November 2, 2023, she released her debut extended play (EP), RAVI, featuring Davido. Adeayo Adebiyi of Pulse Nigeria praised the EP as "a bold statement of intent where the music speaks for itself," rating it 7/10 and highlighting her readiness to enter the mainstream. The EP charted on Apple Music's Albums chart in various countries, peaking at No. 4 in Nigeria, No. 6 in Cameroon, No. 97 in the UK, and No. 33 on the TurnTable Top 50. On November 7, she was named Apple Music's Latest Act. She subsequently released the official music video for "Magician", a standout track from her debut EP, RAVI.

=== 2024–present ===
In May 2024, she released the music video for "Condo". This was followed by the remix "What is Love", featuring DJY Wagner Musiq, released on September 5, 2024. On September 27, Morravey dropped her single "Ifineme" via Entertainment West Africa Limited. Capping off a successful quarter, she was named one of Billboard's Afrobeats Fresh Picks on September 30, alongside notable artists Oxlade, Fireboy DML, and Mofe.

== Discography ==
=== EPs ===
List of extended plays, with selected details
Title	Details
RAVI	Released: 2 November 2023; Label: Sony Music Africa; Formats: Digital download

=== Singles ===
==== As lead artist ====
List of singles as lead artist, with year released and album shown
Title	Year	Album
"What is Love"	2023	RAVI
"High Again"	2023	RAVI
"Condo"	2023	RAVI
"My Baby"	2023	RAVI
"Magician" (with Davido)	2023	RAVI
"Ifineme"	2024	Non-album singles
"Upstandin"	2024	Non-album singles

==== As featured artist ====
List of singles as featured artist, with year released and album shown
Title	Year	Album
"In The Garden"	2023	Timeless

== Tours ==
=== Supporting ===
- Timeless North America Tour
