= Stand Strong =

Single by Davido featuring the Sunday Service Choir
- Released: 13 May 2022
- Genre: Afropop, Afrobeats
- Length: 3:02
- Label: DMW; Sony
- Songwriters: David Adeleke; The Samples
- Producer: Pheelz

Davido singles chronology
"Like" (2022)	"Stand Strong" (2022)	"Mwen Love Ou" (2023)

Music video
- "Stand Strong" on YouTube

"Stand Strong" is a song by Nigerian singer Davido. It was released on 13 May 2022, through Davido Music Worldwide and Sony Music Entertainment UK. "Stand Strong" was written by Davido and the Samples, a member of the American gospel group Sunday Service Choir, and produced by Pheelz. The music video was released on 25 May 2022. The song peaked at number 6 on TurnTable Top 50 chart, and reached number 9 on both the Billboard U.S. Afrobeats Songs chart and UK Afrobeats Singles chart.

== Background ==
Davido and Pheelz served as the executive producers of "Stand Strong". Pheelz handled the beat production, with the help of Jason White, who is the choir director of the Samples, handled the choir vocal production, with Bankulli, who is an A&R, overseeing the Samples vocal production. Davido released "Stand Strong" on 13 May 2022, as the lead single from his next studio album.

== Commercial performance ==
During its debut week, "Stand Strong" peaked at number one on Apple Music in Nigeria and was replaced by burna boy’s “last last” few hours later. On 22 May 2022, it debuted at number 9 on the UK Afrobeats Singles chart. On 23 May 2022, it debuted at number 6 on the Nigeria TurnTable Top 50 chart. On 25 May 2022, it debuted at number 9 on the Billboard U.S. Afrobeats Songs chart, and TurnTable Top 50 Streaming Songs chart, it also debuted at number 2 on the TurnTable Top 50 Airplay. "Stand Strong" has received 4.7 million Boomplay streams as of 27 May 2022.

== Accolades ==
Year	Ceremony	Nominee/work	Award	Result	Ref
2023	The Headies	"Stand Strong"	Best Recording of the Year	Nominated	
2023	The Headies	"Stand Strong"	Best Inspirational Single	Nominated	

== Charts ==
Chart (2022)	Peak position
Nigeria (TurnTable Top 50)	6
Top 50 Streaming Songs (TurnTable)	9
TurnTable Top 50 Airplay (TurnTable)	2
UK Afrobeats (OCC)	9
US Afrobeats Songs (Billboard)	9

== Release history ==
Release history for "Stand Strong"
Region	Date	Format	Label	Ref.
Various	13 May 2022	Digital download; streaming	Davido Music Worldwide; Sony	
