= Fresh VDM =

Nigerian record producer

- Born: Bello Emmanuel Oluwashina; 1 February 1992 (age 34); Togo, Lome
- Origin: Ilorin, Kwara State, Nigeria
- Genres: Pop music, Afro pop music
- Occupation: Record producer
- Instruments: Flute; Piano; Drums; Synthesizer
- Years active: 2016–present

Bello Emmanuel Oluwashina (born February 1, 1992, professionally known as Fresh VDM) is a Nigerian record producer, and musician. Known for producing Davido’s hit single “Fia” which was nominated for song of the year and best pop single at The Headies 2018 award.

He is currently signed to Davido Music Worldwide.

== Early life and education ==
Bello Emmanuel Oluwashina was born in Togo, lome. He spent his childhood in Lome, Togo, before returning to Nigeria as a teen. He went to secondary school at Vale College, Ibadan, Oyo State and studied International Relations and Diplomacy at Lead City University

== Career ==
On November 10, 2017, He produced Davido’s hit single “Fia”

In 2018 Davido officially signed him to DMW as the label in-house producer.

In 2018, he was nominated for Producer of the Year at the Soundcity MVP Awards Festival.

In 2018, He won Producer of the Year Award at All Africa Music Awards, and Producer of the Year at the City People Entertainment Awards.

== Production discography ==
Title	Year	Artiste(s)	Ref(s)
"OBT"	2015	Dremo	
"Normal Levelz"	2015	Dremo feat. Ichaba	
"Mandem"	2016	Burna Boy	
"Back to Back"	2016	DMW	
"Yawa"	2016	Mayorkun	
"Jisoro"	2016	Ichaba feat. Mayorkun	
"Love You Tire"	2016	Mayorkun feat. Mr Eazi	
"12 Bang"	2016	Dremo feat. Davido	
"Prayer"	2017	Mayorkun feat. Davido	
"FIA"	2017	Davido	
"Las Vegas"	2017	Yonda	
"Bambiala"	2017	Danagog feat. Davido & Mayor	
"Escobar"	2017	Dotman feat. Davido	
"Las Vegas Remix"	2017	Yonda feat. Burna Boy	
"Ada"	2018	Ecool feat. Davido	
"Flora my FLAWA"	2018	Davido	
"AJE"	2018	DMW	
”Mind”	2018	DMW	
"Aza"	2018	DMW	
"Check on you"	2018	CASSPER Nyovest feat. Davido	
"Meji Meji"	2018	Kwame Eugene & Davido	
"Red Handed"	2018	Mayorkun feat. Peruzzi, Dremo & Yonda	
"Drama queen"	2018	Mayorkun	
"Tire"	2018	Mayorkun	
"On a Jay"	2018	The Flowolf feat. Mayorkun & Dremo	
"Fia Remix"	2018	Davido feat. Stefflon Don	
"4U"	2018	Ecool feat. Peruzzi & Davido	
"Twisted"	2018	DMW	
"Nwa Baby"	2018	Davido	
"Kilode"	2019	Pryme feat. Peruzzi & Davido	
"Konjinaba"	2018	Dremo feat. Naira Marley	
"My Head"	2018	2sec feat. Davido & Peruzzi	
"Yawa"	2018	Ice prince feat. Peruzzi	
"Dina"	2018	Popcaan feat. Barry Jhay & Peruzzi	
"Dumebi"	2018	Davido, Fiokee & Peruzzi	
"Animashaun"	2019	Davido feat. Yonda	
"Cinderella"	2019	Kidi feat. Peruzzi & Mayorkun	
"Happy and Wealthy"	2019	Popcaan	
"What If"	2019	Yung6ix feat. Peruzzi	
"Mood"	2019	Dammy Krane feat. Mayorkun	
"Ogbono"	2019	Mc Galaxy	
"Doe"	2019	Larry Gaga feat. Davido	
"Work (Living in Bondage OST)"	2019	Larry Gaaga feat. Davido	
"What Type of Dance"	2020	DJ Kaywise feat. Mayorkun, Naira Marley & Zlatan	
"Kole re Body"	2020	Lil Frosh ft Mayorkun	
"Pongilah"	2020	Slimcase feat. Zlatan	
"Of Lagos"	2020	Mayorkun	
"Ginger Me"	2020	Sound Sultan feat. Peruzzi	
"Only You"	2020	Barry Jhay feat. Davido	
"The Best"	2020	Davido feat. Mayorkun	
"I Got A Friend"	2020	Davido feat. Sho Madjozi & Mayorkun	
"E be Tins"	2020	Dremo feat. Mayorkun	
"African Vibe Amapiano Remix"	2020	Ayanfe	
"Somebody Baby"	2021	Peruzzi feat. Davido	
"God Forbid"	2021	Peruzzi	

== Awards and nominations ==
Year	Event	Prize	Recipient	Result	Ref(s)
2018	City People Entertainment Awards	Producer of the Year	”Himself”	Won	
2018	Nigeria Entertainment Awards	Producer of the Year	”Himself”	Won	
2018	All Africa Music Awards	Producer of the Year	”Himself”	Won	
2019	Soundcity MVP Awards Festival	Producer of the Year	”Himself”	Nominated	
