= Top Naija Music Awards =

Annual award event

- Current: 2021 Top Naija Music Awards
- Awarded for: Emerging Raising Star
- Country: Nigeria
- Presented by: Top Naija Music
- First award: December 28, 2012
- Website: Official website

Television/radio coverage
- Network: TopNaijaMusic
- Produced by: Paul Oghoghorie
- Directed by: Paul Oghoghorie

Top Naija Music Awards (abbreviated TNMA Awards) is an annual event for emerging recording singers, songwriters, and producers in Nigeria.

== History ==
The event is composed of 26 categories. The first edition of the Top Naija Music Awards was held on 28 December 2012 at the Blue Pearl Hall, Toyin Street, Ikeja, Lagos State. Its second edition was held on 16 May 2015 at Victoria Island, with host Denrele Edun, as it honors Nigerian emerging stars at the ceremony, and awarded Reekado Banks for Revelation of the Year at the event.

At the seventh edition of the TNMA Awards, one of the winners got a support funds from the organizers.

== Ceremonies ==
#	Date	Venue	Host city	Host
1st	28 December 2012	Blue Pearl Hall, Toyin Street, Ikeja	Lagos	
2nd	17 May 2014	DPlace, Victoria Island	Lagos	Denrele Edun, Paul Oghoghorie
3rd	29 January 2016	Monty Buffet, Victoria Island	Lagos	
4th	2 January 2017	Oriental Hotel, Victoria Island	Lagos	
5th	3 February 2018	Oriental Hotel, Victoria Island	Lagos	
6th	1 June 2019	Lekki	Lagos	
7th	22 March 2020	Virgin Rose Resort, Victoria Island	Lagos	
8th	9 January 2022		Lagos	

== Award categories ==
- Artiste of the Year
- Best Afro Pop Single
- Best Collaboration with "A" List Artiste
- Best Alternative Single
- Best Collaboration
- Best Song/Sound Recording
- Best Street Single
- Best Gospel Single
- Best Rap Single
- Best DJ
- Best RNB Single
- Best Teen Act (Male)
- Best Teen Act (female)
- Industrious Act
- Best Inspirational Song with a Message
- Best Afro Reggae Single
- EP/Album of the year
- Best Foreign Based Nigerian Artiste
- Best Music Video
- Best Record Label
- Music Video Director
- Artiste With Potential
- Best Commercial Single
- Best Sound Recording / Artiste to Watch
- Best Hip Hop Single
- Artiste With Potential

=== Past award categories ===
Next 2 Stardom Award (2015)
Year	Recipient	Result
2015	Humblesmith	Won
2015	Timeyin	Won
2015	Doxy	Won
2015	Meyar Oti	Won
2015	Sprintzee	Won
Artist of the Year (Male))
Year	Recipient	Result
2018	Sonorous	Won
2017	B-Red	Won
2016	Mr Eazi	Won
2015	Falz	Won
2015	Kizz Daniel	Nominated
2015	Adekunle Gold	Nominated
2014	Brain Boi	Won
2014	Korede Bello	Nominated
2014	Lil Kesh	Nominated
2014	Tekno	Nominated
Revelation of the Year (2014–15)
Year	Recipient	Result
2015	Ycee	Won
2014	Reekado Banks	Won
2014	Tekno	Nominated
2014	Lil Kesh	Nominated
Best Music Video
Year	Recipient(s) and nominee(s)	Result
2021	Cactus - Davictim	Won
2017	Street - Cixqo Featuring. Pompay, Steven Tones and Yunqblood	Won
2017	Finally - B-Red	Nominated
2017	Colours - Mars And Barzini	Nominated
2017	Long Time - Yungzee Onos Featuring. Defizy & Taurushood	Nominated
2017	Baby O - Jayson	Nominated
2017	Slamalaikum - Litmus	Nominated
2017	Don’t Rush - Kayode	Nominated
2017	Bamijo - Fonzyfwesh	Nominated
2017	I dey 2much - Vickyqee Featuring. Mike Abdul	Nominated
2017	Momore - Living World Family [LWF] Featuring. Ola	Nominated
2017	Ayo Ni - Bjaylawrenz	Nominated
2016	Gbemidebe - Youngluck	Won
Best Collaboration
Year	Recipient(s) and nominee(s)	Result
2018	Frankool	Won
2016	Muziq (Orin) - Dj Timic Feat. Aiibeekay, Yanky, Aj’Mykel, Raxx, Spectacular & Wytte	Won
2016	Street - Cixqo	Nominated
2016	Bless My Hustle - Bobby T Featuring. Small Doctor	Nominated
2016	Ikebe Remix - Kiddo Featuring. Sunny J & Mahrizzi	Nominated
Best Rap Single
Year	Recipient(s) and nominee(s)	Result
2018	King Supremez	Won
Best Hip Hop Single
Year	Recipient(s) and nominee(s)	Result
2018	Synapse	Won

- Recognition Award
- Best Vocal Artiste (Male)
- Best Vocal Artiste (Female)
- Legendary Award
- Indigenous Act Award
- Pop/Rock Act With Potential Award
- Male Act With Potential Award
- Female Act With Potential Award
- Highlife Act With Potential Award
- Hip Hop Act With Potential Award
- Indigenous Act With Potential Award
- Gospel Music Icon Award
- Most Promising Artiste (Male)
- Most Promising Artiste (Female)
- Best Lyrical Exploration/Lyricist (Male/Female)
- Best Afro Hip Hop Single
- Highlife Act With Potential
- Best Gospel Music Video
- Best Recording with A List Act
- Best Indigenous Single
- Emerging Male Act With Potential
- Emerging Female Act With Potential
- Emerging Gospel Act of the Year
- Recording of the Year
- Best Nigerian International Act
- Best Performing Act
