= Be There Still =

2025 single by Davido

Single by Davido

from the album 5ive
- Released: 14 March 2025
- Recorded: 2025
- Genre: Afrobeats; Amapiano
- Length: 3:16
- Songwriters: Davido; Ibrahim Ayobami Bakare; Nwamu Francis Chukwudubem
- Producers: Marvey Muzique; DJ Maphorisa; Black Culture

Davido singles chronology
"Funds" (2024)	"Be There Still" (2025)	"Offa Me" (2025)

Music video
- "Be There Still" on YouTube

"Be There Still" is a song by Nigerian-American singer and songwriter Davido released on 14 March 2025, as the third single from his fifth studio album 5ive.
