= B-Red =

Nigerian singer (born 1990)

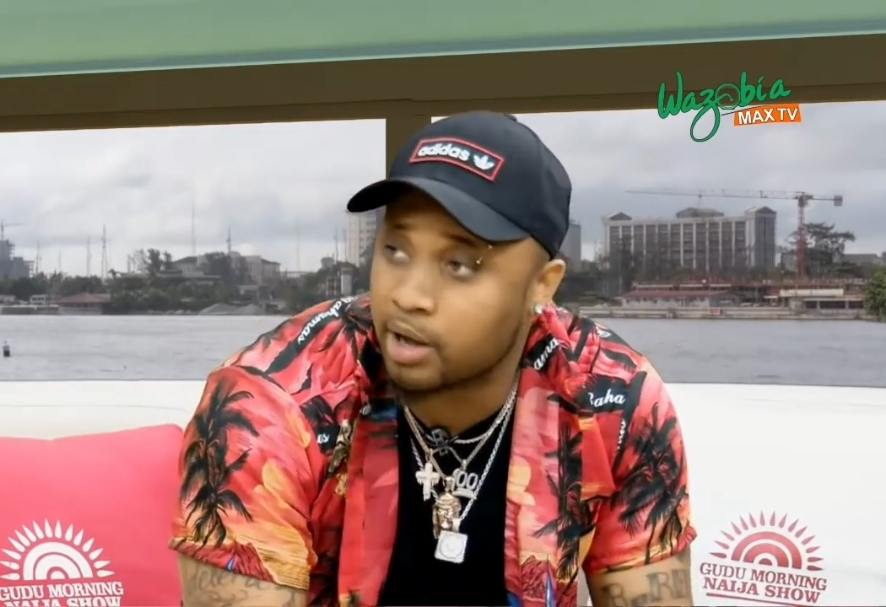
- B-Red in 2022

Background information
- Born: Adebayo Adeleke; July 23, 1990 (age 36); Atlanta, Georgia, U.S
- Genres: Afropop; RnB
- Occupation: Singer
- Years active: 2013–present
- Labels: HKN Music; DMW; Red Nation Records

Adebayo Adeleke (born July 23, 1990), better known by his stage name B-Red, is a Nigerian singer. He is the son of Ademola Adeleke. His career as a solo act started in 2013 with the release of the single "Insane Girl"; the song features vocals from Davido and was produced by Shizzi. In 2016, he released his debut EP All the Way Up.

== Early life ==
Born in Atlanta, Georgia, United States, the son of Nigerian governor Ademola Adeleke, B-Red relocated to Nigeria to pursue a musical career, He is Davido's cousin.

== Career ==
In his five years in HKN Music, he released the single "Insane Girl" in 2013 the song features Davido and was produced by Shizzi. In 2016 the sole project he released was an extended play EP in mid-2016, All The Way Up, the EP contained eight songs, including six bonus tracks, which were mostly pre-released singles. He released a number of singles between 2013 and 2015, including "Uju" and "Cucumber" featuring Akon. in April 2019, the HKN Singer and songwriter, B-Red dropped two songs titled "E Better" featuring Mavin Records boss, Don Jazzy and "Achie" featuring award-winning artiste, Davido. In 2020, B-Red released a studio album under Davido Music Worldwide titled "The Jordan Album" the intro featured a guest feature from his father Ademola Adeleke, the album featured 2Baba, Davido, Slimcase, Dremo, Sina Rambo, Mayorkun, Peruzzi, etc. B-Red is currently signed to his record label Red Nation Records.

== Discography ==
=== EPs ===
- All the Way Up (2016)

=== Albums ===
- Good Music For Bad Days (2022)
- The Jordan (2020)

== Awards and nominations ==
=== Top Naija Music Awards ===
Year	Nominee / work	Award	Result	Ref
2017	Himself	Artiste of the Year	Won	
