= Gobe (song) =

Single by Davido
- Released: 25 February 2013
- Recorded: 2013
- Genre: Afrobeats
- Length: 3:49
- Label: HKN Music
- Songwriters: Patrick Mathias; David Adeleke
- Producer: Shizzi

Davido singles chronology
"Feel Alright" (2012)	"Gobe" (2013)	"One of a Kind" (2013)

Music video
- "Gobe" on YouTube

"Gobe" (Yoruba: "Trouble") is a song by Nigerian singer Davido, released on 25 February 2013. It peaked at number one on the MTV Base Official Naija Top Ten chart, surpassing Banky W.'s "Yes/No". The song stayed atop the music chart for three weeks and was eventually toppled by Kcee's "Limpopo". "Gobe" was nominated for Most Popular Song of the Year at the 2013 City People Entertainment Awards and for Best Pop Single at The Headies 2013. The music video for "Gobe" was nominated for Most Gifted Afro Pop Video at the 2013 Channel O Music Video Awards, and for Best Pop Extra Video at the 2013 Nigeria Music Video Awards (NMVA). Furthermore, it was nominated for Best African Act Video at the 2013 4Syte TV Music Video Awards.

== Gobe controversy ==
There were speculations surrounding the song's release. An impersonator of Password created a Twitter account two days after the song's release and accused Davido of theft. Both Davido and Password debunked the rumor by posting several tweets. In an interview with Sunday Beats, Kamal Ajiboye said Davido purchased the song from Password for ₦350,000 and that they didn't know the song had already been released.

== Music video ==
The accompanying music video for "Gobe" was also released on 25 February 2013, at a total length of 4 minutes and 6 seconds. It has surpassed 8 million views on YouTube.

== Critical reception ==
"Gobe" received positive reviews from music critics. Charles Mgbolu of Vanguard said the song "exudes fun from start to finish."

=== Accolades ===
Year	Awards ceremony	Award description(s)	Results
2013	Channel O Music Video Awards	Most Gifted Afro Pop Video	Nominated
2013	Nigeria Music Video Awards (NMVA)	Best Pop Extra Video	Nominated
2013	4Syte TV Music Video Awards	Best African Act Video	Nominated
2013	City People Entertainment Award	Most Popular Song of the Year	Nominated
2013	The Headies	Best Pop Single	Nominated
