= Maryam Bukar Hassan =

Nigerian poet, and spoken word artist

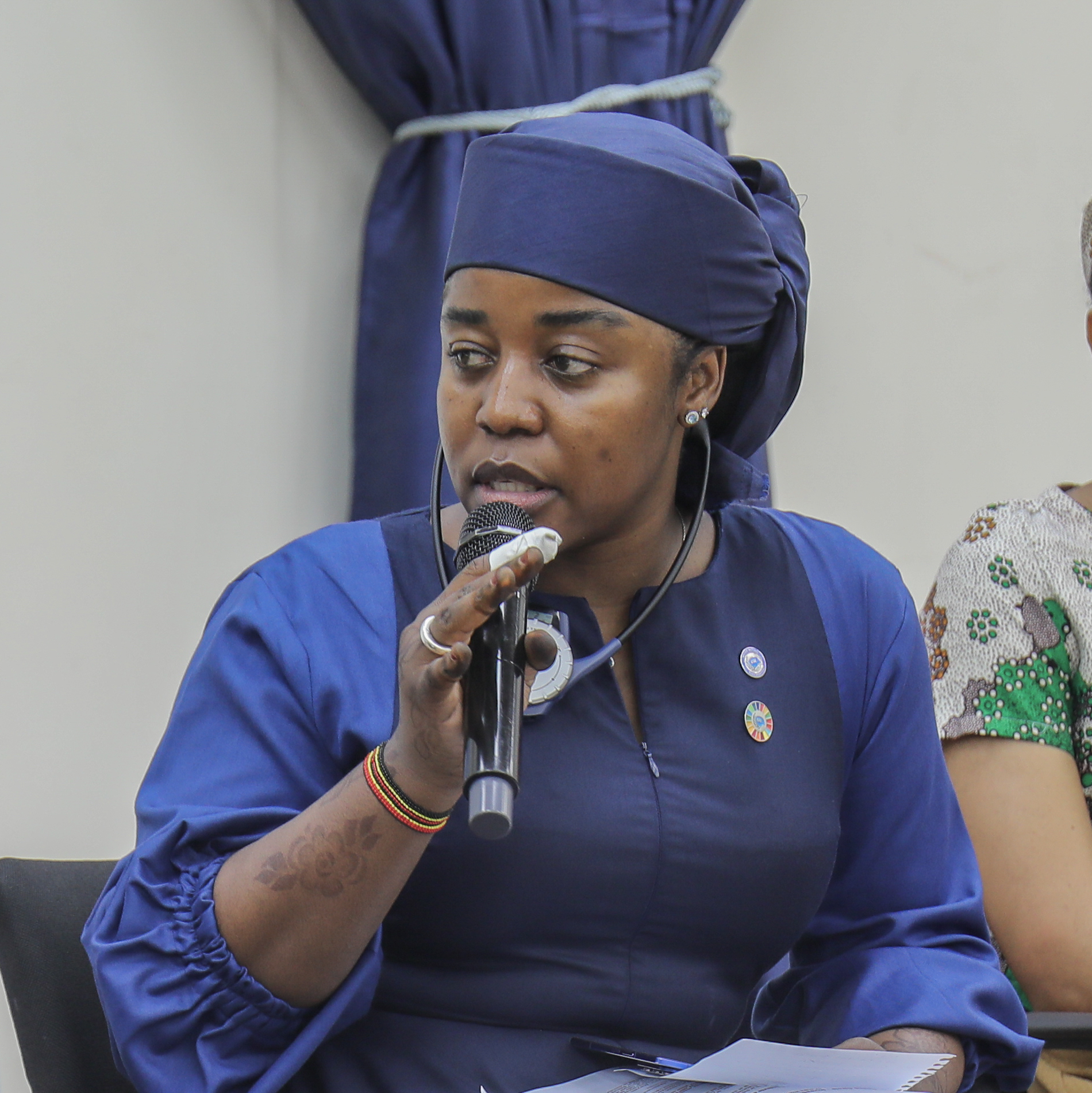
- in Kinshasa in 2026
- Born: 25 December 1996 (age 29); Biu, Borno State, Nigeria
- Citizenship: Nigerian
- Education: Radford University College, Ghana
- Occupations: Poet, Spoken word artist, Storytelling consultant, Social entrepreneur, Content creator
- Writing career
- Pen name: Alhanislam
- Language: Hausa, English
- Years active: 2015 - present
- Genres: Spoken word poetry, Advocacy, Social justice
- Subjects: Peacebuilding, Maternal health, Youth empowerment
- Website: alhanislam.com

Maryam Bukar Hassan (born 25 December 1996) // is a Nigerian poet, spoken word artist, storytelling consultant, social entrepreneur, digital content creator, and the first UN Global Advocate for Peace and Security.

Hassan is an advocate for United Nations peacekeeping, campaign co-ordinator at change.org in Nigeria, and a Gates Foundation goalkeeper. She uses her voice for social change and justice, especially on issues such as peace and maternal mortality.

== Early life and education ==
Hassan is an indigene of Biu, Borno State, Nigeria. She is the only daughter of Hauwa Maina, a Nigerian actress. Hassan completed her secondary education at Uncle Bado Memorial College, Kaduna, and later studied Information Technology at Radford University College in Ghana, an affiliate of Kwame Nkrumah University.

== Career and achievements ==
Hassan has performed at Aké Arts and Book Festival, Kaduna Book and Arts Festival, Harmony for Humanity concert organized by the United States embassy in honor of Daniel Pearl, the Sustainable Development Goals (SDGs) conferences, African Governance Architecture conference, 75th anniversary of United Nations Peacekeeping Operations, African Union 8th high-level dialogue conference 2019 in Kampala, Uganda, Global Citizen Live, and many more.

Hassan is the founder of the True My Voice community, a group of young poets she coaches to enhance their digital advocacy capabilities.

In 2025, Hassan was designated by the United Nations as its first Global Advocate for Peace. She participated in the 2026 Winter Olympics opening ceremony.

== Awards and recognition ==
- Leadership Awards Artiste Of The Year (2021)
- Ooni of Ife's Royal African Young Leadership Forum (RAYLF) Honours (2021)
- Tozali Awards Best Creative Artiste of the Year (2022)

Hassan was recognized as one of the 100 Most Reputable Africans for 2025 by Reputable Poll International (RPI).

== Discography ==
She has released two spoken word albums: In the Heart of Silence (2017) and Layers (2021), which address various social issues. She was a featured artist on Davido's recent album, 5ive. Rendering a poem in the intro track "Five by Alhanislam"
