= Funds (song) =

2024 single by Davido featuring Odumodublvck and Chike

Single by Davido featuring Odumodublvck and Chike

from the album 5ive
- Released: 6 December 2024
- Recorded: 2024
- Genre: Afrobeats; amapiano
- Length: 3:27
- Label: Columbia
- Songwriters: David Adeleke; Tochukwu Ojogwu; Chike Osebuka; Anifowoshe Michael
- Producer: Ucee

Davido singles chronology
"Awuke" (2024)	"Funds" (2024)	"Be There Still" (2025)

Odumodublvck singles chronology
"Big Smile" (2024)	"Funds" (2024)	"Amabanga" (2024)

Chike singles chronology
"Carry Go (remix)" (2024)	"Funds" (2024)	"Love Egbugomo" (2025)

Music video
- "Funds" on YouTube

"Funds" is a song by Nigerian-American singer and songwriter Davido, featuring fellow Nigerian singers Odumodublvck and Chike. It was released as the second single from the former's fifth studio album 5ive (2025) via Columbia Records on 6 December 2024. The song feature a sample of "Vuli Ndlela" by South African singer Brenda Fassie.

== Background and release ==
Between September and November 2024, a snippet of "Funds" with just Odumodublvck began to circulate on Twitter. The track was first recorded by Odumodublvck and Mizzle, who is credited as a co-writer. Reports indicate that Davido later acquired the song, revised Mizzle's part, and included Chike on the final version. On 5 December 2024, Davido previewed "Funds" via an Instagram post. In the accompanying caption, he announced: "We Not Waiting Though! Tonight at midnight I'm dropping a single 'Funds' with @odumodublvck and @officialchike." Furthermore, he disclosed that the track would be featured on his forthcoming fifth studio album, 5ive.

"Funds" was subsequently released on 6 December 2024, via Columbia Records, as the second single from Davido's fifth studio album, 5ive. The song was made available for digital download and streaming.

== Composition and lyrics ==
"Funds" is a blend of Afrobeats and amapiano. It was written by David Adeleke, Tochukwu Ojogwu, Chike Osebuka, and Mizzle, and produced by Ucee. The song runs for three minutes and twenty-seven seconds. The lyrics focus on money, lifestyle, and confidence. In the first verse, Davido talks about his wealth and spending. In the second verse, Odumodublvck talks about street life and his experiences. In the third verse, Chike leans into romance and pride. Notably, "Funds" samples South African music icon Brenda Fassie's classic hit "Vul' Indlela".

== Charts ==
=== Weekly charts ===
Chart performance for "Funds"
Chart (2025)	Peak position
Nigeria (TurnTable Top 100)	1
UK Afrobeats (Official Charts)	2
US Afrobeats Songs (Billboard)	5

=== Year-end charts ===
2025 year-end chart performance for "With You"
Chart (2025)	Position
US Afrobeats Songs (Billboard)	8

== Credits and personnel ==
Credits adapted from Spotify.

- Davido – vocals, songwriting
- Odumodublvck – vocals, songwriting
- Chike – vocals, songwriting
- Mizzle – songwriting
- Ucee – production
- Promise Aroninuola – guitar
- DRO – mixing engineer, mastering engineer
- Marvey Muzique – mixing engineer, additional production
- Aidan Duncan – additional production
