= Son of Mercy =

EP by Davido
- Released: 21 October 2016
- Recorded: 2015–2016
- Genres: Afropop; trap; ragga; highlife; house
- Length: 18:00
- Labels: Sony; DMW
- Producers: Shizzi; Kiddominant; Spellz

Davido chronology
| Omo Baba Olowo (2012) | Son of Mercy (2016) | A Good Time (2019) |

Singles from Son of Mercy
- 1. "Gbagbe Oshi" Released: September 30, 2016; 2. "How Long" Released: October 13, 2016; 3. "Coolest Kid in Africa" Released: November 18, 2016

Son of Mercy is the debut extended play by Nigerian singer Davido. It was released by Sony Music on October 21, 2016. The EP comprises five tracks and was produced by Shizzi, Kiddominant and Spellz. It features guest appearances from Nasty C, Simi and Tinashe. Son of Mercy tackles themes of love and combines elements of Afropop, trap, ragga, highlife and house. It was supported by the singles "Gbagbe Oshi", "How Long" and "Coolest Kid in Africa".

== Background and promotion ==
Davido first announced plans to release Son of Mercy in September 2016, revealing its title and saying it would be released on October 21. Davido recorded majority of the EP's songs in the United States. Son of Mercy was produced by Shizzi, Kiddominant and Spellz, and features collaborations with Nasty C, Simi and Tinashe. In an interview with The Native magazine, Davido criticized Son of Mercy and said he did not select the songs that appeared on it. The lead single, "Gbagbe Oshi" (Yoruba: "Kill the Drama" or "Leave the Matter"), was released on September 30, 2016. The song was produced by Shizzi and released nearly 10 months after Davido signed a recording contract with RCA Records and Sony Music. The accompanying music video for "Gbagbe Oshi" premiered on October 1, in honor of Nigeria's 56th annual Independence Day.

The Tinashe-assisted track "How Long" was released on October 13, 2016, as the second single. The song fuses South African house music with Yoruba lyrics and R&B elements. Davido told Vice he recorded "How Long" the previous year and agreed to put Tinashe on the record after being asked by a label executive to do so. Sabo Kpade commended Davido and Tinashe's sound and said "How Long" was a "smooth ride of a song". The video for "How Long", which was filmed in Malibu, features scenes of Davido arriving to the beach on a motorcycle and Tinashe on a white horse. The Nasty C-assisted track "Coolest Kid in Africa" was released on November 18, 2016, as the third single. The accompanying music video for the song was directed by Sesan Ogunro.

== Composition ==
The Shizzi-produced track "Gbagbe Oshi" contains lyrics recorded in Nigerian Pidgin, Yoruba and patois. From a production standpoint, the song is composed of a muscular beat with two significant drum breaks. The contemporary highlife track "Maga 2 Mugu" features guest vocals by Simi; Chiagoziem of Filter Free Nigeria praised Simi for bringing "calm and sappiness to Davido's hyperactivity and directness". The Spellz-produced track "How Long" contains elements of Afropop and soulful house music. In the Afrobeats-infused trap song "Coolest Kid in Africa", Davido exchanges bars with rapper Nasty C and boasts about not knowing how to save money. The highlife track "Return" focuses on themes of love and begins with an earnest admission about Davido's relationship with an unnamed woman.

== Critical reception ==
Professional ratings
Review scores
| Source | Rating |
|---|---|
| Filter Free Nigeria | 58/100 |
| Pulse Nigeria | 3.5/5 stars |

Son of Mercy received generally mixed reviews from music critics. Chiagoziem Onyekwena of Filter Free Nigeria said listeners who see the EP as a "collection of strategically-placed songs" would appreciate it more than those who see Davido as "one of a few African artists that record labels are telling the world could become the future of music". A writer for Pulse Nigeria awarded Son of Mercy 3.5 stars out of 5, describing it as a balanced project that is "somewhere between experimental and familiar, but weirdly satisfying". OkayAfrica's Sabo Kpade said Simi's voice on "Maga 2 Mugu" is void of "presence despite being pleasant", and criticized "Return" for lacking "a clean thematic consistency".

== Track listing ==
| No. | Title | Writer(s) | Producer(s) | Length |
|---|---|---|---|---|
| 1. | "Gbagbe Oshi" | David Adeleke; Ibrahim Majekodunmi | Shizzi | 3:26 |
| 2. | "Maga 2 Mugu" (featuring Simi) | Adeleke; Simisola Ogunleye | Kiddominant | 3:46 |
| 3. | "Coolest Kid in Africa" (featuring Nasty C) | Adeleke; Nsikayesizwe Ngcobo | Dun Deal | 3:48 |
| 4. | "Return" | Adeleke | Shizzi | 3:05 |
| 5. | "How Long" (featuring Tinashe) | Adeleke; Tinashe Kachingwe | Spellz | 4:09 |
| Total length: | | | | 18:00 |

== Charts ==
| Chart (2019) | Peak position |
|---|---|
| US World Albums (Billboard) | 4 |

== Release history ==
| Region | Date | Format | Version | Label |
|---|---|---|---|---|
| Various | October 21, 2016 | Digital download | Standard | Sony; DMW |
