= YG Marley =

American singer (born 2001)

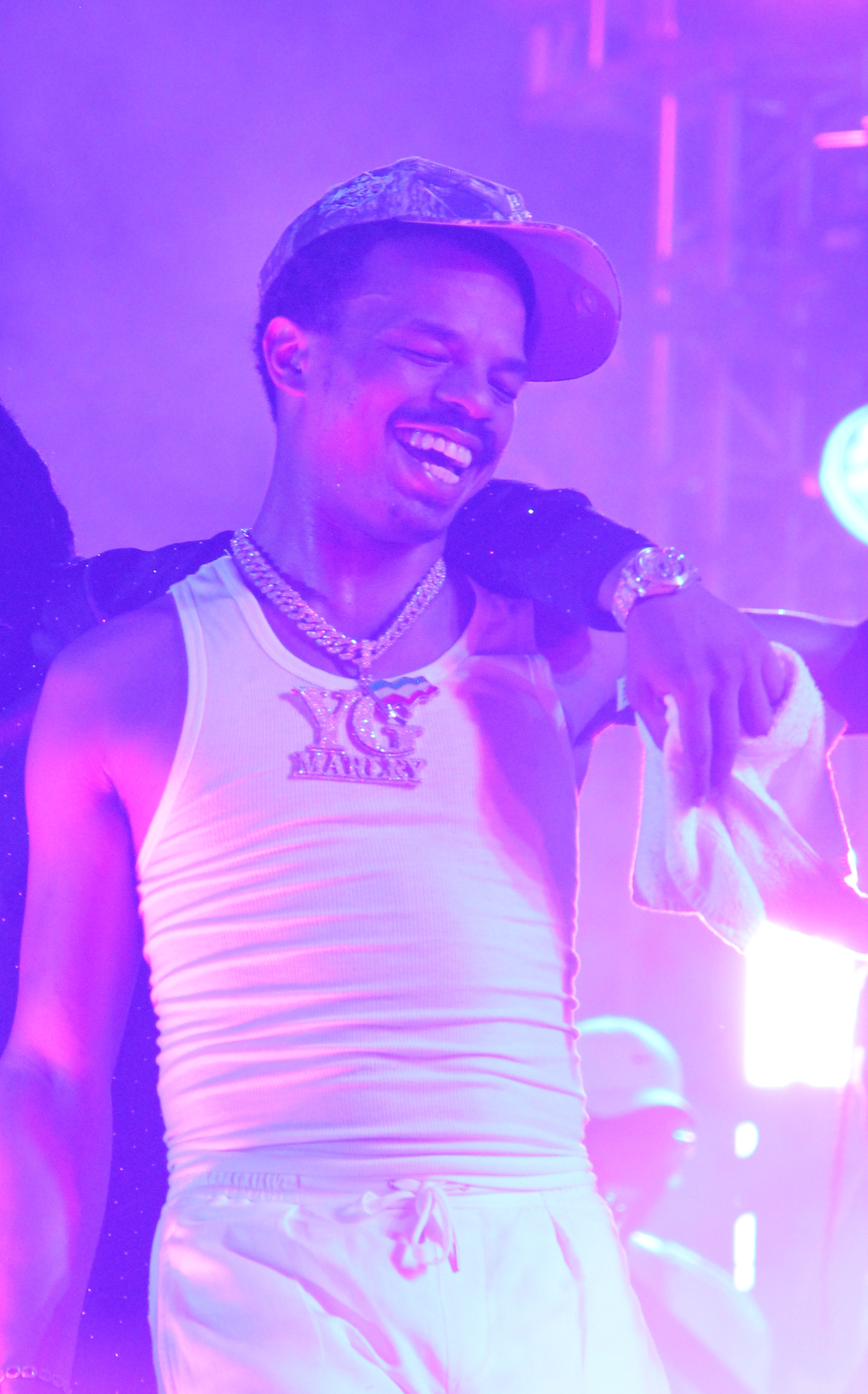
- Marley in 2025 on the JamRock Cruise.
- Born: Joshua Omaru Marley; December 5, 2001 (age 24); Beverly Hills, California, U.S.
- Occupations: Singer; rapper; songwriter
- Years active: 2023–present
- Parents: Rohan Marley (father); Lauryn Hill (mother)
- Relatives: Bob Marley (grandfather); Selah Marley (sister); Nico Marley (half-brother); Ziggy Marley (uncle); Stephen Marley (uncle); Skip Marley (cousin); Isaiah Hill (cousin); Donisha Prendergast (cousin)
- Musical career
- Genre: Reggae
- Instruments: Vocals; guitar; percussion; piano
- Website: www.ygmarley.com

Joshua Omaru "YG" Marley (born December 5, 2001) is an American singer and rapper. He is the son of singer Lauryn Hill and former football player Rohan Marley, and the grandson of reggae pioneer Bob Marley. He rose to prominence with his 2023 debut single "Praise Jah in the Moonlight", which became an international hit, peaking within the top 40 of the Billboard Hot 100 and earning platinum certification from the Recording Industry Association of America (RIAA). He has since collaborated with Busta Rhymes, Coco Jones, and Davido, appearing on the latter's 2024 single "Awuke".

== Early life and career ==
Joshua Omaru Marley was born on December 5, 2001, in Beverly Hills, California. He is the son of American singer Lauryn Hill and Jamaican football player Rohan Marley. His parents never legally married but had a long-term partnership for 15 years. Marley is also the grandson of reggae musician Bob Marley. Marley has numerous siblings and half-siblings between his parents, including sister model Selah Marley and half-brother former NFL player Nico Marley.

He was raised in South Orange, New Jersey. During his childhood, Marley often joined his mother on stage at her concerts. At the age of nine, he declared "I wanna rap" to an audience at Hill's concert. In 2013, he began performing written original material during the shows.

In 2017, he landed a modeling campaign for Urban Outfitters, and was featured alongside his sister Selah in Teen Vogue. In February 2018, he joined his mother during her performance at Woolrich's New York Fashion Week party. The following month, Marley previewed a then unreleased snippet of "Nice for What" by Drake on his Snapchat. In 2020, Marley attended a pre-Grammy Awards brunch hosted by Universal Music Group, and told Billboard that he is "working on new music", and further stated that Hill would be featured on the project. In 2021, Vibe reported that he was featured on a track called "Slick" by Selah Marley.

In late 2023, he began performing an original song, "Praise Jah in the Moonlight", during Hill's concert tour commemorating the 25th anniversary of The Miseducation of Lauryn Hill. Video clips from his performances went viral on social media, most notably on TikTok. On December 27, 2023, Marley officially released "Praise Jah in the Moonlight", his first single. The single quickly became a streaming hit, reaching number one on the United States and Global Spotify Viral 50 charts. In addition to gaining popularity on TikTok, the film Bob Marley: One Love based on Bob's life was released after the debut of YG's single "Praise Jah in the Moonlight".

In January 2024, it was announced that he would be a featured performer at the 2024 Coachella music festival. The following month, "Praise Jah in the Moonlight" peaked at number one in New Zealand; it entered the US Billboard Hot 100, with Marley becoming the sixth member of the Marley family to enter the chart. It also reached the top ten in the United Kingdom and Norway.

In March 2024, Marley appeared on Adin Ross' Kick stream. In May 2024, He released his single "Survival", which sampled his grandfather's song "Ambush In the Night" from his 1979 album of the same name. That same month, he performed the song alongside his mother on The Tonight Show Starring Jimmy Fallon. On July 19, 2024, he released the version featuring Hill entitled "Survival (Version)". The following month, Marley appeared on the song "Never Let You Go" from the album, Trouble in Paradise by singer Chloe Bailey. In October 2024, he collaborated with Nigerian singer Davido on the single "Awuke".

== Discography ==
=== Extended plays ===
List of EPs
Title	EP details
Babylon	Released: 19 June 2026; Label: YG Marley Music, Hitmaker Music Group, Hitmaker Distro; Format: digital download, streaming

EP’s live

List of EPs
Title	EP details
Live in Saudi Arabia	Released: 21 April 2026; Label: YG Marley Music, Hitmaker Distro; Format: digital download, streaming

=== Singles ===
List of singles, with selected chart positions and certifications
Title	Year	Peak chart positions										Certifications	Album
Title	Year	US	AUS	BRA	CAN	IRE	NZ	NOR	SWI	UK	WW	Certifications	Album
"Praise Jah in the Moonlight"	2023	34	19	27	20	13	1	8	5	5	11	RIAA: Platinum; BPI: Platinum; MC: Platinum; RMNZ: Platinum	Non-album singles
"Survival" (Alone or with Lauryn Hill)	2024	—	—	—	—	—	—	—	—	—	—		Non-album singles
"Awuke" (with Davido)	2024	—	—	—	—	—	—	—	—	—	—		Non-album singles
"Blessings"	2025	—	—	—	—	—	—	—	—	—	—		Non-album singles
"Fiyah"	2026	—	—	—	—	—	—	—	—	—	—		Babylon
"—" denotes a recording that did not chart or was not released in that territory.

=== Other appearances ===
List of non-single guest appearances, with other performing artists, showing year released and album name
Title	Year	Other artist(s)	Album	Ref.
"Slick"	2021	Selah Marley	Star Power (EP)	
"Never Let You Go"	2024	Chloe Bailey	Trouble In Paradise	
"Treasure & Gold"	2025	Busta Rhymes	Dragon Season... The Awakening (EP)	
"Why Not More?"	2025	Coco Jones	Why Not More?	

== Awards and nominations ==
Year	Award	Category	Work	Result	Ref.
2025	MOBO Awards	Best Caribbean music act	Himself	Nominated	
2025	IHeartRadio Music Awards	World Artist of the Year	Himself	Nominated	
2025	International Reggae and World Music Awards	Best New Entertainer	Himself	Won	
2025	International Reggae and World Music Awards	Best Male Vocalist	Himself	Nominated	
2025	International Reggae and World Music Awards	Best Crossover Song	"Awuke"	Nominated	
2025	International Reggae and World Music Awards	Best Song	"Praise Jah in the Moonlight"	Nominated	
2025	International Reggae and World Music Awards	Best Music Video	"Praise Jah in the Moonlight"	Nominated	
2025	Caribbean Music Awards	Impact Award (Reggae)	Himself	Won	
