= Davido =

Nigerian-American singer (born 1992)

Davido OON
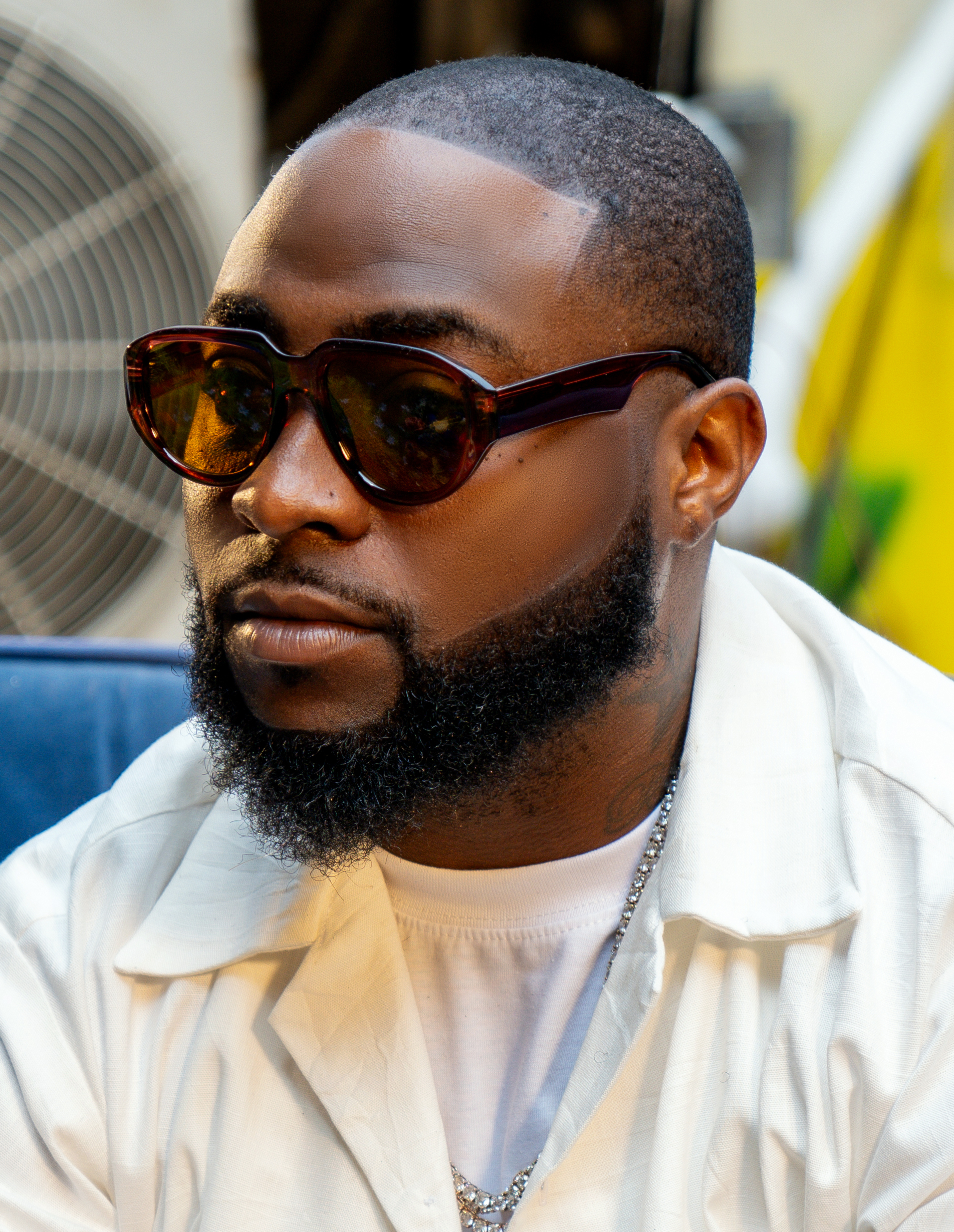
- Davido in 2024
- Born: David Adedeji Adeleke; November 21, 1992 (age 33); Atlanta, Georgia, U.S.
- Citizenship: Nigerian, American
- Occupations: Singer; songwriter; record producer
- Years active: 2010–present
- Notable work: Discography
- Spouse: Chioma Rowland Adeleke (m. 2023)
- Awards: Full list
- Musical career
- Genres: Afrobeats; afropop; R&B; afrobeat; dancehall
- Instruments: Vocals; keyboards
- Labels: DMW; Sony; Columbia; RCA; Nine+ Records
- Website: iamdavido.com

David Adedeji Adeleke (born November 21, 1992), known professionally as Davido, is a Nigerian-American singer, songwriter, and record producer. Davido was born in Atlanta, U.S., and raised in Lagos, Nigeria. He made his music debut as a member of the group KB International. Davido studied business administration at Oakwood University before dropping out to make beats and record vocal references. He rose to fame after releasing "Dami Duro", the second single from his debut studio album Omo Baba Olowo (2012), from which six additional singles—"Back When", "Ekuro", "Overseas", "All of You", "Gbon Gbon" and "Feel Alright"—were taken. In 2012, Davido won the Next Rated award at The Headies. Between 2013 and 2015, he released the singles "Gobe", "One of a Kind", "Skelewu", "Aye", "Tchelete (Goodlife)", "Naughty", "Owo Ni Koko", "The Sound" and "The Money".

In January 2016, Davido announced on Twitter that he had signed a record deal with Sony Music and a few months later, he founded the record label Davido Music Worldwide, to which artists including Morravey and Logos Olori are currently signed. In July 2016, Davido signed a record deal with Sony's RCA Records and in October the same year, he released the five-track Extended Play (EP) Son of Mercy, which was supported by the singles "Gbagbe Oshi", "How Long" and "Coolest Kid in Africa". In 2017, Davido re-negotiated his contract with Sony due to creative control issues and released five singles, including "If" and "Fall". "If" generated worldwide social-media activity while "Fall" became the longest-charting Nigerian pop song in Billboard history. In November 2019, Davido released his second studio album A Good Time, which was supported by the previously released singles "If", "Fall", "Assurance", "Blow My Mind" and "Risky".

In 2019, New African magazine listed Davido as one of the 100 most-influential Africans. His third studio album, A Better Time, was released on November 13, 2020. In February 2021, Davido appeared on Time 100's Next List. He released Timeless, his fourth studio album, on March 31, 2023. Two years later, he released 5ive, his fifth studio album. Davido is a cultural ambassador for Nigeria and a prominent voice of human rights in Africa. He is also one of the most-followed African artists on Instagram and Twitter.

== Life and career ==
=== Early life and education ===
David Adedeji Adeleke was born on November 21, 1992, in Atlanta, Georgia, United States. His father Adedeji Adeleke (born 1957) is a business magnate from Nigeria, and his mother Vero Adeleke (1963–2003) was a university lecturer. Davido is the youngest of five siblings and his father's third-born son. He attended the British International School in Lagos, and at the age of 16, he returned to the U.S. to study business administration at Oakwood University.

While at Oakwood, Davido bought musical equipment and started making beats. He also formed the music act KB International with his cousins B-Red and Sina Rambo. Davido dropped out of Oakwood University to pursue music full-time and relocated to London, where he worked on his vocals. After returning to Nigeria in 2011, Davido paused his music career and agreed to honor his father by enrolling at Babcock University, from which he graduated in July 2015, with a degree in music after his father paid the university to start a music department for an inaugural class of one student.

=== 2011–2012: Early career and Omo Baba Olowo ===
Davido began his music career professionally in March 2011. That same year, he started working on his debut studio album Omo Baba Olowo, which is a mixture of Afrobeats and hip hop. Davido worked with Jay Sleek, Maleek Berry, GospelOnDeBeatz, Spellz, Dokta Frabz, Mr. Chidoo, Theory Soundz and Shizzi to produce the album. Omo Baba Olowo features guest appearances from Naeto C, Sina Rambo, B-Red, Kayswitch, Ice Prince and 2 Face Idibia. It received generally negative reviews from music critics, who panned its lyrical content and Davido's songwriting. The album won Best R&B/Pop Album and received a nomination for Album of the Year at The Headies 2013, and for Best Album of the Year at the 2013 Nigeria Entertainment Awards.

The Naeto C-assisted track "Back When" was released as the album's lead single on May 7, 2011. It was produced in London by Davido and received frequent airplay. The Clarence Peters-directed music video for "Back When" was uploaded to YouTube on May 9, 2011. Davido and Shizzi produced the album's second single "Dami Duro", which was released on October 30, 2011. In an interview posted on the NotJustOk website, Davido said he recorded the song in August of that year. The song was leaked three months after he sent it to some of his friends. The accompanying music video for "Dami Duro" was released on January 8, 2012, during the Occupy Nigeria protests.

The album's third single "Ekuro" was released on January 25, 2012. Its music video was recorded and directed in Miami by Antwan Smith. Nigerian singer Aramide released a soulful cover of the song. The album's fourth single "Overseas" was released on May 6, 2012; an unfinished version of the song was leaked prior to its official release. The GospelOnDeBeatz-produced track "All of You" was released as the album's fifth single on September 28, 2012; Davido said he recorded the song with GospelOnDeBeatz' whom he met at a mall.

=== 2013–2016: Standalone releases, The Baddest and Son of Mercy ===
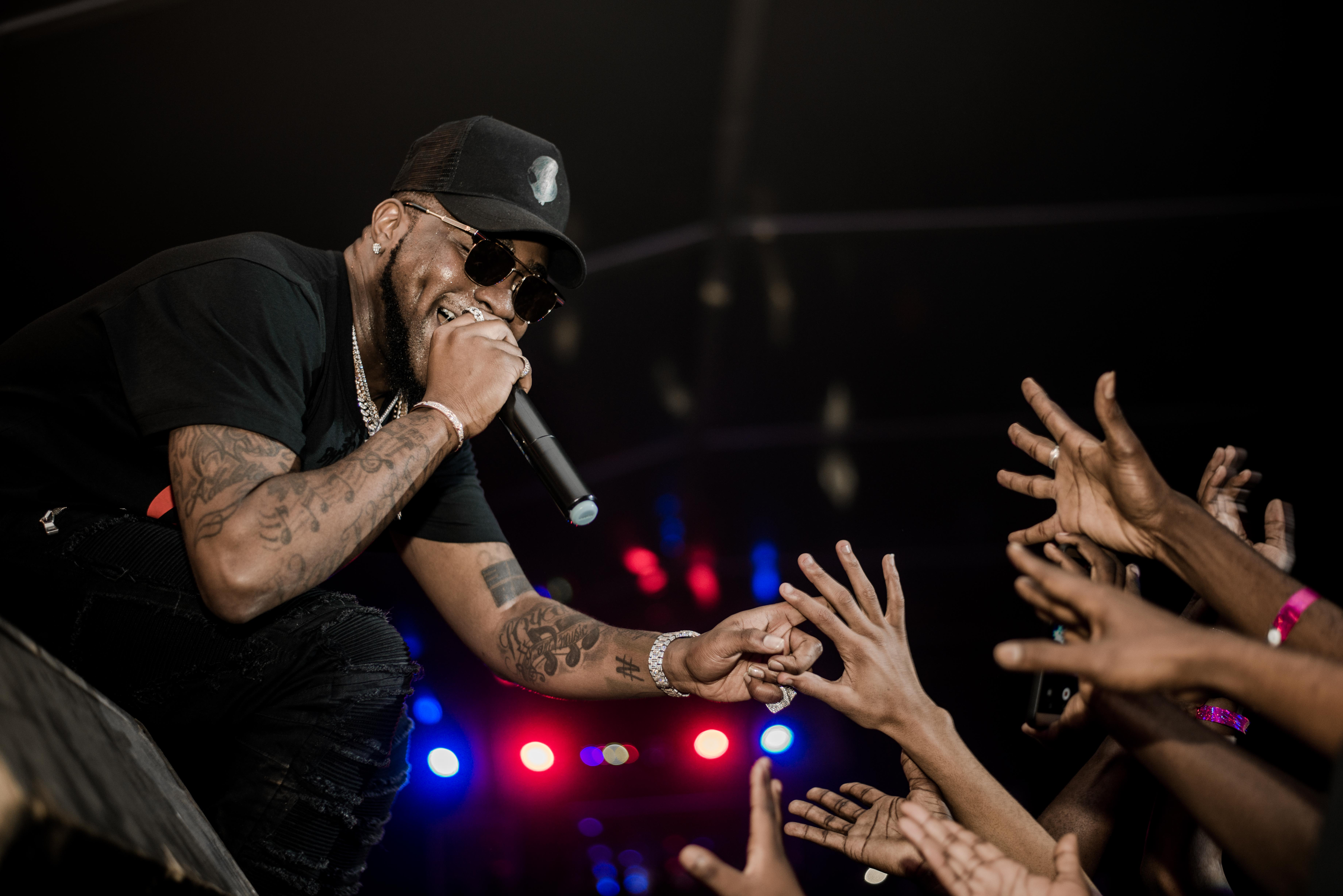
Davido performing in Tanzania

On February 25, 2013, Davido released the Shizzi-produced track "Gobe". It was ranked second on Premium Times' list of the Top 10 songs of 2013. In a review for Vanguard newspaper, Charles Mgbolu said the song "exudes fun from start to finish". Godfather Productions recorded the song's music video in South Africa. Davido announced on Twitter "One of a Kind" would be released on May 13, 2013. Shizzl also produced the song. Tebza of Godfather Productions recorded and directed the song's music video in South Africa; it depicts a united Africa that is rich in culture and music.

"Skelewu" was released on August 13, 2013. It was ranked fifth on Premium Times' list of the top 10 songs of 2013. On August 18, 2013, Davido promoted "Skelewu" by uploading an instructional dance video to YouTube; the release was accompanied by an announcement of a "Skelewu" dance competition. "Skelewu" was supported with two music videos; the first was directed by Sesan and released on October 15, 2013. It was uploaded to YouTube using a parody account. Shortly after the video's release, Davido said someone betrayed him by releasing it and that he would make another video with Moe Musa, a UK-based music video director. Sesan criticized Davido and his management for releasing inaccurate statements. Moa Musa recorded and directed the official music video for "Skelewu" in London, and it was released in October 2013.

On February 1, 2014, Davido released "Aye", which was produced by T-Spize. The song's music video was directed by Clarence Peters and released on February 7, 2014. In the video, Davido plays a poor farmer who falls in love with a prince's fiancé. Davido's collaborative single with South African duo Mafikizolo, titled "Tchelete (Goodlife)", was released on April 30, 2014. It was produced by Oskido and Shizzi, and distributed by MTN's Play and Callertunez platforms. Davido networked with Mafikizolo at MTN Nigeria's Elite Night event in December 2013. The song's music video was recorded and directed by Twenty Twenty Media. Oskido and Uhuru made cameo appearances in the video.

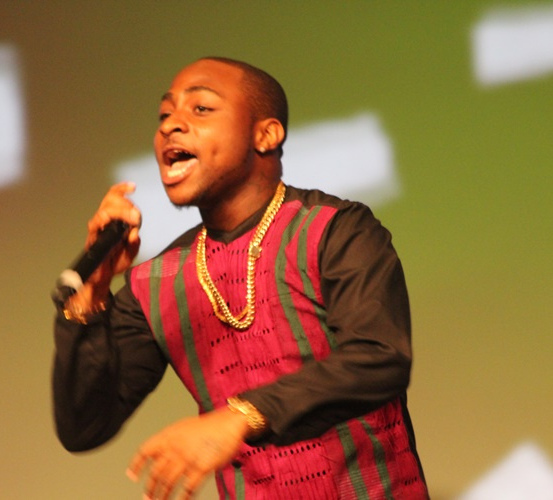
Davido at the 2014 Africa Magic Viewers Choice Awards

In June 2014, Davido collaborated with Mi Casa, Lola Rae, Sarkodie, Diamond Platnumz and Tiwa Savage on "Africa Rising", a song that was used for DStv's eponymous campaign to promote social investment projects. The song's music video was recorded and directed by South African production house Callback Dreams. The artists performed the song at the Africa Rising launch ceremony in Mauritius. In June 2015, Davido released the Meek Mill-assisted trap song "Fans Mi". Before its release, he teased fans with the audio and behind-the-scene photographs of the video.

Davido's album The Baddest was scheduled for release in June 2015 but its release was postponed to October 10 that year. Two days prior to this date, the release was again postponed because an unnamed corporation expressed an interest in distributing it. Davido had released the album's cover art and track listing earlier that year. The Baddest was planned to feature production from Shizzi, Del B, Spellz, J Fem, Don Jazzy, Puffy Tee, Uhuru, Kiddominant and Young John. It was also going to feature guest artists such as P-Square, Don Jazzy, Runtown, Uhuru, DJ Buckz, Akon, Meek Mill, Wale and Trey Songz. In January 2016, Davido announced on Twitter he signed a record deal with Sony Music; his announcement was met with mixed reactions. The record label put out a press release to confirm the deal. Davido's contract with Sony required him to release two albums, and allowed him to retain the rights to his music and performances.

A few months after signing with Sony, Davido founded the record label Davido Music Worldwide (DMW). Dremo, Mayorkun, Yonda and Peruzzi are currently signed to the label. In July 2016, Davido signed a record deal with RCA Records. His record deal with Sony Music altered plans for The Baddest's release. According to Pulse Nigeria, Davido's contract with Sony required the album to have international appeal to allow for its global distribution. In October 2016, he released the five-track EP Son of Mercy, which was supported by the singles "Gbagbe Oshi", "How Long", "Coolest Kid in Africa"; and includes guest appearances by Simi, Tinashe and Nasty C.

=== 2017–2018: "If", "Fall", "Fia" and "Assurance" ===
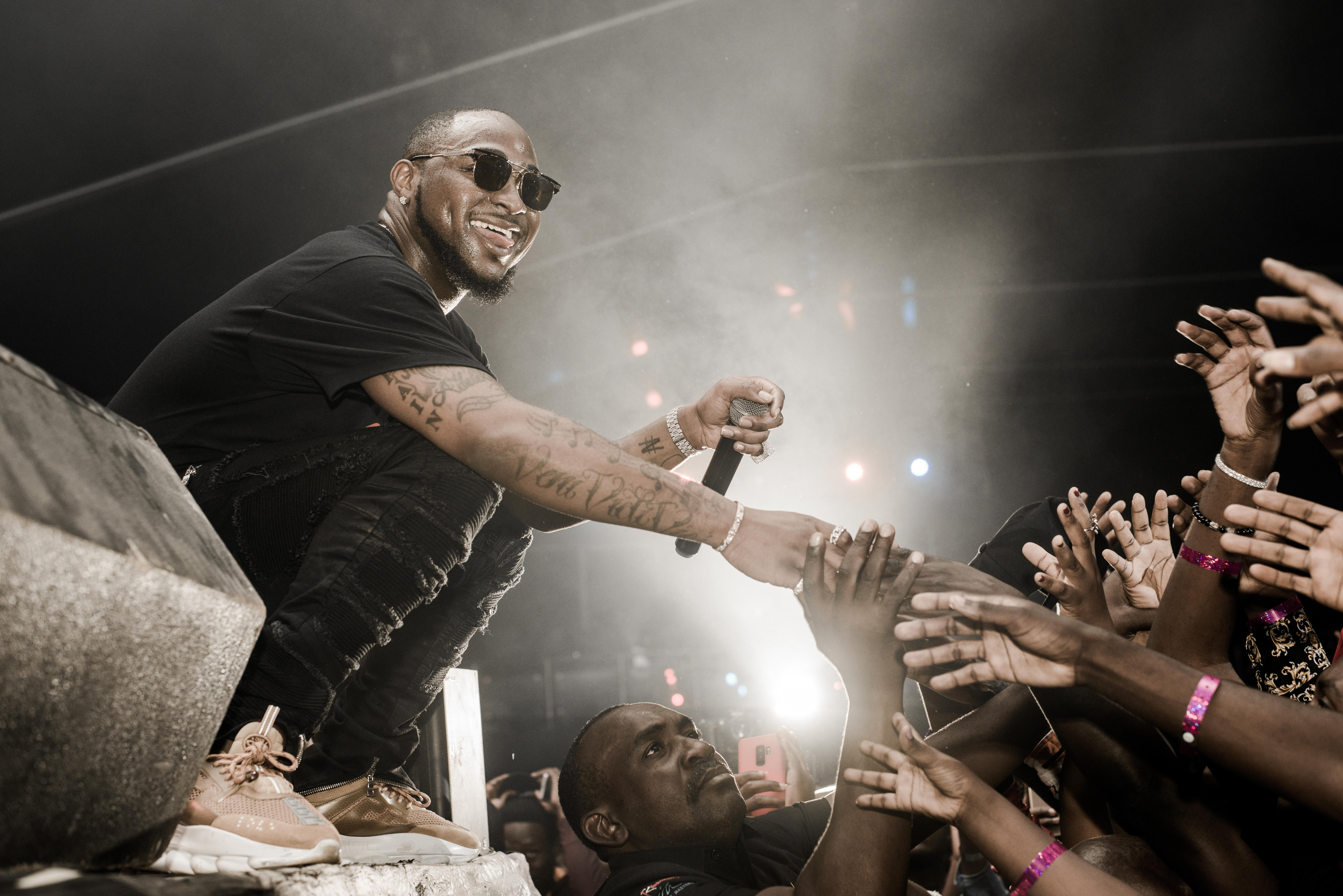
Davido interacting with fans at a 2018 concert

Davido won Best African Act at the 2017 MOBO Awards. On February 17, 2017, he released "If", which was produced by Tekno, who ghost-wrote the track for Davido. The music video for "If" has been streamed over 172 million times on YouTube, securing a place among his top-performing videos. The song was a certified diamond by the Recording Industry of South Africa (RISA), indicating shipments of 200,000 units. "If" won Best Pop Single and Song of the Year at The Headies 2018. Reviewing for OkayAfrica, Sabo Kpade described the song as a "slow burner" with an "unfussy beat that sounds hollowed out and isn't cluttered with instruments". The music video for "If" was recorded in London; it was directed by Director Q and produced by Tunde Babalola. Davido teamed up with menswear designer Orange Culture to release a capsule collection inspired by "If".

Davido released "Fall", which includes a sample of Kojo Funds's track "Dun Talking", on June 2, 2017. RISA certified "Fall" platinum; the song was one of the 100-most-Shazam-searched singles in America in January 2019, and was a top-10 record on Shazam in New York. In February 2019, it became the longest-charting Nigerian pop song in Billboard history. "Fall" was ranked at number 163 on Pitchfork's list of the 200 Best Songs of the 2010s. Nigerian-born British video director Daps directed the music video for "Fall", which in November 2023 exceeded 274 million views, becoming the most-viewed video by a Nigerian artist on YouTube.

On November 10, 2017, Davido released "Fia", which was produced by Fresh VDM and described as a neo-highlife track. In its second verse, Davido addresses his arrest and Caroline Danjuma's role in fueling a rumor he was involved in the death of Tagbo Umenike. A writer for Native magazine praised Davido's songwriting and said "Fia" "manages to reflect some of his recent personal struggles, without directly dishing into sensitive details". Reviewing for Music in Africa, Kayode Faniyi said "Fia" offers an "existential conflict" and that it is "undoubtedly the song of Davido's career—at least till he outdoes himself". Daniel Orubo of Konbini Channels described "Fia" as a "coherent" track that uses Davido's "croaky voice". "Fia" was nominated for Best Pop Single and Song of the Year at The Headies 2018. Clarence Peters the song's accompanying music video. The Stefflon Don-assisted remix of "Fia" was released on March 30, 2018. The remix retains many elements from the original recording but incorporates a patois-tinged flow. Davido won Best African Act and was one of the Best Worldwide Act recipients at the 2017 MTV Europe Music Awards. Davido released "Assurance" on April 30, 2018; he dedicated the track to his girlfriend and released it to coincide with her 23rd birthday. Reviewing for Native magazine, Toye Sokunbi said the song "speaks volumes for the importance of clarity in the age of emojis, validation from our loved ones and putting love first, against all odds". Davido won Best International Act at the 2018 BET Awards, becoming the first African artist to receive his award on the main stage. In his acceptance speech, he urged patrons and American artists to visit Africa and eat the food.

In August and September 2018, Davido performed at House of Blues in Boston as part of his "The Locked Up Tour", which commenced in August and ended in September. In September, following this tour, he performed alongside Meek Mill, Post Malone and Fat Joe at the Made in America Festival.

=== 2019: O2 Arena concert, "Blow My Mind", "Risky", and A Good Time ===
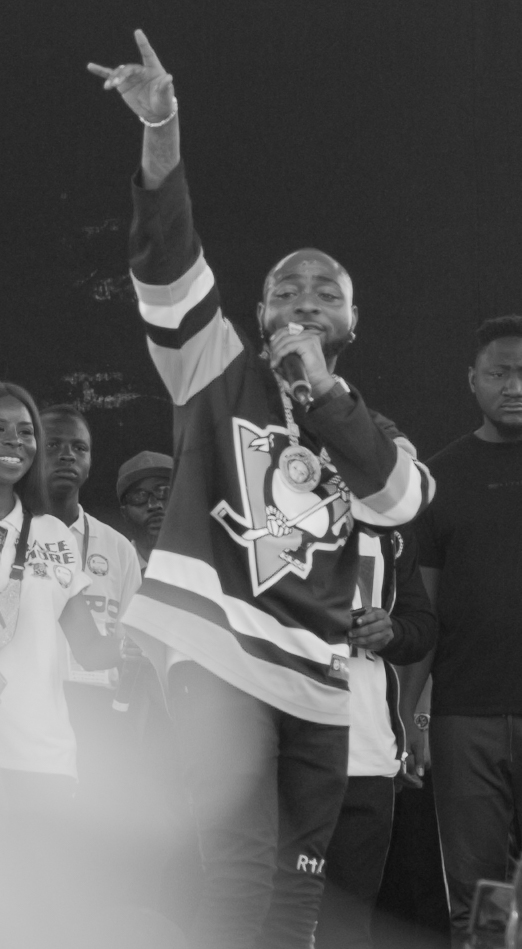
Davido performing at the Lagos city Marathon gala 2020

In January 2019, Davido sold out The O2 Arena in London, becoming the first solo African artist to do so after Wizkid in 2018. He was introduced on stage by Idris Elba and performed several of his hit singles with the backing band The Compozers. Writing for The Guardian Caroline Sullivan gave the concert four stars out of five, calling Davido an "alpha" and saying; "many of his mannerisms are influenced by the American rappers with whom he has worked, including Young Thug and Swae Lee".

The Chris Brown-assisted track "Blow My Mind" was released on July 26, 2019. It was produced by Shizzi and was initially intended to be released as the album's lead single. The song's music video amassed one million views in 11 hours, exceeding Wizkid's "Fever" and "Come Closer" to become the Nigerian music video to achieve this feat most quickly. It also became the Nigerian music video to gain the most views within the first 24 hours of its release. "Risky" was released on October 23, 2019. It features guest vocals from Jamaican singer Popcaan, who asked Davido to appear on his 2018 single "Dun Rich". The music video for "Risky" was directed by Meji Alabi and pays homage to the crime-drama television series Top Boy. In the video, a female member of Davido's and Popcaan's crew informs upon them to police.

Davido's second studio album A Good Time was released on November 22, 2019; it includes the previously released singles "If", "Fall", "Assurance", "Blow My Mind" and "Risky". Davido recorded A Good Time in Atlanta; he told Vibe magazine he wanted to record in a new environment. Davido described the album as a body of work for everybody and said it would predominantly consist of Afrobeats but would incorporate elements of other genres. Davido announced the album's title during an event held in Lagos in September 2019 and said it would be released the following month. He also unveiled excerpts of four songs from the album during the event. In July 2020, A Good Time surpassed 1 billion streams across various digital platforms.

=== 2020–2022: A Better Time and social media fundraising ===
In May 2020, Davido was featured alongside Mr Eazi and Tiwa Savage in Billboard magazine's cover story titled "Africa Now". The interview was conducted over a video conference call; the artists addressed several topics, including life under quarantine and afrobeats as a category.

On Twitter, Davido announced plans to release his third studio album A Better Time. He said he had recorded 11 tracks for the album and announced the record would feature "Tiwa Savage" and that he and everyone who worked on the album assembled the tracks in 14 days. In July 2020, Davido appeared on Tonight Show Starring Jimmy Fallon to perform a medley of his songs "D&G" and "Fall" from the album A Good Time. On August 28, 2020, the Grammy Museum announced Davido as a special guest in its Mentorship Monday series. He participated in the museum's Instagram Live event, which was held three days later. On September 10, 2020, he released the Dammy Twitch-produced single "FEM", along with its music video.

A Better Time was released on November 13, 2020. It includes guest appearances from Lil Baby, Nicki Minaj, Nas, Chris Brown, and Young Thug, among others. Davido recorded the album after canceling his 2019 North American tour as a result of the ongoing COVID-19 pandemic. On November 17, 2021, Davido asked his colleagues and fans to send him one million naira, and said those who did not send him money should no longer associate with him. He raised 200 million naira and added 50 million naira of his money, all of which he donated to orphanage homes in Nigeria.

In March 2022, Davido was featured on the single "Hayya Hayya (Better Together)", alongside American singer Trinidad Cardona and Qatari singer Aisha. The song first appeared on the compilation album FIFA World Cup Qatar 2022 Official Soundtrack (2022). In May 2022, Davido released the Pheelz-produced track "Stand Strong", which was his first solo release of the year and includes vocals by the Sunday Service Choir. In September 2022, Davido announced his first annual Are We African Yet (A.W.A.Y) music festival, which was held at the State Farm Arena in Atlanta, Georgia, on November 18, 2022, and also included performances by Kizz Daniel, Pheelz, Lojay and BNXN.

=== 2023–present: Timeless, Nine+ Records, and 5ive ===
In June 2022, Davido told Rolling Stone magazine his fourth studio album, Timeless, was nearly complete. On March 21, 2023, he announced on Instagram that the album would be released on March 31. A theatrical trailer composed of tour footage accompanied the announcement. Timeless was Davido's first album in three years. He told CNN the album's title, which record producer Don Jazzy suggested to him, is a manifestation of his goal for the album to be remembered for decades as a classic. He also told the news channel the album went through three phases before its final version. The 17-track album includes collaborations with Skepta, Angelique Kidjo, Asake, Focalistic, The Cavemen and others. Its production was handled by Magicsticks, Rage, Darmie, Blaisebeatz, 1da Banton, Caltonic SA, Young Alpha and others. Primarily an amapiano record, Timeless explores musical styles such as dancehall, ragga, konto, highlife and Afropop. The album's cover art features an image of Davido's head, two enclosed elephants, and a pathway that leads to a large hourglass. The second single from the album, "Unavailable", gained traction and charted across the United Kingdom, Switzerland, Netherlands and Suriname, where it reached the top 5. In May 2023, Davido was a recipient of the Order of the Niger, a national award in Nigeria. On August 18, 2023, he released the remix of "Unavailable", which includes a verse by American rapper Latto.

Davido received three nominations at the 66th Annual Grammy Awards, including Best Global Music Album for Timeless and Best African Music Performance for "Unavailable". In 2023, Chris Brown featured Davido and Lojay on his single "Sensational", which was released as the second single from his eleventh studio album 11:11. The song debuted at number 96 on the US Billboard Hot 100, serving as Davido and Lojay's first entry on the chart. In January 2024, Davido received three nominations at the 55th NAACP Image Awards. In April 2024, he established his record company, Nine+ Records, in collaboration with UnitedMasters. In December 2024, Davido told Rolling Stone magazine that his fifth studio album, 5ive, would be released in March 2025. The album ended up being released on 18 April and has 17 tracks. It features collaborations with YG Marley, Chris Brown, Odumodublvck, Chike, Victoria Monét, Shenseea, Musa Keys, Victony, Becky G, and Omah Lay, among others. 5ive was supported by the several singles, including "Awuke", "Funds", and "Be There Still".

== Artistry ==
Davido attributes his passion for music to his mother, and grew up listening to rappers Ja Rule and 50 Cent. According to Flaunt magazine, his artistry spans the divide between Afrobeats, hip hop and R&B. In an interview with Numéro, Davido said he was a member of a hip-hop ensemble before switching to R&B and then Afrobeats. According to The New York Times writer Jon Pareles, Davido's music has focused on whimsical subjects like romance, ambition, and optimistic thinking. Despite being criticized for having a "hazy and husky voice", Emmanuel Daraloye commended Davido's vocal performance on Timeless. In particular, Daraloye gave him credit for going "toe-to-toe" with Fave on "Kante" and contributing a "laid-back lower register" on the song "For the Road".

== Other ventures ==
On April 6, 2012, Nigerian Entertainment Today reported Davido had signed a ₦30 million endorsement deal with MTN. Under the deal, Davido became the face of MTN Pulse, a marketing campaign aimed at Nigerian youth. On October 24, 2013, Pulse Nigeria reported that Guinness Nigeria had signed Davido for an endorsement deal. As part of the deal, he performed at the Guinness World of More Concert alongside artists including P-Square, D'banj, Wizkid, Ice Prince, Burna Boy, Olamide, Phyno, Chidinma, Waje and Tiwa Savage.

In May 2018, Davido signed an endorsement deal with Infinix Mobile, a Hong Kong-based smartphone manufacturer. In May 2021, he became an official brand ambassador for the sports-betting brand 1xBet. In October 2021, the cognac brand Martell announced him as its new ambassador. In December 2021, Davido signed a long-term agreement with footwear manufacturer Puma and became a global brand ambassador for the company.

== Personal life ==
Davido has fathered six children; three girls and three boys (one of whom is now deceased).

On October 31, 2022, Peoples Gazette newspaper reported the death of Davido's oldest son and third child David Ifeanyi Adeleke Jr., who drowned in a swimming pool at his father's Banana Island residence; he was three years old at the time of his death. Police questioned members of Davido's household staff. Eight domestic workers were invited to the police station for questioning after one had reported the drowning accident to the police station. Following the police investigation, six workers were released and two remained in detention.

In March 2023, Davido confirmed being married to his long-time partner, Chioma Rowland. On June 25, 2024, he held a wedding ceremony at Harbour Point in Victoria Island, Lagos. The event was attended by several prominent figures, including Olusegun Obasanjo and Babajide Sanwo-Olu. Davido was styled by Deangelictouchstylist, Lucky Enemuo, and Ugo Monye.

Davido was appointed an Officer of the Order of the Niger (OON) in May 2023.

== Discography ==
Studio albums

- Omo Baba Olowo (2012)
- A Good Time (2019)
- A Better Time (2020)
- Timeless (2023)
- 5ive (2025)
- Oriadé (2026)

== Tours ==
- Davido UK Tour (with The Compozers) (2019)
- A Good Time North America Tour (2019–2020)
- WRBLO Tour (2022)
- Timeless North America Tour (2023)
- 5ive Alive Tour (2025)

== See also ==
- List of awards and nominations received by Davido
- List of Yoruba people
- List of Nigerian musicians

Awards and achievements
Preceded by Wizkid (2011)	Next Rated Award; 2012	Succeeded by Sean Tizzle (2013)
