= Davido Music Worldwide =

Record label in Nigeria

- Type: Private
- Industry: Music; Entertainment
- Genre: Various
- Founded: 2016 April 18; 10 years ago
- Founder: David Adedeji Adeleke
- Headquarters: Lekki, Lagos, Nigeria
- Area served: Worldwide
- Key people: David Adeleke (Chairman); Sir Banko (CEO); Bobo Ajudua (Head of Business)
- Products: Music
- Website: http://dmwhq.com

Davido Music Worldwide (commonly known as DMW) is a Nigerian record label owned by Afrobeats singer and songwriter Davido. The label is home to singers Morravey Logos Olori, and Boi Chase; producers Fresh VDM and Speroach Beatz are also signed to the label. Artists formerly signed to the label include Ichaba, Lola Rae, Lil Frosh, Dremo, Yonda, Peruzzi, Idowest, DJ Ecool, Danagog, B-Red, Deekay, May D, Deinde, Ayanfe, Liya, and Mayorkun.

In 2020, Billboard Magazine named DMW as one of the gatekeepers of the Nigerian music industry.

== History ==
On 18 April 2016, Davido founded Davido Music Worldwide, following his exit from HKN Music with his music acts Mayorkun, and Dremo over an issue with his cousin B-Red, for hating on him over the success of Mayorkun. On 29 September 2016, Ichaba signed a joint venture between Davido Music Worldwide, and APPE Music Entertainment. On 5 November 2016, Davido signed Lola Rae to DMW, as its first lady. On 20 January 2017, Davido signed Yonda, and also welcomed Peruzzi on 16 November 2017 to DMW. On 24 May 2018, Davido signed Idowest to DMW, and Deekay was welcomed on 27 September 2018, with a single "Hangover" featuring Peruzzi. On 26 October 2019, Davido signed Lil Frosh to DMW. On 15 January 2020, Davido signed Ayanfe to DMW, and Davido welcomed B-Red on 22 February 2020 to DMW. On 18 July 2020, Davido signed May D to DMW. On 27 September 2020, Deinde joined DMW artist roaster, following his deal with DMW. On 2 October 2020, Davido signed Liya, his first female artist to DMW. Same day, Lola Rae, tweeted "Excited to hear Davido is signing a new female artist!!! This is amazing amazing news! I was never signed to Davido; he was just incredibly kind enough to help push & promote an upcoming artist aka myself! God bless him forever for that so grateful".

In 2018, DJ Ecool, who also serves as Davido official disc jockey, became a member of DMW. In March 2023, Davido announced the signings of Logos Olori and Morravey to DMW, and made a change to the label's logo. On 29 March 2025, Davido signed Boi Chase.

== Departures ==
=== Ichaba ===
On 1 November 2019, he uncovered his record deal with DMW, according to him on Catch Up, he tells City 105.1 FM, "I was about to get signed to them at some point but, there were some little distractions on my end. Presently it just like I’m signed because I get all the perks of a signed artist. I don’t have plans to get signed to another record label".

=== Lola Rae ===
On 2 October 2020, Lola Rae, tweeted she was never signed to DMW, but she is forever grateful to Davido.

=== Lil Frosh and allegations of domestic violence ===
On 6 October 2020, Davido terminated Lil Frosh contract with DMW, over an allegations of domestic violence by his girlfriend Gift Camille, which went viral on Monday, 5 October.

=== Mayorkun ===
In 2021, Mayorkun announced his exit from DMW with the release of his single "Let Me Know" off his second album "Back In Office", released through Sony Music West Africa. At the album launch of Back In Office, Davido made it public as he gave a speech at the event.

=== Liya ===
On 19 July 2023, Liya replied to a fan on her Instagram comment section, confirming she was no longer with the label.

== Accolades ==
DMW won Record Label of the Year at The Beatz Awards 2019, and City People Music Awards 2017/2018, and was nominated at City People Music Awards 2016.

Year	Awards ceremony	Award description(s)	Results
2016	City People Music Awards	Record Label of the Year	Nominated
2017	City People Music Awards	Record Label of the Year	Won
2018	City People Music Awards	Record Label of the Year	Won
2019	The Beatz Awards	Record Label of the Year	Won

== Roster ==
=== Current acts ===
Act	Year signed	Releases under the label
Davido	2016	4
Yonda	2017	1
Peruzzi	2017	3
Idowest	2018	2
DJ Ecool	2018	1
Danagog	2018	1
B-Red	2020	1
Deekay	2020	—
Deinde	2020	—
May D	2020	1
Ayanfe	2020	1
Morravey	2023	1
Logos Olori	2023	—
SAYTHEYCALLMESG	2024	1

=== Former acts ===
Act	Year signed	Year left	Releases under the label
Ichaba	2016		—
Dremo	2016	2022	
Lola Rae	2016		—
Lil Frosh	2019	2020	—
Mayorkun	2016	2021	2
Liya	2020	2023	1

=== Producers ===
- Speroach Beatz
- Napji
- Magicboi
- Fresh VDM

=== DJ's ===
DJ Ecool

== Discography ==
=== Albums/Mixtape/EP ===
Artist	Album	Details
Davido	Son of Mercy (EP)	Released: 21 October 2016; Chart Position: 4; Certification: —
Davido	A Good Time	Released: 22 November 2019; Chart Position: 40; Certification: —
Davido	A Better Time	Released: 13 November 2020; Chart Position: 4; Certification: —
Davido	Timeless	Released: 31 March 2023; Chart Position: Certification: —
Mayorkun	The Mayor of Lagos	Released: 16 November 2018; Chart Position: 15; Certification: —
Mayorkun	Geng (EP)	Released: 10 April 2020; Chart Position: Certification: —
Dremo	Codename, Vol. 1	Released: 20 July 2018; Chart Position: Certification: —
Dremo	Icen B4 the Cake (EP)	Released: 26 August 2019; Chart Position: Certification: —
Dremo	Codename, Vol. 2	Released: 17 April 2020; Chart Position: Certification: —
Yonda	Wild Blue	Released: 11 December 2020; Chart Position: Certification: —
Peruzzi	Heartwork	Released: 21 December 2018; Chart Position: Certification: —
Peruzzi	Huncho Vibez	Released: 8 November 2019; Chart Position: Certification: —
Peruzzi	Rum & Boogie	Released: 9 April 2021; Chart Position: Certification: —
Idowest	Mafia Culture, Vol. 1	Released: 29 March 2019; Chart Position: Certification: —
Idowest	Mafia Culture, Vol 2	Released: 8 March 2021; Chart Position: Certification: —
DJ Ecool	NewSide (EP)	Released: 13 March 2020; Chart Position: Certification: —
B-Red	The Jordan Album	Released: 8 October 2020; Chart Position: Certification: —
Liya	Alari (EP)	Released: 20 August 2021; Chart Position: Certification: —
