= Nasty C discography =

- Studio albums: 5
- EPs: 4
- Singles: 41
- Music videos: 26
- Mixtapes: 4

South African rapper Nasty C has released five studio albums, four extended plays (EPs), 41 singles and 26 music videos (including twenty six as a featured artist). Nasty C's music has been released on record labels Venomous Production, Outy Records, Free World Music, Mabala Noise Entertainment and Universal Music. He gained major attention after the release of his second mixtape Price City, which was released in 2015. He won the Best Freshman Award at the 2015 South African Hip Hop Awards for Price City at the age of 18, making him the youngest recipient for the award.

Nasty C's debut album Bad Hair, was released 23 September 2016 on Audiomack for streaming and free digital download and on iTunes 24 September 2016. It features guest appearances from Omari Hardwick, Riky Rick, Tshego, Tellaman, Erick Rush and Rowlene. Bad Hair was preceded by one single, "Hell Naw", which won Song Of The Year at the 23rd annual South African Music Awards, which took place 27 May 2017. On 2 December 2016, Nasty C released Bad Hair Extensions, an extended version of his debut album Bad Hair. It features 4 new songs and a guest appearance from American hip hop recording artist, French Montana.

On 6 July 2018, Nasty C released his second studio album Strings And Bling, which was issued on major record label Universal Music Group South Africa. The album's release was preceded by four singles "Jungle", "King", "Legendary" and "SMA", which features the singer and first Tall Racks Signee, Rowlene. Strings And Bling features other guest appearances like the American rapper A$AP Ferg and Kaien Cruz. Nasty C surprise-released the single "God Flow" featuring crownedYung, produced by Select Play's Lastee and Tellaman on 27 September 2019. Nasty C's third studio album, Zulu Man with Some Power, was released on 28 August 2020. In September 2022, Nasty C released his fifth mixtape titled "Ivyson Army Tour Mixtape", dedicating the project to all his fans who attended the Ivyson Army Tour, prior to the mixtape's release.

Building on the events following the Ivyson Army Tour Mixtape in September 2022, Nasty C entered a prolific era marked by major collaborations and a return to independence. In early 2023, he released the singles "No More" and "Crazy Crazy" before embarking on the massive African Throne World Tour with Cassper Nyovest, which visited over 10 countries across Africa between August and October 2023. During this tour, on September 15, 2023, he released his fourth studio album, I Love It Here, which debuted at number one in South Africa and featured personal themes of fatherhood and authenticity

In 2024, Nasty C expanded his discography with several shorter projects and a European tour. He released the Ivyson Pack in April followed by the single "See Me Now (Remix)". In October 2024, he collaborated with Lekaa Beats for the EP "Confuse the Enemy", which was later expanded into "Confuse The Enemy (Reloaded)" in November. Simultaneously, he launched the I Love It Here Tour in Europe, performing in cities such as Paris, London, and Berlin throughout October 2024

By 2025, Nasty C announced his transition to independence under his own label, Tall Racks, after leaving Def Jam. He preceded his next major project with the 2025 singles "Psychic" in May, "Soft" in June, and "Leftie (Dlala Ngcobo)" in August. His fifth studio album, Free, was released on September 12, 2025, and achieved significant global success as an independent release, reaching number one on Apple Music in multiple countries. To close out the year, he launched the Ivyson Tour Africa, a multi-city circuit that included a major homecoming performance in Durban on December 16, 2025, and a scheduled appearance

== Albums ==
=== Studio albums ===
List of studio albums, with selected chart positions and certifications
Title	Album details	Peak chart positions		Certifications
Title	Album details	SA	TurnTable	Certifications
Bad Hair	Released: 23 September 2016; Label: Mabala Noise Entertainment; Formats: CD, Digital download	3		RISA : Platinum
Strings And Bling	Released: 6 July 2018; Label: Universal Music South Africa; Formats: CD, Digital download	1		RISA: 3× Platinum
Zulu Man with Some Power	Released: 28 August 2020; Label: Universal Music South Africa, Def Jam; Formats: Digital download	1		RISA: Platinum
I Love It Here	Released: 15 September 2023; Label: Universal Music South Africa, Def Jam; Formats: Digital download, Streaming	1		RISA: Gold
Free	Released: 12 September 2025; Label: Tall Racks Records; Formats: Digital download, Streaming	1	62	

=== Mixtapes ===
List of mixtapes with selected details
Title	Album details
One Kid a Thousand Coffins	Released: 25 May 2013; Label: Venomous Production; Formats: Digital download
Price City	Released: 10 February 2015; Label: Free World Music; Formats: Digital download
Zulu	Released: 25 June 2020; Label: Def Jam Recordings, Universal Music South Africa; Formats: Digital download, Cassette, CD
Ivyson Army Tour Mixtape	Released: 16 September 2022; Label: Def Jam Recordings, Universal Music South Africa; Formats:Digital download

== EPs ==
List of extended plays, with selected details
Title	Details
C L.A.M.E	Released: 4 April 2014; Label: Outy Records; Formats: Digital download
Lost Files	Released: 17 April 2020; Label: Tall Racks Records; Formats: Digital Download, streaming
Confuse the Enemy	Released: 17 October 2024; Label: Tall Racks Records; Formats: Digital Download, Streaming
Confuse the Enemy	Released: 22 November 2024; Label: Tall Racks Records; Formats: Digital Download, Streaming

== Singles ==
=== As lead artist ===
List of singles as lead artist, with selected chart positions and certifications, showing year released and album name
Title	Year	Peak chart positions	Certifications	Album
Title	Year	SA	Certifications	Album
"Juice Back"	2015	9		Price City
"Hell Naw"	2016	4		Bad Hair
"UNO"	2016	—		Non-album singles
"Switched Up"	2016	—		Non-album singles
"Belong" (with Buffalo Souljah)	2016	—		Non-album singles
"Pressure"	2016	—		Bad Hair
"Uok"	2016	13		Bad Hair Extensions
"NDA"	2017			Non-album singles
"Mad Over You (Cover)"				Non-album singles
"031"				Non-album singles
"Allow" (featuring French Montana)				Bad Hair Extensions
"Said" (with Runtown)				Non-album singles
"?Question" (featuring Shekhinah)				Non-album singles
"Changed"				Non-album singles
"King" (featuring A$AP Ferg)	2018	—		Strings and Bling
"Jungle"	2018	—		Strings and Bling
"Legendary"	2018	—		Strings and Bling
"Wuz Dat" (with Boity)	2018	—		Non-album single
"Gravy"	2019	—		Strings and Bling
"SMA" (featuring Rowlene)	2019	1	3× Platinum	Strings and Bling
"Strings and Bling"	2019	—		Strings and Bling
"There They Go"	2019	—		Zulu Man with Some Power
"Ngyazama (Acapella Zulu freestyle)"	2019	—		Non-album singles
"God Flow" (featuring crownedYung)	2019	—		Non-album singles
"UNO (C-mix)"	2019	—		Non-album singles
"I Need You"(featuring Rowlene)	2020	—		Blood & Water Soundtrack
"They Don't" (with T.I.)	2020	—		Zulu Man with Some Power
"Eazy"	2020	—		Zulu Man with Some Power
"Palm Trees"	2020	—		Zulu Man with Some Power
"Best I Ever Had"	2021	3		Non-album singles
"Jack"	2021	—		Non-album singles
"Stalling"	2022	8		Non-album singles
"Can't Imagine"	2022	6		Non-album singles
"No Big Deal"	2022	—		Non-album singles
"Lemons (Lemonade)" (with AKA)	2022	2	RiSA: 5× Platinum	Mass Country
"Too Much" (K.O, Nasty C)	2024	10		Non-album single
"No More"	2024			I Love It Here
"Crazy Crazy"	2024			I Love It Here
"See Me Now (Remix)"	2024			-
"Psychic"	2025			Free
"Soft (with Usimamane)"	2025			Free
"Leftie (Dlala Ngcobo) (with Blxckie)	2025			Free
"—" denotes a recording that did not chart or was not released in that territory.

=== As featured artist ===
List of singles as featured artist, with selected chart positions and certifications, showing year released and album name
Title	Year	Peak chart positions			Certifications	Album
Title	Year	SA	UK	US	Certifications	Album
"Way It Go" (DJ Switch featuring Stogie T, Youngsta and Nasty C)	2015	—	—	—		Non-album single
"Jump" (Anatii and Cassper Nyovest featuring Nasty C)	2016	4	—	—		Artiifact
"Noma Kanjan" (Tellaman featuring Nasty C)	2016	—	—	—		Non-album singles
"Ubusha Bethu" (DJ Wobbly featuring Dreamteam and Nasty C)	2016	—	—	—		Non-album singles
"Tell Em Say " (Tshego featuring Cassper Nyovest, Nasty C and Gemini Major)	2016	—	—	—		Non-album singles
"Day Off" (Stilo Magolide featuring Nasty C)	2016	—	—	—		Non-album singles
"So High" (Tshego featuring Nasty C)	2016	—	—	—		Non-album singles
"Feelin Lit" (Quikk Billion featuring Nasty C)	2016	—	—	—		Non-album singles
"Connect" (Ms. Cosmo featuring Nasty C, Rouge and Kwesta)	2017	—	—	—		Non-album singles
"NDA" (The Vinyl Kid featuring Nasty C)	2017	—	—	—		Non-album singles
"Errday" (Ill Chapter featuring Nasty C)	2017	—	—	—		Non-album singles
"Dan Larusso" (Golden Black featuring Nasty C)	2018	—	—	—		Non-album singles
"Take My Time" (Lastee featuring Nasty C and Tellaman)	2018	—	—	—		Non-album singles
"SAP" (Tellaman featuring Nasty C and Da L.E.S)	2018	—	—	—		Non-album singles
"Money Machine" (Tshego featuring Nasty C and Nadia Nakai)	2018	—	—	—		Non-album singles
"Like a Bad Girl" (Pappy Thrill featuring Nasty C)	2018	—	—	—		Non-album singles
"143" (Rowlene featuring Nasty C)	2018	—	—	—		Non-album singles
"Audemars" (Mishlawi featuring Nasty C)	2019	—	—	—		Non-album singles
"Whipped" (Tellaman featuring Shekhinah and Nasty C)	2019	—	—	—		Non-album singles
"Right Now" (Gemini Major featuring Nasty C and Tellaman)	2019	—	—	—		Non-album singles
"Wacko" (King98 featuring Nasty C and Laylizzy)	2019	—	—	—		Non-album singles
"Paris" (Shane Eagle featuring Nasty C)	2019	—	—	—		Dark Moon Flower
"Chotanoshi" (JP The Wavy featuring Nasty C)	2019	—	—	—		Life Is Wavy
"40 Days 40 Nights" (Dax featuring Nasty C)	2021	—strings and bling	—	—		Pain Paints Paintings
"Why me" (Audiomaric featuring Nasty C and Blxckie)	2021					
"Friends" (Domani featuring Nasty C)	2021	—	—	—		Non-album single
"We Run the World" (Big Zulu featuring Nasty C and Patoranking)	2022					Non-album single
"—" denotes a recording that did not chart or was not released in that territory.

== Guest appearances ==
List of non-single guest appearances, with other performing artists, showing year released and album name
Title	Year	Other artist(s)	Album
"I Want It All"	2015	DJ Speedsta, Shane Eagle	The Guy: Episode 1 - Season 23
"Winning"	2015	Emtee	Avery
"Clean Stuff"	2016	Stogie T	Stogie T
"Coolest Kid in Africa"	2016	Davido	Son of Mercy
"Particula"	2017	Major Lazer, DJ Maphorisa, Ice Prince, Patoranking, Jidenna	Know No Better
"express"	2018	Odunsi (The Engine), Santi	rare.
"Colorful"	2021	Ai, Motohiro Hata, Little Glee Monster, Daichi Miura, Perfume, Taemin (Shinee), Miyavi, Sabrina Carpenter, Ayumu Imazu, Blue Vintage, Mizki, Sanari, Chikuzen Sato (Sing Like Talking)	—N/a
"Biggest Drippa"	2022	JP the Wavy & Bankroll Got It, Awich	Bankroll Wavy

== Music videos ==
=== As lead artist ===
List of music videos as lead artist, showing year released and directors
Title	Year	Director(s)
"Juice Back"	2015	Nasty C
"Juice Back (Remix)" (featuring Davido & Cassper Nyovest)	2016	Sesan
"Bamm Bamm"	2016	PhotoShootPwesh
"Hell Naw"	2016	Teddy Maxx, Nasty C
"Switched Up"	2016	Teddy Maxx, Nani Chehore
"Pressure"	2017	Spha, Nasty C
"NDA"	2017	Nani Chehore
"Phases" (featuring Rowlene)	2017	Kyle Lewis
"Dont Do It" (featuring Tellaman)	2017	Kyle Lewis
"Good Girls And Snapchat Hoes"	2017	Kyle Lewis
"Allow" (featuring French Montana)	2017	Matt Alonzo
"Said" (with Runtown)	2017	Justin Campos
"Jungle"	2018	Meji Alabi
"King" (featuring A$AP Ferg)	2018	Meji Alabi
"There They Go"	2020	Andrew Sandler
"Bookoo Bucks"	2020	Lil Keed, Lil Gotit

=== As featured artist ===
List of music videos as featured artist, showing year released and directors
Title	Year	Director(s)
"Way It Go" (DJ Switch featuring Tumi, Youngsta and Nasty C)	2015	
"Like a Bad Girl" (Pappy Thrill featuring Nasty C)	2016	Tinashe Arthur Chikwanda
"Jump" (Anatii and Cassper Nyovest featuring Nasty C)	2016	Kyle Lewis
"Day Off" (Stilo Magolide featuring Nasty C)	2016	Studio Space
"Coolest Kid in Africa" (Davido featuring Nasty C)	2016	Sesan
"Connect" (Ms. Cosmo featuring Nasty C, Rouge and Kwesta)	2017	Nani Chehore
"S.A.P" (Tellaman featuring Nasty C and Da L.E.S)	2017	Nani Chehore
"Particula" (Major Lazer featuring Nasty C, DJ Maphorisa, Ice Prince, Patoranking and Jidenna)	2017	Adriaan Louw
"40 Days 40 Nights" (Dax featuring Nasty C)	2021	Logan Meis Aser Santos Jr.
