= Rhythms of Zamunda =

Soundtrack album by Various artists
- Released: March 5, 2021
- Recorded: 2020
- Studio: Def Jam Africa Recording Studio
- Genre: Afrobeats; R&B; hip hop; Pop; Amapiano; House music; Funk; Highlife; Afro-Pop; Dance Hall
- Label: Def Jam Recordings Africa
- Producer: Sipho Dlamini (exec.); Colin Gayle; Nasty C; Kevin Ross; J-Kits; Richie Tunez; Phantom; Lastee; Tellaman; Select Play; TMXO; Prince Kaybee; De Mogul SA; DJ Ganyani; Th&o.; Lizer Classic; TRESOR; Clement Leslie James Carr; Rudolph Wilemse; Hubert Batundi Muisha; Gemini Major; Masterkraft; De Mthuda; Playground Productions

Singles from Rhythms of Zamunda
- 1. "White and Black"

Rhythms of Zamunda, released as Rhythms of Zamunda (Music Inspired by the Amazon Original Movie: Coming 2 America), is a soundtrack album curated by Sipho Dlamini for the film Coming 2 America. It was released on March 5, 2021, by Def Jam Recordings and Def Jam Africa for Paramount Pictures. The album features Pan-African artists such as Nasty C, Larry Gaaga, Umu Obiligbo, Locko, Tekno, Tellaman, Sha Sha, Oxlade, Alpha P, TMXO, DJ Arafat, Prince Kaybee, Msaki, Tiwa Savage, Th&o., Diamond Platnumz, Morgan Heritage, Toofan, Fally Ipupa, BONJ, Gemini Major, Anatii, De Mthuda, Njelic, and Ricky Tyler, as well as appearances from Ari Lennox.

== Background ==
On February 12, 2021, Def Jam revealed the CEO of Universal Music South Africa, Sipho Dlamini, as the curator and executive producer of Rhythms of Zamunda. The Pan-African project was inspired by the film, with lead single "Black and White" by Nasty C and Ari Lennox. On March 10, 2021, National Public Radio released a Tiny Desk show, titled Coming 2 America, Sounds Of Zamunda: Tiny Desk (Home) Concert, a live performance from Nasty C, Lennox, Locko, Ricky Tyler, Alpha P, Prince Kaybee, Msaki, and Toofan.

The tracklist was revealed through Def Jam's official website on February 12, 2021.

== Composition ==
In February 2021, Sipho Dlamini said, "We wanted to bring our knowledge of the music from the continent that is coming up and affecting the youth globally — it's not just Afrobeats. Much like the movie is about America on one side and Africa, we could draw on the African genres you would expect but you also have R&B, hip-hop, house and so forth. 'Black and White' is a great example. It sounds like it could have been made in a studio in the U.S., and it's a collaboration with an American artist, but Nasty C is as African as it gets."

== Accolades ==
Award nominations for Rhythms of Zamunda
Award	Nominated Work	Category	Result
26th South African Music Awards	"Shesha"	Record of the Year	Nominated

== Track listing ==
Rhythms of Zamunda – standard edition
No.	Title	Writer(s)	Producer(s)	Length
1.	"Black and White" (Nasty C and Ari Lennox)	Nsikayesizwe David Junior Ngcobo; Courtney Shanade Salter	Colin Gayle; Sipho Dlamini; Nasty C; Kevin Ross; J-Kits	3:37
2.	"Owo Ni Koko" (Larry Gaaga, and Umu Obiligbo)	Larry Ndianefo; Umu Obiligbo	Richie Tunez	4:38
3.	"Magnet" (Locko)	Locko		3:30
4.	"Skeletun" (Tekno)	Augustine Miles Kelechi	Phantom	3:12
5.	"Overdue" (Tellaman featuring Sha Sha and Oxlade)	Thelumusa Samuel Owen; Charmaine Shamiso Mapimbiro; Ikuforiji Olaitan Abdulrahman	Lastee; Tellaman; Select Play	3:20
6.	"Jiggy Bop" (Alpha P and TMXO)	Princewill Emmanuel; Timi Aladeloba	TMXO	3:16
7.	"Dosabado" (DJ Arafat)			2:31
8.	"Fetch Your Life (Edit)" (Prince Kaybee featuring Msaki)	Kabelo Motsamai; Asanda Lusaseni Mvana	Prince Kaybee	3:42
9.	"Dangerous Love (DJ Ganyani Amapiano Radio Edit Remix)" (Tiwa Savage)	Tiwatope Savage	De Mogul SA; DJ Ganyani	4:09
10.	"Moya Omubi" (Th&o.)	Th&o.	Th&o.	4:04
11.	"Hallelujah" (Diamond Platnumz featuring Morgan Heritage)	Nasibu Abdul Juma; Morgan Heritage	Lizer Classic	3:42
12.	"Ye Mama" (Toofan featuring Fally Ipupa)	Toofan; Fally Ipupa N'simba		3:19
13.	"Ain't It True" (BONJ)	Bongiwe Mpanza	TRESOR; Clement Leslie James Carr; Rudolph Wilemse; Hubert Batundi Muisha	3:30
14.	"Loke Loke" (Gemini Major featuring Anatii)	Benn Gilbert Kamoto; Anathi Bhongo Mnyango	Select Play; Tellaman; Lastee; Gemini Major; Masterkraft	3:33
15.	"Shesha" (De Mthuda and Njelic)	De Mthuda; Tshwarelo Motlhako	De Mthuda	6:43
16.	"Everything" (Ricky Tyler)	Bokamoso Molema	Playground Productions	3:11
