= I Love It Here =

Studio album by Nasty C
- Released: 15 September 2023
- Genre: Hip-hop
- Label: Def Jam; Universal Music South Africa
- Producer: Nasty C (also exec.); Waytoolost; Dylan Fine; Maxonproduction; Show N Prove; Christer; DJ Khalil; Tom Goss; Off & Out; Elaye Slattery; Maestro The Baker; Kurtis Mckenzie; Kid Hazel; Splited Stupid; LB808; The Elementz; Joe Reeves; Lekaa Beats; Tiggi; C. Gutta; Luke S. Crowder; JustDan; Donnie Katana; TBS; Ties; Select Play Music; Sammy Soso; Kevin Boakye; Sk8 Miles; Jeid; Holy; Serhiy Vereshchak

Nasty C chronology
Ivyson Army Tour Mixtape (2022)	I Love It Here (2023)	Free (2025)

Singles from I Love It Here
- 1. "No More" Released: June 29, 2023; 2. "Crazy Crazy" Released: July 28, 2023

I Love It Here is the fourth studio album by South African recording artist and record producer Nasty C, it was released on 15 September 2023 through Def Jam (a division of UMG) and Universal Music South Africa. It features guest appearances from Tellaman, Maglera Doe Boy, 25K, Anica, Manana, and American rapper Benny the Butcher.

It was officially submitted for consideration at the 66th Annual Grammy Awards in 2024, entering several categories including Grammy Award for Best Rap Album, Grammy Award for Best Global Music Performance, and Grammy Award for Best Music Video. Although the project successfully reached the first round of voting, it ultimately did not secure a final nomination from the Recording Academy. Despite this, the album maintained Nasty C's commercial momentum, eventually achieving Gold certification in South Africa and further solidifying his position as a leading figure in the global hip-hop scene.

== Background and promotion ==
The album features background vocals and poem from Nasty C's girlfriend and baby mama Sammie Heavens as the intro of the project.

== Track listing ==
I Love It Here track listing
No.	Title	Writer(s)	Producer(s)	Length
1.	"She's Gone & The End" (Sammie Heavens^{[a]})	Dylan Fine; Kevin Boakye; Ebenezer Maxwell; Luca Urbaniak; Mathias Thalhofer; Nsikayesizwe David Junior Ngcobo	Nasty C; Waytoolost; Dylan Fine; Maxonproduction; Kevin Boakye	3:08
2.	"Endless"	Tom Goss; Ellis Taylor; Khalil Abdul-Rahman; Christer Kobedi; Nsikayesizwe David Junior Ngcobo	Show N Prove; DJ Khalil; Christer; Tom Goss	3:00
3.	"Crazy Crazy"	Elaye Slattery; Mikael Haataje; Samuel Haataje; Nsikayesizwe David Junior Ngcobo	Off & Out; Elaye Slattery	2:32
4.	"Release Me"	Eddie Jones; Khalil Abdul-Rahman; Gerald Harris; George Kerr; Nsikayesizwe David Junior Ngcobo	DJ Khalil	2:44
5.	"Fuck That"	Khalil Abdul-Rahman; Irmin Schmidt; Jaki Liebezeit; Michael Karoli; Holger Czukay; Nsikayesizwe David Junior Ngcobo	Nasty C; DJ Khalil	2:30
6.	"Broken Mirrages" ( JStar^{[a]}; Ndumiso Manana^{[a]})	Kurtis Mckenzie; Khalil Abdul-Rahman; Ikeoluwa Oladigbolu; Ndumiso Manana; Nsikayesizwe David Junior Ngcobo	Maestro The Baker; Kurtis Mckenzie; DJ Khalil	3:01
7.	"Prosper in Peace (with Benny the Butcher)"	Ebenezer Maxwell; Ahmar Bailey; Luke Beasley; Murenets Nikita; Jeremie Pennick; Nsikayesizwe David Junior Ngcobo	Kid Hazel; Splited Stupid; LB808	3:32
8.	"Sunset Walks (featuring Tellaman)" (Sounka^{[a]})	Joe Reeves; Keven Wolfsohn; Paul Bogumil Goller; Thelumusa Samuel Owen; Nsikayesizwe David Junior Ngcobo	The Elementz; Joe Reeves	3:05
9.	"This Time (featuring Ami Faku)"	Ami Faku; Nsikayesizwe David Junior Ngcobo; Babatope Olalekan Bello	Lekaa Beats	3:09
10.	"I Love You"	Luke S. Crowder; Calvin Lamar Tarvin; Darwin C. Quinn; Nsikayesizwe David Junior Ngcobo	Tiggi; Nasty C; C. Gutta; Luke S. Crowder	3:44
11.	"No More"	Daniil Letiagin; Deonte Moore; Louis Delacour; Janko Nilovic; Nsikayesizwe David Junior Ngcobo	JustDan; Donnie Katana	3:01
12.	"RIP"	Ikeoluwa Oluwatobi Oladigbolu; Hrayr Azaryan; Nsikayesizwe David Junior Ngcobo	Nasty C; TBS; Ties	1:35
13.	"Know Yourself"	Christer Kobedi; Thelumusa Samuel Owen; Thulasizwe Dlamini; Nsikayesizwe David Junior Ngcobo	Nasty C; Christer; Select Play Music	3:48
14.	"See Me Now (featuring Manana)"	Samuel Awuku; Ndumiso Manana; James Mwanza; Cole Ostrin; Nsikayesizwe David Junior Ngcobo	Sammy Soso	2:37
15.	"Temptations (featuring Manana)"	Keven Wolfsohn; Ndumiso Manana; Nsikayesizwe David Junior Ngcobo	The Elementz	3:12
16.	"Kill the Noise (featuring Anica and Maglera Doe Boy)"	Anica De Oliveira; Tokelo Moyakhe; Miguel Alejandro Salcedo Latouche; Eric Omar Rascon Rivera; Nsikayesizwe David Junior Ngcobo	Sk8 Miles; Jeid	3:16
17.	"Pops" ( Nikki Grier^{[a]}; Jaden Grey^{[a]}; Ashly Williams^{[a]})	Thelumusa Samuel Owen; Thulasizwe Dlamini; Khalil Abdul-Rahman; Christer Kobedi; Nsikayesizwe David Junior Ngcobo	Select Play Music; Christer	3:48
18.	"Hard Choice (featuring 25K)"	Serhiy Vereshchak; Lehlohonolo Molefe; Jordan Fultan; Nsikayesizwe David Junior Ngcobo	Holy; Serhiy Vereshchak	3:43
19.	"Dear Oliver"	Keven Wolfsohn; Paul Bogumil Goller; James Mccants; Nsikayesizwe David Junior Ngcobo	The Elementz	3:17

Note

- ^{^[a]} signifies background vocals.

== Personnel ==
Credits for I Love It Here, are adapted from AllMusic.

- Nasty C - Primary Artist
- Ahmar Bailey - Composer
- Amanda Faku - Composer
- Ami Faku - Primary Artist
- Andziso Ngobeni - Guitar
- Anica De Oliveira - Composer
- Anica Kiana - Composer, Primary Artist
- Ashly Williams - Vocals (Background)
- Babatope Olalekan Bello - Composer
- Benny the Butcher - Primary Artist
- C Gutta - Producer
- Calvin Tarvin - Composer
- Christer - Composer, Producer, Programmer
- Cole Ostrin - Composer
- Daniil Letiagin - Composer
- Darwin Quinn - Composer
- Deonte Moore - Composer
- DJ Khalil - Producer, Programmer
- Donnie Katana - Producer
- Drew Corria - A&R
- Dylan Fine - Composer, Producer
- Ebenezer Maxwell - Composer, Recording
- Eddie Jones - Composer
- Elaye - Producer
- vElaye Slattery - Composer
- Ellis Taylor - Composer
- George Kerr - Composer
- Gerald Harris - Composer
- Holger Czukay - Composer
- Holy - Producer
- Hrayr Azaryan - Composer
- Ikeoluwa Tobi Oladigbolu - Composer
- Irmin Schmidt - Composer
- Jaden Gray - Vocals (Background)
- Jaki Liebezeit - Composer
- James McCants - Composer
- James Mwanza - Composer
- Janko Nilovic - Composer
- Jeidi - Producer
- Jeremie Pennick - Composer
- Joe Reeves - Composer, Producer
- Jordan Fulton - Composer
- Jstar - Vocals (Background)
- JustDan Beats - Producer
- Kevin Boakye - Composer, Producer
- Keven Wolfsohn - Composer
- Khalil Abdul-Rahman - Composer
- Kid Hazel - Producer
- Kurtis Mckenzie - Composer, Drums, Producer
- Lb808 - Producer
- Lehlohonolo Molefe - Composer
- Lekaa Beats - Producer
- Liza Corsey - A&R
- Louis Delacour - Composer
- Luca Urbaniak - Composer
- Luke Beasley gComposer
- Luke Crowder - Composer, Producer
- Maestro The Baker - Producer
- Maglera Doe Boy - Primary Artist
- Mathias Thalhofer - Composer
- Matti Mikael Haataja - Composer
- Maxon (DE) - Producer
- Manana - Primary Artist, Composer, Vocals (Background)
- Michael Karolina - Composer
- Miguel Alejandro Salcedo Latouche - Composer
- Mike Manitshana - Mixing
- Murenets Nikita - Composer
- Nasty C - Primary Artist, Producer, Rap, Composer, Programmer, Recording
- Nikki Grier - Vocals (Background)
- Off&Out - Producer
- Omar Rivera - Composer
- Paul Bogumil Goller - Composer, Recording
- Sammie Heavens - Vocals (Background)
- Sammy Soso - Producer, Composer, Programmer
- Select Play Music - Producer
- Serhiy Vereshchak - Composer, Producer
- Show N Prove - Producer
- Simo Samuel Haataja - Composer
- Sk8miles - Producer
- Sounka - Vocals (Background)
- Splited Stupid - Producer
- Steve "B" Baughman - Mastering Engineer
- Tellaman - Primary Artist
- The Element'z - Producer
- The Muse - Violin
- Thelumusa Owen - Composer, Recording
- Thulasizwe Dlamini - Composer
- Ties - Producer
- Tiggi - Producer
- Tokelo Moyakhe - Composer
- Tom Goss - Composer, Producer
- TSB - Producer
- Waytoolost - Producer

== Promotion ==
To further promote the album, Nasty C announced his upcoming I Love it Here Tour, to commence on October 18, Paris, France.

== Accolades ==
=== Industry Awards ===
I Love it Here received two nominations for Best Produced Album, and Best Hip Hop Album at the 30th ceremony of South African Music Awards.

Awards and nominations for I Love it Here
Organization	Year	Category	Result	Ref.
South African Music Awards	2024	Best Hip Hop Album	Nominated	
South African Music Awards	2024	Best Produced Album	Nominated	

== Release history ==
List of release dates, showing region, formats, label, editions and reference
Region	Date	Format(s)	Label	Edition(s)	Ref.
Worldwide	15 September 2023	Digital download; Streaming	Def Jam	Standard	
