= Def Jam Africa =

Record label

Def Jam Recordings Africa
- Genre: Afrobeats, trap, Afro hip-hop
- Founded: 2020; 6 years ago
- Headquarters: Johannesburg, South Africa; Lagos, Nigeria
- Key people: Larry Gaaga (VP & A&R)
- Owner: Universal Music Group; Universal Music Africa
- Parent: Def Jam Recordings; Universal Music Group; Universal Music Africa
- Website: defjamafrica.com

Def Jam Recordings Africa (marketed as Def Jam Africa), is the African division of the international record label, Def Jam Recordings. The label is owned by Universal Music Africa, a flagship of Universal Music Group. Founded in 2020, and operating in South Africa, Nigeria, Côte d'Ivoire, Senegal, and Cameroon. It specializes mainly in African hip-hop, Afrobeats, and trap music.

== History ==
Def Jam Recordings Africa was founded in 2020, as the African division of Def Jam Recordings, operating in South Africa, and Nigeria. The label has a Johannesburg-based arm known as Universal Music South Africa and a Lagos-based arm known as Universal Music Group Nigeria, both headed by Sipho Dlamini, the Chief executive officer of Universal Music Sub-Saharan Africa & South Africa. The label is home to recording acts, such as Boity, Nasty C, Nadia Nakai, Larry Gaaga, Ricky Tyler, Tshego, Ténor, Tellaman, Luka Pryce, Tumi "Stogie T" Molekane, Omzo Dollar, Vector, Lucas Raps, Cassper Nyovest, Suspect 95, Asaph, and Stonebwoy.

On 13 June 2022, Larry Gaaga, the CEO and founder of Gaaga Muzik, and the former general manager of YSG Entertainment were announced as the vice president of Def Jam Africa and the head of the A&R division respectively across English-speaking markets in Africa.

== Vice presidents ==
- Larry Gaaga (2022-present)

== Artists ==
=== Current ===
African artists signed to Def Jam Africa:

*Boity Thulo
- Nadia Nakai
- Larry Gaaga
- Ricky Tyler
- Tellaman
- Luka Pryce
- Stogie T
- Suspect 95
- HIMRA
- Vector
- Omzo Dollar
- Cassper Nyovest
- Lucas Raps
- Tshego
- Cleo Ice Queen
- Ténor
- Stonebwoy
- Asaph (Zimbabwean Rapper)

=== Past ===
- Nasty C (2020-2024)

== Selected discography ==
Singles, Albums and Eps, released through Def Jam Africa:

=== Singles ===
`List of singles released by artists signed to Def Jam Africa
Artist	Title	Year	Album	Release date
Cassper Nyovest	"Good for That"	2020	A.M.N (Any Minute Now)	September 11, 2020
Cassper Nyovest	"Amademoni"	2020	A.M.N (Any Minute Now)	September 11, 2020
Nasty C, & Rowlene	"I Need You"	2020	From the Netflix Original series "Blood & Water")	May 22, 2020
Ricky Tyler	"Thirty K's"	2020	Small World	July 17, 2020
Nasty C	"Eazy"	2020	Zulu Man with Some Power	August 28, 2020
Tellaman	"Practice (Cuebur Remix)"	2020	Practice (Cuebur Remix) - Single	March 13, 2020
Tellaman	"Cross My Heart (Remix)" (featuring Alpha P)	2020	Non-album single	3 July 2020
Stonebwoy	"Therapy"	2022	5th Dimension	28 April 2023
The Kabal (mbr: 2Baba & Larry Gaaga)	"Mad Over Hills" (featuring Falz)	2022	TBA	
The Kabal (mbr: 2Baba & Larry Gaaga)	"Bebe" (featuring Mi Casa)	2023	TBA	

=== Albums & EPs ===
Incomplete list of album and ep releases for Dej Jam Recordings in Africa
Year	Title	Artist(s)	Details	Certifications
2020	Small World	Ricky Tyler	July 17, 2020	
2020	Zulu Man with Some Power	Nasty C	August 28, 2020	
2021	Rhythms of Zamunda	Various artists	March 5, 2021	
2023	5th Dimension	Stonebwoy	28 April 2023	

== See also ==
- Def Jam Recordings
