= Free (Nasty C album) =

Studio album by Nasty C
- Released: 12 September 2025
- Genre: Hip hop
- Length: 39:30
- Label: Tall Racks
- Producer: Nasty C (also exec.); MashBeatz; Stacy; Cxdy; Waytoolost; R.J Banks; Saak Beats; Spaced Time; Ebenezer Maxwell; Akhona Bereng; Ludwe Sylvester Danxa; Just Dan

Nasty C chronology
Ivyson Tour (2024)	Free (2025)

Free is the fifth studio album by South African rapper and record producer Nasty C, it was released on 12 September 2025 through Tall Racks. It features guest appearances from Blxckie, Usimamane, DJ Speedsta, Tellaman, and Tshego. The album was primarily produced by Nasty C, with additional production from MashBeatz, Stacy, Cxdy, Waytoolost, R.J Banks, Saak Beats, Spaced Time, Ebenezer Maxwell, Akhona Bereng, Ludwe Sylvester Danxa, and Just Dan.

Free has achieved remarkable commercial success as his first major independent project since leaving Def Jam Recordings. Within the first two days of its release, the album became the fastest South African hip-hop project of 2025 to surpass one million streams on Spotify, eventually reaching over 15 million streams by late October. Its global dominance was further solidified as it climbed to No. 1 on Apple Music in 12 different countries and charted in 45 countries worldwide, marking a new record for a South African hip-hop artist. This commercial surge, combined with his innovative "job experience" fan campaign and the 2025 Ivyson Tour, ensured that Nasty C remained the only rapper among Spotify's Top 10 Global South African Artists of the year.

== Background ==
Following his exit from Def Jam, with its flagship Def Jam Africa, and UMG's Universal Music Africa, Nasty C titled his album Free.

You can feel the freedom to create in the way I created the songs

— Nasty C tells Mail & Guardian,

== Critical reception ==
Professional ratings
Review scores
Source	Rating
The Native	7.3/10

Free received mixed reviews from music critics. In a review for The Native, Mayuyuka Kaunda described the album as "a capsule of lessons learned by Nasty C across his career and the growth attained in the process."

== Track listing ==
No.	Title	Length
1.	"Intro"	2:19
2.	"Leftie (Dlala Ngcobo)" (with Blxckie)	2:28
3.	"Shmokin"	1:45
4.	"Switch"	2:24
5.	"Head Up"	3:33
6.	"Soft" (with Usimamane)	2:15
7.	"That's Whassup"	2:18
8.	"10 Shooters"	1:36
9.	"Ice"	1:51
10.	"Psychic"	2:22
11.	"MSP" (featuring DJ Speedsta)	2:33
12.	"Selfish"	3:20
13.	"Big Timing" (featuring Tellaman)	3:38
14.	"Evidence"	2:29
15.	"Other Plans" (Interlude)	1:23
16.	"Not Tonight" (featuring Tshego)	3:16
Total length:		39:30

== Personnel ==
- Nasty C - primary artist, songwriting (all tracks), production (tracks ), and executive producer
- MashBeatz - production (tracks )
- Stacy - production (tracks )
- Cxdy - production (tracks )
- Waytoolost - production (tracks )
- R.J Banks - production (tracks )
- Saak Beats - production (tracks )
- Spaced Time - production (tracks )
- Ebenezer Maxwell - production (tracks )
- Akhona Bereng - production (tracks )
- Ludwe Sylvester Danxa - production (tracks )
- Just Dan - production (tracks )
- Blxckie - vocals, songwriting
- Usimamane - vocals, songwriting
- DJ Speedsta - vocals, songwriting, producer
- Tellaman - vocals, songwriting
- Tshego - vocals, songwriting

== Charts ==
Chart performance for Free
Chart (2025)	Peak position
Nigerian Albums (TurnTable)	62
South Africa (South African Albums)	1

== Release history ==
Release history and formats for Free
Region	Date	Format	Label
Various	12 September 2025	Streaming; digital download	Tall Racks
