= Rowlene =

South African singer

- Born: Rowlene Nicole Bosman; 1997 (age 28–29); South Africa
- Genres: R&B, soul, pop
- Occupations: Singer, songwriter
- Years active: 2015–present
- Label: Independent

Rowlene Nicole Bosman (born 1997), professionally known as Rowlene, is a South African singer and songwriter. She is known for her collaborations with South African rapper Nasty C.

== Early life and background ==
Rowlene Nicole Bosman was born on 3 March 1997 in Cape Town, South Africa. She grew up in a musical household and began singing in church and school settings at a young age. As a teenager, she participated in local talent competitions, which helped her gain exposure within Cape Town's music community. In interviews, Rowlene has cited artists such as Brandy as influences.

== Career ==
Rowlene began releasing music independently in the mid-2010s, sharing covers and original material online. She released "Imposter" in 2010, as part of her first recorded works. The track significantly increased her visibility in the music industry and drew the interest of former Free World Music executive Zyne Marcus. Following this exposure, she was offered a recording contract that positioned her to collaborate with established hip-hop artists including Nasty C, Erick Rush, and Tellaman.

At the age of 19, Rowlene relocated from Cape Town to Johannesburg in order to further develop her career and work more closely with the artists and industry professionals she had begun connecting with. In mid-2017, Rowlene featured A-Reece's on the song "Amen", Produced by Gobbla.

On March 15, 2019, she rose to fame with her close association with rapper Nasty C, whose tracks feature her vocals, including the songs “Phases” and, more notably, “SMA.” Rowlene was one of the first artists to join Nasty C's label, Tall Racks Records.

In 2020, Rowlene released her debut studio album, 11:11. This was promoted through singles like "Stop." Rowlene continued growing in popularity within the R&B and pop space in South Africa. The album received a South African Music Award (SAMA) nomination in the Best Pop Album category following its release. Rowlene's collaborations with Nasty C were featured in a Netflix show, Blood & Water.

On 22 November 2022, Rowlene released a single titled "Only," featuring Nigerian singer WurlD.

Rowlene released a three-pack of songs called Moment In Between, that feature the track “don’t let go” in 2024. On 14 March 2025, Rowlene released the single "Breakaway". On June 5, 2025, She released the EP Moments After. On 17 October 2025, she performed at The House of JC Le Roux.

== Discography ==
=== Studio albums ===
List of studio albums
Title	Album details	Year released
11:11	Number of Tracks: 12; Formats: LP, digital download, streaming,CD	2020

=== Extended plays ===
List of extended plays, with selected details
Title	Details
The Evolution of a Robot	Released: 2017; Formats: LP, digital download, streaming
The Evolution of a Robot 2nd Generation	Released: 2018; Formats: LP, digital download, streaming
Frequency	Released: 2022; Formats: Digital download, streaming
Santa's Baby	Released: 2025; Formats: Digital download, streaming
Moments After	Released: 2025; Formats: Digital download, streaming

=== As lead artist ===
List of singles as lead artist, with selected chart positions and certifications shown
Title	Year	Peak chart positions			Album
Title	Year	US	US R&B/HH	SA	Album
"Imposter"	2015	—	—	—	Santa's Baby
"Attitude Problems"	2017	—	—	—	Santa's Baby
"Dance With You" (featuring Riky Ricky)	2017	—	—	—	Santa's Baby
"Swang"	2017	—	—	—	Non-album singles
"Amen" (featuring A-Reece)	2017	—	—	—	Non-album singles
"Cupid"	2018	—	—	—	Non-album singles
"Only" (featuring WurlD)	2022	—	—	—	Non-album singles
"don’t let go"	2024	—	—	—	Santa's Baby
"Breakaway"	2025	—	—	—	Moments After
"—" denotes a recording that did not chart or was not released in that territory.

=== As featured artist ===
List of singles as featured artist, showing year released and album name
Title	Year	Peak chart positions	Certifications	Album
Title	Year	SA	Certifications	Album
"Don’t Play With My Love"(D-Jah Leenx featuring Rowlene)	2015	—		Non-album single
"Phases"	2016	—		Bad Hair
"SMA" (Nasty C featuring Rowlene)	2019	1	3× Platinum	Strings and Bling
"Ecstacy" (Ricky Tyler featuring Rowlene with Shellsy Baronet)	2017	—		Non-album singles
"About You" (with Skatta & Masandi)	2017	—		Non-album singles
"Between Me and You" (Flame featuring Rowlene )	2017	—		Non-album singles
"Pride" (A-Reece featuring Rowlene )	2017	—		Non-album singles
"On Some" (DJ Killamo featuring Rowlene with Lastee & Tellaman )	2017	—		Non-album singles
"Ghost" (DJ Wobbly featuring Rowlene with Lastee & Tellaman )	2018	—		Non-album singles
"Give Me Something" (Sha Sha featuring Rowlene )	2022	—		Non-album singles

=== Film score ===
List of film scores
Title	Album details	Year released
i Need You (with Nasty C)	Blood & Water	2020

== Awards and nominations ==
Year	Event	Category	Result
2020	South African Music Award (SAMA)	Best Pop Album	Nominated
