= Zulu Man with Some Power =

Studio album by Nasty C
- Released: 28 August 2020
- Length: 58:44
- Label: Def Jam; Universal Music South Africa
- Producer: Nasty C; ATL Jacob; Audiomarc; Bankroll Got It; Beat Butcha; Beatsbydil; Blasian Beats; Colin Gayle; Cxdy; Darrius Willrich; GC; Gemini Major; G Koop; Impala Drummerz; Jake One; J-Kits; Kevin Ross; Nani; Pluss; Sam Wish; Select Play; Sipho Dlamini; Spacedtime Beats; Tantu Beats; ZinoD; Zino de Klerk

Nasty C chronology
Strings and Bling (2018)	Zulu Man with Some Power (2020)	Ivyson Army Tour Mixtape (2022)

Singles from Zulu Man with Some Power
- 1. "There They Go" Released: 27 March 2020; 2. "They Don't" Released: 6 June 2020; 3. "Eazy" Released: 12 June 2020; 4. "Palm Trees" Released: 6 August 2020; 5. "Black and White" Released: 12 February 2021

Zulu Man with Some Power is the third studio album by South African rapper Nasty C. It was released by Def Jam Recordings and Universal Music Group on August 28, 2020. The album features several American artists, Ari Lennox, T.I., Lil Keed and Lil Gotit.

The album was later considered for a Grammy Nomination for the Best Global Music Album award at the 63rd Annual Grammy Awards, but despite its record-breaking streaming numbers and high-profile features, it did not move beyond the consideration phase into the final nomination list.

== Accolades ==
List of awards and nominations received by Zulu Man with Some Power
Year	Award	Category	Results	Ref.
2021	South African Music Awards	Best Hip Hop Album	Won	

== Release ==
On August 28, 2020, Nasty C released his third studio album Zulu Man with Some Power is about fifty eight minutes and thirty one seconds consisting of 20 tracks. The album was released under Def Jams Recordings and Universal Music South Africa.

The album was preceded by five singles. "There They Go", "Eazy", "Palm Trees" and "They Don't", which features American rapper T.I., and the fifth and final single "Black and White" with American singer Ari Lennox was released 12 February 2021.

== Track listing ==
Credits adapted from Genius, AllMusic & Apple Music

No.	Title	Writer(s)	Producer(s)	Length
1.	"King Shit"	Nsikayesizwe David Junior Ngcobo	Nasty C	2:57
2.	"Steve Biko"	Ngcobo; Blasian Beats	Blasian Beats	2:25
3.	"That's Hard"	Ngcobo; Asheton Hogan	Pluss	2:09
4.	"Overpriced Steak"	Ngcobo; Darrius Willrich; Jacob Brian Dutton; Sam Wishkoski	Nasty C; Darrius Willrich; Colin Gayle; Sipho Dlamini; Jake One; Sam Wish	2:36
5.	"Feeling"	Ngcobo; GC	GC	3:26
6.	"La Vida Loca"	Ngcobo; Eliot Dubock; Robert Mandell	G Koop; Beat Butcha	3:24
7.	"Zone" (featuring Tellaman)	Ngcobo; Thelumusa Samuel Owen; Zino De Klerk	ZinoD; Nani; Zino De Klerk	2:50
8.	"How Many Times"	Ngcobo; Sam Wishkoski; Jacob Brian Dutton	Nasty C; Sam Wish; Colin Gayle; Sipho Dlamini; Jake One	3:08
9.	"Eazy"	Ngcobo	Blasian Beats	4:03
10.	"All In" (featuring T.I.)	Ngcobo; Tellaman; Lastee; Clifford Joseph Harris Jr	Nasty C; Colin Gayle; Sipho Dlamini; Select Play	3:53
11.	"Lose Some Win Some"	Ngcobo	Nasty C; IMPALA DRUMMERZ; Sipho Dlamini; Colin Gayle	1:31
12.	"Sad Boys"	Ngcobo; Tantu Beats	Nasty C; Tantu Beats; Beatsbydil; Colin Gayle	2:12
13.	"Black And White" (featuring Ari Lennox)	Ngcobo; Ronnie Eriic; K-So; Courtney Shanade Salter; Troy Taylor; Kevin Ross; J-Kits; Andre Brown; Anthony Griffiths	Nasty C; Colin Gayle; Sipho Dlamini; Kevin Ross; J-Kits	3:37
14.	"Deep Pockets" (featuring Rowlene)	Ngcobo; Rowlene; Benn Gilbert Kamoto	Nasty C; Gemini Major	1:53
15.	"Bookoo Bucks" (featuring Lil Gotit & Lil Keed)	Ngcobo; Semaja Zair Render; Raqhid Jevon Render; Jacob Canady	ATL Jacob	3:54
16.	"Palm Trees"	Ngcobo; Taylor Banks; Joel Banks	Nasty C; Bankroll Got it	2:19
17.	"Zulu Man"	Ngcobo; Colin Gayle; Sipho Dlamini; Spacedtime Beats	Nasty C; Spacedtime Beats	1:50
18.	"Ababulali"	Ngcobo	Nasty C	3:13
19.	"There They Go"	Ngcobo; Cxdy	Cxdy	3:05
20.	"They Don't" (featuring T.I)	Ngcobo; Benn Gilbert Kamoto; Clifford Joseph Harris Jr.	Nasty C; Audiomarc; Gemini Major	3:59
Total length:				58:31

=== Sample Credit ===
- "Feeling" samples "Always" by Kota the Friend featuring Kyle

== Critical reception ==
Professional ratings
Review scores
Source	Rating
AllMusic	2.5/5 stars

== Personnel ==
Credits are adapted from AllMusic.

- Sipho Dlamini - Executive Producer, Producer
- Thulasizwe Dlamini - Composer
- Impala Drummerz - Producer
- Eliot Dubock - Composer
- Jacob Dutton - Composer
- Danny E.Beatz - Producer
- Ronnie Eriic - Composer
- Peter Michael Fernandes - Composer
- G Koop - Producer
- Colin Gayle - Executive Producer, Producer
- ATL Jacob - Producer
- Bankroll Got It - Producer
- Joel Banks - Composer
- Taylor Banks - Composer
- Beat Butcha - Producer
- Blasian Beats - Producer
- Tantu Beats - Producer
- Beatsbydil - Producer
- Pluss - Producer
- Courtney Salters - Composer
- Spacedtime - Producer
- Jerren Spruill - Composer
- Troy Taylor - Composer, Vocal Producer
- Telleman - Vocal Producer
- Thandanani Makomborero Chehore -

Composer

- T.I. - Primary Artist, Rap, Vocal Producer, Vocals
- Dilan Llamas Urías - Composer
- Earl Washington - Engineer, Mixing Engineer
- Darrius Willrich - Composer, Producer
- Sam Wishkoski - Composer, Producer
- Rowlene - Composer, Primary Artist, Vocals
- Che Olson - Composer
- Nani - Producer
- Nsikayesizwe David Junior Ngcobo - Composer, Executive Producer, Producer
- Anthony Mundle - A&R
- Mike Manitshana - Assistant Mastering Engineer, Engineer, Mastering Engineer, Mixing, Mixing Engineer
- Roy Lenzo - Engineer, Mixing Engineer
- Jacob Canady - Composer
- Gary Cheung - Composer
- Cxdy - Producer
- Zino D - Producer
