= Lloyiso =

South African singer-songwriter (born 1999)

- Born: Loyiso Gijana; 8 March 1999 (age 27); Uitenhage, Eastern Cape, South Africa
- Genres: Afropop; pop
- Occupation: Singer-songwriter
- Instruments: Vocals; piano
- Years active: 2015 – present
- Labels: Ambitiouz Entertainment (former); Universal Music South Africa; Republic Records

Loyiso Gijana (born 8 March 1999), professionally known as Lloyiso, is a South African singer. Born and raised in Uitenhage, Eastern Cape, Lloyiso developed musical interest at the age of 12 and contested on Idols SA season 11 in 2015.

Following his exit from Idols SA, Lloyiso signed a recording deal with Ambitiouz Entertainment in 2018 and released "Nontsikelelo", "Intlizyo" featuring Langa Mavuso.

Shortly after his departure with former label, Lloyiso signed recording deal with Universal Music Group South Africa and Republic Records in 2021.

Towards the end of February 2023, Lloyiso announced his extended play Seasons and release date.

The EP was released on 31 March 2023. Seasons was entirely produced by Earwulf, Mr. Hudson, and Stargate. His extended play earned him 3 nominations at South African Music Awards and won Best Pop Album.

In early May 2024, Lloyiso announced Elephant in the Room Tour, the tour includes 4 dates. The tour is scheduled to start at Pretoria, 8 June, other 3 dates will be announced later.

In October 2025,Lloyiso announced his upcoming Never Thought I Could EP and European Tour. EP and Tour dates to be announced.

== Singles ==
=== As lead artist ===
List of singles as lead artist, with selected chart positions and certifications, showing year released and album name
Title	Year	Peak chart positions	Certifications	Album
Title	Year	ZA	Certifications	Album
"Nontsikelelo"	2018	—		Non-album singles
"Intliziyo" (featuring Langa Mavuso)	2019	—		Non-album singles
"Madoda Sabelani"	2020	—		Non-album singles
"Dream About You"	2021	—		Non-album singles
"Seasons"	2021	—	RiSA: Multi-Platinum	Seasons
"Love Runs Deeper"	2021	—		Non-album singles
"Easy On Me"	2021	—		Non-album singles
"Speak"	2022	—	RiSA: Platinum	Non-album singles
"What Would I Say"	2022	—		Non-album singles
"Let Me Love You Now"	2022	—	RiSA: Platinum	Seasons
"Run"	2023	—	RiSA: Gold	Seasons
"Give A Little Kindess (Choir Version)"	2023	—		Non-album singles
"You're So You"	2023	—		Non-album singles
"Real Love" (with Martin Garrix)	2023	—		Non-album singles
"I Hate That I Care"	2023	—		Non-album singles
"High"	2025	—		High / Higher EP
"Higher"	2025	—		High / Higher EP
"—" denotes a recording that did not chart or was not released in that territory.

== Discography ==
- Seasons (2023)

== Achievements ==
=== All Africa Music Awards ===
Year	Nominee / work	Award	Result	Ref.
2022	"Speak"	songwriter of the year	Nominated	
2022	"Speak"	Most Promising Artiste	Nominated	

=== South African Music Awards ===
Year	Nominee / work	Award	Result	Ref.
2023	Seasons	Best Pop Album	Won	
2023	Seasons	Best Male Artist	Nominated	
2023	Seasons	Best Newcomer	Nominated	
