= Nduduzo Makhathini =

South African jazz pianist (born 1982)

Dr Nduduzo Makhathini
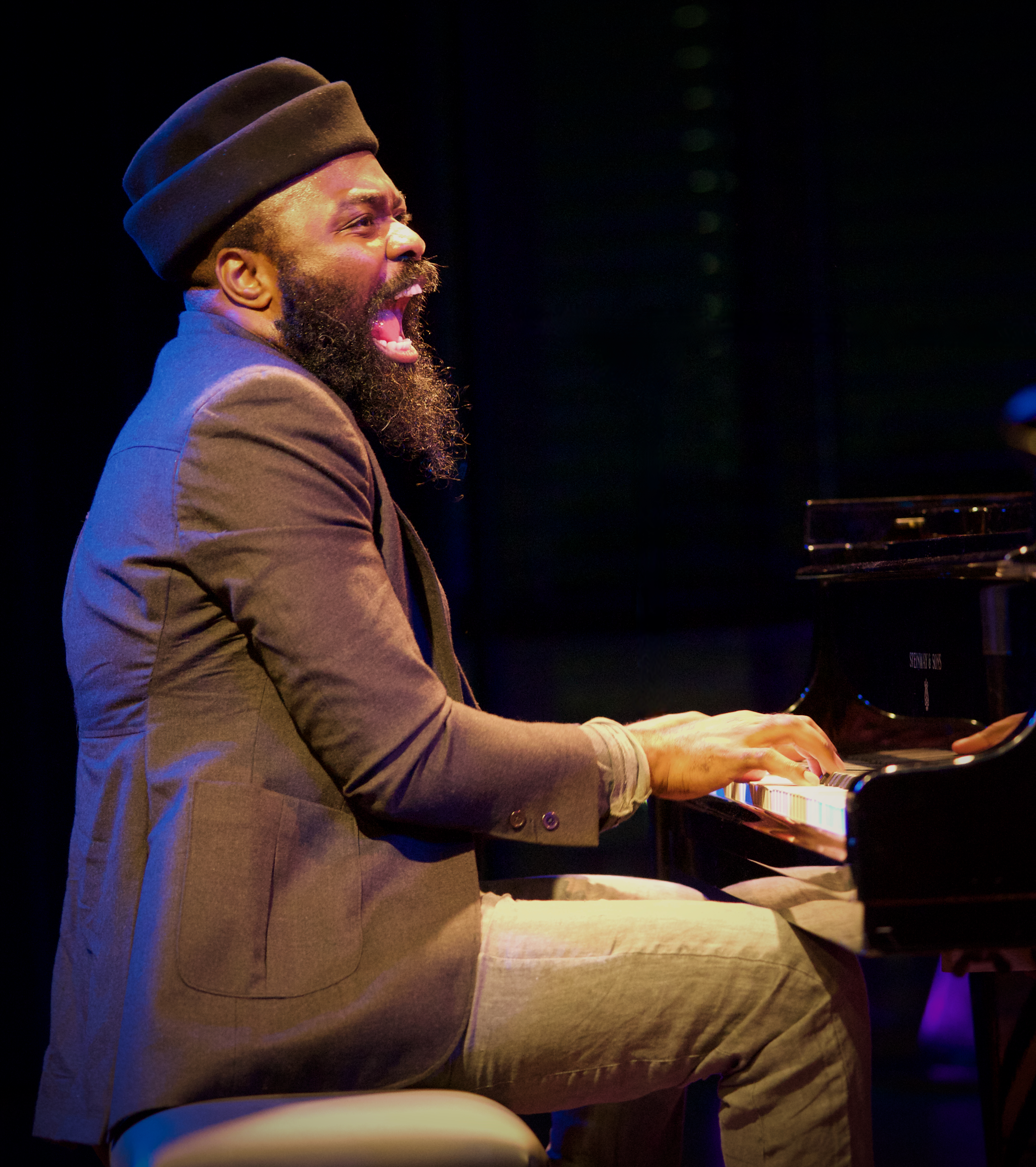
- Dr Makhathini in Amsterdam, 2021

Background information
- Born: Nduduzo Makhathini; 24 September 1982 (age 44) uMgungundlovu, Pietermaritzburg, South Africa
- Genre: Jazz
- Occupations: Musician; composer; lecturer; philosopher
- Instrument: Piano
- Years active: 2000–present
- Labels: Blue Note; Universal Music South Africa; Gundu Entertainment (self-owned)
- Website: www.nduduzomakhathini.com

Nduduzo Makhathini (born 24 September 1982) is a jazz pianist from uMgungundlovu, Pietermaritzburg, South Africa.

== Biography ==
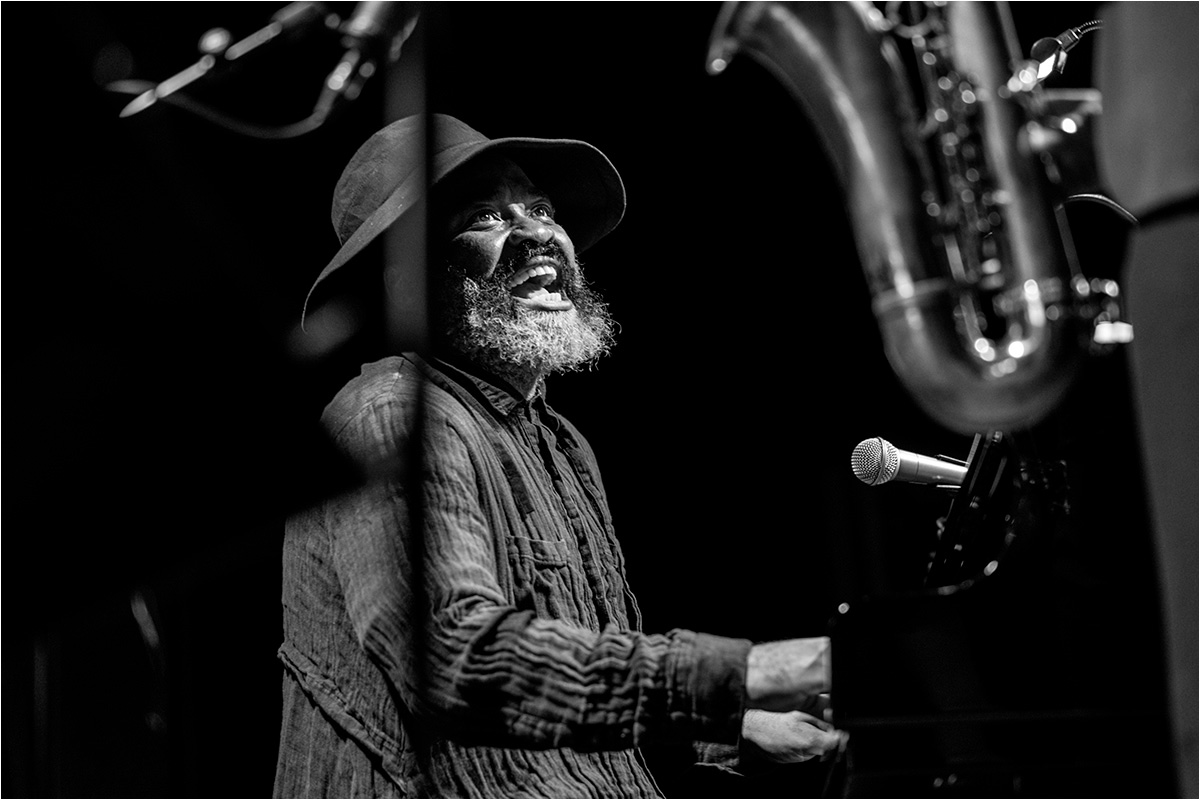
Makhathini with the Aarhus Jazz Orchestra, Aarhus, 2023

Coming from a musical family, his love for music began at an early age. Makhathini completed his Diploma in Jazz Piano at the Durban University of Technology in 2005 and obtained a PhD in music from Stellenbosch University in 2023. He has performed with musicians including Zim Ngqawana, Simphiwe Dana, Feya Faku, and McCoy Mrubata.

In April 2020, his studio album Modes of Communication: Letters from the Underworld was released by Blue Note Records. It was named one of the "Best Jazz Albums of 2020" by The New York Times and was followed by In the Spirit of Ntu in 2022 and uNomkhubulwane in 2024.

Makhathini has also been a part of the music department at the University of Fort Hare, where he was lecturer and head of the department. He later moved to KwaZulu-Natal where he currently resides today.

Dr Makhathini is a world renowned Jazz pianist having performed in various countries across several continents.

== Awards and honors ==
Makhathini was the recipient of the 2015 Standard Bank Young Artist Award in the jazz category; this award is hosted by the National Arts Festival. At the 2017 All Africa Music Awards, Makhathini won the Best Jazz Artist award. His musical output has led him to be described by Seton Hawkins of All About Jazz as "a truly singular pianist, an astonishingly gifted composer, and a deeply nuanced thinker on the music ... one of the country's [South Africa's] most remarkable talents."

== Discography ==
- Mother Tongue (Gundu, 2014) with Sakhile Simani, Mthunzi Mvubu, Linda Sikhakhane, Ariel Zamonsky, Benjamin Jeptha, and Ayanda Sikade
- Sketches of Tomorrow (Gundu, 2014) with Sakhile Simani, Mthunzi Mvubu, Jonathan Crossley, and Ayanda Sikade
- Listening to the Ground (Gundu, 2015)
- Matunda Ya Kwanza, Vol One (Gundu, 2015)
- Icilongo – The African Peace Suite (Gundu, 2016) with Sakhile Moleshe, Justin Bellairs, Shabaka Hutchings, Benjamin Jeptha, and Ayanda Sikade
- Inner Dimensions – Umgidi Trio & One Voice Vocal Ensemble (2016) with Fabien Iannone, Dominic Egli, Lisette Spinnler, and Jule Fahrer
- Ikhambi (Universal South Africa, 2016)
- Reflections (Gundu, 2017) – solo piano
- Modes of Communication: Letters from the Underworlds (Blue Note, 2020)
- The Blues of a Zulu Spirit (EP, 2021)
- In the Spirit of Ntu (Blue Note Africa, 2022)
- uNomkhubulwane (Blue Note Africa, 2024)
- The Myth We Choose (Blue Note, 2026)
