= Hell Naw =

Single by Nasty C

from the album Bad Hair and Bad Hair Extensions
- Released: February 11, 2016
- Recorded: 2016
- Genre: Hip hop; trap
- Length: 4:04 (Single version); 5:32 (Album version)
- Label: FreeWorld Music
- Songwriter(s): Nsikayesizwe David Junior Ngcobo
- Producer(s): Nasty C

Nasty C singles chronology
"Juice Back" (2015)	"Hell Naw" (2016)	"Switched Up" (2016)

Music video
- "Hell Naw" (Official Music Video) on YouTube

"Hell Naw" is the lead single from Nasty C's debut album, Bad Hair. The song talks about him not quitting the music industry. It debuted at number 4 on South Africa's official music chart. The song peaked at number 1 on The Beat 99.9 FM African Top 10 chart. It was made available for free digital download and has been downloaded over 11,000 times.

== Background ==
Nasty C told Mac G from 94.7 FM that he wrote the song and released it within 24 hours. Moreover, he said he started writing bars while listening to a beat he had produced earlier.

== Music video ==
The music video for "Hell Naw" was shot by Teddy Maxx and edited by Nasty C and Pierre. Nasty C assisted Teddy Maxx with directing it.

== Covers ==
J'Something, Mi Casa's lead vocalist, celebrated Youth Day by performing a cover of the song in June 2016. In July 2016, Nigerian rapper Hotyce released a cover of "Hell Naw", with production assistance from Emmeno.

== Accolades ==
"Hell Naw" won Best Song of The Year at the 16th Metro FM Music Awards.

Year	Award Ceremony	Prize	Result	Ref.
2017	16th Metro FM Music Awards	Song of The Year	Won	

== Charts ==
=== Weekly charts ===
Chart (2016)	Peak position
South Africa (EMA)	4
The Beat 99.9 FM African Top Ten	1
