= Strings and Bling =

2018 album by Nasty C

Studio album by Nasty C
- Released: 6 July 2018
- Genre: Hip hop; trap; emo rap; R&B
- Length: 52:22
- Label: Universal Music South Africa
- Producer: Gemini Major; Nani Chehore; Cxdy; Zino D; Canis Major; The Gobbla; Lenzo Beats; Mantra; Spacedtime; Stunnah Beatz; Tweezy; ZWill

Nasty C chronology
Bad Hair Extensions (2016)	Strings and Bling (2018)	Zulu Man with Some Power (2020)

Singles from Strings and Bling
- 1. "Jungle"; 2. "King (featuring A$AP Ferg)"; 3. "SMA (featuring Rowlene)"; 4. "Legendary"

Strings and Bling is the second studio album by South African rapper Nasty C. It was released by Universal Music South Africa on July 6, 2018. At the 25th South African Music Awards the album won the Best Hip Hop album and Best produced album.

== Release ==
On July 6, 2018, Nasty C released his second studio album, Strings and Bling. The album release was preceded by three singles: "Jungle", Strings And Bling features guest appearances from American rapper A$AP Ferg, Rowlene and Kaien Cruz.

== Reception ==
Times Live, a South African news website, noted, "Strings and Bling is worth your money and time". It was certified Platinum by the Recording Industry of South Africa.

== Track listing ==
No.	Title	Writers	Length
1.	Blisters	Nsikayesizwe David Junior Ngcobo	03:03
2.	Strings and Bling	Nsikayesizwe David Junior Ngcobo	03:44
3.	Jungle	Nsikayesizwe David Junior Ngcobo	03:03
4.	No Respect	Nsikayesizwe David Junior Ngcobo	1:26
5.	Legendary	Nsikayesizwe David Junior Ngcobo	3:21
6.	U Played Yourself	Nsikayesizwe David Junior Ngcobo	3:40
7.	King (feat. A$AP Ferg)	Nasty C	3:10
8.	Do U Digg	Nsikayesizwe David Junior Ngcobo	3:25
9.	Gravy	Nsikayesizwe David Junior Ngcobo	2:11
10.	SMA (feat. Rowlene)	Nsikayesizwe David Junior Ngcobo/Rowlene	5:15
11.	Another One Down	Nsikayesizwe David Junior Ngcobo	3:16
12.	Everything (feat. Kaien Cruz)	Nsikayesizwe David Junior Ngcobo/Kaien Cruz	2:47
13.	Casanova	Nsikayesizwe David Junior Ngcobo	2:29
14.	Mrs Me	Nsikayesizwe David Junior Ngcobo	2:32
15.	My Baby	Nsikayesizwe David Junior Ngcobo	3:14
16.	Givenchy	Nsikayesizwe David Junior Ngcobo	3:20
17.	Jiggy Jigga	Nsikayesizwe David Junior Ngcobo	3:00
Total length			52:14

== Charts ==
Chart (2018)	Peak position
South Africa (South African Albums)	1

== Certifications ==
Region	Certification	Certified units/sales
South Africa (RISA)	Platinum	30,000^{‡}
^{‡} Sales+streaming figures based on certification alone.

== Release history ==
Country	Date	Format	Label
South Africa	6 July 2018	CD	Universal Music South Africa
South Africa	6 July 2018	Digital download	Universal Music South Africa
