= Ragga Ragga =

2016 single by Gemini Major

Single by Gemini Major featuring Riky Rick, Cassper Nyovest, Nadia Nakai and Major League DJz
- Released: June 10, 2016
- Recorded: 2016
- Genre: Hip hop; trap
- Length: 4:14
- Label: Family Tree
- Songwriter(s): Benn Gilbert Kamoto; Rikhado Makhado; Refiloe Maele Phoolo; Nadia Nakai; Banele Mbere; Bandile Mbere
- Producer(s): Gemini Major

Gemini Major singles chronology
"Bumpy Ride" (2016)	"Ragga Ragga" (2016)	"Lifestyle" (2016)

Riky Rick singles chronology
"Sidlukotini" (2016)	"Ragga Ragga" (2016)

Cassper Nyovest singles chronology
"2 Legit" (2016)	"Ragga Ragga" (2016)	"Ayeye" (2016)

Nadia Nakai singles chronology
"Money Back" (2016)	"Ragga Ragga" (2016)	"Don't Cut It" (2016)

Major League DJz singles chronology
"Zulu Girls" (2015)	"Ragga Ragga" (2016)	"Sgetit (Umgulukudu)" (2016)

Music video
- "Ragga Ragga" on YouTube

"Ragga Ragga" is a song by Malawian-born artist and record producer Gemini Major. It was released on June 10, 2016 for free digital downloads and on June 24, 2016 on iTunes by Family Tree Records. The song was produced by Gemini Major, features Riky Rick, Cassper Nyovest, Nadia Nakai and Major League DJz. The song was an instant hit and received massive radio play, establishing Gemini Major as both an artist and a producer.

== Music videos ==
The music video for "Ragga Ragga" was released via Gemini Major's YouTube account on September 30, 2016 and has over 1.2 million views.

== Accolades ==
Year	Award ceremony	Prize	Result
2016	South African Hip Hop Awards 2016	Best Collaboration	Nominated
