= Universal Music South Africa =

Division of Universal Music Group, founded 1997

- Trade name: Universal Music (Pty) Ltd.
- Type: Public
- Industry: Music publishing
- Founded: 1997
- Headquarters: 26 Cradock Avenue, Rosebank, Johannesburg, South Africa
- Services: Music publishing
- Parent: Universal Music Group
- Subsidiaries: EMI Music South Africa; UMG Live Africa
- Website: umgsa.africa

Universal Music South Africa (aka Universal Music (Pty) Ltd. and often abbreviated UMGSA) is the South African division of the record label Universal Music Group, founded in 1997.

== Overview ==
Universal Music South Africa, was founded in 1997, as the second-largest African division of Universal Music Group. On 31 May 2012, P-Square signed a distribution deal with Universal Music SA. On 7 March 2016, Sipho Dlamini, was appointed the managing director of Universal Music South Africa. On 4 November 2016, Dominic Neill signed a record deal with Universal Music SA. On 21 February 21, 2018, Pino Di Benedetto, was added to the director board of Universal Music South Africa. On 18 May 2018, Tellaman signed a record deal with Universal Music South Africa. On 16 April 2019, 25K joined Universal Music South Africa artist roaster.

In 2020, Jeremy Loops signed a licensing deal with Universal Music South Africa, in partnership with Decca Records. On 22 May 2020, Jeremy Loops release his first single under UMG South Africa titled "Mortal Man" through Universal Music Group, Decca Records and Polydor Records. On 4 January 2021, Sipho Dlamini was promoted to the Chief executive office, of South Africa, and Sub-Saharan Africa. On 10 September 2021, Universal Music South Africa co-signed Lloyiso, in conjunction with Republic Records.

=== EMI Music South Africa ===
In the early 2010s, EMI became part of Universal Music South Africa, and began operating in South Africa, as EMI Music South Africa. On 16 November 2010, EMI appoints Pino Di Benedetto, as managing director of EMI South Africa and head of EMI Music South Africa till 2012, after the parent company became inactive.

=== UMG Live Africa ===
In 2017, Universal Music Africa launched UMG Live Africa, for talent and booking management, and the flagship of UMG Live, owned by Universal Music Group. On 21 February 2018, Universal Music South Africa, acquires the artist management company G Management, and appoints the director of G Management, Morgan Ross, to head UMG Live Africa.

== Partnerships ==
=== National School of the Arts ===
On 10 November 2020, National School of the Arts, signed a partnership deal with Universal Music South Africa. According to Universal Music Group’s Task Force for Meaningful Change (TFMC), said "The landmark partnership will include the newly renamed “Universal Music Department,” which caters for 165 learners from Uganda, Zimbabwe, DRC and South Africa, as well as hands-on support from the global music company in the form of resources, classes, industry participation, and internships".

== Artists ==
African artists signed to Universal Music South Africa, and EMI Music South Africa:

- Zahara
- ChianoSky
- DJ Sbu
- Tellaman
- Riot Zungu
- AB Crazy
- Dominic Neill
- Bobby van Jaarsveld
- Busiswa
- Nduduzo Makhathini
- 25K
- Jeremy Loops
- Lloyiso
- P-Square
- Vanessa Mdee
- Flex.valentino
- YNW Joker
- Mr Thela
- UNLIMITED SOUL

== Selected discography ==
=== Albums & EPs ===
Incomplete list of album and ep releases for EMI, and Universal Music Group in Africa
| Year | Title | Artist(s) | Details | Certifications |
|---|---|---|---|---|
| 2003 | O Mang? | Hip Hop Pantsula | 1 September 2003 | |
| 2004 | O Mang Reloaded | Hip Hop Pantsula | | |
| 2005 | YBA 2 NW | Hip Hop Pantsula | 17 October 2005 | |
| 2007 | Acceptance Speech | Hip Hop Pantsula | November 2007 | |
| 2009 | Dumela | Hip Hop Pantsula | November 2009 | |
| 2011 | Motswako High School | Hip Hop Pantsula | 31 December 2011 | |
| 2011 | Hungry | ChianoSky | 2011 | |
| 2011 | Motswafrika | Hip Hop Pantsula, JR | 2011 | |
| 2012 | I Am An African | Lungelo, Riot Zungu, Zahara | 2012 | |
| 2012 | The Homecoming | AB Crazy | 2012 | |
| 2017 | Blue Skies | AB Crazy | 3 November 2017 | |
| 2017 | Highly Flavoured | Busiswa | 8 December 2017 | |
| 2017 | Ikhambi | Nduduzo Makhathini | 29 September 2017 | |
| 2018 | Strings and Bling | Nasty C | 6 July 2018 | RISA: Platinum |
| 2020 | Zulu Man with Some Power | Nasty C | 28 August 2020 | |
| 2021 | Red | Lady Zamar | 11 June 2021 | |
| 2022 | Ivyson Army Tour Mixtape | Nasty C | 16 September 2022 | |
| 2023 | I Love It Here | Nasty C | 16 September 2023 | |
