= Aewon Wolf =

Arnold Phillips
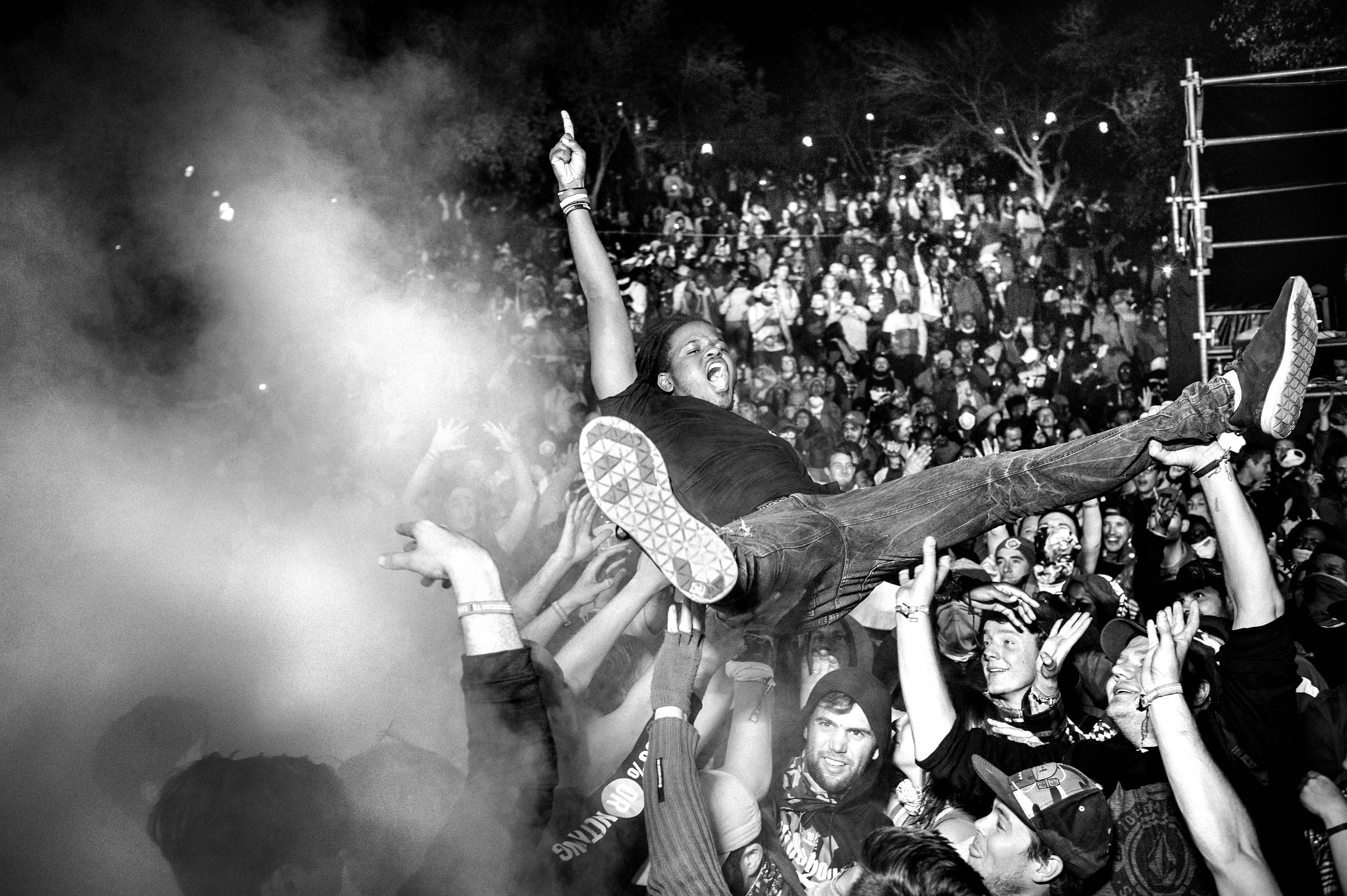
- Aewon Wolf stagedives at the Red Bull Studios stage at Oppikoppi Festival in Northam, Limpopo on August 6, 2016

Background information
- Also known as: Aewon Wolf
- Born: Arnold Phillips; 24 March 1988 (age 38); Durban, KwaZulu-Natal, South Africa
- Genres: Hip-Hop
- Occupations: Rapper; Singer; Songwriter; Director
- Instrument: Vocals
- Years active: 2012–present
- Label: Wolfpack

Arnold Phillips (born 24 March 1988) better known by his stage name Aewon Wolf, is a South African rapper, singer, Director and songwriter born in Durban, KwaZulu-Natal. He is also the co – founder of the Durban creative collective called The wolfpack. He is also the founder of The Werehouse a lifestyle centre and events venue in city of Durban that has contributed a lot to the development of the Durban creative scene.

== Discography ==
=== Albums ===
Album title	Album details
Mural	Released: 18 January 2017; Label: WolfPack; Formats: Digital download

=== Mixtapes ===
Mixtape Title	Mixtape Details
Darkest Winter	Released: 5 August 2015; Label: WolfPack; Formats: Digital download

=== Extended plays ===
EP Title	EP Details
The Love EP	Released: 14 February 2015; Label: WolfPack; Formats: Digital download

== Singles ==
List of singles with chart positions and certifications, showing year released and album name
Title	Year	Peak chart positions (EMA)	Certification	Album
"A Week Ago" (with Tribal)	2015	—		The Love E.P
"Summer Fever" (featuring Gemini Major)	2015	—		Non-album single
"She Loves Me" (featuring Nasty C and DJ Capital)	2015	—		Non-album single
"Your Girl (Umuntuwakho)" (with Gemini Major, Pound and DJ Dimplez)	2015	—		Darkest Winter
"Walking & Dabbing" (featuring Gemini Major & Khuli Chana)	2016	—		Non-album single
"Download Me" (with Nasty C)	2016	—		Darkest Winter
"Pikachu" (featuring BACEgang)	2016	—		Mural
"—" denotes a recording that did not chart or was not released in that territory.

== Awards and nominations ==
Year	Award Ceremony	Prize	Work/Recipient	Result
2015	South African Hip Hop Awards 2015	Best Newcomer (Freshman)	Darkest Winter	Nominated
2015	South African Hip Hop Awards 2015	Mixtape of the Year	Darkest Winter	Nominated
2016	South African Hip Hop Awards 2016	Song of the Year	Walking & Dabbing (feat. Gemini Major & Khuli Chana)	Nominated
2016	South African Hip Hop Awards 2016	Best Collabo	Walking & Dabbing (feat. Gemini Major & Khuli Chana)	Nominated

== Endorsements ==
Aewon Wolf was hired by Cell C, a South African mobile phone company, to endorse its "Mega Bonus" and "Mega Data" pre-paid phone products.
