= International expansion of Netflix =

Expansion of Netflix

Netflix is a video on demand service, which began expanding its business starting in 2010. The platform started in the United States and expanded for the first time in 2010, to Canada. This marked the beginning of a long expansion process. By 2015, Netflix was operating in 50 countries. Today, Netflix is in over 190 countries, and has drastically increased its rate of expansion in the last five years. As of 2020, there were 203.67 million people paying for a Netflix subscription. Of those people, over 73 million are located in the United States.

Countries where Netflix is available (as of March 2022): Available Unavailable (China, North Korea, Russia, and Syria.)

Launch rollout timeline
Release date	Country/territory
January 16, 2007	United States (Note: Including the major territories of American Samoa, Guam the Northern Mariana Islands, Puerto Rico and the U.S. Virgin Islands)
September 22, 2010	Canada
June 30, 2011	Puerto Rico
June 30, 2011	U.S. Virgin Islands
September 5, 2011	Brazil
September 7, 2011	Argentina
September 7, 2011	Paraguay
September 7, 2011	Uruguay
September 8, 2011	Bolivia
September 8, 2011	Chile
September 9, 2011	Colombia
September 9, 2011	Ecuador
September 9, 2011	Peru
September 9, 2011	Venezuela
September 12, 2011	Anguilla
September 12, 2011	Antigua and Barbuda
September 12, 2011	Aruba
September 12, 2011	Bahamas
September 12, 2011	Barbados
September 12, 2011	Belize
September 12, 2011	Bermuda
September 12, 2011	British Virgin Islands
September 12, 2011	Caribbean Netherlands
September 12, 2011	Cayman Islands
September 12, 2011	Costa Rica
September 12, 2011	Curaçao
September 12, 2011	Dominica
September 12, 2011	Dominican Republic
September 12, 2011	El Salvador
September 12, 2011	Grenada
September 12, 2011	Guatemala
September 12, 2011	Guyana
September 12, 2011	Haiti
September 12, 2011	Honduras
September 12, 2011	Jamaica
September 12, 2011	Mexico
September 12, 2011	Montserrat
September 12, 2011	Nicaragua
September 12, 2011	Panama
September 12, 2011	Saint Kitts and Nevis
September 12, 2011	Saint Lucia
September 12, 2011	Saint Vincent and the Grenadines
September 12, 2011	Suriname
September 12, 2011	Trinidad and Tobago
September 12, 2011	Turks and Caicos Islands
January 9, 2012	Ireland
January 9, 2012	United Kingdom (Note: Including the Crown Dependencies of Guernsey, Isle of Man and Jersey, and the Overseas Territories of British Indian Ocean Territory, Falkland Islands, Gibraltar, Pitcairn Islands, Saint Helena and South Georgia and the South Sandwich Islands)
October 15, 2012	Sweden
October 16, 2012	Denmark (Note: Including the territories of Faroe Islands and Greenland)
October 17, 2012	Norway (Note: Including the territories of Bouvet Island, Svalbard and Jan Mayen)
October 18, 2012	Finland (Note: Including Åland)
September 11, 2013	Netherlands (Note: Including Sint Maarten)
September 15, 2014	France (Note: Including the country of Monaco, the territory of French Southern and Antarctic Lands, the sui generis collectivity of New Caledonia, the overseas collectivities of French Polynesia, Saint Barthélemy, Saint Martin, Saint Pierre and Miquelon and Wallis and Futuna, and the overseas regions of French Guiana, Guadeloupe, Martinique, Mayotte and Réunion)
September 16, 2014	Germany
September 17, 2014	Austria
September 18, 2014	Switzerland
September 19, 2014	Belgium
September 19, 2014	Luxembourg
February 9, 2015	Cuba
March 24, 2015	Australia (Note: Including the external territories of Christmas Island, Cocos (Keeling) Islands, Heard Island and McDonald Islands and Norfolk Island)
March 24, 2015	New Zealand (Note: Including the territory of Tokelau and the unrecognized countries of Cook Islands and Niue)
September 2, 2015	Japan (Note: First country in Asia)
October 20, 2015	Spain (Note: Including the country of Andorra)
October 21, 2015	Portugal
October 22, 2015	Italy (Note: Including the enclaved countries of San Marino and Vatican City)
January 6, 2016	Afghanistan
January 6, 2016	Albania
January 6, 2016	Algeria
January 6, 2016	Angola
January 6, 2016	Antarctica
January 6, 2016	Armenia
January 6, 2016	Azerbaijan
January 6, 2016	Bahrain
January 6, 2016	Bangladesh
January 6, 2016	Belarus
January 6, 2016	Benin
January 6, 2016	Bhutan
January 6, 2016	Bosnia and Herzegovina
January 6, 2016	Botswana
January 6, 2016	Brunei
January 6, 2016	Bulgaria
January 6, 2016	Burkina Faso
January 6, 2016	Burundi
January 6, 2016	Cambodia
January 6, 2016	Cameroon
January 6, 2016	Cape Verde
January 6, 2016	Central African Republic
January 6, 2016	Chad
January 6, 2016	Comoros
January 6, 2016	Croatia
January 6, 2016	Cyprus
January 6, 2016	Czech Republic
January 6, 2016	Democratic Republic of the Congo
January 6, 2016	Djibouti
January 6, 2016	Egypt
January 6, 2016	Equatorial Guinea
January 6, 2016	Eritrea
January 6, 2016	Estonia
January 6, 2016	Eswatini
January 6, 2016	Ethiopia
January 6, 2016	Fiji
January 6, 2016	Gabon
January 6, 2016	Gambia
January 6, 2016	Georgia
January 6, 2016	Ghana
January 6, 2016	Greece
January 6, 2016	Guinea
January 6, 2016	Guinea-Bissau
January 6, 2016	Hong Kong
January 6, 2016	Hungary
January 6, 2016	Iceland
January 6, 2016	India
January 6, 2016	Indonesia
January 6, 2016	Iran
January 6, 2016	Iraq
January 6, 2016	Israel
January 6, 2016	Ivory Coast
January 6, 2016	Jordan
January 6, 2016	Kazakhstan
January 6, 2016	Kenya
January 6, 2016	Kiribati
January 6, 2016	Kosovo
January 6, 2016	Kuwait
January 6, 2016	Kyrgyzstan
January 6, 2016	Laos
January 6, 2016	Latvia
January 6, 2016	Lebanon
January 6, 2016	Lesotho
January 6, 2016	Liberia
January 6, 2016	Libya
January 6, 2016	Liechtenstein
January 6, 2016	Lithuania
January 6, 2016	Macao
January 6, 2016	Madagascar
January 6, 2016	Malawi
January 6, 2016	Malaysia
January 6, 2016	Maldives
January 6, 2016	Mali
January 6, 2016	Malta
January 6, 2016	Marshall Islands
January 6, 2016	Mauritania
January 6, 2016	Mauritius
January 6, 2016	Micronesia
January 6, 2016	Moldova
January 6, 2016	Mongolia
January 6, 2016	Montenegro
January 6, 2016	Morocco
January 6, 2016	Mozambique
January 6, 2016	Myanmar
January 6, 2016	Namibia
January 6, 2016	Nauru
January 6, 2016	Nepal
January 6, 2016	Niger
January 6, 2016	Nigeria
January 6, 2016	North Macedonia
January 6, 2016	Oman
January 6, 2016	Pakistan
January 6, 2016	Palau
January 6, 2016	Palestine
January 6, 2016	Papua New Guinea
January 6, 2016	Philippines
January 6, 2016	Poland
January 6, 2016	Qatar
January 6, 2016	Republic of the Congo
January 6, 2016	Romania
January 6, 2016	Russia
January 6, 2016	Rwanda
January 6, 2016	Samoa
January 6, 2016	São Tomé and Príncipe
January 6, 2016	Saudi Arabia
January 6, 2016	Senegal
January 6, 2016	Serbia
January 6, 2016	Seychelles
January 6, 2016	Sierra Leone
January 6, 2016	Singapore
January 6, 2016	Slovakia
January 6, 2016	Slovenia
January 6, 2016	Solomon Islands
January 6, 2016	Somalia
January 6, 2016	South Africa
January 6, 2016	South Korea
January 6, 2016	South Sudan
January 6, 2016	Sri Lanka
January 6, 2016	Sudan
January 6, 2016	Taiwan
January 6, 2016	Tajikistan
January 6, 2016	Tanzania
January 6, 2016	Thailand
January 6, 2016	Timor-Leste
January 6, 2016	Togo
January 6, 2016	Tonga
January 6, 2016	Tunisia
January 6, 2016	Turkey
January 6, 2016	Turkmenistan
January 6, 2016	Tuvalu
January 6, 2016	Uganda
January 6, 2016	Ukraine
January 6, 2016	United Arab Emirates
January 6, 2016	Uzbekistan
January 6, 2016	Vanuatu
January 6, 2016	Vietnam
January 6, 2016	Yemen
January 6, 2016	Zambia
January 6, 2016	Zimbabwe

== Expansion timeline ==
In 2010, Netflix entered the international market by expanding into Canada. In 2011, Netflix began to expand more. From September 5 to September 12, 2011, Netflix began rolling out its services to over 40 countries in the Latin America and Caribbean regions. Netflix began its expansion into Europe in 2012. By the end of that year, Netflix was streaming in the United Kingdom, Ireland, Denmark, Finland, Norway, and Sweden. In 2013, Netflix launched in the Netherlands, and in 2014 Netflix continued its expansion further into Europe. Expansion to Australia and New Zealand occurred in March 2015. On February 4, 2015, expansion to Japan was announced to begin during the fall of 2015. On January 6, 2016 at Consumer Electronics Show, Netflix announced a major international expansion into 130 new territories (including most countries in Africa); with this expansion, the company promoted that its service would now be available nearly "worldwide", with the only notable exclusions including Mainland China, and other regions subject to U.S. sanctions, such as North Korea, Russia, and Syria. The company also announced a partnership with LG to market pre-paid services in Asia, Europe, and the Middle East. As of 2022, Netflix is streaming in over 190 countries, not including China, North Korea, Russia or Syria.

== 2010: Canada ==
Netflix entered the international market when they began offering their streaming service to Canada on September 22, 2010. At the time the subscription cost $7.99 a month, a rate that CEO Reed Hastings called, "the lowest, most aggressive price we've ever had anywhere in the world." However, despite the proclaimed low price, content selection in Canada was extremely limited. Data conducted in 2012 by Josh Loewen for Canadian Business Online found that in the United States there were 10,625 unique titles in Netflix's library, whereas in Canada there were only 2,647. However, there is also content offered exclusively in Canada that is not available in the United States. For example, a short-lived Fox sitcom, Running Wilde starring Keri Russell and Will Arnett, began streaming on Canadian Netflix the same day it began airing in the United States on network television. The show streamed on Canadian Netflix because there was no Canadian broadcast partner for the series. Regardless of streaming selection, it took the company less than a year to reach one million subscribers, approximately three percent of Canada's population. As of February 2014, there were approximately 5.8 million Canadians using Netflix, or 29% of Canada's English-speaking population. This number represents an increase in Canadian users by approximately 40% since 2012.

== 2011: Latin America, Central America and Caribbean ==
On July 5, 2011, Netflix announced its plans to launch its streaming service in Latin America, its largest expansion to date. At the time, Netflix had 23 million subscribers in the US and Canada. Entering the Latin American market meant Netflix had access to approximately 600 million people, or twice the number of people living in the United States. Although high speed internet in Latin America is not as accessible as it in the United States and Canada, upon the announcement of its expansion to Latin America, Netflix stock immediately surged 8%, bringing the company to a record share price of $291.

Beginning in September 2011, the company began its expansion to 43 countries and territories in Latin America and the Caribbean, offering content in English, Spanish, and Portuguese. Brazil became the first country in Latin America to launch the service on September 5. There the service was offered at $BR14.99 or approximately $9.10 per month, making it more expensive than in the United States and Canada. Rounding out the first five countries to launch streaming service in Latin America were Argentina, which followed on the 7th, Chile on the 8th, Colombia on the 9th, and Mexico on the 12th. Service spread to the other 38 countries in the following weeks. Among the content distributed to Latin America was programming from CBS, Miramax, and Showtime.

The launch in Latin America was not as successful as the company had hoped. While in Latin America, Netflix had no streaming competitors as it did in Canada, the digital divide (a lack of high broadband internet penetration) hindered rapid growth. In Brazil, for example, only 20% of the population had an internet speed greater than 500 kB/s a second; 800 kB/s a second are needed to stream Netflix's content. Furthermore, the lack of competitors in some ways slowed growth as well. Whereas in Canada new subscribers had been exposed to streaming content by other companies, the concept was newer to a wide Latin American audience, making some skeptical of the prospect. A banking system unused to recurrent monthly transactions exacerbated the problem. Still, while Latin American expansion happened more slowly than expected, Netflix didn't lose money for the expansion and their Canadian expansion happened at a faster rate than expected, making their first two forays into the international market fairly successful. Additionally, despite the hindrances to growth in Latin America, Netflix continued in pursuit of content expansion, signing a deal with Fox in May 2012 (for a July 15 start) to make its popular content (e.g., How I Met Your Mother, Glee, Bones, The X-Files, Wall Street) available in the region.

=== The 2011 controversy ===
The initial launches in Canada and in Latin America happened before Netflix's 2011 controversy in the United States. In September of that year, the company decided to switch to two separate plans and websites, one for streaming and one for DVD, and hiked their prices accordingly. The change to its business model was accompanied by a loss of approximately one million American users and a plunging stock price. Prior to announcing the change to service stock was valued at just around $300. After the price it plunged to less than $53 a share. Prior to this debacle, Netflix had been having its most successful quarter, mainly due to the decision to expand to Latin America. The company quickly lost all the money it made in the quarter it announced growth to Latin America, was forced to apologize, and rethink its changing model.

Bringing people back to Netflix after this came in two forms. First, it began work on producing its own original content – announcing its adaptation of House of Cards in 2011 for a 2013 air date and its revival of Arrested Development in 2012 for a 2013 air date. Second, it continued international expansion – the originals were able to travel alongside its international expansion since Netflix, for the most part, retained complete control of their shows' distribution rights.

== 2012: First European expansion: United Kingdom, Ireland and Scandinavia ==
Netflix started its expansion to Europe in 2012, launching in the United Kingdom and Ireland on January 9. By October 18, it had expanded to Denmark, Finland, Norway and Sweden.

According to Christof Baron, CEO of the international marketing group Mindshare, Netflix developed a strategy for its international expansion, "They start with a limited offer which doesn't cost them very much money and minimizes the risk. Then they collect very detailed data about what people like, and structure programming and investment around consumer behavior." This accounts for cultural taste differences and allows distribution deals to develop accordingly. By September 2013, Netflix had added token minimal content from Channel 4, ITV and the BBC, many of which are early series, with subsequent programs never made available on Netflix.

Netflix UK and Ireland reached its millionth subscriber faster than Netflix Canada, recording its millionth member by July 2012. In the UK, Barb Audiences reported Netflix as being extremely successful in the UK market. More than one in ten households in the country subscribed to the service by 2014. More than twice as many people subscribed to Netflix than to Amazon Prime. As of the fall of 2014, Netflix had three million UK subscribers which was more twice as many as it had in 2013. Netflix is estimated to have over 300,000 subscribers in Ireland as of 2016.

== 2013: Netherlands ==
Following the United Kingdom and Scandinavia, the next country in Europe to receive Netflix service was The Netherlands, on September 11, 2013. The Netherlands was the only country that Netflix expanded to in 2013, though, as the company decided to slow expansion to control subscription costs. The company spent $3 billion on subscription content that year. Kelly Merryman, the company's Vice President of Content Acquisition, revealed that shows that performed well on BitTorrent networks and other pirate sites were more likely to be offered as part of the expansion. Netflix's CEO further explained that illegal downloading helps to create demand, as users may switch to legal services for an improved user experience.

In the final quarter of 2013, Netflix gained more new subscribers from its pool of countries than it did from the United States for the first time since it began its European expansion, making international expansion increasingly important. As media analyst Anthony Wible has been quoted as saying, "There are only so many people in the United States. The rest of the world is far bigger and the addition of domestic subscribers will start to slow down at some point." At the end of 2013, the company had reached approximately 32 million users in the United States and had additionally had approximately 10 million users internationally.

== 2014: Further European and India expansion ==
By September 19, 2014, the service was also available in Austria, Belgium, France, Germany, Luxembourg, and Switzerland and India. While reception throughout the rest of Europe and India was relatively warm, it was fairly hostile in France because of fears that the launch of Netflix would begin to ruin the country's cultural exception – its focus on culturally specific media. This led to Netflix's decision to create a series called Marseille, essentially a remake of its hit series House of Cards within a French context and one of the company's first non-English language shows.

Prior to its international expansion in 2010, Netflix's subscriber base grew on average by 2.4 million people a year. Following its arrival in Canada, Latin America, and eventually Europe, its subscriber base has grown on average by 7 million people a year, making international expansion key to Netflix's continued growth in the global marketplace. Notably, the company has over 20 original shows planned for release in 2015 and 2016. In that bunch are Netflix's first non-English language series.

In 2013, Forbes magazine estimated that international streaming accounted for 15% of the company's value. Netflix has subscribed approximately 30% of households in the United States. If able to replicate that in the United Kingdom and Scandinavia alone the company would add 12 million users.

== 2015: Cuba ==
Netflix announced they would expand their business into Cuba in 2015, making them one of the first American companies to do so. However, this expansion brought numerous complications. The limited capacity of Cuba's internet speeds made it difficult to actually watch Netflix in the country. In addition, Netflix's mode required for payment was a barrier to those living in Cuba. Netflix only accepts credit card payments, which are not legal in Cuba. There are also accessibility issues in regards to Netflix's pricing compared to the living wage of those in the country. Therefore, even though Netflix technically expanded to Cuba, the streaming platform is not readily available to the Cuban people.

== Third European expansion: Italy, Portugal and Spain ==
On June 6, 2015, Reed Hastings announced, in an interview with the Portuguese newspaper Expresso, that Netflix would enter the Italian, Portuguese, and Spanish markets in October, and that it would install its Southern Europe support center (which will cover the previous three markets plus France) in Lisbon, Portugal.

== 2015–present: Australia ==
Netflix expanded into Australia in 2015. As of 2020, 12.2 million people have access to a Netflix subscription in Australia. In the time Netflix has been streaming in Australia, their popularity has grown immensely; the country has the second-highest penetration rate (the percentage of a country's population that subscribes to Netflix's platform) for Netflix behind Canada, where Netflix has been streaming for 5 years longer.

Netflix has struggled with streaming local Australian content. Local content has made up, at most, 2.5% of the content offered by Netflix since 2017. As of 2019, the percentage of local content has been as low as 1.7%. Ironically, the United States' Netflix catalogue has more Australian content than the Australian catalogue does. Further, the Netflix-produced Australian originals have faced criticism, especially when compared to the content produced by the Australian streaming service Stan. Whereas Stan's originals have had almost all positive reception, Netflix's have missed the mark. For instance, Netflix released Tidelands, a supernatural-thriller original, to Australia in 2018. The show was criticized by an Australian TV critic, Wenlei Ma, as "Not the show Australia deserves to represent us on the US streaming service." Other Netflix Australian originals include Pine Gap and Lunatics, which have both received negative reviews as well.

== 2017–22: China deal ==
During the CES 2016 announcement, Hastings stated that any potential expansion into China could take "many years", owing to the tightly regulated state of the internet and media industries in the country. While the company admitted that some of its original productions (such as Crouching Tiger, Hidden Dragon: Sword of Destiny) were meant to appeal to a potential Chinese audience, Hastings stated that the company was in the process of building relationships with local partners that it could form a joint venture with. Rights to House of Cards had previously been sold to Sohu, where it was a modest success, but was pulled by regulators.

On April 25, 2017, Netflix announced that it had reached a licensing deal with the Baidu-owned streaming service iQiyi, although specifics of the deal were not announced, some Netflix original productions will be available on iQiyi day-and-date with their premiere elsewhere.

== 2022–present: Russian invasion of Ukraine ==
Netflix ended its services in Russia because of the invasion of Ukraine.

"Given the circumstances on the ground, we have decided to suspend our service in Russia," a spokesperson said, via Variety.

Netflix previously announced that it would pause all future projects and acquisitions from Russia, joining many countries who have similarly cut ties with the country due to the invasion of Ukraine.

== Political controversy ==
Netflix has encountered political controversy for some of its international productions, including The Mechanism, Fauda and Amo.

An episode of the series Patriot Act with Hasan Minhaj criticizing the Saudi Arabia government was initially available on Netflix within Saudi Arabia but was later made unavailable in the country after a legal complaint from the government. In February 2020 the company released its first report of when it has complied with government requested content takedowns in their countries, a total of 9 times since its launch:

- In Singapore, Netflix complied with a request to take down The Last Temptation of Christ in 2019, The Last Hangover in 2020, and Cooking on High, The Legend of 420, and Disjointed in 2018.
- In Germany, Netflix complied with a request to take down a 1990 remake of Night of the Living Dead in 2017.
- In Vietnam, Netflix complied with a request to take down Full Metal Jacket in 2017.
- In New Zealand, Netflix complied with a request to take down the film The Bridge in 2015. (The report does not confirm which film by this name is the one taken down.)
- In Saudi Arabia, Netflix complied with a request to take down the episode "Saudi Arabia" from the series Patriot Act with Hasan Minhaj in 2019.
