= Bad Hair (album) =

2016 studio album by Nasty C

Studio album by Nasty C
- Released: 23 September 2016
- Recorded: 2015–2016
- Genre: Hip hop; trap
- Length: 58:32
- Label: Mabala Noise
- Producer: Nasty C (also exec.); Ganja Beatz; The Gobbla; Gemini Major; Alie Keyz

Nasty C chronology
Price City (2015)	Bad Hair (2016)	Bad Hair Extensions (2016)

Singles from Bad Hair
- 1. "Hell Naw" Released: 11 February 2016

Bad Hair is the debut studio album by South African hip hop artist Nasty C. It was released by Mabala Noise Entertainment on 23 September 2016. The album was made available for streaming and free digital download on Audiomack on the same day of its release, and was added to iTunes on 24 September 2016. It features guest appearances from Omari Hardwick, Riky Rick, Tshego, Tellaman, Erick Rush and Rowlene. Nasty C executive produced the album, along with contributions from "Ganja Beatz", "The Gobbla", "Alie Keyz" and "Gemini Major". The album was supported by one single —"Hell Naw".

== Background and promotion ==
Nasty C album tops "iTunes" and "Audio Mack" charts at number 1 spot. The album was made available for free digital streaming on "Audiomack". Within 24 hours to the official release and the album became the most streamed South African album of all time on the music platform. To promote the album, Nasty C called out on his fans via Twitter on 9 August 2016 to send a "head-shoulder" portrait with your bad hair to specific email. On 30 August 2016 Nasty C unveiled the cover of his awaiting debut album on Instagram and also used the medium to say "thank's to everybody that was a part of his album cover".

The song titled "A Star Is Born", which features American poet Omari Hardwick and South African rapper Riky Rick did not make it to the retail version of the track list, due to the song's samples not having been cleared in time.

== Singles ==
The album's first promotional single, "Hell Naw" was released on 11 February 2016. On 1 March 2016, the music video was released for "Hell Naw" and it was shot by "Teddy Maxx", Edited by "Nasty C" & "Pierre", Directed By "Nasty C" & "Teddy Maxx". On 25 May 2016 the single was classified a hit by The Times.

== Track listing ==
No.	Title	Writer(s)	Producer(s)	Length
1.	"Inspiration" (featuring Cassper Nyovest and Slikour)	Nsikayesizwe David Junior Ngcobo; Siyabonga Metane; Refiloe Maele Phoolo	Nasty C	1:16
2.	"Please" (interlude)	Nsikayesizwe David Junior Ngcobo	Nasty C	1:58
3.	"Check" (featuring Erick Rush)	Nsikayesizwe David Junior Ngcobo	Alie Keyz	3:50
4.	"I Lie" (featuring Tshego)	Nsikayesizwe David Junior Ngcobo; Tshegofatso Ketshabile	Ganja Beatz	4:03
5.	"Dont Do It" (featuring Tellaman)	Nsikayesizwe David Junior Ngcobo; Thelumusa Owen	Nasty C; Tellaman	4:16
6.	"Squad Goals"	Nsikayesizwe David Junior Ngcobo	Nasty C	3:13
7.	"Overload" (featuring Tellaman)	Nsikayesizwe David Junior Ngcobo; Thelumusa Owen	The Gobbla	3:29
8.	"Problems" (featuring Erick Rush)	Nsikayesizwe David Junior Ngcobo; Erick Rushubirwa	Nasty C	3:07
9.	"Pressure"	Nsikayesizwe David Junior Ngcobo	Gemini Major	2:56
10.	"A Star Is Born" (featuring Omari and Riky Rick)	Nsikayesizwe David Junior Ngcobo; Omari Hardwick; Rikhado Makhado	Nasty C	5:31
11.	"Good Girls and Snapchat Hoes"	Nsikayesizwe David Junior Ngcobo	The Gobbla	4:29
12.	"Hell Naw"	Nsikayesizwe David Junior Ngcobo	Nasty C	5:32
13.	"Forget" (featuring Erick Rush)	Nsikayesizwe David Junior Ngcobo; Erick Rushubirwa	Nasty C	5:24
14.	"25" (featuring Tellaman)	Nsikayesizwe David Junior Ngcobo; Thelumusa Owen	Nasty C	3:40
15.	"Vent"	Nsikayesizwe David Junior Ngcobo	The Gobbla	2:42
16.	"Phases" (featuring Rowlene)	Nsikayesizwe David Junior Ngcobo; Rowlene Nicole Bosman	Nasty C; Alie Keyz	5:43
Total length:				58:32

== Release history ==
Country	Date	Format	Label
South Africa	23 September 2016	CD	Mabala Noise Entertainment
South Africa	23 September 2016	Digital Download	Mabala Noise Entertainment
South Africa	26 September 2016	iTunes Store	Mabala Noise Entertainment

== Bad Hair Extensions ==
Bad Hair Extensions

Studio album by Nasty C
- Released: 2 December 2016
- Recorded: 2016
- Genre: Hip hop; trap
- Length: 71:16
- Label: Mabala Noise
- Producer: Nasty C (also exec.); Ganja Beatz; The Gobbla; Gemini Major; Alie Keyz

Nasty C chronology
Bad Hair (2016)	Bad Hair Extensions (2016)	Strings and Bling (2018)

Nasty C released Bad Hair Extensions, an extended version of his debut album Bad Hair on 2 December 2016. It features 4 new songs and a guest appearance from American hip hop recording artist, French Montana.

=== Additional track listing ===
No.	Title	Writer(s)	Producer(s)	Length
1.	"Allow" (featuring French Montana)	Nsikayesizwe David Junior Ngcobo; Karim Kharbouch	Nasty C	2:59
2.	"Uok"	Nsikayesizwe David Junior Ngcobo	Nasty C	2:57
3.	"Asleep"	Nsikayesizwe David Junior Ngcobo	Nasty C	4:55
4.	"Represent"	Nsikayesizwe David Junior Ngcobo	Nasty C	3:13
Total length:				71:16
