= Nasty C =

South African rapper

- Also known as: Ivyson
- Born: Nsikayesizwe David Jr. Ngcobo; 11 February 1997 (age 29); Johannesburg, South Africa
- Genres: Hip-hop; rap
- Occupations: Rapper; record producer; songwriter; gamer; streamer; performer
- Works: Nasty C discography
- Years active: 2013–present
- Label: Tall Racks
- Partner: Sammie Heavens
- Website: nastyc.africa

YouTube information
- Channel: Nasty C
- Subscribers: 1.52 million
- Views: 390 million
- Last updated: 28 November 2025

Nsikayesizwe David Junior Ngcobo (born 11 February 1997), known professionally as Nasty C, is a South African rapper, songwriter, and record producer.

After releasing three mixtapes and two EPs, Ngcobo released his debut album Bad Hair (2016), and Strings and Bling (2018), which was associated and supported by his first tour, The Ivyson Tour. In March 2020, he signed a joint venture deal with Def Jam Records. After the deal, he released his United States official single after joining Def Jam "There They Go" which gained him global recognition. In August 2020, he released his third studio album, Zulu Man with Some Power, the first under his new label. In September 2022, Nasty C released a mixed tape titled the Ivyson Army. He released two singles back-to-back, No More in June 2023, and Crazy Crazy in July 2023.

Nasty C was the youngest recipient of an award alongside Aewon Wolf and many at the 2015 South African Hip Hop Awards, namely the Best Freshman Award.

== Life and career ==
=== 2006–2015: Early life and initial mixtapes ===
Nsikayesizwe David Junior Ngcobo was born on 11 February 1997 in Diepkloof, a borough of Soweto, Johannesburg. After the death of his mother who was involved in a car accident when he was 11 months old, he relocated to Durban, Kwa-Zulu Natal, to be raised by his father, David Maviyo Ngcobo, who is a human resources manager. His older brother Siyabonga Ngcobo influenced him to become a rapper as David learnt the basics of producing music from him at the age of nine. David also has a younger brother Olwethu Ngcobo. David attended Strelitzia Secondary School in Lotus Park, Durban, where he completed 12th grade.

At the age of fourteen, Ngcobo released his debut mixtape One Kid, a Thousand Coffins on 14 May 2012. He then released his debut EP L.A.M.E (Levitating Above My Enemies) on 4 April 2014. The following year, 2015, on 10 February, he released his second mixtape Price City, which produced the successful single "Juice Back" that raised his prominence. "Juice Back" later spawned a Gemini Major-produced remix featuring singer Davido and rapper Cassper Nyovest on 30 November 2015.

=== 2016–2017: Bad Hair ===
On 11 February 2016, Ngcobo released "Hell Naw" which was later revealed to be the lead single from his upcoming debut album. On 23 September, Ngcobo then released his debut album, Bad Hair under Mabala Noise Entertainment. For the album's artwork, he got his fans on Twitter to email him their portraits showing their bad hair periods, he then combined all the portraits in an artistic manner assembling his face. Bad Hair reached number-one on the iTunes local charts and was the most streamed album in South Africa within its 24 hours. Ngcobo released a 15-minute film featuring three songs from Bad Hair directed by Kyle Lewis. The short-film which included tracks "Don't Do It'", "Good Girls and Snapchat Hoes" and "Phases" featuring Rowlene, was commercially featured in several countries including France, Germany, United Kingdom and United States, which was infrequent for an African video.

On 2 December 2016, Ngcobo released the extended version for Bad Hair named Bad Hair Extensions. Bad Hair Extension featured new four songs including the lead single Allow featuring American rapper French Montana. In winning many accolades for both 2016 and 2017, Ngcobo received his biggest nomination which was for the 2017 BET Award for Best International Act: Africa where he lost to Wizkid. He was also nominated for the 2017 MTV Europe Music Awards. Ngcobo was ranked third on the 2016 MTV Base: SA's Hottest MCs. In 2017 he was ranked again on the same event, this time at the fourth place.

=== 2018: UMG deals and Strings and Bling ===
On 16 February, Ngcobo signed a distribution deal with Universal Music Africa in partnership with Universal Music South Africa and a talent booking deal with UMG Live Africa. On 1 June, during his visit to Nigeria, he signed a distribution deal with Universal Music Group Nigeria, before the pre-release of his singles, "Jungle" and "King" featuring American rapper A$AP Ferg, from his second album, Strings and Bling. In June 2018, during a press release with Premium Times, the general manager of Universal Music Group Nigeria, Ezegozie Eze said "Strings and Bling is a testament to skill, craft and passion that he brings to his game every single time, and we are thrilled to bring this excellent body of work to the market". Strings and Bling was then released on 6 July 2018 in both digital and physical formats. TimesLIVE named Strings and Bling one of the best hip-hop albums in South Africa, and it was also included in the list of hip-hop albums on Tina magazine. The album's other singles include "SMA" featuring Rowlene, and the promotional single "Gravy".

On 20 August 2018, Ngcobo established his own record label, Tall Racks Records. His long-term associated singer Rowlene was the first act to sign under the label, alongside himself. On 6 October 2018, Ngcobo began the Ivyson Tour in Durban, South Africa. The tour with five consecutive shows (four in South Africa and one in Namibia) was a success with filled up attendance. At the end of 2018 he was ranked in MTV Base: SA's Hottest MCs for the third time in a row, at the third place.

As for 2019, Ngcobo was named the ambassador of the male grooming company, Axe South Africa. At the 2019 Dstv Mzansi Viewers Choice Awards his single "SMA (Vol. 1)" featuring Rowlene was nominated for Favourite Song Of the Year. On November 24, 2019, he took home two AFRIMA awards includes Best African Rapper/Lyricist and Best African Collaboration. He was also ranked at the top of MTV Base: SA's Hottest MCs for 2019, his fourth time in the row being ranked in that list.

=== 2019–2021: Def Jam, Def Jam Africa and Zulu Man with Some Power ===
Ngcobo made the third installment of his concert tour, The Ivyson Tour, which kicked-off on 20 September 2019, in Cape Town, South Africa. On 27 September 2019, he released "God Flow" featuring rapper crownedYung, the lead single of his then-upcoming third studio album, Zulu Man with Some Power. It was reported that there were international artists who would appear on the album.

In March 2020, Billboard reported that Nasty C signed a joint venture deal with Def Jam Records, with the release of single "There They Go" as his debut under the label.

In April 2020, Nasty C released the visual EP Lost Files, with the songs presented in performance clips on YouTube. He explained the EP's concept stating: "They're songs that didn't make it onto certain projects, songs that ended up as just ideas". On 14 May, the EP was uploaded on Apple Music.

On 20 May 2020, Nasty C made his acting debut with a cameo role in the six-part Netflix African original young adult series Blood & Water, playing the role of Zhero. On 28 May 2020, Nasty C signed with Universal Music Group flagship Def Jam Africa. On 5 June, Nasty C teamed up with American rapper, T.I., for the protest song "They Don't". Proceeds from the song benefit the non-profit organizations Until Freedom and Solidarity Fund, with lyrics referencing the murder of George Floyd. On 25 June, he released a collaborative mixtape with DJ Whoo Kid, titled Zulu.

After several postponements, on 6 August 2020, Nasty C took to his social media and announced that his much anticipated album Zulu Man with Some Power would be released within the month of August. He released the track list consisting of 20 songs featuring international and South African artists, including Lil Keed, Ari Lennox, Lil Gotit, T.I, Tellaman and Rowlene. The album was released 28 August 2020. In November 2020, Nasty C won Best Male Rap Act award at African Muzik Magazine Awards 2020 ceremony. In December 2020, he was ranked third in the MTV Base: SA's Hottest MCs list, his fifth time in a row to appear on that list.

In June 2021, he released a single titled "Best I Ever Had". At the 6th ceremony of All Africa Music Awards, he received three nominations for Songwriter of the Year, Best Male Artist in Southern Africa and Best African Rapper/Lyricist. He was ranked third again in the 2021 MTV Base: SA's Hottest MCs list, his sixth time in a row on that list.

=== 2022–present: I Love it Here, Ivyson Army Tour, African Throne World Tour, Thick & Thin ===
In May 2022, he embarked on the Ivyson Army Tour, which started on 7 May (Bloemfontein); the tour included 5 dates that ran from 7 May until 4 June 2022.

In June 2022, he landed a role on the Disney+ animated series Kizazi Moto: Generation Fire.

In May 2023, Nasty C and Cassper Nyovest announced African Throne World Tour, which includes 12 dates. It ran from 18 August, Arusha, Tanzania until 28 October, Johannesburg, South Africa.

In early August 2023, Nasty C announced his fourth studio album, I Love It Here, released on 15 September 2023. The album debuted number 1 in South Africa.

Nasty C and Cassper, announced their upcoming collaborative album, Thick & Thin, on L-Tido's podcast in early December 2023, with a release date to be announced. They also revealed that are planning second leg of African Throne World Tour.

In July 2024, Nasty C announced his upcoming I Love It Here Tour, to commence on 18 October in Paris.

== Discography ==
=== Studio albums ===
- Bad Hair (2016)
- Strings and Bling (2018)
- Zulu Man with Some Power (2020)
- I Love It Here (2023)
- Free (2025)
- "T's & C's Apply" (2026)

=== Mixtapes ===
- One Kid a Thousand Coffins (2013)
- Price City (2015)
- Zulu (2020)
- Ivyson Army Tour Mixtape (2022)

=== Extended plays ===
- C L.A.M.E (2014)
- Lost Files (2020)
- Ivyson Pack (2024)
- Confuse The Enemy (with Lekaa Beats)(2024)

== Filmography ==
=== Television ===
Film and Television
Year	Title	Role	note	Ref.
2020	Blood & Water	Zhero	Guest role	
2020	Zulu Man in Japan	Himself	Documentary	
2023	Kizazi Moto: Generation Fire	Manzo (voice)	Guest role; episode: "Mkhuzi: The Spirit Racer"	

== Tours ==
=== Headlining tours ===
- The Ivyson Tour (2017–2025)
- The Ivyson Army (2022)
- African Thrones Tour (with Cassper Nyovest) (2023)
- I Love It Here Tour (2024)

== Awards and nominations ==
Year	Award Ceremony	Prize	Work/Recipient	Result
2015	South African Hip Hop Awards 2015	Best Freshman	Himself	Won
2016	South African Hip Hop Awards 2016	Lyricist of the Year	Himself	Nominated
2017	16th Metro FM Music Awards	Best New Artist	Bad Hair Extensions	Won
2017	16th Metro FM Music Awards	Best Male Album	Bad Hair Extensions	Won
2017	16th Metro FM Music Awards	Song of the Year	"Hell Naw"	Won
2017	BET Awards	Best International Act: Africa	Himself	Nominated
2021	SAMAs 27	Best Hip Hop Album	Zulu Man with Some Power	Won
2021	MTV Africa Music Awards 2021	Best Hip Hop Artist	Himself	Won
2023	Metro FM Music Awards	Best Collaboration	"Lemons (Lemonade)"	Won
2023	African Entertainment USA Awards	Best Hip Hop/Rap	Himself	Nominated
2024	African Entertainment USA Awards	Best Hip Hop/Rap	Himself	Pending

== See also ==
- List of hip-hop musicians
- Music of South Africa
- Def Jam Recordings
