= Kevin Ross (musician) =

American born musician and producer

- Born: December 8, 1987 (age 38); Washington, D.C., United States
- Genres: R&B; Soul
- Occupations: Singer-Songwriter; Producer
- Instruments: Vocals; Piano; Keyboards; Guitar
- Years active: 2009–present
- Labels: Motown; Art Society Music Group; EMPIRE
- Website: kevinrossmusic.com

Kevin Ross (born December 8, 1987) is an American born singer, songwriter and producer. He previously was signed to Motown Records and he released his debut album The Awakening in March 2017. Ross is also an award-winning songwriter, having written songs for artists such as Trey Songz, Nicki Minaj, Jamie Foxx, SWV, Johnny Gill and Toni Braxton. He began to become well known in 2014 after being featured in a Glade holiday campaign that year, charting with his version of the song "This Is My Wish".

== Early life ==
Born and raised in the DMV area, Ross came from a family full of musicians. As a child, he was heavily influenced by his father's side of the family, who all sang and played musical instruments. He attended the Duke Ellington School of the Arts, a performing arts high school in Washington, D.C. After covering songs from Stevie Wonder in a Motown tribute during his second year, Ross knew he wanted to pursue a career as a musician. Following high school, he accepted a scholarship to the Berklee College of Music in Boston, where he studied contemporary writing and production.

== Career ==
While attending Berklee, Ross appeared on BET's 106 and Park's as part of the shows Wild Out Wednesday competition. Ross ended up winning the competition and caught the attention of Troy Taylor. After graduating from Berklee College, Ross moved to Atlanta where he began his songwriting career. After successfully landing several songwriting placements with Trey Songz, Jamie Foxx, and other artists, Ross signed a recording deal with Motown Records.

=== 2014–2017: Motown and The Awakening ===
Ross's first solo release on Motown, Dialogue in the Grey, was released in 2014. The 4-track EP, which featured appearances by Ne-Yo and T.I, allowed Ross to tour nationally as the opening act for Maxwell's Summer Soulstice tour and Ne-Yo's One Night With Ne-Yo tour. That same year, Ross became the face of Glade's "This Is My Wish" holiday campaign. AOL named Kevin Ross their "Best New Artist" for 2014. In 2015, Ross announced the release of his debut album on Motown, The Awakening. However, the project would not be released until 2017. During that time, Ross created a 1990s R&B mash up series. In 2016, Ross released his first official single from this debut album entitled "Long Song Away". The single peaked at No.1 on Billboard's Adult R&B Song chart and radio's Urban Adult Contemporary chart, making him the first debut Motown recording artist since 2010 to accomplish that. Ross's debut album, The Awakening, was officially released on March 24, 2017 on the Motown/Verve record label and it features appearances from Chaz French, BJ the Chicago Kid, Lecrae and production from Babyface. On September 17, 2017, Ross announced the release of his third EP, Drive.

=== 2018–present: Motown Exit and Audacity ===
After the release of Drive, Ross took a brief hiatus from the music industry. In January 2019, he reemerge and announced his exit from his recording label Motown and the creation of his own label, Art Society Music Group. When asked his reason for leaving Motown, Ross says "I wanted to have the freedom to decide who I am doing co-ventures with. It’s just like in any kind of business, when you have too many cooks that’s within the kitchen, sometimes you don’t get the best result, especially when everyone doesn’t have the same end goal in mind. Everyone can have great intentions, but if you’re not on the same page, good intentions are kind of pointless." In addition to the new label, Ross announced that a new single, Thing Called Love, and a new album, Audacity, would be released in the spring of 2019, but it was postponed. In December 2019, Ross announced the release of the 7-track EP Audacity, Vol. 1 on January 31, 2020.

== Discography ==
=== Studio albums ===
| Title | Album details | Peak chart positions | |
| Title | Album details | US | US Heat |
|---|---|---|---|
| The Awakening | Released: March 24, 2017; Label: Motown; Formats: Digital download, CD | — | 16 |
| Drive 2 | Released: October 29, 2021; Label: Art Society Music Group (AMG) / EMPIRE | | |
"—" denotes an album that did not chart or was not released in that territory.

=== EPs ===
List of EPs with selected album details
| Title | Details |
|---|---|
| Dialogue in the Grey | Released: September 16, 2014; Label: Motown; Formats: Digital download |
| Long Song Away | Released: December 9, 2016; Label: Motown; Formats: Digital download |
| Drive | Released: September 29, 2017; Label: Motown; Formats: Digital download |
| Audacity, Vol. 1 | Released: January 31, 2020; Label: Art Society Music Group; Formats: Digital download |
| Audacity, Vol. 2 | Released: August 14, 2020; Label: Art Society Music Group; Formats: Digital download |
| Midnight Microdose, Vol. 1 | Released: May 26, 2023; Label: Art Society Music Group / EMPIRE; Formats: Digital download |
| Midnight Microdose, Vol. 2 | Released: September 15, 2023; Label: Art Society Music Group / EMPIRE; Formats: Digital download |

=== Singles ===
List of singles as lead artist, with selected chart positions
| Title | Year | Peak chart positions | | | Album |
| Title | Year | US | US Adult R&B | US R&B | Album |
|---|---|---|---|---|---|
| "This is My Wish" | 2014 | — | — | 16 | Dialogue in the Grey |
| "Long Song Away" | 2016 | — | 1 | 23 | The Awakening |
| "Don't Go" | 2017 | — | 15 | — | The Awakening |
| "Thing Called Love" | 2019 | — | 20 | — | Audacity, Vol. 1 |
| "God Is A Genius" | 2020 | — | — | — | Audacity, Vol. 2 |
| "Looking For Love" | 2021 | — | 9 | — | Drive 2 |
| "Love in the Middle" | 2025 | — | 4 | — | |
"—" denotes a single that did not chart or was not released in that territory.

== Tours ==
Headlining

- The Awakening Tour (2017)

Supporting

- Summer Soulstice Tour w/ Maxwell (2014)
- One Night with Ne-Yo Tour w/ Ne-Yo (2014)
- BET Music Matters Tour (2015)
- XIX Tour w/ Ro James (2017)
- NYLA Tour w/ Marsha Ambrosius (2019)
- Full Circle Tour w/ Babyface & KEM (2022)

== Writing and Production Discography ==
This is a list of the songs known to have been written/co-written and produced by Kevin Ross.

| Title | Album | Performer | Year | Credits |
|---|---|---|---|---|
| 2nd place | Still Winning | Johnny Gill | 2011 | Writer |
| Time to Go | I Missed Us | SWV | 2012 | Co-Writer |
| Use Me | I Missed Us | SWV | 2012 | Co-Writer |
| Favorite Thing | Original Soundtrack: Tyler Perry's A Madea Christmas Album | Kevin Ross | 2013 | Co-Writer |
| Sleigh Ride | Original Soundtrack: Tyler Perry's A Madea Christmas Album | MPrynt | 2013 | Co-Writer |
| Touchin, Lovin | Trigga | Trey Songz | 2013 | Co-Writer |
| What's Best For You | Trigga | Trey Songz | 2014 | Co-Writer |
| Dead Wrong | Trigga | Trey Songz | 2014 | Co-Writer |
| I Know (Can't Get Back) | Trigga | Trey Songz | 2014 | Co-Writer |
| Blast Off | Heaven's Door | Case | 2015 | Co-Writer |
| What Happened To | Kevin Hart: What Now? (The Mixtape Presents Chocolate Droppa) [Original Motion Picture Soundtrack] | Kevin Hart | 2016 | Co-Writer |
| Way Out | True Colors | Chaz French | 2017 | Co-Writer |
| Young World | True Colors | Chaz French | 2017 | Co-Writer |
| You Don't Know Me | Star on Fox | Star Cast | 2017 | Co-Writer |
| Sex & Cigarettes | Sex & Cigarettes | Toni Braxton | 2018 | Writer |
| Tru Shit | Tru Shit | Trevor Jackson & Jacob Latimore | 2018 | Writer |
| I Promise | Elevation | Tank | 2019 | Writer |
| Happy Without Me | Spell My Name | Toni Braxton | 2020 | Writer |
| Signs | Leo Season | Jacob Latimore | 2020 | Writer |
| Black & White | Zulu Man With Some Power | Nasty C ft. Ari Lennox | 2021 | Producer |
| Lessons (Remix) | Lessons | Eric Roberson ft. Anthony Hamilton, Raheem Devaughn and Kevin Ross | 2021 | Co-Writer/Performer |

== Awards and nominations ==
| Year | Awards | Category | Work | Result |
|---|---|---|---|---|
| 2016 | ASCAP Rhythm and Soul Awards | Top R&B Song | Trey Songz ft. Nicki Minaj – Touchin', Lovin | Won |
| 2017 | Soul Train Music Awards | Best New Artist | | Nominated |
| 2017 | NAACP Image Awards | Outstanding New Artist | The Awakening | Nominated |
| 2017 | iHeart Radio Music Awards | New R&B Artist | | Nominated |
