= Usimamane =

South African rapper

Omuhleumnguni Simamane (born 12 January 2003) professionally known as Usimamane, is a South African rapper and songwriter.

== Early life ==
Simamame was born and raised in Umlazi, Durban, KwaZulu-Natal, South Africa.

== Career ==
Usimamane rose to fame with his breakthrough single "Cheque" released in 2024, which was certified 3× Platinum in South Africa. In June 2024, Usimamane was featured on Rap Life Africa by Apple Music. His debut studio album 20th: Days Before Maud, was released on 13 September 2024. 20th: Days Before Maud broke a record as biggest second-day streams in South Africa on Spotify by surpassing over 332, 000 streams. The song "Uvalo" with Sjava debuted number 4, prior reaching number 1 after 1 week later on Local Streaming Top 10 Charts.

== Discography ==
=== Studio albums ===
- 19th Deluxe (2023)
- 20th: Days Before Maud (2024)
- G-Wagon Music: Baby Tai (2026)

== Singles ==
=== As lead artist ===
List of singles as lead artist, with selected chart positions and certifications, showing year released and album name
Title	Year	Peak chart positions	Certifications	Album
Title	Year	ZA	Certifications	Album
"iFilimu" (Tony Dayimane, Usimamane)	2023	—		Non-album single
"Too Fly" (Priestdebeast, Solo Sae, Usimamane)	2023	—		Non-album single
"10th October"	2023	—		Non-album single
"Handling Business" (Tony Dayimane, Usimamane)	2023	—		Non-album single
"Cheque"	2024	10	3× Platinum	20th: Days Before Maud
"Life Isn't Fair" (PatricKxxLee, Usimamane)	2024	—		Non-album single
"Star" (Usimamane featuring Morena)	2024	—		Non-album single
"Mandelaz" (Youngwinner, Usimamane featuring Kaay9n)	2024	—		Non-album single
"—" denotes a recording that did not chart or was not released in that territory.

=== As featured artist ===
List of singles as featured artist, with selected chart positions and certifications, showing year released and album name
Title	Year	Peak chart positions	Certifications	Album
Title	Year	ZA	Certifications	Album
"Back In the Crib" (Trxcky Supreme featuring Tony Dayimane, Usimamane)	2023	—		Non-album single
"K'MELE NGIZWE" (Lowfeye, LaCabra featuring Blue Pappi & Usimamane)	2023	—		Non-album single
"Sek'hlwile" (Jerome Jr featuring Usimamane, Fxrgo)	2023	—		Non-album single
"Aibo" (Uncle D featuring Usimamane, Oliphantom, Tame Tiger	2023	—		Non-album single
"SFIKE SAMOSHA" (Stxxt featuring Usimamane)	2024	—		Non-album single
"Big Bank, Little Bank" (Sketch Panadic featuring Usimamane)	2024	—		Non-album single
"Funa Nton" (Hennybelit featuring Tony Dayimane, uSimamane)	2024	—		Non-album single
"Gone For Me" (Secret Jukebox featuring Usimamane)	2024	—		Non-album single
"For Me" (Sonic Banger featuring Usimamane, Horid The Messiah, Kane Keid, YungkiddReezy & Daystar)	2024	—		Non-album single
"Day Onezz" (Twister Twizz featuring Usimamane)	2024	—		Non-album single
"Made It" (Blxck_Kid featuring Usimamane, Iconikidz, TheSoundClout, Oceandrip)	2024	—		Non-album single
"Barbie" (Caseklowzed featuring Usimamane)	2024	—		Non-album single
"uNyaka" (Naughty Kid featuring Usimamane)	2024	—	"Woah"(Tony Dayimane featuring Okmalumkolkat and Usimamane	Non-album single
"From The Trap" (Emmanuel NM featuring Luka Pryce, Usimamane, EMkaySwitch)	2024	—		Non-album single
"—" denotes a recording that did not chart or was not released in that territory.

== Other charted and certified songs ==
List of other charted songs, with selected chart positions and certifications, showing year released and album name
Title	Year	Peak chart positions	Certifications	Album
Title	Year	ZA	Certifications	Album
"Uvalo" (Usimamane featuring Sjava)	2024	1		20th: Days Before Maud
"—" denotes a recording that did not chart or was not released in that territory.

== Achievements ==
=== Metro FM Music Awards ===
Year	Nominee / work	Award	Result	Ref.
2025	"Uvalo"	Best Music Video	Nominated	
2025	"Uvalo"	Best Hip Hop Song	Nominated	
2025	"Wishlist"	Best Hip Hop Song	Nominated	
2025	Himself	Best Male Artist	Won	

=== Urban Music Awards ===
Year	Nominee / work	Award	Result	Ref.
2025	Himself	Artist of the Year	Nominated	
2025	"Dangerous" (featuring Rick Ross)	Best International Collaboration (South Africa x Global)	Nominated	
2025	Himself	Best Hip Hop Act	Nominated	
2025	Himself	Best Newcomer	Nominated	
2025	Himself	Best Male Act	Nominated	
