= Gemini Major =

Malawian-South African singer

- Also known as: Rudebouy Major
- Born: Benn Gilbert Kamoto; 14 June 1990 (age 36); Blantyre, Malawi
- Origin: Johannesburg, Gauteng, South Africa
- Genres: Hip hop; dancehall; Afro pop; reggae
- Occupations: Record producer; Singer-songwriter
- Citizenship: Malawi (1990–present); South Africa
- Instruments: vocals; sampler; DAW; auto-tune
- Years active: 2010–present
- Label: Family Tree (former)
- Website: instagram.com/geminimaejor

Benn Gilbert Kamoto (born 14 June 1990), better known by his stage name Gemini Major, is a Malawian-born South African record producer and singer-songwriter. He was signed to Family Tree Records, a South African independent record label founded by Cassper Nyovest.

== Early life and career ==
Gemini Major finished high school in 2007 and graduated in I.T. in 2009. In the same year, he moved to Durban, South Africa to pursue his dream as an artist and record producer.

He has produced for a number of artists in a variety of genres including R&B, hip-hop, house, dancehall, pop and gospel. His portfolio includes production used in TV shows such as Gold Diggers, Forever Young and Mo Love.

In 2013 he moved to Johannesburg. After a chance meeting with Cassper Nyovest and his team at a video shoot for a song that Major had produced, he joined the Family Tree team. In the wake of the release of Nasty C's hit single "Juice Back", Major has become the go-to producer for some of South Africa's leading hip hop artists.

In 2015 Major was nominated for Producer of the Year at the South African Hip Hop Awards alongside South Africa's best hip hop producers such as Anatii, Riky Rick, Ganja Beats and Tweezy.

He released a single named, "Church" on 28 September 2017.

On November 20, 2020, his EP Slum Kid was released in South Africa. It features Nasty C, Riky Rick, Tellaman, AKA, The Big Hash and Emtee.

== Discography ==
=== Albums ===
Album title	Album details
Gem n Eye	Released: 1 February 2015; Label: Lalela Music; Formats: Digital download

== Singles ==
=== As lead artist ===
List of singles as lead artist, showing year released
Title	Year
"Badmanting" (featuring Aewon Wolf)	2015
"One Night Stand"	2015
"Bumpy Ride"	2016
"Ragga Ragga" (featuring Cassper Nyovest, Nadia Nakai, Riky Rick and Major League DJz)	2016
"Right Now" (featuring Nasty C and Tellaman)	2019

== Production discography ==
=== Singles produced ===
Song	Artist	Year
"Juice Back"	Nasty C	2014
"Ufunan" (featuring Kwesta, L-Tido and WTF)	Junior De Rocka	2015
"Summer Fever" (featuring Gemini Major)	Aewon Wolf	2015
"Badmanting" (featuring Aewon Wolf)	Gemini Major	2015
"Juice Back (Remix)" (featuring Cassper Nyovest and Davido)	Nasty C	2015
"Bumpy Ride"	Gemini Major	2016
"Walking and Dabbing"	Khuli Chana, Aewon Wolf and Gemini Major	2016
"Skelm"	Cassper Nyovest	2016
"Super Ex"	Cassper Nyovest	2016
"Mayo" (featuring Yung Swiss, Tellaman, Shane Eagle and Frank Casino)	DJ Speedsta	2016
"Ayeye" (featuring Cassper Nyovest and Carpo)	DJ Vigilante	2016
"Switched Up"	Nasty C	2016
"Belong"	Nasty C and Buffalo Souljah	2016
"Sidlukotini"	Riky Rick	2016
"Day Off" (featuring Nasty C)	Stilo Magolide	2016
"Ragga Ragga" (featuring Cassper Nyovest, Nadia Nakai, Riky Rick and Major League DJz	Gemini Major	2016
"My Heart"	Diamond Platnumz and Cassper Nyovest	2016
"Lifestyle"	Da Les	2016
"NDA"	Nasty C	2017
"Tito Mboweni"	Cassper Nyovest	2017
"Tired Of This Life"	Micl Snr	2021
"2Pac Tears"	Micl Snr, Cnotesche, Gemini Major	2024

== Awards and nominations ==
Year	Award ceremony	Prize	Work/recipient	Result
2015	South African Hip Hop Awards 2015	Producer of the Year	Himself	Nominated
2016	South African Hip Hop Awards 2016	Producer of the Year	Himself	Nominated
2016	South African Hip Hop Awards 2016	Best Collabo	"Ragga Ragga" (featuring Cassper Nyovest, Nadia Nakai, Riky Rick and Major League DJz)	Nominated
