= Tellaman =

South African singer

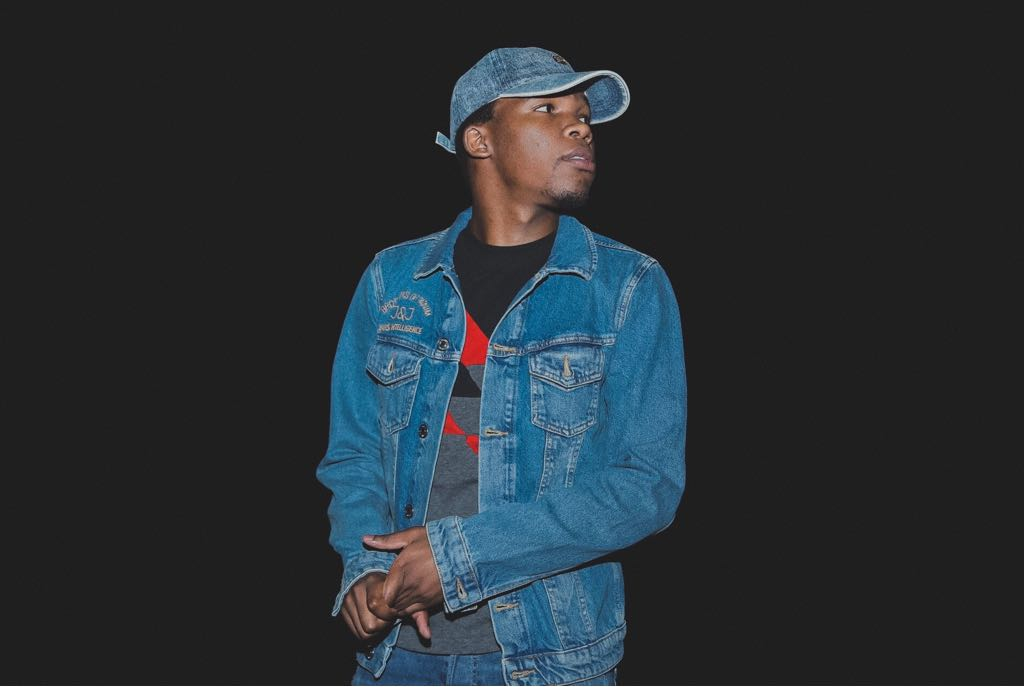

Background information
- Born: Thelumusa Samuel Owen; 12 April 1991 (age 35); Durban, KwaZulu Natal, South Africa
- Genres: Hip hop; R&B
- Occupations: Singer; Record producer; songwriter
- Years active: 2006–present
- Labels: Select Play Music; Universal Music South Africa; Motown Records; Virgin EMI Records; Def Jam Africa

Thelumusa Samuel Owen (born 12 April 1991), better known by his stage name Tellaman is a South African singer, songwriter and record producer. Growing up in a musical background, he is most known for a number one charting single by DJ Speedsta titled "Mayo" which features himself, Yung Swiss, Frank Casino & Shane Eagle.

== Early life and career ==
Tellaman was born and raised in Durban Kwazulu Natal, South Africa. He is a self-taught musician whose interest in music was sparked by his mother, who had him singing at home, at church and in a youth choir. At the age of fifteen he decided to pursue music as a career and began writing and recording his own music.

Tellaman was signed and featured in Soul Candi Record's compilation album titled Soul Candi Sessions 15, alongside MoFlava, Lulo Café, Cueber and Hareal Salko. Tellaman's disc, titled Ntsikelelo, included hit singles "Drinks and Music" featuring Okmalumkoolkat and "Intoxicated" featuring Lastee. The album sales passed Gold status and it was nominated for the Best Compilation Award at the 2015 Metro FM Awards. In June 2016 his EP Mind Vs Heart was released, followed by another EP titled Lucid Dreams which was released in February 2017. On 18 May 2018, he signed a record deal with Universal Music South Africa, and released "No Sharing", on 13 July 2018, as his first official single under Universal Music South Africa.

On 1 February 2019, Tellaman released his fourth album God Decides, through Universal Music South Africa. Lead singles from the album, include: "No Sharing", "Crew Lit", and "Practice". On 29 November 2019, Tellman signed an international deal with Motown Records and Virgin EMI Records. In May 2020, he signed a record deal with Def Jam Recordings Africa.

== Discography ==
=== Albums ===
Album title	Album details
Soul Candi Sessions 15	Released: 2 December 2014; Label: Soul Candi Records; Formats: Digital download, CD
Mind vs Heart	Released: 10 June 2016; Label: Select Play Music; Formats: Digital download
Lucid Dream	Released: 3 February 2017; Label: Tellaman Music; Format: Digital Download
God Decides	Released: 1 February 2019; Label: Universal Music Group; Format: Digital Download, CD

== Singles ==
=== As lead artist ===
List of singles as lead artist, with selected chart positions and certifications, showing year
released and album name

Title	Year	Peak Chart Positions	Certifications	Album
		South Africa (EMA)		
Drinks & Music (feat. Okmalukoolkat)	2014	–	–	Soul Candi Sessions 15
Intoxicated (feat. Lastee)	2015	–	–	Soul Candi Sessions 15
Noma Kanjan' (feat. Nasty C)	2015	–	–	Non-Album Single
Wena (feat. J. Something)	2017	–	–	Lucid Dream
I'm Gone (feat. Nasty C)	2017	–	–	Lucid Dream
S.A.P (feat. Nasty C & Da L.E.S)	2017	29	–	Lucid Dream
Whipped (feat. Shekinah & Nasty C)	2019	1	5× Platinum	God Decides
Cross My Heart (feat. Alpha P)	2020	–	–	Non-Album Single

==== As featured artist ====
List of singles as featured artist, with selected chart positions and certifications, showing year released and album name
Artist	Title	Year	Peak chart positions	Certifications	Album	
Artist	Title	Year	SA		Album	
Kwesta	"Act Like" (featuring. Tellaman)	2016	—		DaKAR II	
DJ Speedsta	"Mayo" (featuring. Yung Swiss, Tellaman, Shane Eagle & Frank Casino)	2016	1		Non-album single	8× Platinum
Nasty C	"Don't Do It" (featuring. Tellaman)	2016	—		Bad Hair Extensions	
Nasty C	"Dance" (featuring. Tellaman)	2017	—		Non-album single	
DJ Killamo	"On Some" (featuring. Tellaman, Lastee & Rowlene)	2017	—		Non-album single	

== Awards and nominations ==
Year	Award Ceremony	Prize	Work/Receiptient	Result	Ref.
2013	South African Music Awards	Remix of the Year	Select Play	Nominated	
2020	South African Music Awards	Best R&B/Soul Album	God Decides	Nominated	
