= 24th Annual South African Music Awards =

2018 award ceremony

24th South African Music Awards
- Date: 2 June 2018
- Location: Sun City, North West,South Africa
- Country: South Africa
- Hosted by: Somizi Mhlongo; Dineo Ranaka; Mpho Popps
- Most awards: Shekhinah (4)
- Most nominations: Mafikizolo (5),

Television/radio coverage
- Network: SABC

The 24th Annual South African Music Awards was held at Sun City, in the North West on 2 June 2018. The list of nominees was announced on 19 April 2018 at Birchwood Hotel in Ekurhuleni. Mafikizolo, Mi Casa and Shekhinah each received a node of nomination Other artists with multiple nominations include Mobi Dixon, Distruction Boyz and Riky Rick. It was aired live on SABC 1 at 20:00 SAST (CAT). The show was hosted by Somizi Mhlongo, Dineo Ranaka and Mpho Popps.

Shekhinah garnered the most awards with four while Mafikizolo came closest by claiming three awards. Steve Kekana, Mbongeni Ngema and Spoke H received the Lifetime Achievement Award in recognition of their career spanning over decades.

== Winners and nominees ==
Winners are listed in bold.

Album of the Year

- **Rose Gold – Shekhinah**
  - The Beautiful Madness – Tresor
  - 20 – Mafikizolo
  - King Zamar – Lady Zamar
  - Yellow – Shane Eagle

Duo or Group of the Year

- **Mafikizolo – Mafikizolo**
  - Sofa Silahlane – Team Mosha
  - Late Night People – Goldfish
  - Familia – Mi Casa
  - If You Don't You Never Will – Prime Circle

Female Artist of the Year

- **Rose Gold – Shekhinah**
  - King Zamar – Lady Zamar
  - Simphiwe Dana Symphony Experience – Simphiwe Dana
  - Highly Flavoured – Busiswa
  - Siphokazi – Siphokazi

Male Artist of the year

- **I Am Music – Prince Kaybee**
  - Beautiful Madness – Tresor
  - Relationships – Afrotraction
  - Manando – Emtee
  - Ikhambi – Ndunduzo Makhathini

Newcomer of the Year

- **Rose Gold – Shekhinah**
  - Yellow – Shane Eagle
  - The New Era Session – Rouge
  - Blaq Diamond – Blaq Diamond
  - Songs About You – Thabsie

Best Rock Album

- **Selfmedikasie - Fokofpolisiekar**
  - If You Don't You Never Will – Prime Circle
  - Snakes & Ladders – Lost & Found
  - Blitzkriek – Willim Welsyn
  - TMK – Shortstraw

Best Pop Album

- **The Beautiful Madness – Tresor**
  - Barely Breathing – Connell Cruise
  - Monark Monark – Tresor The Beautiful Madness
  - Restless – Craig Lucas

Beste Pop Album

- **Die Danslover Brand – Kurt Darren Laat**
  - Sing Vir Liefde – Karlien Van Jaarsveld
  - Hy Loop Oop – Brendan Peyper
  - Uitbasuin – Ray Dylan
  - Iemand Om Lief Te H – Lianie May

Best Adult Contemporary Album

- **Symphonic Soweto – Wouter Kellerman**
  - Now Listen Properly – Swing City
  - Indie Soul – Josie Field
  - Life's Journey – Charlie Finch
  - Miscellany – Janie Bay

Beste Kontemporêre Musiek Album

- **Skepe – Joe Black**
  - Fantasies Okay! – Die Heuwels
  - Van Die Toorbos – Saarkie Queen
  - Jupiter Korreltjie Kantel – Luna Paige, Nick Turner, Jamie
  - Jy En Ek En EK En Jy – Chris Chameleon

Best Traditional Music Album

- **Jessica Mbangeni Sings Igoli Live @Lyric Theatre Johannesburg – Jessica Mbangeni**
  - Uthando – Bombshell
  - The Beginning – Complete Isiqalo
  - Pitsi – Dinonyane Cultural Group
  - Camarata Indodana Symphony – University of Pretoria

Best Maskandi Album

- **6 To 6 – Abafana BakaMgqumeni**
  - Emkhathini – Shwi Nomntekhala
  - Isixaxa Samaxoki – Khuzani
  - Miss South Africa – Uqhosha Ngokwenza Kwakhe
  - Wavuma – Mbuzeni

Best Jazz Album

- **Ikhamba – Nduduzo Makhathini**
  - Tribute Okestra Live At The Bird's Eye – The Blue Notes
  - Yellow The Novel – Zoe Modiga
  - Committee Voices Of Our Vision – Tune Recreation
  - The Simphiwe Dana Symphony Experience – Simphiwe Dana

Best R&B / Soul / Reggae Album

- **Relationships – Afrotraction**
  - The Greatest Hits – The Nameless Band
  - Songs About You – Thabsie
  - Busisiwe – Cici
  - Never Lost – Thami

Best Hip Hop Album

- **Yellow – Shane Eagle**
  - The New Era Session – Rouge
  - Stay Shining – Ricky Rick
  - Manando – Emtee
  - F2D Presents Hall Of Fame – Fresh 2 Def Productions

Best Kwaito Album

- **Highly Flavoured – Busiswa**
  - Sofa Silahlane – Team Mosha
  - Do more Squats – Chomee
  - Bona That Rural Dream – Mashabela Galane
  - Ska Ba Hemisa – Trendsetters

Best Dance Album

- **King Zamar – Lady Zamar**
  - House Grooves 10 – DJ Ganyani Ganyani's
  - Pure Black Album – DJ Merlon'
  - I Am Music – Prince KayBee
  - Familia – Mi Casa

Best Classical / Instrumental Album

- **Trio Baroqueswing Vol III – Charl Du Plesis**
  - Chilled – James Grace
  - Matimba Ya Vuyimbeleri – University of Limpopo Choristers and The Kwazulu-Natal Philharmonic Orchestra
  - Window To The Ashramt – Kinsmen
  - Insomnia – CH2

Best Traditional Faith Album

- **Andile Kamajola - Andile Kamajola**
  - Believer In Christ – Yala Nkosi
  - Bonke Abemethembayo – Futhi Shongwe
  - Soloko Intliziyo Yami – Amadodana AseWesile
  - BaMorena Ntjhafatso – Barorisi

Best African Indigenous Album

- **Samson Aphi Amandla – Vuma Zion**
  - Wonders of Mercy – Bongani Nchang
  - Victorious In His Presence With Benjamin Swazi The Alabaster – Benjamin Dube
  - Solid Rock – Sicelo Moya
  - Heaven's Ways – Nqubeko Mbatha

Best African Adult Contemporary Album

- **ILanga – Siseko Pame**
  - Time II Time – Joe Nina
  - Based on a True Story – Serame Sediti
  - Siphokazi – Siphokazi
  - Tribute Birdie Mbowenu – Tribute Birdie Mbowenu

Best Alternative Music Album

- **Mangaliso – Bongeziwe Mabandla**
  - Afrika For Beginners – Jack Parow
  - Hierdie Is Die Lewe – Francois Van Coke
  - The Morning Show – Josh Kempen
  - Your Princess Is In Another Castle – Loui Lvndn

Best Live Audio Visual Recording/DVD

- **Red Mic Experience – Donald**
  - Victorious In His Presence With Benjamin – Benjamin Dube
  - The Simphiwe Dana Symphony Experience – Simphiwe Dana
  - The Parlotones Orchestrated – The Parlotones
  - Krone For Live – Krone

Best Music Video of the Year

- **Arumtumtum – Rouge**
  - Naaa Mean – Nadia Nakai
  - Spirit (featuring Wale) – Kwesta
  - Don't Do It – Nasty C
  - Let It Flow – Shane Eagle

Best Engineered Album

- **20 – Mafikizolo**
  - Famila – Mi Casa
  - A Noise In The Void – Kahn
  - Makhathini Ikhambi – Nduduzo
  - Gqom Is The Future – Distruction Boyz

Best African Artist Album

- **The Simphiwe Dana Symphony Experience – Simphiwe Dana**
  - Sounds from the Other Side – Wizkid
  - Yellow The Novel – Zoë Modiga
  - This is Me – Niniola
  - M&M – Moreira Chonguica & Manu Dibango

Best Collaboration

- **Akanamali (featuring Samthing Soweto) - Sun-El Musician**
  - Omunye (featuring Benni Maverick & Dladla Mshunqisi) – Distruction Boyz
  - Spirit (featuring Wale) – Kwesta
  - Inde (featuring Bucie & Nokwazi) – Heavy-K
  - Ngempela(featuring Howard & DJ Maphorisa) – Sjava

Remix of the Year

- **I Got You – Mobi Dixon**
  - Faith Alive – King Bayaa
  - Fres – Household Funk
  - Buy It Out (featuring YoungstaCPT, KLY, Da L.E.S, Frank Casino, J Molley & Stilo Magolide – Riky Rick)
  - Mwanangu (featuring Jackie Queens) - Enoo Napa

Record of the year (Fan Voted)

- **Omunye - Distruction Boyz**
  - Spirit (featuring Wale) - Kwesta
  - Love Is Blinde - Lady Zamar
  - Akanamali (featuring Samthing Soweto) - Sun-EL Musician
  - Charlotte - Prince Kaybee
  - I Do (featuring Amanda Black) - LaSauce
  - Love Portion - Mafikizolo
  - Midnight Starring - DJ Maphorisa
  - The World Is Yours - AKA
  - Imali - Black Motion
  - Ngiyazifela Ngawe - Kwesta
  - Suited - Shekhinah
  - Love Me In The Dark - Sketchy Bongo

== Special awards ==
International Achievement Award

  - Shashika Mooruth

Lifetime Achievement Award

  - Steve Kekana
  - Spokes H
  - Mbongeni Ngema

Sales and Downloads Awards

Best Selling Album

  - Joyous Celebration Volume 21 Heal Our Land - Joyous Celebration

Best Selling Digital Artist

  - Joyous Celebration Volume 21 Heal Our Land - Joyous Celebration

Sponsored Awards

Highest Radio Airplay of the Year (SAMPRA)

  - Akanamali (featuring Samthing Soweto) - Sun-EL Musician

Best Selling Digital Download Composers’ Award (CAPASSO)

  - Timothy Bambelela Myeni

== Changes ==
In June 2018, the Sama Awards organization announced few changes to various categories namely Best Rap Album, Best African Adult, Best Africa Artist and The Best Kwaito Album.

- Best Rap Album has changed to Best Hip Hop Album. The renaming allows for Hip Hop DJs to enter their albums in addition to Rap residing in this category.
- Best African Adult has changed to Best African Adult Contemporary Album. The category does not carry language exclusion.
- Best Africa Artist has changed to Best African Artist. This has also been made a special category so that South African artists can enter their works and compete for the bragging rights of being named the best artist in the African continent.

== Controversy ==
In April 2018, The Recording Industry of South Africa (RiSA) announced that the artist Sands' entry for Record of the Year, "Tigi", had been struck off the nominees' list because Sands was a citizen of Eswatini. Mobi Dixon's nomination for Best Remix of the song, "Lake by the Ocean", had also been disqualified because it was a remix of an international song which was a contravention of the SAMA rules. "Tigi" by Sands was replaced by "Love Me in the Dark", by Sketchy Bongo on the nominations list. In the place of "Lake by the Ocean" by Mobi Dixon was the remixed song, which "Mwanangu" by Jackie Queens and VeneiGrette, remixed by Enoo Napa.
