= Frank Casino =

South African rapper

- Born: Nhlanhla Tshabalala; 09 November; Kempton Park, Tembisa, South Africa
- Occupations: Rapper; record producer; songwriter
- Years active: 2016–present
- Known for: Guest appearance on "Mayo"
- Musical career
- Genres: Hip Hop; Trap
- Instruments: DAW; Vocals; Auto-tune
- Label: Globe Field
- Website: iG.com/frankcasino

Nhlanhla Tshabalala, better known as Frank Casino, is a South African rapper and record producer. He is known for his guest appearance on "Mayo" by DJ Speedsta with Shane Eagle, Yung Swiss and Tellaman.

He went on to release his major single titled "Whole Thing" which was later remixed by Riky Rick.

In 2018 the rapper released a lead singles "Come Alive" and "Sudden" the latter with guest appearance from Cassper Nyovest and Major League DJz from his EP Heroes of Tomorrow which was later certified Gold by the Recording Industry of South Africa (RiSA), the latter which was also set to appear in his INDEPENDENCE DAY album.

== Discography ==
- Heroes of Tomorrow (2018)
- Something From Me (2018)
- By Design (2024)
