= Sicelo =

Sicelo is a South African given name. Notable people with the name include:

- Sicelo Moya, South African gospel singer
- Sicelo Shiceka (1966–2012), South African politician
- Sicelo Hlatshwayo (born 1994), South African soccer player
- Sicelo Mhlauli (1949–1985), South African anti-apartheid activist
