= Shekhinah (disambiguation) =

Shekinah may refer to:

- Shekhinah, the Hebrew word for God's presence in the world of Earth.
- Shekhina, a book of poetry by Leonard Nimoy and Donald Kuspit
- Shekhinah (singer), South African singer
