= Let You Know =

Let You Know may refer to:

- "Let You Know" (Flume song), released in 2019
- "Let You Know" (Hoobastank song), released in 2001
- "Let You Know" (Sketchy Bongo and Shekhinah song), released in 2016
- "Let You Know", a song by Doodie Lo, released in 2018
- "Let You Know", an unreleased song by SZA

== See also ==
- "Did I Let You Know", a 2011 song by the Red Hot Chili Peppers
- "I'll Let You Know When I Get There", a 2011 episode of the American TV series The Killing
- Just to Let You Know..., 1993 debut album by Bitty McLean
- Things I Should Let You Know, 2013 album by Seth Glier
