= The Gehn Gehn Album =

Studio album by Orezi
- Released: 9 September 2015
- Recorded: 2011–15
- Genres: Afrobeats; highlife; pop
- Length: 75:22
- Label: Sprisal
- Producers: Kiddominant; Mystro; Dr. Amir; Dapiano; Ex-O

Orezi chronology
I No Fit Lie (2009)	The Gehn Gehn Album (2015)	Chocolate Daddy (2023)

Singles from The Gehn Gehn Album
- 1. "Rihanna" Released: 18 February 2013; 2. "Maserati" Released: 14 October 2013; 3. "Zarokome" Released: 15 November 2013; 4. "Shoki" Released: 28 March 2014; 5. "Shuperu (remix)" Released: 29 April 2015; 6. "Baby Abeg" Released: 22 September 2015; 7. "Double Your Hustle" Released: 29 October 2015; 8. "Yagolono" Released: 29 January 2016; 9. "Sweet Yarinya" Released: 12 February 2016

The Gehn Gehn Album is the debut solo studio album by Nigerian singer Orezi. It was released by Sprisal Entertainment on 9 September 2015. The album features guest appearances from Flavour, M.I, Davido, Wizkid, Timaya, 9ice, Ice Prince, and Kiddominant. Its production was mostly handled by Kiddominant, with Orezi enlisting producers such as Mystro, Dr. Amir, Dapiano, and Ex-O. The Gehn Gehn Album spawned the singles "Rihanna", "Maserati", "Zarokome", "Shoki", "Shuperu (Remix)", "Baby Abeg", "Double Your Hustle", "Yagolono", and "Sweet Yarinya".

== Background ==
Orezi announced an album titled MasterPiece to be released in November 2014, but it didn't happen. He initially announced The Gehn Gehn Album's release for the 1st of September but it was then delayed to the 9th.

== Singles ==
The album's lead single "Rihanna" was released on 18 February 2013. Its release was originally meant to coincide with Valentine's Day but was postponed to honor Goldie Harvey's death. The Kiddominant-produced single earned a nomination for Best Reggae/Dancehall Single at The Headies 2013. Its music video was released on 6 September 2013. It was shot and directed in South Africa by Nic Roux of Molotov Cocktail. The reported cost was approximately ₦7.3 million. The music video for "Rihanna" peaked at number 1 on the Pulse Nigeria music video chart and won Best Dancehall/Reggae Video at the 2013 Nigeria Music Video Awards. The song also received a nomination for Most Gifted Ragga Dancehall at the 2014 Channel O Music Video Awards.

The album's second single "Maserati" features vocals and production from Kiddominant, and was released on 14 October 2013; the song's composition draws influence from Fela Kuti. On 15 November 2013, Orezi released the singles "You Garrit" (produced by Del B) and "Zarokome" (produced by Kiddominant). "Zarokome" was released as the third single off The Gehn Gehn Album. "Shoki" was released on 28 March 2014 as The Gehn Gehn Album's fourth single, around the same time as Lil Kesh's version. The song is a freestyle produced by Popito meant to promote the shoki dance. In an interview with Encomium, he recalled first seeing the dance at Fela Kuti's Afrika Shrine after returning from South Africa to shoot the "You Garrit" music video, and drawing inspiration to record the track soon after with Popito. "Shoki" became one of the biggest songs of 2014, leading Orezi to release a French version of it in September 2014. The Tosin Igho-directed music video for "Shoki" takes place in Orezi's hometown, Oke-Ira, Ogba, and stars cameos from dancer Kaffy, comedian Omo Jesu, and fellow Nigerian singer Harrysong.

Orezi's 2014 single "Shuperu" earned a remix with Davido on 29 April 2015 and was released as the album's fifth single. Its accompanying music video was directed by Paul Gambit and was released on 1 May 2015. The Dr. Amir-produced sixth single "Baby Abeg" was released on 22 September 2015. The music video which was shot in Johannesburg features Orezi portraying a Zulu prince courting his love interest. "Double Your Hustle" was officially released as The Gehn Gehn Album's seventh single on 29 October 2015. The music video for "Double Your Hustle", released on 6 April 2016, was directed by Paul Gambit with cameo appearances from Kiddominant, Uti Nwachukwu, Tunde Ednut, Skibii, Sexy Steel, Solidstar, Harrysong and Kcee. "Yagolono" and "Sweet Yarinya" were released as the album's eighth and ninth singles on 27 January and 12 February 2016 respectively.

== Critical reception ==
Joey Akan of Pulse Nigeria noted that The Gehn Gehn Album showcased Orezi's versatility and ability to craft vibrant, dance-ready pop, even if it sometimes felt more like a patchwork than a cohesive project. He concluded that "It's The Ghen Ghen album and Orezi is doing what he wants. And, this time, others will want it too", giving it a rating of 3.0. Oris Aigbokhaevbolo for online music magazine Music in Africa wrote that while the album delivered consistently strong pop production and high-profile collaborations, it lacked a clear artistic identity, leaving Orezi overshadowed by his own songs and features. He concluded that "The Gehn Gehn Album will excel on radio and in the clubs. As for Orezi himself, he'll just have to come to terms with his own anonymity." Wilfred Okiche, reviewing for the website 360nobs, felt that The Gehn Gehn Album balanced strong production with typical flaws of Nigerian debuts, noting standout chemistry between Orezi and Kiddominant but also filler tracks and uninspired writing. He concluded that the record "announces the arrival of a hit making talent and forces a seat at the table for Alhaji Orezi... Maybe he will get better with time. Maybe he won't. But for now this will have to do."

== Track listing ==
The Gehn Gehn Album track listing
No.	Title	Writer(s)	Producer(s)	Length
1.	"Asiko"	Esegine Allen	Kiddominant	4:08
2.	"Maserati" (featuring Kiddominant)	Allen; Ayoola Agboola	Kiddominant	3:44
3.	"Shuperu (remix)" (featuring Davido)	Allen; David Adeleke	Popito	3:35
4.	"Low Low"	Allen	Mystro	3:15
5.	"Double Your Hustle"	Allen	Kiddominant	3:09
6.	"How Long"	Allen	Kiddominant	3:37
7.	"Big Something" (featuring Flavour and M.I)	Allen; Chinedu Okoli; Jude Abaga	Popito	3:38
8.	"Baby Abeg"	Allen	Dr. Amir	3:10
9.	"Under the Blanket"	Allen	Dapiano	3:31
10.	"Ogede" (featuring Wizkid and Timaya)	Allen; Ayodeji Balogun; Inetimi Odon	Kiddominant	3:27
11.	"Selfie With You"	Allen	Ex-O	3:49
12.	"Sweet Yarinya"	Allen	Dr. Amir	4:05
13.	"Yagolono"	Allen	Popito	3:30
14.	"Mr. Officer"	Allen	Kiddominant	3:16
15.	"Shoki"	Allen	Popito	3:28
16.	"Dencinambari"	Allen	Kiddominant	3:28
17.	"Jesus Pikin" (featuring Ice Prince)	Allen; Panshak Zamani	Popito	3:29
18.	"Roma"	Allen	Kiddominant	3:22
19.	"Da Party Ru" (featuring 9ice)	Allen; Alexander Akande	Dapiano	3:55
20.	"Zarokome"	Allen	Kiddominant	3:55

Bonus tracks
No.	Title	Writer(s)	Producer(s)	Length
21.	"Rihanna"	Allen	Kiddominant	3:53
Total length:				75:22

== Personnel ==
Credits adapted from back cover.

- Popito – production (tracks 1, 3, 7, 13, 15, 17)
- Kiddominant – production (tracks 2, 5, 6, 10, 13, 14, 16, 18, 20)
- Mystro – production (track 4)
- Dr. Amir – production (tracks 8, 12)
- Dapiano – production (tracks 9, 19)
- Ex-O – production (track 11), mixing, mastering (tracks 2, 6, 11, 15, 16, 17, 20)
- Suka Sounds – mixing, mastering (tracks 1, 3, 9, 12, 13, 18, 19)
- Foster Zeeno – mixing, mastering (tracks 4, 7, 8, 14)
- Sheyman – mixing, mastering (tracks 5, 10)
- Fiokee – guitar (tracks 10, 13, 20)
- Mikifa – guitar (track 5)

== Release history ==
Release history and formats for The Gehn Gehn Album
Region	Date	Format	Label
Various	9 September 2015	CD; digital download	Sprisal
