= Suited =

Single by Shekhinah

from the album Rose Gold
- Released: 14 July 2017
- Recorded: 2017
- Genre: Pop
- Length: 3:53
- Label: SME Africa; Columbia
- Songwriters: Shekhinah Thandi Donnell; Luke Goliath; Themba Sonnyboy Sekowe
- Producers: Luke Goliath; DJ Maphorisa; Shekhinah

Shekhinah singles chronology
"Breathing" (2017)	"Suited" (2017)	"Deme (Coke Studio Africa)" (2017)

Music video
- "Suited" on YouTube

"Suited" is a single by South African singer-songwriter Shekhinah. It was released on 14 July 2017 by Columbia Records and SME Africa as the first single from her debut studio album Rose Gold (2017). The song was produced by Luke Goliath with assistance from DJ Maphorisa and Shekhinah. It was certified Diamond in South Africa by the Recording Industry of South Africa (RiSA).

== Recording and background ==
"Suited" was produced by Lwandle Mchunu and Naledi Maphumulo, a record producer from Port Elizabeth who got the opportunity to work with Shekhinah after he put together a beat and gave former Idols South Africa contestant Loyiso Gijana a listen who then who put Goliath in contact with Shekhinah. After recording the vocals for the song, Shekhinah was contacted by South African record producer and disc jockey DJ Maphorisa, who added his touch to the song. Shekhinah describes the song as lighthearted with a vibe and many emotions and felt Suited is the most relatable song on her album which is a far cry from the songs that she has dropped in the past, which were mainly about relationships that went bad.

Shekhinah speaking on the song:

I would love to ease my audience into my new album, I don’t want to stretch too far from my usual sound. I used bongo drums in the track which I know my fans will relate to and instantly recognise. When I was working on the track I imagined it fitting snuggly into people’s intimate spaces. I could hear the song playing in many kitchens on a sunny afternoon as lovers prepare their favourite meal. I could see soul mates gleaming with joy as they remembered what they were doing the first time they heard it and how they felt.

== Music video ==
The music video for the single was released on Shekhinah's Vevo account on 17 August 2017. It was directed by Nate Thomas and has garnered over 10 million views on YouTube, and it features her boyfriend.

== Remixes and samples ==
Shekhinah released a remix of "Suited" on 13 Apr 2018 which features Nigerian singer and songwriter, Mr Eazi. The song's remix is produced by afrobeats producer Synx. The music video for the song's remix was released on Shekhinah's Vevo account on 6 Sep 2018.

== Charts ==
Chart (2017)	Peak position
South Africa (EMA)	1

== Accolades ==
At annual 24th South African Music Awards, "Suited" was nominated for Record of the Year.

Year	Nominee / work	Award	Result
2018	"Suited"	Record of the Year	Nominated

== Certifications ==
Region	Certification	Certified units/sales
South Africa (RISA)	10× Platinum	400,000
