= Rihanna (Orezi song) =

Single by Orezi

from the album The Gehn Gehn Album
- Released: February 18, 2013
- Recorded: 2013
- Genre: Afropop; dancehall
- Length: 3:56
- Label: Culbeed Music; Sprisal Entertainment
- Songwriter: Esegine Allen
- Producer: Kiddominant

Orezi singles chronology
"What is the Need" (2012)	"Rihanna" (2013)	"Maserati" (2013)

Music video
- "Rihanna" on YouTube

"Rihanna" is a song by Nigerian singer Orezi. It was produced by Kiddominant and released on February 18, 2013. Orezi recorded "Rihanna" while signed to Culbeed Music. The music video for "Rihanna" peaked at number 1 on the Pulse Nigeria music video chart. Orezi recorded the video after signing with Sprisal Entertainment, a record label owned by Jibola Fatgbems.

== Music video background ==
The music video for "Rihanna" was filmed in South Africa. The song was initially scheduled for release on Valentine's Day, but was pushed back due to Goldie Harvey's death. Orezi told Showtime Celebrity he decided to feature a Rihanna look-alike in the music video after all efforts to get the Barbadian singer proved unsuccessful. Orezi's management was able to get a Mauritian girl named Kim to play Rihanna in the video. Orezi also told Showtime Celebrity he shot the "Rihanna" video in South Africa in order to achieve something different. It was alleged that Orezi's management spent over ₦7.3 million on the video shoot.

In June 2014, the music video for "Rihanna" made YouTube Nation's compiled list of the "8 Incredible Music Videos from Around the World".

== Accolades ==
"Rihanna" was nominated for Best Reggae/Dancehall Single at the 2013 edition of The Headies. The music video for "Rihanna" won Best Dance Hall/Reggae Video at the 2013 Nigeria Music Video Awards. Moreover, it was nominated for Most Gifted Ragga Dancehall at the 2014 Channel O Music Video Awards.

== Track listing and cover ==
Digital singles

No.	Title	Writer(s)	Producer(s)	Length
1.	"Rihanna"	Esegine Orezi Allen	Kiddominant	3:56
2.	"Rihanna (Orezi Cover)"	Orezi	Coldflames	3:56
