= Orezi =

Nigerian musician

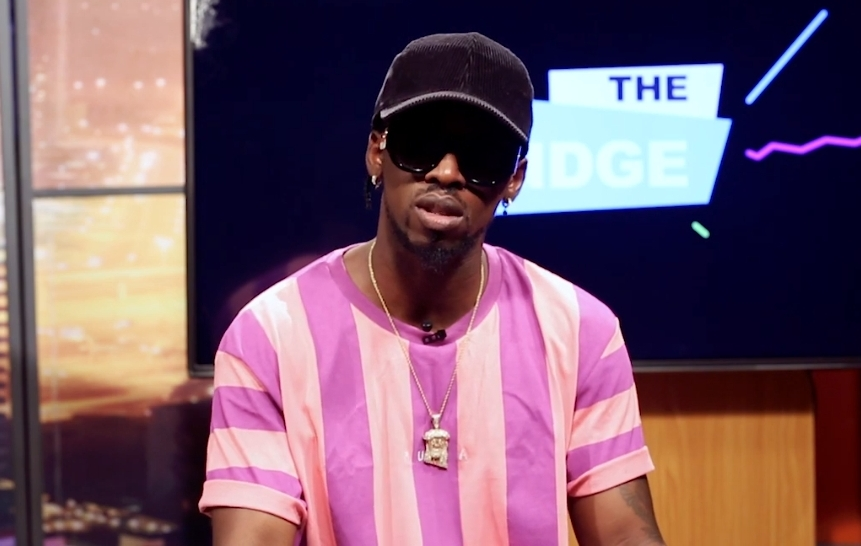

Background information
- Also known as: Dat GehnGehn Guy, OZ Jones
- Born: Esegine Orezi Allen; 28 March 1986 (age 40); Owhelogbo, Isoko, Delta State, Nigeria
- Genres: Afrobeats
- Occupations: Singer; songwriter
- Years active: 2009–present
- Labels: Culbeed Music; Sprisal Entertainment
- Website: iamorezi.com

Esegine Allen (born 28 March 1986), better known by his stage name Orezi, is a Nigerian musician from Delta State. He rose to prominence with his song "Rihanna" in 2013.

In a chat with Showtime's The Cooking Pot the singer said that in the Nigerian music industry, having talent without money is a waste of time.

== Early life and education ==
Esegine "Orezi" Allen was born and raised in Owhelogbo, Isoko, Delta State. He is the first born of five children. Orezi attended the Command Secondary School in Abakaliki. He graduated from the University of Lagos and completed the mandatory one-year NYSC program.

== Music career ==
Orezi began his music career in early 2009. He has worked with several producers, including Kiddominant, Del B and Dokta Frabz. Orezi's debut song "I No Fit Lie" became Radio Continental's theme song. He headlined a show named after the song; the show was organised by the Continental Broadcasting Services (CBS). The music video for "I No Fit Lie" was shot in South Africa. In 2010, Orezi released the single "High B.P". The music video for the song was endorsed by MTV Base. In late 2010, he released the DJ JamJam-assisted track "Jamilaya".

In early 2011, Orezi was featured on "Emoti" alongside Danagog, Igho and DJ Debby. The song was played on Trace TV, MTV Base, Soundcity and One Music. He was also featured on Jatt's single "Komije" alongside Sauce Kid, Muna and Igho. Orezi released the music video for the song "Booty Bounce"; it features cameo appearances from Karen Igho, Bovi, Wande Coal, Kay Switch, Sina Rambo, Vina, Danagog, Skuki and General Pype, among others. For several weeks, "Booty Bounce" was one of the top ten African songs on Trace Urban, Channel O and MTV. The music video for "Booty Bounce" was nominated for Most Gifted Reggae Video of the Year at the 2012 Channel O Music Video Awards.

In 2010, Orezi performed during Star Music Trek's visit to Kaduna and Makurdi, and also performed at an event celebrating Nigeria's 50th Independence Day. In early 2011, Orezi performed at DJ Jimmy Jatt's "Jump Off" show held at the Get Arena in Lekki. He has performed in several club tours in Nigeria and South Africa. He was part of the Emoti Tour organized by DJ Debby. Orezi performed at Club Inc in South Africa. In 2012, he performed at the Rhythm Unplugged concert in Ibadan, and toured with Trace Urban and St. Remy.

Orezi released the single "You Garrit" in November 2013; the song's music video was released in September 2014. On 27 March 2014, Orezi released "Shoki" as the fourth single off his debut studio album The Gehn Gehn Album (2015). Orezi said the inspiration for "Shoki" came after he returned from South Africa, went to the Afrika Shrine, and saw people doing the Shoki dance. He asked about the dance, learned its name, and later, while in the studio with producer Popito (who had sent him a beat), he created the song around it. Orezi admitted he did not know the meaning of “Shoki”, only that it was the name of the dance. He clarified that he did not invent the dance, which he said originated from Agege or somewhere else, and that it already existed before his song. Orezi said his and Lil Kesh’s versions of “Shoki” were released around the same time, with Lil Kesh’s version appearing online slightly earlier. He acknowledged that many other artists recorded “Shoki” songs (more than three versions existed), but suggested that his gained more attention because he was already a recognized artist. In March 2014, Orezi released the French version of his single "Shoki". On 15 December 2014, Orezi released a four-track EP for the different versions of "Shoki". Orezi released his debut album The Ghen Ghen Album in September 2015. It features collaborations with 9ice, Davido, Flavour, Ice Prince, M.I Abaga, Timaya and Wizkid. Pulse Nigeria awarded the album 3 stars out of 5. In November 2015, Orezi released the music video for his single "Ogede" featuring Wizkid and Timaya. The music video was directed by Paul Gambit. In September 2016, he released the controversial single "Call the Police".

== Awards ==
Year	Award	Category	Result
2014	2014 Nigeria Entertainment Awards	Best New Act of the Year	Nominated
2014	City People Entertainment Awards	Dancehall/Reggae Act of the Year	Nominated
2013	NMVA (Nigerian Music Video Awards)	Best Reggae Dancehall Artiste	Won
2013	SSMA. (South South Music Awards)	Best Reggae Dancehall Artiste	Won
2013	The Headies	Best Reggae Dancehall Song	Nominated
2013	AMMA Award (Abuja Meritorious Music Awards)	Best Club Banger	Won
2013	The Prestigious ChannelO Music Video Awards	Reggae Dancehall	Nominated
2013	UNILAG Awards	Best New Act	Won

== Discography ==
=== Albums and EPs ===
- I No Fit Lie (EP) (2010)
- The Ghen Ghen Album (2015)

=== Singles (partial) ===
- "Jamilaya" (featuring DJ Jam-Jam) (2010)
- "Rihanna" (2013)
- "Booty Bounce"
- "What Is the Need"
- "You Garrit"
- "Shoki"
- "Onome" (featuring DJ Akaba)
- "Shuperu"
- "Shuperu (Remix)" (featuring Davido)
- "Yagolono" (2016)
- "Sweet Yarinya"
- "My Queen" (2019)
- "Your Body" featuring Teni (2020)
