= A Good Time =

Studio album by Davido
- Released: November 22, 2019
- Genre: Afropop
- Length: 60:00
- Labels: DMW; RCA; Sony
- Producers: Shizzi; Speroach Beatz; Tekno; Kiddominant; P2J; London on da Track; Fresh VDM; Seyi; Teekay Witty; Ray Keys; Vstix

Davido chronology
Son of Mercy (2016)	A Good Time (2019)	A Better Time (2020)

Singles from A Good Time
- 1. "If" Released: February 17, 2017; 2. "Fall" Released: June 2, 2017; 3. "Assurance" Released: April 30, 2018; 4. "Blow My Mind" Released: July 26, 2019; 5. "Risky" Released: October 23, 2019

A Good Time is the second studio album by Nigerian singer Davido. It was released on November 22, 2019, via Davido Music Worldwide, RCA Records and Sony Music. The album features guest appearances from Chris Brown, Summer Walker, Gunna, A Boogie wit da Hoodie, Dremo, Peruzzi, Popcaan, Zlatan, Yonda, Wurld and Naira Marley. Its production was handled by Speroach Beatz, Tekno, Shizzi, Kiddominant, P2J, London on da Track, and Fresh VDM, among others. A Good Time was supported by the singles "If", "Fall", "Assurance", "Blow My Mind", and "Risky". To promote the album, Davido announced plans to embark on a North American tour, which was scheduled to begin in the winter and end in 2020. However, the tour was postponed due to the COVID-19 pandemic.

== Background and promotion ==
Davido recorded A Good Time in Atlanta and told Vibe magazine he wanted to make music in a new environment. He labeled the album an Afrobeats project and said it would incorporate other musical styles. Davido disclosed the album's title during an event held in Lagos in September 2019, and said the record would be released the following month. He also unveiled snippets of four songs from the album during the event. Following his performance at Powerhouse 2019, Davido told Power 105.1's DJ Self that the album will feature collaborations with A Boogie wit da Hoodie, Summer Walker, Gunna, and Chris Brown, among others. A Good Time was produced entirely by Nigerian producers, except for one track. The cover art features images of Davido and his father, and a sculpture of his late mother.

=== "If", "Fall", and "Assurance" ===
The album's lead single, "If", was released on February 17, 2017. The song was produced by Tekno, who supposedly ghost wrote it for Davido. "If" was certified diamond by the Recording Industry of South Africa, indicating shipments of 200,000 units. It won Best Pop Single and Song of the Year at The Headies 2018. Reviewing for OkayAfrica, Sabo Kpade described the song as a "slow burner" with an "unfussy beat that sounds hollowed out and isn't cluttered with instruments". The music video for "If" was produced by Tunde Babalola and directed by Director Q, who filmed it in London. Davido teamed up with menswear designer Orange Culture to release a capsule collection inspired by "If".

The album's second single, "Fall", was released on June 2, 2017. The song samples a line from Kojo Funds's "Dun Talking" and was certified platinum by the Recording Industry of South Africa. "Fall" was one of the top-100-most-Shazam-searched singles in America in January 2019, and was a top-10 record on Shazam in New York. In February 2019, it became the longest charting Nigerian pop song in Billboard history. "Fall" was ranked at number 163 on Pitchfork's list of the 200 Best Songs of the 2010s. The accompanying music video for "Fall" was directed by British video director Daps. In December 2018, the video surpassed 100 million views, becoming the most viewed video by a Nigerian artist on YouTube at the time. The Speroach Beatz-produced track "Assurance" was released on April 30, 2018, as the album's third single. The song was described as a love track and samples the phrase "Biggie Biggie", which was popularized by Osita Iheme. Davido dedicated "Assurance" to his girlfriend and released it to coincide with her 23rd birthday. Speroach Beatz claimed in an interview with Konbini Channels that Davido spent half an hour recording the song, while he created the beat in an hour. Reviewing for Native magazine, Toye Sokunbi said the song "speaks volumes for the importance of clarity in the age of emojis, validation from our loved ones and putting love first, against all odds". The accompanying music video for "Assurance" was directed by Meji Alabi.

=== "Blow My Mind", "Risky", "Sweet in the Middle", "1 Milli", and "D&G" ===
The Chris Brown-assisted track "Blow My Mind" was released on July 26, 2019, as the album's fourth single. Produced by Shizzi, the song was initially intended to be released as the album's lead single. Musically, "Blow My Mind" contains lyrics pertaining to a girl who simply blows Davido's mind. In the Edgar Esteves-directed visuals for "Blow My Mind", Davido and Chris Brown spend quality time in a motel with their significant other. The video became the fastest Nigerian music video to reach one million views in 11 hours, surpassing the records of Wizkid's "Fever" and "Come Closer". It also became the Nigerian music video with the highest number of views within the first 24 hours of its release. The album's fifth single, "Risky", was released on October 23, 2019. It features guest vocals by Jamaican singer Popcaan, who previously enlisted Davido to appear on his 2018 single "Dun Rich". The video for "Risky" was directed by Meji Alabi and pays homage to the crime drama series Top Boy. In the video, a female member of Davido's and Popcaan's crew informs them to police. On December 19, 2019, Davido released the Meji Alabi-directed music video for "Sweet in the Middle", which features clips of an arid Lagos landscape and post-apocalyptic scenes that are reminiscent of Mad Max films.

On March 3, 2020, Davido released the video for "1 Milli", which was recorded by Director K. The video depicts a wedding celebration between him and his love interest, and contains a ceremonial scene of a middle-aged woman who rides a horseback while dressed in a traditional attire. The video was criticized for bearing a striking resemblance to Entitled, a 2018 short film created by Nigerian-British filmmaker Adeyemi Michael. Director K clarified on Instagram that he was inspired by Michael's work and wanted to "recreate the iconic shot of Michael's mother on horseback". On April 23, 2020, Davido released the Daps-directed music video for "D&G". In it, he and Summer Walker are decked from head-to-toe in Dolce & Gabbana clothing. The video was filmed in Los Angeles while Davido was on his North American tour. Davido told CNN that all proceeds from the "D&G" video will support the Dolce & Gabbana and Humanitas Together for Coronavirus Research Fund.

== Critical reception ==
Professional ratings
Review scores
Source	Rating
The Guardian	3/5 stars
Pitchfork	8.3/10
TooXclusive	7/10
Pulse Nigeria	6.6/10
Jaguda	6/10

Tara Joshi of The Guardian awarded the album 3 stars out of 5, commending Davido for offering a "broader array of sonic palettes". Joshi also wrote that the album "can drift into sunshine-infused listlessness, but it's rescued by Davido's undeniable charisma and intricate understanding of warm, uplifting pop instrumentation". Pitchfork's Sheldon Pearce granted the album an 8.3 rating out of 10, describing it as a "buoyant, unsinkable record" and applauding Davido for providing "not just an integrated sound all his own but a clear vision for its future".

The Native's Toye Sokunbi said that from a sonic standpoint, the album "emblemises Davido's resolute Africa-first creative gaze while expending a wide-range of collaborators as homage to afropop's expansive inspirations and influences". Also reviewing for The Native, Debola Abimbolu said A Good Time relieved Davido from the "pressure of delivering songs that instantly resonate as club bangers". Moreover, Abimbolu opined that all five singles "lose some of their gloss when they all run together and are padded out with different versions of the same piano-heavy afropop beat".

In a mixed review for Pulse Nigeria, Motolani Alake said the album didn't have "multiple groundbreaking and mind-blowing songs" despite being cohesive. TooXclusive's Oluwatobi Ibironke rated the album 7 out of 10, echoing similar sentiments made by Alake. Jaguda's Arthur Shur gave the album a rating of 6 out of 10, describing the listening experience as "a physics wave motion". Shur also said the album is "average" when previously released singles are omitted.

== Track listing ==
Credits adapted from The Native magazine and the website Modern Ghana.

No.	Title	Writer(s)	Producer(s)	Length
1.	"Intro"	David Adeleke; Abayomi Adeniran; Ayoola Agboola	Kiddominant	3:23
2.	"1 Milli"	Adekunle Kosoko; Adeleke	Seyi	2:43
3.	"Check Am"	Adeleke	Teekay Witty	3:14
4.	"Disturbance" (featuring Peruzzi)	Adeleke; Tobechukwu Okoh	Speroach Beatz	3:39
5.	"If"	Adeleke; Tekno	Tekno	3:57
6.	"D&G" (featuring Summer Walker)	Agboola; Nija Charles; Sindiswe Magoso; Tolulope Agboola	Kiddominant; London on da Track	2:52
7.	"Get to You"	Kelvin Johnson; Richard Isong	P2J	3:46
8.	"Risky" (featuring Popcaan)	Andre Sutherland; Okoh	Speroach Beatz	4:30
9.	"Sweet in the Middle" (featuring Naira Marley, Zlatan and Wurld)	Adeleke; Azeez Fashola; Omoniyi Raphael; Sadiq Onifade	Shizzi	4:08
10.	"Fall"	Adeleke; Agboola	Kiddominant	4:00
11.	"Green Light Riddim"	Adeboye Folarin; Boash Charles Ifeanyi	Shizzi	2:52
12.	"Big Picture" (featuring Gunna, Dremo and A Boogie)	Sergio Kitchens; Raymond Aboriomoh; Artist Dubose	Ray Keys	4:08
13.	"One Thing"	Adeleke; Agboola	Kiddominant	3:19
14.	"Assurance"	Adeleke	Speroach Beatz	4:09
15.	"Blow My Mind" (featuring Chris Brown)	Adeleke; Onifade; Christopher Brown	Shizzi	3:19
16.	"Company"	Abayomi Adeniran	Vstix	2:47
17.	"Animashaun" (featuring Yonda)	Adeleke; Adeniran	Fresh VDM	3:40
Total length:				60:00

Notes

- "If" samples lyrics from Lagbaja's "Gra Gra", a song from the album WE (2000).

== Charts ==
Chart performance for A Good Time
Chart (2019)	Peak position
US World Albums (Billboard)	6
US Heatseekers Albums (Billboard)	7

== Certifications ==
Region	Certification	Certified units/sales
South Africa (RISA)	2× Platinum	60,000^{‡}
^{‡} Sales+streaming figures based on certification alone.

== Release history ==
Region	Date	Format	Label
Various	November 22, 2019	CD; digital download; streaming	DMW; RCA; Sony
