= Yellow (Shane Eagle album) =

Studio album by Shane Eagle
- Released: 31 August 2017
- Recorded: 2015–2017
- Genre: Hip hop
- Label: Eagle Entertainment
- Producer: Shane Hughes (Executive producer) Vaughan Thiel (also exec.) Andile Khumalo (Co-Executive producer) Choolwe Munyati Samson Sibanda Thabang Mabasa Keith Wanjiru

Shane Eagle chronology
| Yellow (2017) | Never Grow Up. - EP (2018) |

Alternative cover

Singles from Yellow
- 1. "Let It Flow" Released: August 31, 2017; 2. "Need Me (feat. KLY)" Released: August 31, 2017

Yellow is the debut studio album by South African rapper Shane Eagle, released on 31 August 2017 by Eagle Entertainment.

== Background and promotion ==
Eagle took to Twitter and Instagram that he wanted the album to achieve gold status. He released hard copies of the album with a bonus track titled "75". He started promoting the hashtag #20KOutTheTrunk to inform fans of the various locations he will be across the country. On October 5, 2017, he began the #20KOutTheTrunk campaign in Pretoria, South Africa. Production was mainly handled by Hughes and longtime friend Andile Khumalo, a.k.a. Shooter Khumz, with the assistance of in-house producers, Taybeats and SP Dubb.

== Awards and nominations ==
| Year | Award ceremony | Category | Recipient/Nominated work | Results | Ref. |
|---|---|---|---|---|---|
| 2018 | South African Music Awards | Best Hip Hop Album | Yellow | Won | |
| 2018 | South African Music Awards | Newcomer of the Year | Yellow | Nominated | |
| 2018 | South African Music Awards | Album of the Year | Yellow | Nominated | |

== Track listing ==
| No. | Title | Writer(s) | Length |
|---|---|---|---|
| 1. | "Yellow" | Shane Eagle, Andile "Shooter Khumz" Khumalo | 2:39 |
| 2. | "Intro" | Hughes, Khumalo | 2:50 |
| 3. | "Strange" | Hughes, Samson "Taybeats Sibanda | 3:24 |
| 4. | "Can you see" | Hughes, Sibanda | 3:16 |
| 5. | "Need Me" (featuring KLY) | Hughes, Siyabonga "KLY" Mkhize, Khumalo | 4:16 |
| 6. | "Privacy (Interlude)" | Hughes, Khumalo | 2:17 |
| 7. | "On My Own" | Hughes, Khumalo, Choolwe "Wichi1080" Munyati | 3:17 |
| 8. | "Let It Flow" | Hughes, Khumalo | 3:17 |
| 9. | "Aliens x Convos with God" | Hughes, Khumalo | 7:08 |
| 10. | "MIHI" | Hughes, Khumalo | 3:02 |
| 11. | "WINTER" | Hughes, Thabang "SP Dubb" Mabasa | 3:52 |
| 12. | "75" | Hughes, Keith "KK Tha 1st" Wanjiru | 3:57 |
| 13. | "DNGO" | Hughes, Khumalo | 3:20 |
| 14. | "Empty Highways" | Hughes, Khumalo | 3:19 |
