= Deshnie Govender =

South African DJ (born 1969)

- Born: Deshnie Govender; 5 April 1985 (age 41); Durban, South Africa
- Origin: Durban
- Genres: electro house, hip hop
- Occupations: DJ, songwriter, actress, Social media personality, Businessperson; marketing specialist
- Years active: 2007–present
- Label: Independent
- Website: thatdesh.com

Deshnie Govender (born 5 April 1985), also known as DJ Roxxi, is a South African Indian creator, influencer, DJ, and record producer.

Govender made her debut in the South African music scene in 2004 as one of the first South African Indian female Djs and producers and went on to win a Global Spin Award in 2011.

== Early life and education ==
Deshnie Govender was born in Isipingo, Durban, South Africa to a family of Indian descent. She spent her childhood in Isipingo and then moved to Amanzimtoti on the South Coast of Durban.

Although Roxxi first planned to embark on a music career straight after high school, she ultimately chose to attend secondary education first, as it was frowned upon in the Indian community for a young girl to become a club DJ. Roxxi enrolled in Natal University to study towards an LL.B. (law) Degree, studying journalism in her second year. Towards the end of 2003, Roxxi dropped out of her course. During this break she discovered her musical talents while working part-time at her mother's nightclub in Amanzimtoti.

== Career ==
During her first year at the University of KwaZulu-Natal, Govender left her LLB studies due to her father's demise and stepped into the family liquor business. Her childhood interest in DJing, particularly remix tracks, found an outlet when her mother bought a nightclub.

After a two-year stint mastering R&B and Bhangra music, her career gained momentum through a radio interview. Her music style evolved from Bhangra to house, to expand to wider audiences.

Following her belief in the power of good music, Govender's popularity grew, and she started headlining some of 5FM's major gigs. Her career peaked in 2009 when she headlined the 5FM Vodacom Durban July after-party and toured with the Rage Fest in Umhlanga, performing alongside notable artists.

In 2009, Govender teamed with Nic Billington to release her debut single "Away". The track features Nic Billington on vocals and was produced by Craig Massiv from Flash Republic fame.

In November 2012, at the first Global Spin Awards held in New York, Govender was recognized as the Best DJ in the Africa category. Global Spin Awards are known as the DJ Grammys.

In 2014, Govender released a new single 'Musica Na Alma' featuring Weza Solange, Lection and Beatmachine.

In 2015, Govender worked with artists Nadia Nakai, Reason, and Yung Swiss to produce the single "Like Whoo".

In 2020 Govender released a podcast, Influence Insider, which was produced by Digi Hype.

Govender transitioned into digital marketing in 2015 and now works for TikTok, heading up marketing for Sub-Saharan Africa. She previously worked as the head of Channel of Influence at ABinBev Draftline.

=== Debut single ===
In 2009, DJ Roxxi decided to embark on a new venture. She teamed up with a longtime friend and fellow artist Nic Billington and penned a track entitled "Away". The track features Nic Billington on vocals and was produced by Craig Massiv of Flash Republic fame.

== Awards and recognition ==
- 2006: Cosmopolitan Magazine Awesome Women Awards
- 2007: Standard Bank Women of KZN Rising Star
- 2011: Global Spin Awards
