= Fem (song) =

2020 single by Davido

"FEM"

Single by Davido

from the album A Better Time
- Released: 11 September 2020
- Genre: Street Music; Afrobeats
- Length: 3:22
- Label: DMW; Sony Music; RCA
- Songwriter: David Adedeji Adeleke
- Producer: Napji

Davido singles chronology
| "Jowo" (2020) | "FEM" (2020) | "The Best" (2021) |

Music video
- "FEM" on YouTube

"FEM" is a song by Nigerian singer Davido, released on 11 September 2020 as the first single from his third studio album A Better Time (2020). The song was produced by Nigerian record producer Napji. It peaked at number two on TurnTable Top 50 chart. As of October 2020, "FEM" received 1.3 million streams on Boomplay.

== Background ==
In July 2020, Davido announced his then-upcoming third studio album A Better Time, via Twitter. "FEM" was released on 11 September 2020, two months after he announced the release of his third studio album. The production was handled by Napji. Then mixing and engineering were handled by Dremo and STG.

== Music video ==
On 10 September 2020, Davido released the music video for "FEM", under Concord Music Publishing. The visual sees Davido with bouncers all of the street of Lagos and seen dancing with girls. The visual was directed by Dammy Twitch. The music video reached 32 million views on YouTube, as of December 2023.

== Commercial performance ==
The song debuted at number one on the Billboard U.S. Afrobeats Songs chart, and number 13 on the Billboard World Digital Song Sales.

== Credits and personnel ==
Credits adapted from Genius.

- Davido – vocals, songwriting
- Napji – production
- Dremo – mixing
- STG – mixing assistance
- STG – mastering

== Charts ==
| Chart (2022) | Peak position |
|---|---|
| Nigeria (TurnTable Top 50) | 2 |
| Top Triller Global (Billboard) | 3 |
| Top 50 Streaming Songs (TurnTable) | 1 |
| Top Triller chart Nigeria (TurnTable) | 3 |
| TurnTable Top 50 Airplay (TurnTable) | 40 |
| UK Afrobeats (OCC) | 3 |

== Release history ==
| Region | Date | Format | Label | Ref. |
|---|---|---|---|---|
| Various | 11 September 2020 | Digital download; streaming | DMW | |
