= Heroes of Tomorrow =

- Official cover art.

EP by Frank Casino
- Released: 9 November 2018
- Genre: Hip hop
- Length: 13:32
- Language: English; Sesotho; Setswana; Sepedi; Zulu language
- Label: Platoon Ltd (on behalf of Globe Field)
- Producer: Dellz; Kenken Killt It; Fourty Eight; Maurice West

Frank Casino chronology
Something From Me (2018)	Heroes of Tomorrow (2018)

Singles from Heroes of Tomorrow
- 1. "Sudden (featuring Cassper Nyovest and Major League DJz)"

Heroes of Tomorrow is the debut extended play (EP) by South African rapper professionally known as Frank Casino. It was released by Platoon through Globe Field on 9 November 2018 as the rapper celebrated his birthday by putting out the project, it features guest appearances from Cassper Nyovest, Major League DJz and Skull-E.

On 9 November 2020, after 2 years of the extended play's release, it was certified gold in South Africa.

== Certification ==
Region	Certification	Certified units/sales
South Africa (RISA)	Gold	10,000^{*}
^{*} Sales figures based on certification alone.
