= Shane Eagle =

South African rapper (born 1996)

- Born: Shane Patrick Hughes; 7 June 1996 (age 30); Rabie Ridge, Johannesburg, South Africa
- Education: Southdowns College
- Occupations: Rapper; singer; songwriter
- Years active: 2009–present
- Awards: Best Hip Hop Album 2016 SAMMA Awards
- Musical career
- Genres: Hip hop
- Instruments: Vocals
- Labels: Eagle Entertainment (current); Feel Good Music (former)

Shane Patrick Hughes (born June 7, 1996), known professionally as Shane Eagle, is a South African rapper and songwriter. He rose to fame in 2015, after finishing fourth place on the first season of the Vuzu rapping reality competition, The Hustle. After releasing several non-album singles, Eagle released his debut album Yellow in 2017, which features the gold-certified lead single, "Let It Flow". In October 2019, Eagle released his debut mixtape, Dark Moon Flower which boasted features from American rappers, Kota the friend, Santi, Caleborate, Dreamville's Lute and Bas along with the English band, The Hics and fellow South African rappers Nasty C and PatrickxxLee.

== Early life ==
Shane Patrick Hughes was born on 7 June 1996, in Rabie Ridge, a suburb of Johannesburg, to a Coloured mother, and an Irish father. After his parents got divorced while he was at the age of five, he went to live with his father in Kempton Park, Johannesburg. However, he continued to visit his mother who still resided in Rabie Ridge on a regular basis.

The term "Eagle" originated from a group of his friends that resided in Rabie Ridge, Johannesburg and thus adopted it as a part of his stage name. As he started rapping in high school, Eagle recorded his first song at the age of 13 at his friend's studio.

== Career ==
=== 2015–2016: Beginnings and breakthrough ===
After finishing high school, Shane Eagle was impassioned to apply for the inaugural season of the Vuzu rapping reality competition, The Hustle, which was scouting artists after making them upload a video while rapping to social media platforms: Instagram or Facebook, in terms of casting them. Eagle applied and was later chosen to compete at the competition. He later finished fourth place after a double elimination of the top-four. Immediately after leaving the competition, Eagle gained his public image and his fan base. On 8 October 2015, he then released his debut single "Way Up" featuring his then-fellow contender and the winner of The Hustle BigStar Johnson under rapper JR's record label, Feel Good Music. The song received favourable airplays on South African radio stations, which include YFM, 5FM and Highveld 947.

In March 2016, Vuzu's entertainment news parody, V Entertainment revealed that Eagle was joining as one of the presenters of the show, including Moozlie, DJ Speedsta and Dash Mkhathini, who all joined long-term presenter of the show Lalla Hirayama. In the first quarter of 2017, the show announced that its taking a break leading Eagle to evacuate from the show before it got revamped. Upon 2016, Eagle released non-album singles, including, "I'm Back", "Cutting Corners" and "Top Floor", which were all released through his independent record label, Eagle Entertainment, established after his departure at Feel Good Music. On 18 June 2016, Eagle was one of the opening acts on the Castle Lite Unlocks concert, headlined by rapper J Cole.

=== 2017–present: Yellow and Never Grow Up ===
Eagle's debut album Yellow, was released on 31 August 2017. Yellow was initially supported by double lead singles: " Let It Flow" and "Need Me" featuring singer KLY, both released on the day of the album. In November 2017, the album reached over one-million streams on the music and video service Apple Music. One of the singles, "Let It Flow", was certified gold status according to the Recording Industry of South Africa in September 2019. The album won for Best Hip Hop Album at the 24th South African Music Awards. Yellow was also nominated for Album of the Year, "Let It Flow" was nominated for Best Music Video, and Eagle was nominated for Newcomer of the Year. On 26 August 2018, Eagle launched his first tour, The Yellow Tour, in supporting his album Yellow. The shows were performed on four cities, kicked off in Cape Town on 31 August 2018.

Never Grow Up, Eagle's first EP after Yellow, was released on 28 December 2018. The EP was certified gold by the Recording Industry of South Africa. It was certified the same time with Yellow lead single "Let It Flow" – also reaching the same status.

In 2021, he released the single "Ammo" featuring YoungstaCPT On August 13, 2021, he released a single "Skydream" featuring Redveil.

== Discography ==
=== Albums ===
Album title	Album details
Yellow	Released: 31 August 2017; Label: Eagle Entertainment; Formats: Digital download
Green	• Released: 18 March 2022 • Label: Eagle Entertainment • Formats: Streaming

=== Mixtapes ===
Album title	Album details
Dark Moon Flower	Released: 15 October 2019; Label: Eagle Entertainment; Formats: Digital download

=== EPs ===
EP title	EP details	Certifications
Never Grow Up	Released: 28 December 2018; Label: Eagle Entertainment; Formats: Digital download	RISA: Gold

=== Singles ===
List of singles as lead artist, showing year released and album name
Year	Title	Certifications	Album
2015	"Way Up" (featuring Big Star Johnson)		Non-album single
2016	"Cutting Corners"		Non-album single
2016	"I'm Back"		Non-album single
2016	"Top Floor" (with Big Star Johnson)		Non-album single
2017	"Let It Flow"	RISA: Gold	Yellow
2017	"Need Me"		Yellow
2017	"Black Rick"		Non-album single
2018	"Gustavo"		Non-album single
2018	"The Moon"		Non-album single
2019	"Ap3x (Remastered)" (featuring Bas (rapper))		Never Grow Up
2019	"Black"		Dark Moon Flower
2019	"Paris" (featuring Nasty C)		Dark Moon Flower
2021	"Ammo" (featuring YoungstaCPT)		Non-album single

=== As featured artist ===
List of singles as featured artist, with certifications, showing year released and album name
Year	Title	Album
2016	"Now or Never" (DJ Switch featuring Shane Eagle, ProVerb, Reason and Kwesta)	
2016	"Now or Never" (remix) (DJ Switch featuring Reason, Priddy Ugly, Ginger Trill, ProVerb, Pro Kid, Shane Eagle, Zakwe, Blaklez, YoungstaCPT, Kid Tini, Siya Shezi and Big Star Johnson)	
2016	"Mayo" (DJ Speedsta featuring Yung Swiss, Tellaman, Shane Eagle and Frank Casino)	
2016	"Pillow Talk" (Priddy Ugly featuring Refi Sings, KLY and Shane Eagle)	You Don't Know Me Yet

List of non-single guest appearances, with other performing artists, showing year released and album name
Year	Title	Album
2015	"I Want It All" (DJ Speedsta featuring Nasty C and Shane Eagle)	The Guy: Episode 1 - Season 23
2016	"Pray" (Priddy Ugly featuring Shane Eagle and A-Reece)	You Don't Know Me Yet
2016	"Oceans" (DJ Sliqe featuring Da L.E.S and Shane Eagle)	Injayam, Vol. 1
2017	"02Hero" (Priddy Ugly featuring Shane Eagle)	EGYPT
