= Jackie Queens =

Zimbabwean-born singer and songwriter

- Born: Zimbabwe
- Origin: Zimbabwe
- Genres: House; Deep house; Soulful house; Afro house
- Occupations: singer; songwriter
- Instrument: Vocals
- Years active: 2013–present
- Label: Bae Electronica

Jackie Queens is a Zimbabwean-born singer and songwriter. Her music is a combination of House containing elements from deep house and soulful house. She’s also the founder of Bae Electronica, a record label she launched to release her own music and also showcase other black women house musicians.

== Early life and career ==
Jackie Queens was born in Zimbabwe. She has spent 12 years in South Africa where she developed her love for writing and performing.

In 2015, she released her single "Conqueror". The single caught the attention of the South African DJ, Black Coffee and became a prominent fixture on the DJ’s sets across the world. Explaining her single:

Certainly the thought to make Conqueror official was not something I had in mind. At that time I was deeply questioning my path in music. Before anything else music, for me, is about community. You don’t make music or become who you are on your own. In the grand scheme of things it’s a belief system, it’s spiritual, and a channel for empowerment. Indeed Conqueror itself, and the trajectory of Enoo Napa’s Opaque Mix signifies all of those things for me.

On 19 September 2017, she released a three-track EP titled Women of House which featured vocalists Sió and Zipho, and formed part of her larger project of amplifying the voices of women in house music.

In 2018, she released her single "Feel It" produced by South African music producer Cornelius SA, which was nominated in the 2018 Dance Music Awards South Africa for Best House Record of the Year and Best EDM Record of the Year. She was also nominated for Best female vocalist of the Year at the 2018 Dance Music Awards South Africa and her single "Mwanangu" was nominated at the 24th South African Music Awards.

In April 2020, she was set to perform at the Boiler room in Johannesburg but the event was cancelled due to COVID-19.

In September 2020, she collaborated with South African producer Miz Dee on the EP Back To Us. The EP was released to highlight a message against the violence of women, ongoing femicide, and the global #MeToo and #TimesUp movements in South Africa where she provides platforms for artists who are unseen, and in doing so, fulfils a crucial role in the education of the South African dance music scene. She has been recognised by Resident Advisor on their 2021 Re-record list celebrating 120 Black artists in the past decade.

She has been featured on Kaya FM's Platinum Friday with T-Bose and has also performed in music festivals and venues such as the Red Bull Beyond The Sound on Red Bull TV in Johannesburg and Oppikoppi.

== Awards and nominations ==
Year	Award ceremony	Prize	Result
2018	Dance Music Awards South Africa	Best House Record of the Year	Nominated
2018	Dance Music Awards South Africa	Best EDM Record of the Year	Nominated
2018	Dance Music Awards South Africa	Best Female vocalist of the Year	Nominated
2018	South African Music Awards	Remix of the Year	Nominated

== Discography ==
- Women of House (2017)
- Back To Us EP (2020)
