= King Zamar =

2017 album by Lady Zamar

Studio album by Lady Zamar
- Released: 31 March 2017
- Genre: Dance; house
- Length: 75:35
- Label: Universal Music South Africa
- Producer: Yamikani Banda (also exec.); Itumeleng Segatlhe; Neo Tsatsimpe; Hypnosis; Troy Lilley; Frans Phetolo; Kgosi Prince Chauke; Dr Moruti; Katlego Tigele; Sipho Archibald Msiza; Bulele Booi; David Balshaw; Mercedes Mahlatse Boshego; Ronny Jokonya; Shingirayi Zimanyi; Mfanafuthi Nkosi

Lady Zamar chronology
Cotton Candy (2015)	King Zamar (2017)	Monarch (2019)

Deluxe edition cover

Singles from King Zamar
- 1. "Love Is Blind" Released: 22 August 2016

King Zamar is the first solo studio album by South African singer-songwriter prominently known under the alias of Lady Zamar, it was released on 31 March 2017 through Universal Music South Africa and was certified Platinum by the Recording Industry of South Africa (RiSA).

== Track listing ==
King Zamar
No.	Title	Writer(s)	Producer(s)	Length
1.	"Love Is Blind"	Yamikani Banda; Hypnosis	Itumeleng Segatlhe; Neo Tsatsimpe; Hypnosis; Troy Lilley	3:49
2.	"Kissing (King Zamar)"	Yamikani Banda	Frans Phetolo; Yamikani Banda	5:16
3.	"Sophiatown"	Yamikani Banda	Kgosi Prince Chauke; Yamikani Banda	6:26
4.	"Stranger (featuring Mpumi and Ayanda Jiya)"	Yamikani Banda; Sibongile Ayanda Sizwesiyanda Jiya; Nompumelelo Mzobe	Dr Moruti; Yamikani Banda	5:29
5.	"Collide"	Yamikani Banda	Frans Phetolo; Yamikani Banda	6:32
6.	"El'Diego"	Yamikani Banda	Frans Phetolo; Yamikani Banda	5:56
7.	"He'll No"	Yamikani Banda	Frans Phetolo; Yamikani Banda	5:29
8.	"It's You - Dreaming"	Yamikani Banda	Frans Phetolo; Yamikani Banda	4:51
9.	"Moonlight"	Yamikani Banda	Katlego Tigele	5:44
10.	"Poison"	Yamikani Banda	Frans Phetolo; Yamikani Banda	4:45
11.	"More To Life"	Yamikani Banda	Frans Phetolo; Yamikani Banda; Dr Moruti	5:17
12.	"My Baby"	Yamikani Banda	Sipho Archibald Msiza; Yamikani Banda	5:15
13.	"Bang Bang"	Yamikani Banda	Yamikani Banda; Dr Moruti	5:23
14.	"Games"	Yamikani Banda	Frans Phetolo; Yamikani Banda	5:09
Total length:				75:35

Deluxe edition
No.	Title	Writer(s)	Producer(s)	Length
15.	"What You Need"	Yamikani Banda	Bulele Booi; David Balshaw	3:26
16.	"What Happens In... Stays In... (featuring Saudi)"	Yamikani Banda; Anele Mbishe	Yamikani Banda; Mercedes Mahlatse Boshego; Ronny Jokonya; Shingirayi Zimanyi	3:52
17.	"Gravity"	Yamikani Banda; Jabulani Sihle Makhubo	Mfanafuthi Nkosi	4:02
18.	"My Baby (Acoustic)"	Yamikani Banda	Yamikani Banda	5:24
Total length:				92:19

== Certifications ==
Region	Certification	Certified units/sales
South Africa (RISA)	Platinum	30,000^{‡}
^{‡} Sales+streaming figures based on certification alone.

== Awards and nominations ==
Year	Award ceremony	Category	Recipient/Nominated work	Results	Ref.
2018	South African Music Awards	Album of the Year	King Zamar	Nominated	
2018	South African Music Awards	Female Artist of the Year	King Zamar	Nominated	
2018	South African Music Awards	Best Dance Album	King Zamar	Won	
