= KDDO =

Nigerian music producer

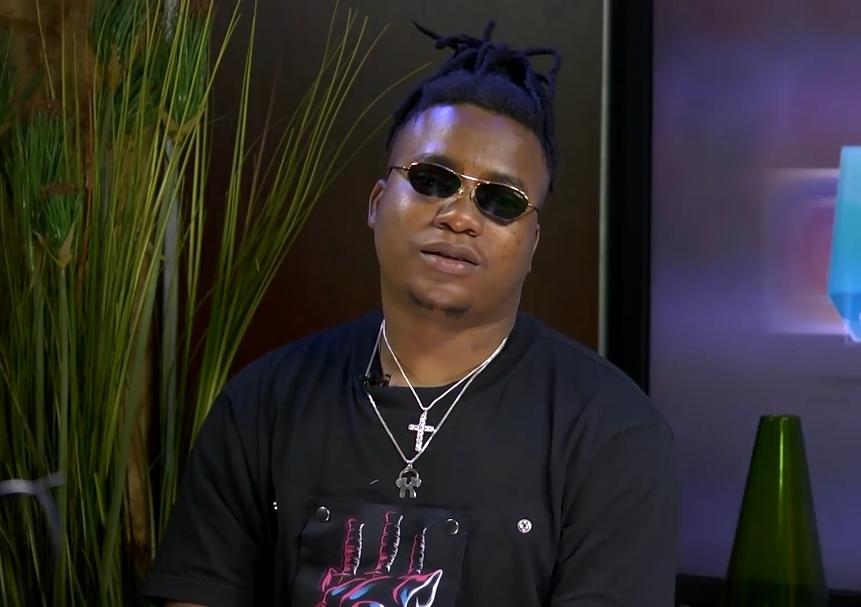

Background information
- Born: Ayoola Oladapo Agboola; 13 July 1992 (age 34); Lagos, Nigeria
- Origin: Lagos, Nigeria
- Genres: Afrobeat; Dancehall; R&B
- Occupations: Record producer; DJ; entrepreneur; songwriter
- Years active: 2011 – Present
- Labels: Pentlife Music; Sony Music Publishing; Sony ATV; Bamboo Artists

Ayoola Oladapo Agboola also known as KDDO (and formerly as Kiddominant) is a Nigerian DJ, record producer, songwriter, and artist. He is best known for producing and writing "Under The Influence" by Chris Brown, charting at number 1 on the Billboard Rhythmic Chart, and number 12 on the Billboard Hot 100. In addition KDDO wrote and produced Afrobeats longest charting Billboard single "Fall" by Davido, renowned for breaking Afrobeat Music globally. The song peaked on US R&B/Hip-Hop Airplay chart at number 13 and US Hot R&B Songs chart at number 25 on Billboard. KDDO is the first Afrobeats producer in history to be certified by the Recording Industry Association of America, after Fall became a certified gold record in the US. He is currently managed by Rehan Manickam, Director of A&R (USA) at Bamboo Artists.

== Early life and education ==
He was born and raised in Lagos State, Nigeria. He attend O&A Academy in Ogun state and also an alumnus of Redeemer's University, where he studied actuarial science.

== Career ==
KDDO began his career in Lagos, Nigeria, where he worked as a DJ from the age of fourteen while learning music production. His earliest work appeared through collaborations with Nigerian artists in the early 2010s, including several releases for Orezi. These productions helped introduce him within the developing Afrobeats scene and led to further work with established artists, including contributions to Davido’s singles “Dodo” and “The Money.”

He gained wider recognition in 2017 through his production of Davido’s single “Fall,” which went on to become one of the most streamed African songs of its era. The track played a significant role in increasing global awareness of Afrobeats and marked a turning point in his international visibility. In a 2016 interview with The Hundreds, KDDO discussed his upbringing in Lagos, the influence of the city’s music culture, and cited Fela Kuti, Timbaland, Kanye West, Sade Adu and Polow da Don as key influences. He later signed a publishing agreement with Sony/ATV Music Publishing in March 2017.

In 2018, he became the first Nigerian record producer to receive certification from the Recording Industry of South Africa for his work on “Fall” and AKA’s “Fela in Versace.” In 2019, he appeared on Chris Brown’s album Indigo (Extended), contributing both writing and production to “Under the Influence” and “Lower Body.” “Under the Influence” later achieved multi-platinum commercial success and entered the Billboard Hot 100, becoming one of his most internationally prominent credits.

Alongside these releases, KDDO continued working across Afrobeats, R&B, pop and dancehall. His catalogue includes production or writing for artists such as Wizkid, PartyNextDoor, Summer Walker, Popcaan, Shenseea, Ayra Starr, Mayorkun, Tiwa Savage, DJ Neptune, Becky Hill, Anitta and others. His work with PartyNextDoor included producing and writing “For Certain,” which appeared on the album PARTYNEXTDOOR 4 (P4), released in 2020.

Beginning around 2019, he shifted part of his focus toward House and Afro-House, spending several years developing a more electronic-leaning sound while continuing to produce for other artists. He later released material under his own name and began performing internationally as a DJ-producer. His appearances have included shows in Switzerland, Germany, Portugal, South Africa, Malawi, and the United States, as well as participation in multi-day electronic and Afro-House events and festival gatherings.

== Tours ==
On July 12, 2017, KDDO kicked off his first tour "L.O.U.D Music Production Tour" which took place in 9 states including Abuja, Lagos State, Enugu, Port Harcourt, Johannesburg, Cape Town, Nairobi, Accra and Addis Ababa supported by Sony ATV and Davido Music Worldwide.

He has also appeared at a number of high-profile concerts and events. In December 2017 he shared the stage with Mayorkun at the Mayor of Lagos Concert. The following year he performed with AKA during the 2018 AFCON qualifier match between Nigeria and South Africa.

In 2022, KDDO performed with Bas at Red Rocks Amphitheatre in Denver.

Beyond these, KDDO has performed internationally at venues and events across Europe, Africa and North America, participating in nightclub appearances, touring lineups and festival gatherings. His live appearances have included shows in Switzerland, Germany, Portugal, South Africa, Malawi, and the United States. Reports also indicate his inclusion in a 2025 electronic-music festival lineup in California.

== Discography ==
As lead artist and as producer
Year	Title	Album
2011	"This Christmas" (Kiddominant featuring Jarmeu and M.Y. Kesh)	Non-album singles
2012	"G.R.E.E.N." (Kiddominant featuring. M.Y. Kesh & Jarmeu)	Non-album singles
2013	"Rihanna" (Orezi)	The Gehn Gehn Album
2013	"Maserati" (Orezi featuring Kiddominant)	The Gehn Gehn Album
2013	"Zarokome" (Orezi)	The Gehn Gehn Album
2013	"Don't Break My Heart" (Cynthia Morgan)	Non-album singles
2015	"Dodo" (Davido)	Non-album singles
2015	"Ogede" (Orezi featuring Wizkid and Timaya)	The Gehn Gehn Album
2015	"How Long" (Orezi)	The Gehn Gehn Album
2015	"The Money" (Davido featuring Olamide)	
2015	"Double Your Hustle (DYH)" (Orezi)	The Gehn Gehn Album
2015	"Hookah" (Danagog featuring Davido)	Hookah Dabb
2016	"Marry" (DJ Neptune featuring Mr Eazi)	Love & Greatness
2016	"Maga 2 Mugu" (Davido featuring Simi)	Son of Mercy
2017	"My Story" (Popcaan featuring Davido)	Non-album single
2017	"Fall" (Davido)	A Good Time
2017	"Mama" (Mayorkun)	The Mayor of Lagos
2017	"Che Che" (Mayorkun)	The Mayor of Lagos
2018 "Assurance"	"Alright" (featuring Wizkid)	Non-album single
2018 "Assurance"	"Fela in Versace" (AKA featuring Kiddominant)	Touch My Blood
2018 "Assurance"	"Fantasy" (Mayorkun)	The Mayor of Lagos
2018 "Assurance"	"Oshepete" (Mayorkun featuring D'banj)	The Mayor of Lagos
2019	"Jika" (AKA featuring Yanga Chief)	Touch My Blood
2019	"Next to You, Pt. II" (Becky G and Digital Farm Animals featuring Davido and Rvssian)	Non-album single
2019	"All I Want" (Russ featuring Davido)	Non-album single
2019	"Amnesia" (Bas featuring Ari Lennox and Kiddominant)	Spilled Milk 1
2019	"Lower Body" (Chris Brown featuring Davido)	Indigo
2019	"Intro" (Davido)	A Good Time
2019	"One Thing" (Davido)	A Good Time
2019	"D&G" (Davido featuring Summer Walker)	A Good Time
2020	"In The Dark" (Kat Capone featuring Kiddominant)	Siren
2020	"eWallet" (featuring Cassper Nyovest)	Non-album single
2020	"Tanana" (Davido featuring Tiwa Savage)	A Better Time
2022	"Can't Anymore" (Shenseea)	Alpha
2022	"Under the Influence" (Chris Brown)	Indigo (Extended)
2023	"Yeh Yeh" (Rich The Kid featuring Rema, Ayra Starr, KDDO)	Non-album single
2023	"Company" (with AKA)	Mass Country
2024	"For Certain" (PartyNextDoor)	PARTYNEXTDOOR 4 (P4)

== Accolades ==
Year	Award ceremony	Prize	Result	Ref(s)
2016	City People Entertainment Awards	Music Producer of the Year	Nominated	
2017	City People Entertainment Awards	Music Producer of the Year ("Fall" by Davido)	Nominated	
2017	Soundcity MVP Awards Festival	African Producer Of The Year	Nominated	
2017	The Beatz Award	Best afro beat producer ("Mama" by Mayorkun)	Nominated	
2017	The Beatz Award	Best songwriter ("Mama" by Mayorkun)	Nominated	
2017	All Youth Tush Awards	Music Producer of the Year	Nominated	
2018	The Headies	Producer of the Year "Fall by (Davido) & Mama by (Mayorkun)"	Won	
2018	City People Music Award	Music Producer of the Year	Nominated	
2019	South African Music Awards	Record of the Year ( fan Voted) "Fela in Versace by AKA (featuring. Kiddominant)"	Nominated	
2019	South African Music Awards	Best Produced Album "Touch My Blood"	Nominated	
2019	Recording Industry Certification of America (RIAA)	Chris Brown- Indigo album	Platinum	
2019	Recording Industry Association of America (RIAA)	AKA – Fela in Versace	4× Platinum	
2020	Recording Industry Association of America (RIAA)	Fall by Davido	Gold	
2020	Music Canada	Fall by Davido	Gold	
2023	BMI	Under The Influence	Won	
