= Lady Zamar =

- Born: Yamikani Janet Banda; 19 June 1995 (age 31); South Africa
- Origin: South African
- Genres: Dance; House; Pop; Afropop
- Occupations: Singer; Writer; Author; Artist
- Instrument: Vocals
- Years active: 2016–present
- Label: Universal Music South Africa

Yamikani Janet Banda, professionally known under the alias of Lady Zamar, is a South African singer, songwriter and author.

== Career ==
=== 2015-2016: Lady Zamar & Junior Taurus, Cotton Candy ===
Lady Zamar and Junior Taurus met in 2011. On 14 October 2015, their debut album Cotton Candy was released. The album produced three singles, including "Mamelodi", "Run Away" and "Pitori".

At the 22nd South African Music Awards, Cotton Candy was nominated for Duo/Group of the Year and Best Dance Album. Soon after its release, Lady Zamar decided to pursue a solo career.

=== 2017-present: Solo projects, King Zamar, and Monarch ===
Lady Zamar's first solo album, King Zamar, was released in March 2017. In February 2018 the album was certified gold, and in June 2019 it was certified double platinum.

In 2017, Lady Zamar won the Song of the Year Award at the DStv Mzansi Viewers Choice Awards for her song "Charlotte", produced by Prince Kaybee. At the 24th South African Music Awards she won the award for Best Dance Album. On 11 March 2018, she headlined the Vivo Nation Festival.

On 9 August 2018, National Women's Day, she performed at a concert dedicated to women, alongside fellow artists Mafikizolo and Sho Madjozi.

Her second solo album Monarch was released on 21 June 2019.

At the 4th Mzansi Kwaito and House Music Awards in 2019, her single "This is Love" won Best House Single.

In the first quarter of 2024, she announced and promoted her album titled Rainbow, dropping in April.

== Discography ==
=== Studio albums ===
List of studio albums, with selected chart positions and certifications
Title	Album details	Peak chart positions	Certifications
Title	Album details	ZA	Certifications
Cotton Candy (with Junior Taurus)	Released: 14 October 2015; Label: Ca City Records; Formats: Digital download	—	
King Zamar	Released: 31 March 2017; Label: Universal Music; Formats: CD, Digital download	—	RiSA: Platinum
Monarch	Released: 21 July 2019; Label: Universal Music; Formats: CD, Digital download	—	
Rainbow	Released : 12 April 2024; Label: Universal Music; Formats: CD, Digital download, Streaming	—	

== Awards and nominations ==
In her career as a solo artist, she has received several awards, including 5 SAMA awards, 1 Independent Music Award, 1 DMVCA, 2 Dance Awards, 1 Darling Award and Coolest Female Celebrity Award.

=== Dance Music Awards South Africa ===
Year	Nominee / work	Award	Result	Ref.
2019	Herself	Best Female Vocalist	Nominated	
