= Mayo (song) =

2016 single by DJ Speedsta featuring various artists

Single by DJ Speedsta featuring Yung Swiss, Tellaman, Shane Eagle and Frank Casino
- Released: 19 August 2016
- Recorded: 2016
- Genre: Hip hop; trap
- Length: 5:06
- Label: Sony Music Entertainment Africa
- Songwriters: Lesego Nkaiseng; Thelumusa Owen; Nhlanhla Tshabalala; Benn Gilbert Kamoto; Steve Dang; Shane Hughes
- Producer: Gemini Major

DJ Speedsta singles chronology
"Celebration" (2016)	"Mayo" (2016)	"I Don't Know" (2017)

Music video
- "Mayo" on YouTube

"Mayo" is a single by South African DJ and artist DJ Speedsta featuring Yung Swiss, Tellaman, Shane Eagle, and Frank Casino. "Mayo" is produced by Gemini Major, Family Tree's in-house producer. The song has peaked at number 1 on South Africa's biggest radio stations Metro FM Top 40 chart & 5FM Top 10 at 10 Hip Hop chart. On June 5, 2017 "Mayo" was certified gold by the Recording Industry of South Africa.

== Music video ==
The music video was released on DJ Speedsta's Vevo account on September 9, 2016; cumulating over 1 million views on YouTube. The song peaked at No.1 on the Trace Urban "SA Hip Hop 10" Chart on November 1, 2016.

== Accolades ==
The single "Mayo" was nominated for Best Collaboration and Best Hit Single at the 16th Metro FM Music Awards.

Year	Award Ceremony	Prize	Result
2017	16th Metro FM Music Awards	Best Collaboration	Nominated
2017	16th Metro FM Music Awards	Best Hit Single	Nominated
