= Jika (AKA song) =

2019 song by AKA

Single by AKA featuring Yanga Chief

from the album Touch My Blood
- Language: Zulu language
- English title: Turn Around
- Released: 21 January 2019
- Recorded: 2018
- Genre: Hip hop; Afro-pop
- Length: 5:04
- Label: Beam Group
- Songwriter(s): Kiernan Forbes; Yanga Ntshakaza; Ayoola Oladapo Agboola
- Producer(s): KDDO

AKA singles chronology
"Fela in Versace" (2018)	"Jika" (2019)	"Main Ou's" (2019)

Yanga Chief singles chronology
"Iyeaus" (2018)	"Jika" (2019)	"Juju Remix" (2019)

Music video
- "Jika" (Official video on YouTube

Official audio
- "Jika" on YouTube

"Jika" is a single by South African rapper AKA taken from his third studio album Touch My Blood. It was re-released on 21 January 2019 through Beam Group, features guest appearance from frequent collaborator Yanga Chief, and production from KDDO.

In 2020 the single won South African Music Award for Best Music Video of the Year, and was nominated for Record of the Year.

== Music video ==
The Misic video was released in celebration of AKA's birthday on 27 January 2019, directed by Skystar Films and produced by Nhlanhla "Life of Nivo" Ndimande. The video illustrates the concept of old age and youth, starring Yanga Chief playing the role of an old man, and guest appearance from actress Celeste Khumalo. As of October 2023, the music video sits on over 11,6 million views on YouTube.

== Awards and nominations ==
Year	Award ceremony	Category	Recipient/Nominated work	Results	Ref.
2020	South African Music Awards	Best Music Video of the Year	"Jika"	Won	
2020	South African Music Awards	Record of the Year	"Jika"	Nominated	
