= Blow My Mind =

2019 single by Davido and Chris Brown

Single by Davido featuring Chris Brown

from the album A Good Time
- Released: 26 July 2019
- Recorded: 2019
- Genre: Afropop
- Length: 3:21
- Label: RCA; Sony
- Songwriters: David Adeleke; Sadiq Onifade; Christopher Brown
- Producer: Shizzi

Davido singles chronology
"4U" (2019)	"Blow My Mind" (2019)	"FFF" (2019)

Chris Brown singles chronology
"Restroom Occupied" (2019)	"Blow My Mind" (2019)	"Heat" (2019)

Music video
- "Blow My Mind" on YouTube

"Blow My Mind" is a song by American-born Nigerian singer Davido featuring fellow American singer Chris Brown. It was released on 26 July 2019 as the fourth single from Davido's album A Good Time. The song incorporates tribal sounds of African music.

"Blow My Mind" contains lyrics about a girl who blows Davido's mind simply. In the Edgar Esteves-directed visuals for "Blow My Mind", Davido and Chris Brown spend quality time in a motel with their lovers. The song's video achieved notable views in its first 24 hours and achieved 10 million views within three weeks. The song went 2× Platinum in South Africa, selling over 40,000 copies. It peaked at No. 3 on Billboard's Top Triller Global Chart on 9 August 2019.

"Blow My Mind" was nominated for Best Collaboration at the Africa Entertainment Awards USA 2020.

== Charts ==
Chart performance for "Blow My Mind"
Chart (2019)	Peak position
New Zealand Hot Singles (RMNZ)	27
US Billboard Top Triller Global	3

2025 chart performance for "Blow My Mind"
Chart (2025)	Peak position
Jamaica Airplay (JAMMS)	2

== Certifications ==
Certifications for "Blow My Mind"
Region	Certification	Certified units/sales
Canada (Music Canada)	Gold	40,000^{‡}
Nigeria (RCN)	Platinum	5,000
South Africa (RISA)	3× Platinum	120,000^{‡}
United States (RIAA)	Gold	500,000^{‡}
^{‡} Sales+streaming figures based on certification alone.
