= Fela in Versace =

"Fela In Versace"

Single by AKA featuring Kiddominant

from the album Touch My Blood
- Released: 27 July 2018
- Genre: Hip hop
- Length: 5:25
- Label: Beam Group
- Songwriter(s): Kiernan Forbes, Ayoola Agboola
- Producer(s): Kiddominant, Robert "Chuck Davis" Luhanga

AKA singles chronology
"Beyonce" (2018)	"Fela In Versace" (2018)	"Jika" (2019)

"Fela In Versace" is a single by South African rapper AKA from his third studio album Touch My Blood. It features Nigerian record producer Kiddominant. It was released on 27 July 2018 by Beam Group.

== Commercial performance ==
The song was received well by the public and became AKA's hit single to be included on Global Spotify Playlist, It also has spent five consecutive weeks at No.1 on the Metro FM Top 40 Chart including on Ukhozi FM Top 40 Chart.

== Music video ==
The music video for "Fela In Versace" was shot in Downtown, Johannesburg with several revealed landmark and was directed by Nate Thomas. The music video of the song was released on AKA's VEVO account on September 12, 2018. Since it was released has surpassed over 3 000 000 views.
