= Rose Gold (album) =

Studio album by Shekhinah
- Released: 6 October 2017
- Recorded: 2016–17
- Genre: Pop
- Length: 41:14
- Label: Sony Music Entertainment Africa
- Producer: Shekhinah; David Scott; DJ Maphorisa; Luke Goliath; Mae N. Maejor

Shekhinah chronology
Rose Gold (2017)	Trouble In Paradise (2021)

Singles from Rose Gold
- 1. "Suited" Released: 19 July 2017; 2. "Please Mr." Released: 9 February 2019

Rose Gold is the debut studio album by South African singer-songwriter Shekhinah. It was released by Sony Music Entertainment Africa on October 6, 2017. Rose Gold was certified gold by the Recording Industry of South Africa on January 24, 2018 and later certified platinum on August 31, 2018. The album features guest appearances from South African rapper, Rouge, Asali and Jamali band member, Mariechan. Production is handled by David Scott, DJ Maphorisa, Mae N. Maejor, Shekhinah and Luke Goliath.

== Singles ==
The album's promotional single, "Suited" was released on 19 July 2017. Produced by South African record producer and recording artist DJ Maphorisa, the song was certified Platinum by RiSA on 24 January 2018. Sony Music announced on 5 April that the single reached Diamond status.

Shekhinah speaking on the song:

I would love to ease my audience into my new album, I don’t want to stretch too far from my usual sound. I used bongo drums in the track which I know my fans will relate to and instantly recognise. When I was working on the track I imagined it fitting snuggly into people’s intimate spaces. I could hear the song playing in many kitchens on a sunny afternoon as lovers prepare their favourite meal. I could see soul mates gleaming with joy as they remembered what they were doing the first time they heard it and how they felt.

The music video for the single was released on Shekhinah's Vevo account on 17 August 2017. It was directed by Nate Thomas and has garnered over 3.2 million views on YouTube.

The second single "Please Mr." was released on 9 February 2018. Sony Music later announced on 29 March that the song was certified Gold.

== Track listing ==
Credits adapted from Tidal.

Rose Gold
No.	Title	Writer(s)	Producer(s)	Length
1.	"Intro"	Shekhinah Thandi Donnell; Mfundo Mbuli	David Scott	0:31
2.	"Into the Jungle"	S. Donnell; Yuvir Pillay	David Scott	3:18
3.	"The Sound" (featuring Asali)	S. Donnell; Michael Morare; Theophillus Seretse; Mfundo Mbuli	David Scott	3:55
4.	"Overdose"	S. Donnell; Nadeem Hooisane	David Scott	3:31
5.	"Just Fine"	S. Donnell; Luthando Phihlela	David Scott	3:31
6.	"Different" (featuring Mariechan)	S. Donnell; Amon Taulo Chibiya II	Mae N. Maejor	2:37
7.	"Anyway I Want"	S. Donnell; Lulama Mhlaba	David Scott	4:12
8.	"Thirst"	S. Donnell; Michael Morare; Mfundo Mbuli	David Scott	3:52
9.	"Power to She" (featuring Rouge)	S. Donnell; Deko Barbara-Jessica Wedi; Mfundo Mbuli; Michael Morare	David Scott	3:26
10.	"Please Mr"	S. Donnell; Michael Morare; Mfundo Mbuli	David Scott	3:45
11.	"Rose Gold"	S. Donnel; Tumelo Sithole; Mfundo Mbuli	David Scott	4:46
12.	"Suited"	S. Donnell; Themba Sonnyboy Sekowe; Luke Goliath	DJ Maphorisa; Shekhinah; Luke Goliath	3:53
Total length:				41:14

== Release history ==
List of release dates, showing region, formats, label, editions and reference
Region	Date	Format(s)	Label	Edition(s)
South Africa	6 October 2017	CD; digital download	Sony Music Africa	Standard edition

== Certifications ==
Region	Certification	Certified units/Sales
South Africa (RiSA)	Platinum	100,000+
