= A Better Time =

2020 studio album by Davido

Studio album by Davido
- Released: 13 November 2020
- Genre: Afropop
- Length: 54:00
- Labels: DMW; RCA; Sony
- Producers: Hit-Boy; Speroach Beatz; Fresh VDM; Lord Sky; Nick Papz; Xander; CKay; Blaise Beats; Kiddominant; Napji; Mayorkun; Masterdon; Semzi; Dante; El Jack; Chillz; Magicboi

Davido chronology
A Good Time (2019)	A Better Time (2020)	Timeless (2023)

Singles from A Better Time
- 1. "Fem" Released: 10 September 2020; 2. "So Crazy" Released: 9 November 2020; 3. "Jowo" Released: 4 December 2020; 4. "The Best" Released: 28 January 2021

A Better Time is the third studio album by Nigerian singer Davido. It was released on 13 November 2020, through Davido Music Worldwide (DMW), RCA Records and Sony Music. The album features guest appearances from Nicki Minaj, Nas, Young Thug, Mayorkun, Chris Brown, Tiwa Savage, Mugeez, CKay, Lil Baby, Hit-Boy, Sho Madjozi, Bella Shmurda and Sauti Sol. Its production was handled by Hit-Boy, Napji, Fresh VDM, Peruzzi and Speroach Beatz, among others.

Davido had not planned to release an album in 2020, since he had announced a North American tour in support of his 2019 album, A Good Time and did not think he would have time to record, with the tour scheduled to begin in the winter and end in spring 2020. However, in March 2020 he had to cancel the sold-out 26-show tour due to the ongoing COVID-19 pandemic, and as a result returned to the studio to record the tracks that became A Better Time.

== Background ==
Davido recorded A Better Time in Lagos, Nigeria, except for two songs ("Heaven" and Shopping Spree") which were recorded in Los Angeles. He told NME that "With the lockdown and me just being at home it gave me time to really work on the music rather than having to juggle it with being on the road. There was nothing to do. There were no shows. I was at home with my producers, just creating and creating all day." NME described the album as making "a convincing case that the problems of the world really might just melt away – even if only momentarily – though a sense of escapism and the enduring powers of art and pop music." He told Complex, "We (African people) always like to celebrate and A Better Time is that outlet to be free, be happy and hopeful for a better future."

The album's cover art features Davido with his then-one-year-old son Ifeanyi Adeleke.

== Singles ==
The album's lead single "Fem" was released on 11 September 2020. It was produced by Napji. With lyrics in both English and Yoruba, the title translates from Yoruba roughly as "Shut up." It has been sung by #EndSARS protesters in Nigeria, protests which Davido himself traveled to Abuja to join. The video attracted a million views within nine hours of its release and three million in its first 24 hours, while the single reached No. 1 on Apple Music in at least eight countries, including Nigeria, where it held the top spot for four weeks. It also hit No. 8 on Billboard's World digital Song Sales chart.

The album's second single "So Crazy" was released on 9 November 2020. It featured Lil Baby and was produced by Nick Papz and Xander. The music video was directed by David Wept and filmed in Los Angeles.

The third single, "Jowo", was released on 4 December 2020, produced by Napji and Magicboi. The video, directed by Dammy Twitch and shot in Lagos, received more than 24 million views on YouTube in its first four months.

The fourth single, "The Best", was produced by Mayorkun and Semzi and released on 28 January 2021. In the music video, filmed in Lagos and directed by Dammy Twitch, the two artists paid homage to Japanese culture.

== Critical reception ==
In one of the first reviews to appear, Kevin EG Perry of NME awarded A Better Time 4 stars out of 5, comparing the album to its predecessor A Good Time as follows: "While it remains to be seen whether it can capture the zeitgeist in the way that its predecessor did, this 17-track collection certainly matches up in terms of tunes." Perry added: "clearly his good vibes are contagious. That’s true of the whole record, which is heavy on steel drums, synths and horns and light on trouble."

Tochi Imo of Clash Music wrote, "The feature-heavy project sees Davido match up with the likes of Nicki Minaj and Lil Baby on a tape filled with a mixture of both high and gentle energies throughout. Themes such as romance frequent the project and whilst Davido doesn’t stray too far from his lyrical comfort zone, we can enjoy an artist we know and love in his newest record."

A mixed review by Wale Oloworekende at The Native stated: "Too many times on A Better Time, Davido’s hits-focused approach impedes the continuity of exciting concepts and sacrifices cohesion for dynamism, but the tradeoff is a body of work that doubles down on Davido’s worldview and presents a clear vision of how Nigerian pop can dovetail with American hip-hop at full blast." Tomiwa at Too Xclusive wrote that the album was "a show of growth and development, although there are quite some misses on this one, the fact that he didn’t change the status quo and still kept it fresh with a slew of incredible features that makes it spectacular."

== Accolades ==
At the 6th ceremony of All Africa Music Awards, A Better Time received a nomination for Album of the Year.

Year	Nominee / work	Award	Result
2021	A Better Time	Album of the Year	Nominated

== Track listing ==
Credits adapted from OkayAfrica.

No.	Title	Writer(s)	Producer(s)	Length
1.	"Fem"	David Adeleke	Napji	3:22
2.	"Jowo"	Adeleke; Oladeinde Okubajo	Magicboi; Napji	2:56
3.	"Something Fishy"	Onome Ojoboh; Adeleke	Chillz	2:53
4.	"Holy Ground" (featuring Nicki Minaj)	Adeleke; Tobechukwu Victor; Onika Tanya Maraj	Speroach	2:42
5.	"Heaven"	Wale Kwame Adadevoh; Adeleke	El Jack	3:10
6.	"Very Special"	Adeleke; Akinmayokun Awodumila	Dante	2:44
7.	"The Best" (featuring Mayorkun)	Adeleke; Adewale Mayowa Emmanuel	Mayorkun	3:46
8.	"Shopping Spress" (featuring Chris Brown and Young Thug)	Oluwatoyin Oladehinde; Chris Brown; Jeffery Lamar	Masterdon	3:33
9.	"Sunlight"	Adeleke	Napji	2:11
10.	"Tanana"	Adeleke; Tiwatope Savage; Ayoola Agboloa	Kiddominant	3:42
11.	"MeBe" (featuring Mugeez)	Adeleke; Rashid Abdul Mugeez; Dennis King-Naneworter	Speroach	4:00
12.	"La La" (featuring CKay)	Adeleke; Chukwuka Ekweani	CKay; Blaise Beats	3:07
13.	"So Crazy" (featuring Lil Baby)	Adeleke; Dominique Jones	Nick Papz; Xander	2:50
14.	"Birthday Cake" (featuring Nas and Hit-Boy)	Adeleke; Nasir Jones	Hit-Boy	2:50
15.	"I Got a Friend" (featuring Mayorkun & Sho Madjozi)	Adeleke; Mayowa; Asa Asika; Alwajud Umardeen; Bobo Ajudua; Lateef Raimi; Edward Chukuma-jiah; Maya Wegerif; Wilton Ricketts, Jr	Fresh VDM	4:38
16.	"Fade" (featuring Bella Shmurda)	Adeleke; Akinbiyi Abiola Ahmed	Speroach	3:26
17.	"On My Way" (featuring Sauti Sol)	Adeleke; Victor; Sauti Sol	Lord Sky	3:50
Total length:				54:00

== Charts ==
Chart performance for A Better Time
Chart (2020)	Peak position
US Heatseekers Albums (Billboard)	2
US World Albums (Billboard)	4
UK Albums (Official Charts)	88
US Billboard 200	170

== Release history ==
Region	Date	Format	Label
Various	12 November 2020	CD; digital download; streaming	DMW; RCA; Sony
