= Fall (Davido song) =

2017 single by Davido

Single by Davido

from the album A Good Time
- Released: 2 June 2017
- Recorded: 2017
- Genre: Afrobeats
- Label: DMW; Sony
- Songwriters: David Adeleke; Ayoola Agboola
- Producer: Kiddominant

Davido singles chronology
"My Story" (2017)	"Fall" (2017)	"Ladies (Remix)" (2017)

Music video
- "Fall" on YouTube

"Fall" is a song by Nigerian singer Davido. It was released on 2 June 2017 as the second single from his second studio album, A Good Time (2019). The song was produced by Nigerian record producer Kiddominant. On 25 June 2017, "Fall" was ranked second on Playdata charts' list of the Most Played Songs in Nigeria. According to Rolling Stone magazine, "Fall" was one of the top-100-most-Shazam-searched singles in America in January 2019, and was a top-10 record on Shazam in New York. In February 2019, "Fall" became the longest charting Nigerian pop song in Billboard history. It was ranked 163 on Pitchfork's list of the 200 Best Songs of the 2010s. As of May 2025, "Fall" has received over 100 million streams on Spotify, and has been certified platinum by the RIAA and Music Canada.

== Background ==
Davido recorded "Fall" in 2017, and a snippet of it was leaked in May that year. The track contains a sample of Kojo Funds' single "Dun Talking". Following accusations of plagiarism from fans, Davido told Metro's Tobi Akingbade that he was inspired by "Dun Talking", and contacted Kojo Funds before releasing "Fall". The song was the first Afrobeats song to be certified gold in the U.S. In February 2019, Busta Rhymes and his artist Prayah released a remix of "Fall". Rhymes used Instagram to build hype around the song before releasing it. However, their version was taken down by YouTube under a directive from Sony Music.

== Music video ==
The accompanying music video for "Fall" was directed by Daps. In December 2018, the video surpassed 100 million views, becoming the most-viewed video by a Nigerian artist on Youtube. In the video's early moments, Davido appears to be in a heated argument with his lover. He exits a Rolls-Royce after the argument and spends the rest of the video daydreaming about being with a ballerina from behind a glass window. Toye Sokunbi of The Native magazine said the video "is consistent with his lyrics that he no longer wants to be a player" and that "it comes as no surprise that he is seen at the end of the video, apparently brushing off the temptation of being with someone else".

== Charts ==
=== Weekly charts ===
Chart (2017–2022)	Peak position
Nigeria Airplay (Playdata charts)	2
US Afrobeats Songs (Billboard)	18
US R&B/Hip-Hop Airplay (Billboard)	13
US Hot R&B Songs (Billboard)	25
US World Digital Song Sales (Billboard)	3

=== Year-end charts ===
Chart (2022)	Position
US Afrobeats Songs (Billboard)	40

== Certifications ==
Region	Certification	Certified units/sales
Canada (Music Canada)	Platinum	80,000^{‡}
France (SNEP)	Gold	100,000^{‡}
New Zealand (RMNZ)	Gold	15,000^{‡}
United Kingdom (BPI)	Silver	200,000^{‡}
United States (RIAA)	Platinum	1,000,000^{‡}
^{‡} Sales+streaming figures based on certification alone.
