= Touch My Blood =

Studio album by AKA
- Released: 15 June 2018
- Recorded: 2016–2018
- Genre: Hip hop
- Length: 81:59
- Label: Beam Group
- Producer: AKA (exec.); Master A Flat (exec.); Tweezy; Tazzy; Kiddominant; Anatii; Gemini Major; DJ Maphorisa; Makwa; Buks; Julian

AKA chronology
Be Careful What You Wish For (2017)	Touch My Blood (2018)	Bhovamania (2020)

Singles from Touch My Blood
- 1. "The World Is Yours" Released: 2 December 2016; 2. "Caiphus Song" Released: 10 March 2017; 3. "Star Signs" Released: 23 January 2018; 4. "Sweet Fire" Released: 26 January 2018; 5. "Beyonce" Released: 1 June 2018; 6. "Fela in Versace" Released: 27 July 2018; 7. "Jika" Released: 21 January 2019

Touch My Blood is the third album released by South African rapper AKA. Released on 15 June 2018 through Beam Group in partnership with NYCE Entertainment, it is his first independent release and is the follow-up to his sophomore album, Levels. It features guest appearances from fellow South African artists including L-Tido, JR, Yanga Chief, Stogie T, Kwesta & Okmalumkoolkat, as well as a sole international appearance by Nigerian artist and producer KDDO. Production is handled by AKA, Master A Flat, Tweezy, Tazzy, Kiddominant, Anatii, Gemini Major, DJ Maphorisa, Makwa, Buks and additional production by Julian McGuire. Touch My Blood was certified Gold by the Recording Industry of South Africa (RiSA) on 25 June 2018, just one week into its release. On 9 November 2018, the album was certified platinum by RiSA four months after its release.

== Artwork and title ==
On 20 April 2018, AKA announced a "Touch My Blood Challenge" for an internship opportunity at Beam Group. He invited members of the "Megacy", a name he has given his fanbase, to design the cover of the album which will be titled Touch My Blood. The winner of the challenge was promised a one-year internship at Beam Group.

He instructed:

Next week I will be uploading a link where designers/artists can download the open file from the shoot I'm doing for my artwork. I will also include a brief where I will include references for what I'm looking for.

On 8 May 2018, the official artwork of the album and the winner of the challenge was announced. Beam Group's & AKA's Design Team (Nicky Heat & Johnny Malepa) won the challenge with their front cover, and Taonga, a visual artist from Rustenburg, North West was the runner-up of the challenge and received an internship at Beam Group. Furthermore, his artwork was featured as the back cover for the album.

== Release and promotion ==
Touch My Blood was originally set for release on 25 May 2018. AKA announced on social media that the new album would be pushed back for release until 15 June 2018, because he needed more time to shoot videos, release singles, drop merchandise and confirm tour dates.

Giant billboards were deployed around the city of Johannesburg to promote and build hype for the album release. He took to Twitter to share some of the images of the "Touch My Blood" billboards and also called on his followers to share those they come across with him.

=== Singles ===
On 2 December 2016, AKA released the album's first single, "The World Is Yours". The music video for the song was later released on 2 February 2017 and was shot in Thailand while he was on vacation with then girlfriend, Bonang Matheba. The song topped the charts and has been certified triple Platinum in South Africa.

== Track listing ==
Credits were adapted from the album's liner notes.

Touch My Blood
No.	Title	Writer(s)	Producer(s)	Length
1.	"Touch My Blood"	K. Forbes; T. Mathebula; T. Sekowe; Y. Ntshakaza	Tweezy; DJ Maphorisa	4:54
2.	"Fully In"	K. Forbes; T. Mathebula; T. Bogopa; Y. Ntshakaza	Tweezy	4:48
3.	"Beyonce"	K. Forbes; B. Kamoto; T. Bogopa; Y. Ntshakaza; D. Mafafo	Gemini Major	4:51
4.	"Reset" (featuring JR and Okmalumkoolkat)	K. Forbes; T. Bogopa; B. Kamoto; B. Zwane; D. Mafafo	Gemini Major	4:43
5.	"Amen" (featuring L-Tido)	K. Forbes; L. Madonsela; T. Mathebula	Tweezy	6:04
6.	"Magriza" (featuring Kwesta)	K. Forbes; S. Vilakazi; N. Mazibuko	Buks	5:29
7.	"Sweet Fire"	K. Forbes; M. Shabangu; L. Lehutso	AKA; Master A Flat; Tazzy	4:15
8.	"Caiphus Song"	K. Forbes; M. Shabangu; L. Lehutso	Master A Flat; Tazzy	5:42
9.	"Fela in Versace" (featuring Kiddominant)	K. Forbes; A. Agboola	Kiddominant	5:28
10.	"Zone"	K. Forbes; M. Shabangu; L. Lehutso	AKA; Master A Flat; Tazzy	3:46
11.	"Jika" (featuring Yanga Chief)	K. Forbes; Yanga Ntshakaza; A. Agboola	KDDO	5:04
12.	"The World Is Yours"	K. Forbes; M. Shabangu; Y. Ntshakaza	Master A Flat	4:51
13.	"Me and You"	K. Forbes; A. Mnyango; Y. Ntshakaza	Anatii; Julian^{[a]}	5:25
14.	"StarSigns" (featuring Stogie T)	K. Forbes; T. Molekane; B. Kamoto; Y. Ntshakaza	Gemini Major	5:48
15.	"Mame" (featuring JR)	K. Forbes; T. Bogopa; J. Makwa; Y. Ntshakaza	Makwa	5:52
16.	"Daddy Issues ll"	K. Forbes; M. Shabangu; A. Mnyango	AKA; Master A Flat; Anatii	4:59
Total length:				81:59

Notes

- ^{^[a]} signifies an additional producer
- "Daddy Issues II" features additional vocals from AKA's daughter, Kairo.

Sample credits

- "Amen" contains a sample of "This Is Goodbye", as performed by Hollis P Monroe.
- "Sweet Fire" contains an interpolation of "Fire, Passion & Ecstasy", as performed by Ray Phiri & Stimela.
- "Fela in Versace" contains an interpolation of "Shibobo", as performed by TKZEE from the EP Shibobo.
- "The World Is Yours" contains a sample of "Løb Stop Stå" as performed by Boom Clap Bachelors from the EP MELLEM DINE LÆBER.
- "Me and You" contains an interpolation of "Raf" as performed by ASAP Mob (featuring ASAP Rocky, Playboi Carti, Quavo, Lil Uzi Vert & Frank Ocean), as well as an interpolation of "Mr. Loverman" as performed by Shabba Ranks.

== Personnel ==
Adapted from the album liner notes.

- AKA – vocals; executive producer ("Sweet Fire", "Zone", "Daddy Issues ll")
- Anatii – production ("Me and You", "Daddy Issues ll")
- Buks – production ("Magriza")
- DJ Maphorisa – production ("Touch My Blood")
- Gemini Major – production ("Beyonce", "Reset", "StarSigns")
- Julian McGuire – additional production ("Me and You")
- Kiddominant — production ("Fela In Versace", "Jika")
- Master A Flat – executive producer; production ("Sweet Fire", "Caiphus Song", "Zone", "The World Is Yours", "Daddy Issues ll")
- Ningi Poro - mix assistant
- Prince Costinyo – executive producer
- Robin Kohl – mixing
- Tazzy – production ("Sweet Fire", "Caiphus Song", "Zone")
- The Homies – executive producer
- Tweezy – production ("Touch My Blood", "Fully In", "Amen")

== Release history ==
List of release dates, showing region, formats, label, editions and reference
Region	Date	Format(s)	Label	Edition(s)
South Africa	15 June 2018	CD; digital download	Beam Group	Standard edition

== Certifications ==
Region	Certification	Certified units/sales
South Africa (RISA)	Platinum	30,000^{*}
^{*} Sales figures based on certification alone.
