= Cornelius SA =

South African music producer

- Also known as: Cornelius
- Born: Cornelius Tshepo Mashilane; Atteridgeville, Pretoria
- Origin: Gauteng, South Africa
- Genres: House; Electronic dance; Deep house; Techno; Afro house
- Occupations: Record producer; DJ; Remixer
- Years active: 2010–present
- Labels: Armada Music; Anjunadeep; Get Physical Music; Stay True Sounds; Dope Wax Records; Monstercat Silk

Cornelius Tshepo Mashilane, better known by his stage name Cornelius SA, is a South African music producer, remixer and DJ. He creates house music containing elements of Electronic dance, deep house, techno and Afro house.

== Biography ==
=== Early life ===
Cornelius was born in Atteridgeville, South Africa. He grew up in Atteridgeville, before relocating to Soshanguve in Pretoria. He fell in love with house music when he was in Primary School. He was taught how to DJ by his friend, first with vinyls and was later introduced to CDJs at the age of eighteen after completing his matric.

=== Career ===
In 2015, he won the Bridges for Music, CTEMF 2015 Loco Dice Tour by Loco Dice. His single "Falling Again" which was released through DHN Records got the recognition from Tim White by featuring his music productions on his mixes. His EP titled Ambition also played a role in his music career, when his single "Endless" was featured on Vadim Balaev's DJ Top10 on Resident Advisor.

In 2016, American record producer, Kenny Dope, signed him under his record label, Dopewax. Under Dopewax Cornelius released his single "Heaven", which featured Honey Molasses. The single created an international audience for him as he received support from musicians such as Jullian Gomes, MAQman and Tortured Soul.

In 2018, he participated at the Red Bull Music Academy’s 20th Anniversary and in Berlin, where he headlined the night with music producer Pearson Sound. In that same year he worked on a project with Stay True Sounds and released his single "Feel It" featuring Zimbabwean-born singer Jackie Queens, which was nominated in the 2018 Dance Music Awards South Africa for Best House Record of the Year and Best EDM Record of the Year. His single "Keep Your Mouth Shut" has been featured on major local radio stations such as Metro FM, 5FM and The Deeper Shades of House hosted by Lars Behrenroth. He has performed alongside local musicians such as Kat La Kat, Jazzuelle, Sean Munnick, Swizz, Da Capo, Dwson and Bruce Loko. He has also performed in music festivals and venues such as ERA in Cape Town, House22 in Pretoria, Kitcheners in Braamfontein, Bushfire Festival in Swaziland, Oppikoppi, Black Coffee’s Summer Residency at Shimmy Beach in Cape Town, Ryan Murgatroyd’s SWOON at Wonderland Club in Cape Town, Cape Town Electronic Music Festival and the Smoking Dragon Festival in Drakensberg.

In early 2020, he got signed to Armada Music becoming the first black African artist to sign under the label, and only the fifth in South Africa, joining Goldfish, Goodluck, Kyle Cassim and Protoculture. Under the label he released three single tracks, "Diamonds", "Faith" and "Free Your Mind". His single "Diamonds" charted on the UK’s Music Week top10 Cool Hits and later got recognition from International electronic music artists such as Above & Beyond featured it on their Groove Therapy radio show, Eelke Kleijn's Days like Nights Radio, Jono Grant’s Anjuna Family Radio, Chicane’s Sun:Sets Show, Maxim Lany’s residency on BBC One, Shane 54’s International Departures and Armada Music’s Radio Show.

== Awards and nominations ==
Year	Award ceremony	Prize	Result
2018	Dance Music Awards South Africa	Best House Record of the Year	Nominated
2018	Dance Music Awards South Africa	Best EDM Record of the Year	Nominated

== Discography ==
- Ambition (2015)
- Boogie Woogie (2017)
- Studio Experiments (2018)
- Tell Me (2018)
- Feel It Now (2019)
- Diamonds (2020)
- Free Your Mind (2020)
