= Ray Dylan =

South African singer (born 1978)

- Born: Jacobus Frederik Jersich; 15 August 1978 (age 47); Odendaalsrus
- Origin: Odendaalsrus
- Genres: Country
- Occupations: Singer; Songwriter; Producer
- Instrument: Guitar
- Years active: Since 2002
- Label: RDM

Jacobus Frederick Jersich better known by his stage name Ray Dylan (born in Odendaalsrus, South Africa, on 15 August 1978) is a South African singer who sings in Afrikaans and English.

Dylan recorded his debut album New Kid In Town in 2002, but his breakthrough came with the 2006 Afrikaans album Hokaai Stoppie Lorrie followed by Breek Die Ys and the CD / DVD release Hier Binne (Klop ´n Boerehart). In 2010, he received the SAMA (South African Music Award) for the category "Best Country Album of the Year" for his 2009 album Goeie Ou Country.

Ray Dylan married Jessica Erasmus in April 2017.

== Discography ==
- 2002: New Kid in Town
- 2006: Hokaai Stoppie Lorrie
- 2007: Breek Die Ys
- 2008: Hier Binne (Klop 'n Boerehart) (also as DVD)
- 2009: Goeie Ou Country
- 2009: As die Wiel ophou draai
- 2010: Ek Wens Jy's Myne
- 2010: Goeie Ou Country Vol 2
- 2011: Verskietende Sterre
- 2013: Goeie Ou Country in Duet
- 2013: 'n Speciale Aand Met Ray Dylan-
- 2014: 20 Goue Country Treffers
- 2014: Goue Ou Country Vol 3
- 2014: Harte Van Goud
- 2014: Icon
- 2014: Sing Roy Orbison
- 2015: Reg Hier In Die Middel
- 2016: 10 + 10
- 2017: Die Platinum Reeks
- 2017: Uitbasuin
- 2019: "Country Vibes"
