= Sicelo Hlatshwayo =

South African soccer player

Personal information
- Full name: Sicelokuhle Hlatshwayo
- Date of birth: 27 April 1994 (age 32)
- Position: Defender

Team information
- Current team: Golden Arrows
- Number: 22

Senior career*
Years	Team	Apps	(Gls)
–2015	Gamalakhe United		
2015–2017	Mthatha Bucks		
2018–2020	Jomo Cosmos	19	(1)
2020	Polokwane City	4	(0)
2021	Free State Stars	8	(1)
2020–2022	Marumo Gallants	12	(0)
2022–	Golden Arrows	16	(0)
- * Club domestic league appearances and goals as of 1 August 2024

Sicelokuhle Hlatshwayo (born 27 April 1994) is a South African soccer player who plays as a defender for Golden Arrows in the South African Premier Division.

He hails from Newcastle, South Africa. When he attended grade school, he briefly moved to AmaZulu in January 2023, but could not get a school berth in Durban and returned home. He contested the Second Division for Gamalakhe United before joining First Division team Mthatha Bucks in 2015.

After a failed attempt at transferring back to AmaZulu, Hlatshwayo ended up in Jomo Cosmos. He also played for Polokwane City and Free State Stars, making his in the South African Premier Division for Polokwane City.

In the summer of 2021, Hlatshwayo signed for another Premier Division club Marumo Gallants. Despite getting two Man of the Match awards in 2022, Hlatshwayo was dropped from the first team after Dan Malesela took over as manager. He was released in late 2022 as the league took a World Cup break. He was soon picked up by Golden Arrows on a free transfer.

After performing well, rumours arose in the summer of 2023 about a transfer to Orlando Pirates. In December 2023 Hlatshwayo was hospitalized after a grave collision with a teammate during training.
