= DJ Speedsta =

South African DJ, presenter and TV personality

- Also known as: Speedy
- Born: Lesego Nkaiseng; 4 May 1992 (age 34); Vaal Triangle, Gauteng, South Africa
- Origin: Johannesburg, Gauteng, South Africa
- Genre: Hip hop
- Occupations: DJ; TV Personality
- Years active: 2008–present
- Website: www.djspeedsta.joburg

Lesego Nkaiseng (born 4 May 1992), better known as DJ Speedsta, is a South African DJ and TV personality from Johannesburg, South Africa. He is best known for his hit single, "Mayo".

== Early life ==
Lesego Nkaiseng was born in the Vaal Triangle and later based in Johannesburg; he began DJing while in his teens and gained a reputation in the local club and radio scenes before moving into national broadcast roles.

== Career ==
=== Music ===
In April 2015, he joined YFM to host two shows includes: The Hip Hop Floor and Hot 9Nine – Hip Hop. In 2017, he also joined Metro FM to host Absolute Hip Hop alongside Luthando Shosha. On January 25, 2019, his debut studio album Bottlebrush Street was released. The album features Zoocci Coke Dope, Casper Nyovest and Riky Rick. At the 2019 DStv Mzansi Viewers Choice Awards he was nominated for Favourite DJ. Following year at the 2020 South Africa Hip Hop Awards, he was nominated for Best DJ.

On July 9, 2021, he co-host SABC 1 music show Live Amp alongside with DJ Lamiez.

On August 13, 2021, his single "Pardon My French" featuring Zoocci Coke Dope & Lucasraps was released. Speedsta received a nomination for DJ of the Year at the 2021 South African Hip Hop Awards.

=== Radio and television ===
Speedsta has hosted hip-hop shows on major South African youth stations. In 2015 he joined YFM where he presented programmes such as *The Hip Hop Floor* and related shows. In 2017 he was announced as co-host of *Absolute Hip Hop* on Metro FM alongside Luthando "LootLove" Shosha.

In 2021 he joined SABC1 music television programming, co-hosting the revived season of *Live Amp* with DJ Lamiez and later co-hosting the talent show *1's and 2's*.

In March 2022 Speedsta publicly announced his departure from Metro FM after several years at the station.

== Discography ==
=== Studio albums ===
- Bottlebrush Street (2019)

=== Mixtapes ===
Mixtape Title	Mixtape Details
The Guy: Episode 1 - Season 23	Released: 4 December 2015; Label: Sid Records; Formats: Digital download

== Filmography ==
=== Television ===
Year	Title	Role	Notes
2018–present	Live Amp	Himself	Host
	1's and 2's	Himself	Co-host

== Awards and nominations ==
Year	Award Ceremony	Prize	Work/Recipient	Result
2014	South African Hip Hop Awards 2014	DJ of the Year	Himself	Nominated
2015	South African Hip Hop Awards 2015	Best Collabo	Special Somebody (featuring Cassper Nyovest, Riky Rick and Anatii)	Nominated
2015	South African Hip Hop Awards 2015	DJ of the Year	Himself	Nominated
2015	South African Hip Hop Awards 2015	Video of the Year	Special Somebody (featuring Cassper Nyovest, Riky Rick and Anatii)	Nominated
2016	South African Hip Hop Awards 2016	DJ of the Year	Himself	Won
2017	16th Metro FM Music Awards	Best Collaboration	Mayo (featuring Yung Swiss, Tellaman, Shane Eagle and Frank Casino)	Nominated
2017	16th Metro FM Music Awards	Best Hit Single	Mayo (featuring Yung Swiss, Tellaman, Shane Eagle, and Frank Casino)	Nominated
