= LaSauce =

South African singer-songwriter

Sindisiwe Mabogo
- Born: Sindisiwe Mabogo; 4 August 1998 (age 28); Durban, KwaZulu-Natal, South Africa
- Occupation: Singer-songwriter
- Years active: 2017–present
- Musical career
- Also known as: LaSauce
- Origin: Midrand, Gauteng, South Africa
- Genres: Hip hop; R&B
- Instruments: Vocals
- Label: Ambitiouz Entertainment (formerly)
- Website: iG.com/lasauce

Sindisiwe Mabogo (born 4 August 1998), is a South African singer-songwriter known professionally under the alias of LaSauce. She gained recognition after the release of "Phumelela" by Miss Pru DJ.

Mabogo grew up in Durban, KwaZulu-Natal where she picked interest in music at an early age and got drawn to hip hop, R&B and jazz.

In 2017 when she was 18 years old, she got a recording deal with Ambitiouz Entertainment and released her debut single "I Do" with Amanda Black, which surpassed a million views on YouTube after 13 days of its music video release, and it also served as a lead single to her debut studio album Broken Lipstick.

== Awards and nominations ==
| Year | Award ceremony | Category | Recipient/Nominated work | Results | Ref. |
|---|---|---|---|---|---|
| 2021 | South African Music Awards | Best R&B/Soul Album | Sindisiwe | Nominated | |
| 2018 | South African Music Awards | Record of the Year (fan voted) | "I Do" | Nominated | |

== Discography ==
- Broken Lipstick (2017)
- Sindisiwe (2020)
