= Owhelogbo =

Town in Delta State of Nigeria

Owhelogbo is an Isoko town in Isoko North Local Government Council, Delta State, southern Nigeria. It has a humid climate.
