= Let You Know (Sketchy Bongo and Shekhinah song) =

Single by Sketchy Bongo and Shekhinah

from the album Unmasked
- Released: April 6, 2016
- Recorded: 2016
- Genre: EDM
- Length: 3:44
- Label: Ultra Music
- Songwriter(s): Yuvir Pillay; Shekhinah Thandi Donnell
- Producer(s): Sketchy Bongo

Sketchy Bongo singles chronology
"All About It" (2016)	"Let You Know" (2016)	"Get Right" (2016)

Shekhinah singles chronology
"Back To the Beach" (2015)	"Let You Know" (2016)	"Your Eyes" (2016)

Alternative cover

Music video
- "Let You Know" on YouTube

"Let You Know" is a song by South African record producer Sketchy Bongo and South African singer Shekhinah. It was released on 6 April 2016 by Ultra Music and the song is featured on Sketchy Bongo's debut album Unmasked.

== Charts ==
"Let You Know" peaked at number 2 on South Africa's official music chart.

Chart (2016)	Peak position
South Africa (EMA)	2

== Music video ==
The music video for "Let You Know" was released via Ultra Music's YouTube account on April 13, 2016 and has over a million views.
