= Sketchy Bongo =

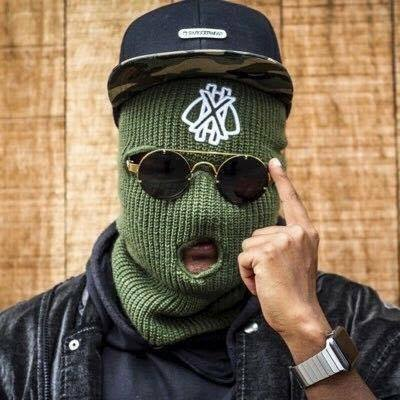
- Sketchy Bongo in his famous ski mask

Background information
- Birth name: Yuvir Pillay
- Born: July 15, 1989 (age 35)
- Origin: Durban, KwaZulu-Natal, South Africa
- Genres: Hip hop; Pop; House; EDM
- Occupations: Record producer; DJ; Songwriter
- Labels: WolfPack; Ultra Music; Sony Music

Yuvir Pillay (born 15 July 1989), better known by his stage name Sketchy Bongo, is a South African record producer, DJ and songwriter from Durban. Bongo has worked with artists such as AKA, Da Les, Shekhinah and Aewon Wolf. His signature is the ski mask that he is constantly seen wearing. Bongo is also the only South African producer to have his own feature on MTV Base. Together with Shekinah, the two created the hit "Let You Know", which got Bongo a record deal with Ultra Music and Sony Music.

== Life and career ==
Yuvir Pillay grew up in KwaZulu-Natal, South Africa. He started producing music from the age of 13. He started off producing mainly hip-hop music, and was influenced by producers like Pharrell Williams and Kanye West. He thereafter moved on to producing house and pop music as well.

Sketchy is part of a group called Wolf Pack, which consists of a group of producers, artists, graphic designers, rappers and kwaito artists. Wolf Pack includes other notable artists such as Aewon Wolf and Kyle Duetsch.

Sketchy's hit collaboration with Shekhinah, "Let You Know", made the BBC radio 1 playlist in the UK. This track turned out to be his big break, and got him his record deal with Ultra Music.

== Discography ==
=== Singles ===
- "Trill" (2014) - Sketchy Bongo ft. HBK & Manon
- "Noises" (2015) - Sketchy Bongo ft. Ameen Harron & Sheen Skaiz
- "Back To The Beach" (2015) - Shekhinah and Kyle Deutsch ft Sketchy Bongo
- "Wild Side" (2016) - Sketchy Bongo ft. Kyle Deutsh & Aewon Wolf
- "Falling" (2015) - Sketchy Bongo ft. Michelle Ostler
- "Shotgun" (2015) - Sketchy Bongo ft. Aewon Wolf & Sheen Skaiz
- "The Bridge" (2015) - Sketchy Bongo ft. Aewon Wolf & Plastic Shadows
- "#Dip" (2015) - Sketchy Bongo ft. Kyle Deutsh & Aewon Wolf
- "Sunlight" (2015) - Sketchy Bongo ft. Kyle Deutsh
- "The Struggle" (2015) - Sketchy Bongo ft. Aewon Wolf
- "Paul Walker" (2015) - Sketchy Bongo
- "Sniff Sniff" (2015) - Sketchy Bongo
- "All About It" (2016) - Sketchy Bongo and Jimmy Nevis
- "Cold Shoulder" (2016) - Sketchy Bongo & Locnville
- "Let You Know" (2016) - Sketchy Bongo & Shekhinah
- "Inside My Head" (2016) - Sketchy Bongo & Danny K
- "Moving On" (2017) - Noma Idols ft. Sketchy Bongo
- "Just Hang On" (2019) - Sketchy Bongo and Shenfm
- "On Fire" (2019) - Sketchy Bongo ft. Yashna

=== Albums ===
- Unmasked (2017)
- Dream Lab 9 (2018)
