= Sicelo Moya =

South African gospel singer

- Born: Sicelo Moya; Nelspruit, South Africa
- Origin: Johannesburg, South Africa
- Genre: Gospel
- Occupation: Singer
- Instruments: Vocals; Piano; Bass; Guitar
- Years active: 1994–present
- Label: Independent

Sicelo Moya is a South African gospel singer best known for his 2013 album Bread of Life, and 2017 album Solid Rock. He has received Awards for Best Gospel Album, Best Worship Song at South African Crown Gospel Music Awards. He was also awarded Best Gospel DVD at the Mpumalanga Gospel Music Awards. He was also nominated for Best Gospel Faith Album at the South African Music Awards.

Moya was born into a musical family in Mpumalanga Province; and started singing in church at an early age and has never looked back.

== Discography ==
- Bread of Life (2013)
- Solid Rock: Live at the Lyric Theatre (2017)
