= Goldie Harvey =

Nigerian professional singer

Background information
- Born: Susan Oluwabimpe Filani; 23 October 1981; Lagos, Nigeria
- Died: 14 February 2013 (aged 31) Lagos, Nigeria
- Genres: R&B, pop, rap, electropop
- Occupations: Singer, rapper, songwriter, television personality
- Instrument: Vocals
- Years active: 2009–2013
- Label: Kennis Music
- Website: www.goldieharvey.net

Susan Oluwabimpe "Goldie" Filani Harvey (23 October 1981 – 14 February 2013) was a Nigerian professional singer and a Big Brother Africa star.

== Personal life ==
Susan Oluwabimpe "Goldie" Filani was married to Andrew Harvey, an engineer based in Malaysia, in 2005, though this fact was not widely known before she died.

Harvey had won several African music awards including a Top Naija Music Award. She appeared on Big Brother Africa in 2012 which was her first TV appearance. She and Kenyan rapper Prezzo, another BBA housemate, appeared to have a close relationship on the show.

== Death and memorial ==
After returning home to Nigeria from the 2013 Grammy Awards in Los Angeles, California, she complained of a headache and was rushed to hospital where she was later pronounced dead. Although there were rumors that she may have used drugs that caused her death, her husband denied that possibility. According to an autopsy conducted by the Department of Pathology and Forensic Medicine at the Lagos State University Teaching Hospital, Harvey died of hypertensive heart disease, which triggered an intracerebral hemorrhage. She was 31 years old at the time of her death, and was buried at the Vaults and Gardens Cemetery, in Ikoyi, Lagos.

== Discography ==
- 2010 – Gold
- 2011 – Gold Reloaded

== Awards and nominations ==
Year	Event	Prize	Nominated work	Result	Ref
2010	Tush Awards	Best Female Musician		Won	
2011	The Headies	Best Collabo	"You Know It" (featuring eLDee)	Nominated	
