= Shekhinah (singer) =

South African pop musician

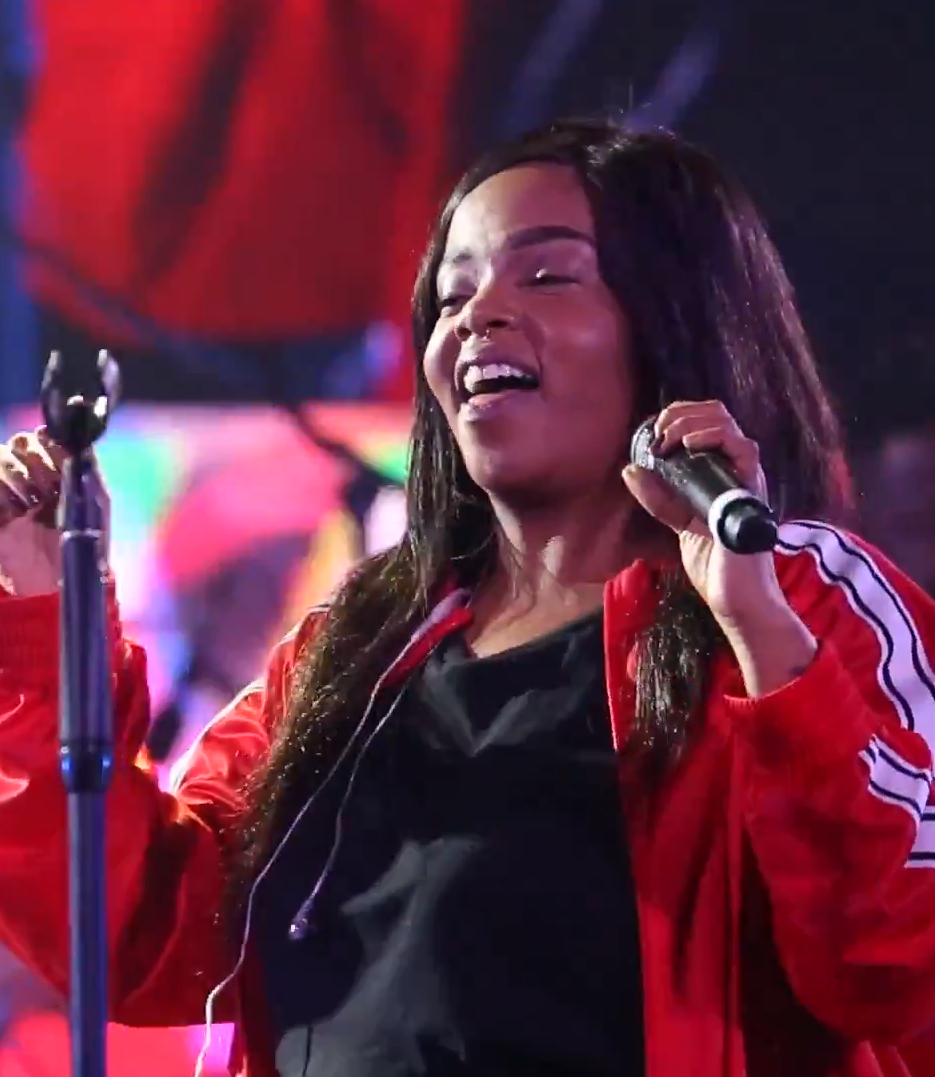

Background information
- Born: Shekhinah Thandi Donnell; 2 October 1994 (age 31); Pietermaritzburg, KwaZulu-Natal, South Africa
- Origin: Durban, KwaZulu-Natal, South Africa
- Genres: Pop; R&B
- Occupation: Singer-songwriter
- Instrument: Vocals
- Years active: 2011–present
- Label: Sony Music
- Website: shekhinahd.com

Shekhinah Thandi Donnell (born 2 October 1994), known mononymously as Shekhinah, is a South African singer-songwriter, who was among the Top 32 of M-Net's Season 7 of SA Idols in 2011 and the Top 6 of Season 8 of SA Idols in 2012.

Her debut studio album Rose Gold (2017), became her best-selling album and was certified Multi-Platinum by the RiSA. Rose Gold produced three number-one singles: "Suited"; "Please Mr." and "Different".

Her second studio album Trouble In Paradise (2021) was certified Gold by the Recording Industry of South Africa (RiSA).

== Career ==
=== 2016-2021: Rose Gold, Trouble In Paradise ===
In 2017, Shekinah released her lead single "Suited", which peaked at No. 1 on South Africa Music charts and was certified diamond by the Recording Industry of South Africa (RiSA) later that year. In 2018, "Please Mr" and "Different" were released, with "Please Mr" acquiring a gold certification from RiSA.

On October 6, 2017, her debut studio album Rose Gold was released in South Africa by Sony Music Entertainment Africa. Written solely by Shekinah, and including production credits from David Scott, DJ Maphorisa, Luke Goliath and Mae N. Maejor, the result was an afro-pop and rnb record. Rose Gold went on to become her best-selling album and was certified multi-platinum in South Africa, primarily through the success of the three singles spawned: "Suited"; "Please Mr." and "Different".

The album earned her 6 nominations at the 2018 South African Music Awards, winning the New-comer of the Year, Album of the Year, and Female Artist of the Year awards.

On 7 May 2021, her second studio album Trouble In Paradise, was released in South Africa. The album was supported by two singles; "Fixate" and "Tide", and reached a Gold certification from the Recording Industry of South Africa (RiSA).

"Fixate" debuted at number 1 on RAMS Chart.

=== 2023-present: Upcoming album ===
In early March 2023, Shekinah announced her upcoming third studio album, and its lead single "Risk" featuring Moliy. The single was released on 22 March 2024. In the same year, she also collaborated with Jameson Irish Whiskey for their Distilled Sounds Program alongside Indian hip-hop duo Seedhe Maut. The program also featured other global music artists like Anderson .Paak and Kaiit among others.

"Risk" debuted No. 9 on the Local Radio Chart Top 10.

== Discography ==
=== Singles ===
List of singles as lead artist, with selected chart positions and certifications, showing year released and album name
Title	Year	Peak chart positions	Certification	Album
Title	Year	South Africa (EMA)	Certification	Album
"Back To The Beach" (with Kyle Deutsch )	2015		RiSA: Gold	Non-album single
"Let You Know" (with Sketchy Bongo )	2015	2	—	Unmasked
"Suited"	2017	1	RiSA: Diamond	Rose Gold
"Please Mr"	2018	1	RiSA: Platinum	Rose Gold
"Different"	2018	1	RiSA: Gold	Rose Gold
"Risk" (ft. Moliy )	2024	3		Less Trouble
"Steady"	2024	—		Less Trouble
"—" denotes a recording that did not chart or was not released in that territory.

List of singles as featured artist, with selected chart positions and certifications, showing year released and album name
Title	Year	Peak chart positions	Certifications	Album
Title	Year	ZA	Certifications	Album
"Whipped" (Tellaman ft. Shekhinah and Nasty C )	2019	1	5× Platinum	God Decides
"God Laughs" (A-Reece ft. Sjava and Shekhinah )	2023	16		P2: The Big Hearted Bad Guy

=== Studio albums ===
List of studio albums, with selected information
Title	Album details	Certification
Rose Gold	Released: 6 October 2017; Label: Sony Music Entertainment Africa; Formats: CD, Digital download	RISA: Multi-Platinum
Trouble In Paradise	Released: 7 May 2021; Label: Sony Music Entertainment Africa; Formats: CD, Music download, Streaming	RiSA: Gold
Less Trouble	Released: 8 August 2025; Label: Self-released; Formats: Music download, Streaming	

=== Extended plays ===
List of studio albums, with selected information
Title	Album details	Certification
Love on Repeat, Vol. 1	Released: 5 June 2026; Label: Formats: Music download, Streaming	

== Awards and nominations ==
Shekhinah awards and nominations
Awards and nominations
Award	Wins	Nominations
Metro FM Music Awards	0	1
South African Music Awards	4	5
MTV Africa Music Awards	1	
MTV European Music Awards	0	1
All Africa Music Awards	2	5
1st KZN Entertainment Awards	0	1
Basadi in Music Awards	2	1

Totals (Note: Certain award groups do not simply award one winner. They acknowledge several different recipients, have runners-up, and have third place. Since this is a specific recognition and is different from losing an award, runner-up mentions are considered wins in this award tally. For simplification and to avoid errors, each award in this list has been presumed to have had a prior nomination.)
- Wins: 9
- Nominations: 14

=== Basadi in Music Awards ===
Year	Nominee / work	Award	Result	Ref.
2022	Herself	SAMPRA Highest Airplay	Won	
2022	Herself	Pop Artist of the Year	Nominated	
2024	Herself	Pop Artist of the Year	Won	

=== Metro FM Music Awards ===
Year	Nominee / work	Award	Result
2016	Back to the Beach (Shekhinah & Kyle Deutsch)	Best Hit Single	Nominated

=== South African Music Awards ===
Year	Nominee / work	Award	Result
2016	Back to the Beach (Shekhinah & Kyle Deutsch)	Best Collaboration	Nominated
2018	Rose Gold	Best Pop Album	Nominated
2018	Rose Gold	Best Produced Album	Nominated
2018	Rose Gold	Record of the Year	Nominated
2018	Rose Gold	New Comer of the Year	Won
2018	Rose Gold	Album of the Year	Won
2018	Rose Gold	Female Artist of the Year	Won
2022	Trouble in Paradise	Best Pop Album	Won
2022	Trouble in Paradise	Female Artist of the Year	Nominated

=== MTV Africa Music Awards ===
Year	Nominee / work	Award	Result
2016	Shekhinah & Kyle Deutsch	Best Pop & Alternative	Won

=== MTV European Music Awards ===
Year	Nominee / work	Award	Result
2018	Shekhinah	Best African Act	Nominated

=== All Africa Music Awards ===
Year	Nominee / work	Award	Result
2018	Rose Gold		
2018	Rose Gold	Album of the Year	Nominated
2018	Rose Gold	Best African Dance & Choreography	Nominated
2018	Rose Gold	Best Artiste/Group In African RnB & Soul	Nominated
2018	Rose Gold	Revelation Of The African Continent	Nominated
2018	Rose Gold	Best Female Artist in Southern Africa	Won
2018	Rose Gold	Songwriter Of The Year	Won
2021	"Fixate"	Best Female Artist in South Africa	Nominated

=== KZN Entertainment Awards ===
Year	Nominee / work	Award	Result
2020	Herself	Best Female Artist	Nominated
