= Yung Swiss =

South African hip hop artist

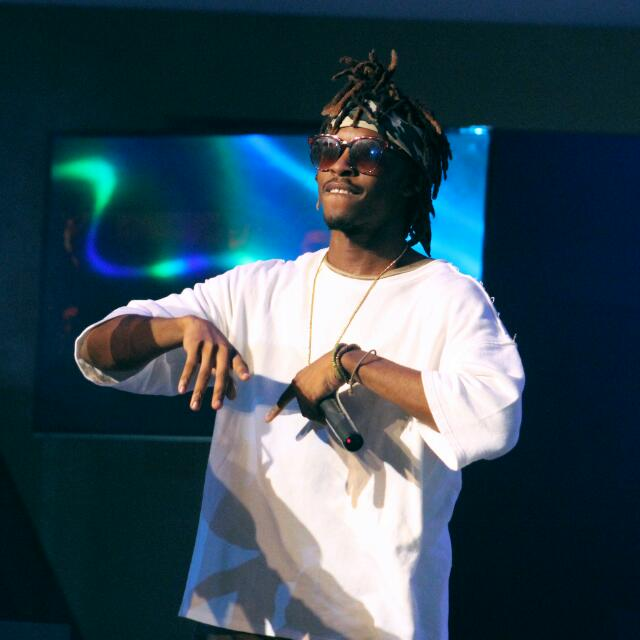
- Yung Swiss performing at SA Hip Hop Awards, December 2016

Background information
- Also known as: Xikwembu
- Born: Steve Dang
- Origin: Rosettenville, Johannesburg, South Africa
- Genres: Hip hop, Trap music
- Occupations: Rapper; Singer; Songwriter
- Instrument: Vocals
- Years active: 2014–present

Steve Dang, known professionally as Yung Swiss, is a South African based rapper, singer and songwriter. He is a Johannesburg-based recording artist from Rosettenville 2190. Born in Cameroon.

== Career ==
In early 2015, Swiss released his first single with South African rap sensation Reason, titled 'I Love It'. The single made its debut on South Africa's leading youth radio station, Yfm, while the music video for said single debut on the infamous MTV Base.

Swiss later released his second single 'David Genaro', from his EP titled The Desiree Project, which was a tribute to actor Jamie Bartlett for his role as puppet master and mogul-villain "David Genaro", which he plays in the popular local drama series, Rhythm City.

Yung Swiss's "Mayo" chorus which was a freestyle on DJ Speedsta's single is his highest charting hit single as it was the most played record on South African radio stations for 12 weeks in a row, as well as being #1 on the African Chart on Beat 99 FM Nigeria. Mayo also went Gold 10 Months after its official release.

In 2015, Yung Swiss released his first single with South African rapper Reason, titled I Love It, which made its debut on the radio station YFM. It also aired on other radio stations such as 5FM. The I love it music debuted on MTV BASE Africa.

Yung Swiss released the remix for his second single #DavidGenaroRemix on 8 April 2016 which was the most downloaded track of the week on Slikour OnLife.

Yung Swiss released a promotional single "Locked Up" for his debut project Bottom Baby featuring Cameroon's powerhouse Stanley Enow The track received instant positive reviews, as he had crossed International borders so early in his career.

On 4 November 2016, Yung Swiss released his third single titled "The High" which climbed on charts across radio stations and peaked at #1 on YFM's Hot99HipHop and #1 on 5FM's The Stir Up.

On 25 November 2016, Swiss released his debut project an EP titled Bottom Baby based on his personal life and the struggles and challenges he encountered during his rise in the industry. Bottom Baby's singles include "The High", "Jungle" ft. K.O, "Where The Work At" ft. Nadia Nakai & "Locked Up" ft Stanley Enow.

Yung Swiss has also collaborated with fellow labelmates Ricky Tyler & Astryd Brown.

== Discography ==
=== Extended plays ===
Title	EP details
Bottom Baby	Released:25 November 2016; Label: Playground Productions; Formats: Digital download
Bottom baby 2	Released:10 October 2018; Label: playground productions; Formats: Digital download

=== Singles ===
Year	Title
2015	"I Love It " (featuring Reason) [Produced by Playground Productions]
2015	"David Genaro" [Produced by Playground Productions]
2016	"David Genaro Remix" (featuring Dj Speedsta, Reason, Ginger Trill) [Produced by Playground Productions]
2016	"Locked Up" (featuring Stanley Enow) [Produced by Playground Productions]
2016	"The High" [Produced by Playground Productions]

=== Singles as featured artist ===
Year	Title	Album
2016	"Mayo" (DJ Speedsta featuring Yung Swiss, Tellaman Shane Eagle, Frank Casino) [Produced by Gemini Major]	
2016	"Paying" (Nadia Nakai featuring Yung Swiss) [Produced by Playground Productions]	Bragga
