= List of awards and nominations received by Cassper Nyovest =

Cassper Nyovest awards and nominations
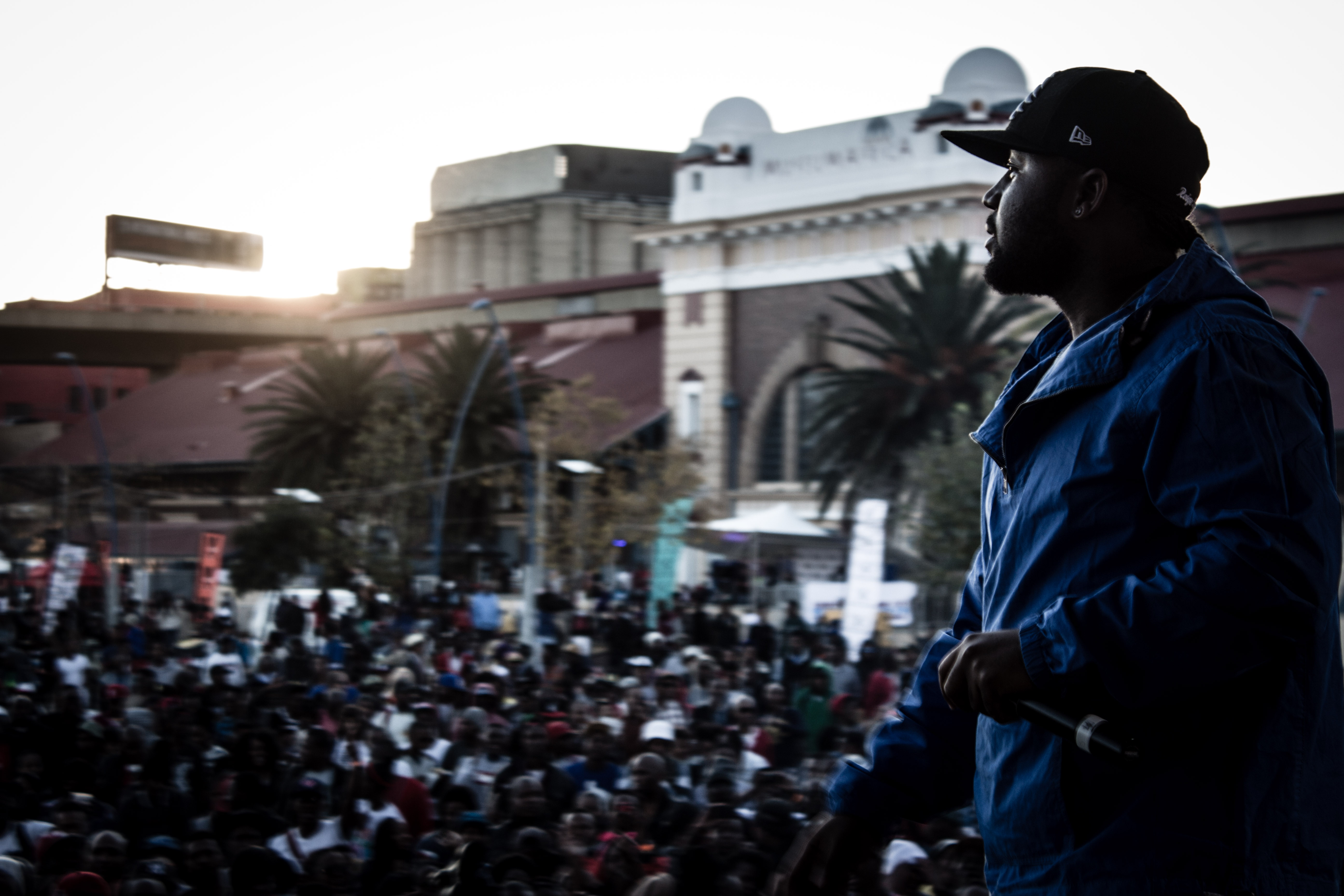
- Cassper Nyovest performing in 2014
Awards and nominations
Award	Wins	Nominations
WatsUp TV Africa Music Video Awards	0	4
Channel O Music Video Awards	3	5
Metro FM Awards	6	9
South African Music Awards	2	4
South African Hip Hop Awards	0	10
MTV Africa Music Awards	2	2
Africa Musiq Magazine Awards	1	6
All Africa Music Awards	2	4
Namibia Annual Music Awards (NAMAs) Pan-African Artist of the Year	1	1
Urban Music People, UMP Awards Best SADC Act 2017	1	1
BET AWARDS	1	2
African Muzik Magazine Awards	0	1

Totals (Note: Certain award groups do not simply award one winner. They acknowledge several different recipients, have runners-up, and have third place. Since this is a specific recognition and is different from losing an award, runner-up mentions are considered wins in this award tally. For simplification and to avoid errors, each award in this list has been presumed to have had a prior nomination.)
- Wins: 34
- Nominations: 49

This is a list of awards and nominations received by Cassper Nyovest, a South African recording artist and record producer.

== African Muzik Magazine Awards ==
Year	Nominee / work	Award	Result	Ref.
2021	Himself	Best Male Southern Africa	Nominated	

== WatsUp TV Africa Music Video Awards ==
Year	Nominee / work	Award	Result	Ref
2016	War Ready	African Video of the Year	Nominated	
2016	War Ready	Best African Hip Hop Video	Nominated	
2016	War Ready	Best African Performance	Nominated	
2016	War Ready	Best African Male Video	Nominated	
2016	War Ready	Best South African Video	Won	

== Channel O Music Video Awards ==
Year	Nominee / work	Award	Result	Ref
2014	"Doc Shebeleza"	Most Gifted Male	Won	
2014	"Doc Shebeleza"	Most Gifted Newcomer	Nominated	
2014	"Doc Shebeleza"	Most Gifted Hip Hop	Nominated	
2014	"Doc Shebeleza"	Most Gifted Southern Artist	Won	
2014	"Doc Shebeleza"	Most Gifted Video of the Year	Won	

== Metro FM Awards ==
Year	Nominee / work	Award	Result	Ref
2015	Tsholofelo	Best Hip Hop Album	Won	
2015	Tsholofelo	Best Male Album	Won	
2015	"Doc Shebeleza"	Best Hit Single	Won	
2015	"Doc Shebeleza"	Song of the Year	Won	
2015	"Doc Shebeleza"	Best Music Video	Nominated	
2015	"Doc Shebeleza" (Remix)	Best Remix	Nominated	
2015	Listener's Choice Award	Himself	Won	
2025	"Umusa"	Best African Pop Song	Pending	
2025	"Skuta Baba (Remix)"	Song of the Year	Pending	
2025	"Skuta Baba (Remix)"	Best Collaboration Song	Pending	

== South African Music Awards ==
Year	Recipient(s) and nominee(s)	Category	Results	Ref.
2015	Himself	Male Artist of the Year	Nominated	
2015	Himself	Newcomer of the Year	Won	
2015	Tsholofelo	Best Rap Album	Nominated	
2015	Tsholofelo	Album of the Year	Nominated	
2015	Gusheshe (featuring Okmalumkoolkat)	Best Collaboration	Nominated	
2017	"THAPELO MASHIMBYI" (with Kwesta)	Highest Airplay of the Year	Won	

== SA Hip Hop Awards ==
Year	Nominee / work	Award	Result	Ref
2013	"Gusheshe"	Song of the Year	Won	
2013	"Gusheshe"	Best Collaboration	Won	
2013	"Gusheshe"	Video of the Year	Won	
2013	"Gusheshe"	Best Freshman	Won	
2014	Tsholofelo	Album of the Year	Won	
2014	Tsholofelo	Best Digital Sales	Won	
2014	"Doc Shebeleza"	Song of the Year	Won	
2014	"Doc Shebeleza"	Video of the Year	Nominated	
2014	Himself	Most Valuable Artist	Nominated	
2014	Himself	Hustler of the Year	Nominated	
2014	Himself	Best Male	Nominated	
2020	"Good for That"	Song of the Year	Won	
2020	A.M.N (Any Minute Now)	Album of the Year	Won	
2021	Himself	Artist of the Decade	Won	

== MTV Africa Music Awards ==
Year	Nominee / work	Award	Result
2015	Himself	Best Hip Hop	Won
2016	Himself	Best Live Act	Won
2021	Himself	Best Fan Base	Pending

== Nigeria Entertainment Awards ==
Year	Nominee / work	Award	Result	Ref
2017	"Himself"	Best Male African Artist	Nominated	

== SA AmaPiano Music Awards ==
Year	Nominee / work	Award	Result
2021	Himself	Friends of AmaPiano	Nominated
