= Cassper Nyovest discography =

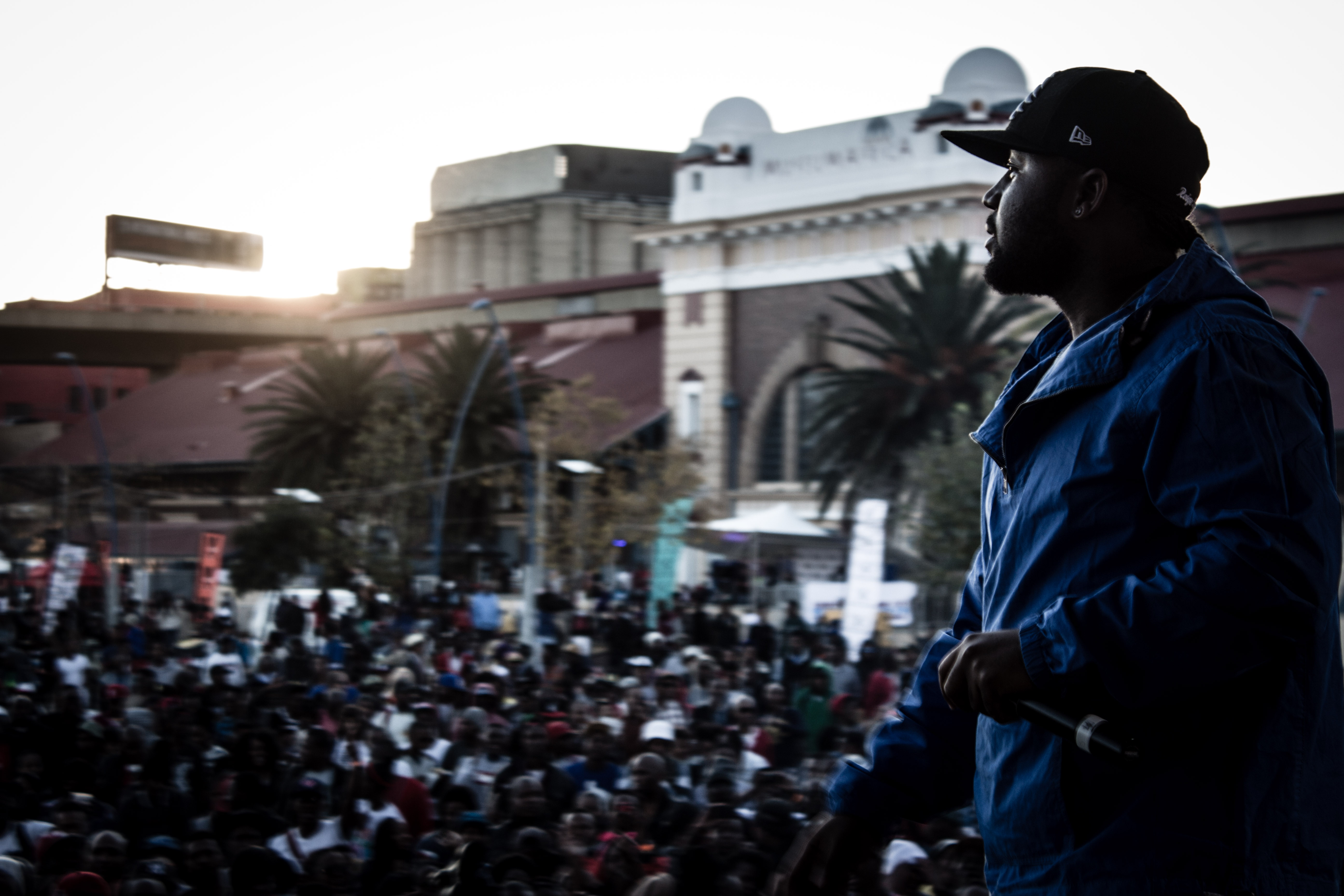
- Studio albums: 7
- Singles: 19
- Music videos: 23

South African recording artist Cassper Nyovest has released 7 studio albums, 24 singles and 12 music videos. Nyovest's music has been released on record labels Universal Music South Africa and Family Tree Records.

== Studio albums ==
List of albums, with selected details, sales figures and certifications
| Title | Album details | Certifications |
|---|---|---|
| Tsholofelo | Released: 18 July 2014 (SA); Label: Family Tree, Kalawa Jazmee Records, Universal Music South Africa; Formats: CD, digital download | RiSA: Platinum |
| Refiloe | Released: 31 October 2015 (SA); Label: Family Tree, Universal Music South Africa; Formats: CD, digital download | RiSA: Platinum |
| Thuto | Released: 5 May 2017 (World); Label: Family Tree; Formats: CD, digital download | RiSA: Gold |
| Sweet and Short | Released: 30 November 2018; Label: Family Tree; Formats: CD, digital download, Streaming | RiSA: Platinum |
| A.M.N (Any Minute Now) | Released: 11 September 2020; Label: Family Tree; Formats: CD, digital download | RiSA: Aluminum |
| Sweet and Short 2.0 | Released: 30 June 2021; Label: Family Tree; Formats: CD, digital download | |
| Solomon | Released : 15 September 2023; Label: Family Tree; Formats: Digital Download, Streaming | |

== Singles ==
List of singles, showing year released and album name
| Title | Year | Peak chart positions | | Album |
| Title | Year | EMA | 5FM Top 40 | Album |
|---|---|---|---|---|
| "Gusheshe" | 2013 | — | — | Tsholofelo |
| "Doc Shebeleza" | 2014 | 4 | 1 | Tsholofelo |
| "Phumakim" | 2014 | 2 | 1 | Tsholofelo |
| "Ghetto" (featuring DJ Drama and Anatii) | 2015 | | | Tsholofelo |
| "Mama I Made It (#MIMI)" | 2015 | | 1 | Refiloe |
| "Le Mpitse" (featuring Riky Rick) | 2015 | | | Refiloe |
| "Malome" (featuring Mahotella Queens) | 2016 | | | Refiloe |
| "War Ready" | 2016 | | | Refiloe |
| "428 to L.A" (featuring Casey Veggies) | 2016 | | | Refiloe |
| "Monate So" (featuring Doc Shebeleza) | 2016 | | | Refiloe |
| "Tito Mboweni" | 2017 | | | Thuto |
| "Destiny" (featuring Goapele) | 2017 | | | Thuto |
| "Superman" (featuring Tshepo Tshola) | 2017 | | | Thuto |
| "Baby Girl" | 2017 | | | Thuto |
| "Push Through The Pain" | 2018 | | | Thuto |
| "Check On You" (featuring Davido | 2018 | | | Non-album single |
| "Gets Getsa 2.0" | 2018 | | | Sweet and Short |
| "Remote Control" (featuring DJ Sumbody) | 2019 | | | Sweet and Short |
| "Move For Me" (featuring Boskaskie) | 2019 | | | Sweet and Short |
| "Good For That" | 2020 | | | A.M.N (Any Minute Now) |
| "Summer Love" (with Raye) | 2022 | | | Non-album single |
| "018" (featuring Maglera Doe Boy) | 2023 | | | Solomon |
"—" denotes a recording that did not chart or was not released in that territory.
