= Pink Panther (Tshego album) =

Studio album by Tshego
- Released: 29 August 2019
- Recorded: 2019
- Venue: South Africa
- Studio: Universal Music Africa Studios
- Genre: Pop; R&B; hip hop
- Length: 51:08
- Label: Twenty Five Eight Entertainment; Universal Music South Africa
- Producer: Yaw Bannerman; Gemini Major; Lunatik

Tshego chronology
Since 1990 (2014)	Pink Panther (2019)

Singles from Pink Panther
- 1. "No Ties" Released: July 26, 2019

Pink Panther is the debut album by South African R&B singer Tshego. The album was released on 29 August 2019, through Twenty Five Eight Entertainment, and licensed through Universal Music South Africa. The album was executively produced by Tshego, and Alie Keys; with additional production from Yaw Bannerman, Gemini Major, and Lunatik. It features guest appearances from King Monada, Riky Rick, Kwesta, Black Class, Tellaman, Thabsie, Focalistic, and Frank Casino.

== Background ==
Following his exit from Family Tree in 2018, after winning a court case against the label owner Cassper Nyovest; and gained back ownership of all his masters; released under the label. In 2019, Tshego imprint Twenty Five Eight Entertainment; signed a licensing deal with Universal Music Africa; and released his first single "No Ties", off Pink Panther project; through Universal Music Africa.

On 5 June 2019, before the release of "No Ties", he announced his plans on releasing his debut studio album in July.

On 4 October 2019, he held a listening session at African Beer Emporium in Pretoria. With guess artist from Riky Rick, Nadia Nakai, Gemini Major, Major League DJz, Focalistic, 25K, DBN Gogo, DJ Venom, DJ Banques, DJ Smokes, among others.

== Promotion ==
On September 10, 2020, he launched Pink Panther clothing, in partnership with Factorie, and available for purchase at RoseBank.

== Singles ==
On 26 July 2019, he released the lead single of the album, "No Ties", featuring King Monada, accompanied by a music video. In November 2019, the single was certified gold by the Recording Industry of South Africa (RISA); On 9 July 2020, his single "No Ties" was announced among the nominees at the 26th SAMA Awards for Record of the Year.

On 21 January 2020, Tshego released an amapiano remix of "No Ties", with guess vocals from King Monada, and MFR Souls.

== Accolades ==
Year(s)	Award(s)	Category(s)	Result(s)
2020	South African Music Awards	Best R&B/Soul Album	Nominated

== Track listing ==
Credits adapted from Genius.

No.	Title	Writer(s)	Producer(s)	Length
1.	"A Little While"	Tshegofatso Ketshabile	Yaw Bannerman	3:00
2.	"Right Now"	Tshegofatso Ketshabile	Alie Keys; Gemini Major	3:39
3.	"No Ties" (featuring. King Monada)	Tshegofatso Ketshabile; Khutso Steven Kgatle	Alie Keys; Tshego	3:58
4.	"Me and You" (featuring. Riky Rick)	Tshegofatso; Rikhado Ribeca Makhado	Tshego	3:22
5.	"With My Bro’s"	Tshegofatso Ketshabile	Alie Keys; Tshego	2:41
6.	"Ubumnandi" (featuring. BLACK CASS & Kwesta)	Tshegofatso; BLACK CASS; Senzo Vilakazi	Lunatik Beatz; Alie Keys	3:40
7.	"On You" (featuring. Tellaman)	Tshegofatso; Thelumusa Samuel Owen	Alie Keys; Tshego	5:08
8.	"On God"	Tshegofatso Ketshabile	Tshego; Alie Keys	3:16
9.	"Together" (featuring. Focalistic)	Tshegofatso; Lethabo Sebetso	Tshego	3:56
10.	"Waves"	Tshegofatso Ketshabile	Alie Keys; Gemini Major; Tshego	2:56
11.	"Playing" (featuring. Thabsie)	Tshegofatso; Bathabise Biyela	Alie Keys; Tshego	3:28
12.	"I Been Good"	Tshegofatso Ketshabile	Tshego	3:17
13.	"The Touch" (Interlude)	Tshegofatso Ketshabile	Alie Keys; Tshego	2:48
14.	"The Touch" (featuring. Frank Casino & Riky Rick)	Tshegofatso; Nhlanhla Tshabalala; Rikhado	Tshego	3:45
15.	"You Don’t Have To"	Tshegofatso Ketshabile	Yaw Bannerman	2:14
Total length:				51:08

== Personnel ==
- Tshegofatso Ketshabile – vocals, songwriting, executive producer, production (3, 4, 5, 7, 8, 9, 11, 12, 13, 14)
- Alie Keys – executive producer, production (2, 3, 5, 6, 7, 8, 9, 11, 12, 13, 14)
- Yaw Bannerman - production (tracks 1, 15)
- Gemini Major – production (tracks 2, 10)
- Lunatik Beatz – production (tracks 6)

== Release history ==
Region	Date	Format	Label
Various	August 29, 2019	CD; Digital download; streaming	Twenty Five Eight Entertainment; Universal Music Group
