= No Ties (Tshego song) =

2019 single by Tshego

Single by Tshego featuring King Monada

from the album Pink Panther
- Released: July 26, 2019
- Recorded: 2019
- Genre: Dancehall; R&B; Amapiano
- Label: Twenty Five Eight Entertainment; Universal Music South Africa (a division of Universal Music Group)
- Songwriter(s): Tshegofatso Ketshabile
- Producer(s): Alie Keys; Tshego

"No Ties" is a song by South African R&B singer Tshego, released as the only single from his first studio album Pink Panther. The song was produced by South African record producer Alie Keys and Tshego. It was ranked at number 12 on OkayAfrica's list of the 20 Best South African Songs of 2019. An amapiano remix with an additional feature from South African amapiano musical duo MFR Souls was released on 7 February 2020. The song received a nomination at the 26th South African Music Awards for Record of the Year in 2020.

== Background ==
Following his exit from Family Tree in 2018, after winning a court case against the label owner, Cassper Nyovest, he got back full ownership of all his masters. They were then released under the label, and he took them off all stores. His imprint Twenty Five Eight Entertainment signed a licensing deal with Universal Music Africa before the release of, "No Ties" from the Pink Panther project; through Universal Music.

== Music video ==
No Ties (Amapiano remix) cover art

The music video was released on 9 October 2019. As of December 2021, the music video had 2.1 million views on YouTube.

== Commercial performance ==
On 23 December 2019, "No Ties" peaked at number nine on Apple Music Top 100 R&B/Soul Songs in South Africa. On 20 October 2019, it debuted at number three on South Africa iTunes Radio Top 100 R&B/Soul Songs. "No Ties" is Tshego's most popular record with over 1.6 million streams on Spotify as of December 2021. OkayAfrica included the song in their list of 50 Best Songs Of 2019.

== Accolades ==
Awards and nominations for "No Ties"
Year	Organization	Award	Result
2020	South African Music Awards	Record of the Year	Nominated

== Credits and personnel ==
Credits adapted from Genius.

- Tshego – vocals, songwriting, producer
- King Monada – vocals, songwriting
- MFR Souls
  - Tumelo Nedondwe – vocals, songwriting (remix only)
  - Tumelo Mabe – vocals, songwriting (remix only)
- Alie Keys - production

== Certifications ==
Region	Certification	Certified units/Sales
South Africa (RiSA)	Gold	15,000

== Release history ==
Region	Date	Format	Label	Ref.
Various	26 July 2019	Digital download; streaming	Twenty Five Eight Entertainment; Universal Music Group Africa	
