= Doc Shebeleza (song) =

2014 single by Cassper Nyovest

Single by Cassper Nyovest

from the album Tsholofelo
- Released: 17 January 2014
- Recorded: 2013
- Genre: Hip hop, Trap
- Length: 3:57 (Single version); 3:51 (Album version)
- Label: Family Tree
- Songwriter(s): Refiloe Maele Phoolo
- Producer(s): Fenesse (Sean Craig Beats)

Cassper Nyovest singles chronology
"Gusheshe" (2013)	"Doc Shebeleza" (2014)	"Phumakim" (2014)

Music video
- "Doc Shebeleza" on YouTube

Doc Shebeleza is the second official single from Cassper Nyovest's debut LP Tsholofelo. The song is a tribute to South African kwaito veteran, Doc Shebeleza. It debuted at number 4 on South Africa's official music chart.

Before its release, Doc Shebeleza was teased a couple of times at live performances. It was made available for free downloads and has been downloaded over 200,000 times. The song peaked at number 1 on the 5FM Top 40 chart.

The remix for Doc Shebeleza was released on 3 November 2014. It was produced by Anatii and features a guest verse from rapper Talib Kweli.

== Composition ==
Production was entirely handled by Fenesse formerly known as Sean Craig Beats. The African Hip Hop Blog described the song as, "A high energy track with a trap beat very similar to any of Lex Luger's last 20 offerings, including a hilarious 4 bar sequence where he acknowledges his desire to get with Minnie Dlamini".

At two points the song also interpolates the Migos song “Versace.”

== Artwork ==
The artwork for the single was released on 8 January 2014 via Twitter.

== DStv "Feel Every Moment" Campaign ==
On 21 August 2014, Cassper Nyovest announced that "Doc Shebeleza" was licensed by DStv for their "Feel Every Moment" campaign. The campaign includes an advertisement which embodies the song. The ad ran from August 2014 to February 2015.

== Remix ==
In October 2014, Nyovest announced that he had been working with American rapper Talib Kweli on the official remix for Doc Shebeleza. It was released on 3 November 2014 as a free digital download.

"Doc Shebeleza (Remix)"

Single by Cassper Nyovest featuring Talib Kweli
- Released: 3 November 2014
- Recorded: 2014
- Genre: Trap
- Length: 4:09
- Songwriter(s): Refiloe Maele Phoolo; Talib Kweli Greene
- Producer(s): Anatii: Fenesse (Sean Craig Beats)

Cassper Nyovest singles chronology
"Tsibip" (2014)	"Doc Shebeleza (Remix)" (2014)

== Accolades ==
=== Channel O Music Video Awards ===
Year	Nominee / work	Award	Result	Ref
2014	"Doc Shebeleza"	Most Gifted Male	Won	
2014	"Doc Shebeleza"	Most Gifted Newcomer	Nominated	
2014	"Doc Shebeleza"	Most Gifted Hip Hop	Nominated	
2014	"Doc Shebeleza"	Most Gifted Southern Artist	Won	
2014	"Doc Shebeleza"	Most Gifted Video of the Year	Won	

=== SA Hip Hop Awards ===
Year	Nominee / work	Award	Result
2014	"Doc Shebeleza"	Song of the Year	Won
2014	"Doc Shebeleza"	Video of the Year	Nominated

== Music video ==
The music video premiered on Channel O on 25 April 2014. It was directed by Nicky Campos and Cassper Nyovest. It features cameos from Doc Shebeleza, iFANi, Slikour, L-Tido, HHP, Smashis, Riky Rick, Maggz, Blayze, DJ Switch, Major League DJz and Fenesse (Sean Craig Beats).

== Charts ==
Chart (2014)	Peak position
South Africa (EMA)	4
