= MC Prayer =

Studio album by Tuks
- Released: 2006
- Recorded: 2005/2006
- Genre: Hip Hop
- Label: EMI Records
- Producer: Thaso Tsotetsi

Singles from MC Prayer
- 1. "Monate Thwaa"; 2. "Ticket To Jozi"

MC Prayer is the second studio album of Motswako hip-hop artist Tuks, released in 2006 in South Africa through EMI Records as the follow-up to his SAMA award-winning debut Mafoko A Me.

== Critical reception ==
The album was well received in general with Channel24 giving it a 3/5 rating and stating: "Even with standout hits missing, he does not completely disappoint. The Maf Town rapper has mixed intelligent lyrics with great beats to create an album worth owning. Even if listeners don't verstaan seTswana, they'll surely enjoy the music from “Remember Where?”, “Monate Thwaa”, “Lebotha” and more."

== Sales performance ==
MC Prayer was certified Gold by RiSA, having sold over 20 000 units

== Accolades ==
MC Prayer won at the Metro FM Music Awards for Best Hip-Hop Album in 2007.

== Track listing ==
1. "Remember Where?" - 3:30
2. "Kgotsi Tsa Kasi" - 3:30
3. "What You Want" ft Ken-i - 3:32
4. "Monate Thwaa" - 5:12
5. "Carabian Chick" ft Shati - 3:55
6. "Easy Just" - 3:50
7. "Ticket To Jozi" ft Thembisile - 4:37
8. "One" - 1:58
9. "O Sule ..." - 2:53
10. "Skit" - 0:37
11. "Lebotha" - 3:47
12. "To Every Woman" ft Thab'Sile - 4:34
13. "Lejuta" - 4:48
14. "Who I am" - 3:56
15. "Journey" ft Terry Gunshots and Ndlandla - 4:13
16. "Le Go Chele" - 3:03
17. "Motswako Back" - 3:54
18. "MC Prayer" - 3:59
19. "Eyes Shut" - 3:28
