= Nadia Naked =

2019 studio album by Nadia Nakai

Studio album by Nadia Nakai
- Released: 2 June 2019
- Recorded: 2016–2019
- Genre: Hip-hop
- Length: 56:59
- Label: Family Tree Records
- Producer: Various: Cassper Nyovest; Tshego; Gemini Major; Playground Productions; Nadia Nakai (also exec.)

Nadia Nakai chronology
Bragga (EP) (2016)	Nadia Naked (2019)	Nadia Naked (Deluxe) (2020)

Singles from Naked Nadia
- 1. "Imma Boss" Released: 29 May 2019; 2. "Kreatures" Released: 2 June 2019

Nadia Naked is the debut album by South African rapper Nadia Nakai. The album was released on 2 June 2019, by Family Tree Records. It features guest appearances by Cassper Nyovest, Khuli Chana, Kwesta, Lady Zamar, Tshego and Stefflon Don.

== Background ==
In 2016, Nakai released her first EP, titled Bragga, and signed a new record deal with Family Tree Records. Three years later, she explained that she wanted to create a personal album rather than repeating her earlier party songs.

== Artwork and title ==
The artwork used for the album was shot by Jiten Ramlal and designed by Jabu Nkosi. The album cover features Nakai nude. On May 3, 2019, Nakai revealed the title and the release date of the album on Twitter. Nakai has said that the title combines her name and the idea that her performances are so emotionally revealing that she seems "naked".

== Critical reception ==
Michael Highly of Dope Off The Press observed that Nakai "feels seasoned and much more confident throughout the album".

== Accolades ==
Year	Nominee / work	Award	Result	Ref.
2019	Nadia Naked	Album of the Year in Africa	Won	

== Track listing ==
All tracks are written by Nadia Nakai Kandava, except where noted.

No.	Title	Writer(s)	Length
1.	"Intro"		2:06
2.	"Africa"		2:19
3.	"Imma Boss"		2:36
4.	"Big Pun"		3:08
5.	"Trappy"		2:08
6.	"Yaas Bitch"		3:22
7.	"Naaa Meaan" (featuring Cassper Nyovest)	Kandava; Refiloe Maele Phoolo	3:48
8.	"On the Block" (featuring Khuli Chana)	Kandava; Khulane Morule	3:32
9.	"Darkness Defined" (featuring Lady Zamar)	Kandava; Yamikani Janet Banda	4:16
10.	"Chankura" (featuring Cassper Nyovest)	Kandava; Phoolo	2:43
11.	"More Drugs" (featuring Tshego)	Kandava; Tshegofatso Ketshabile	4:23
12.	"Rap Bitches"		3:08
13.	"Love"		3:24
14.	"Amai"		3:07
15.	"Kreatures" (featuring Kwesta And Sio)	Kandava; Senzo Mfundo Vilakazi; Sio	5:26
16.	"Calling" (featuring YCee)	Kandava; YCee	2:59
17.	"Outro" (featuring Stefflon Don)	Kandava; Stephanie Victoria Allen	1:12

== Personnel ==
Credits adapted from Allmusic website.

=== Personnel ===
- Nadia Kandava – lead vocals, composer
- Stefflon Don – composer, lead vocals (track 17)
- Cassper Nyovest – composer, lead Vocals (track 7,10)
- Khuli Chana – composer, lead vocals (track 8)
- Kwesta – composer, lead vocals (track 15)
- Lady Zamar – vocals (track 9)
- Y. Cee – lead vocals (track 16)
- Sio – lead vocals (track 15)
- Tshego – lead vocals (track 11)
- Oludemilade Martin Alej – composer
- Yamikani Banda – composer
- Bash Jameson – composer
- Benn Gilbert Kamoto – composer
- Tshegofatso Ketshbile – composer
- Almotie Mtombeni – composer
- Tawanda Mujaji – composer
- Senzo Vilakazi – composer
- Ntuthuko Zungu – composer

== Release history ==
Region	Date	Format	Label	Ref.
Various	June 4, 2019	CD; Digital download; streaming	Family Tree Records	
