= Any Minute Now =

Any Minute Now may refer to:

- Any Minute Now (Machel Montano album), 1999
- Any Minute Now (Soulwax album), 2004
- Any Minute Now, a 2020 album by Cassper Nyovest
- Any Minute Now, a 2018 album by D-Block Europe
