= Tshego =

South African-American musician

- Also known as: Pink Panther
- Born: Tshegofatso Ketshabile; 21 May 1990 (age 36); Atlanta, Georgia, United States
- Origin: South Africa
- Citizenship: United States (citizenship by birth); South Africa (1990–present)
- Genres: Pop, R&B, Hip hop
- Occupations: Singer; songwriter
- Instrument: Vocals
- Years active: 2014–present
- Labels: Def Jam Africa (current); Universal Music Africa (current); Family Tree (former)
- Website: officialtshego.com

Tshegofatso Ketshabile, known professionally as Tshego is a South African-American singer-songwriter. He gained prominence in 2016, after releasing his hit single "Hennessy" and release of his debut album Pink Panther (2019).

== Early life ==
Tshego was born to two ordained ministers on 21 May 1990 in Atlanta, Georgia United States where his parents were studying. He frequently visited South Africa from the age of 4 until he eventually relocated and settled in Mafikeng to focus on his music career.

== Career ==
In May 2020, Tshego signed a record deal with Def Jam Africa, a flagship of Def Jam Recordings.

== Personal life ==
Tshego has previously admitted to being a drug addict in 2016. Tshego has a daughter born on 12 July 2019 with Lola Kyle.

== Discography ==
=== Studio albums ===
Album name	Release year	Ref
Pink Panther	2019	

=== Single discography ===
Single Name	Release year	Ref
Hennessy (ft. Gemini Major & Cassper Nyovest)	2016	
The Vibe (ft Cassper Nyovest)	2017	
Money Machine (featuring Nasty C and Nadia Nakai)	2018	
No Ties (ft. King Monada)	2019	

== Awards and nominations ==
Year	Award Ceremony	Award name	Work	Results	Ref
2020	26th South African Music Awards	Best R&B/Soul Album	Pink Panther	Nominated	
2020	26th South African Music Awards	Record of the Year	No Ties	Nominated	
