= Refiloe =

Studio album by Cassper Nyovest
- Released: 31 October 2015
- Recorded: 2015
- Genre: Hip hop; Motswako; House; Kwaito; Reggae
- Length: 79:05
- Label: Family Tree; Kalawa Jazmee Records; Universal Music South Africa
- Producer: Refiloe Maele Phoolo (also exec.); Alie Keyz; Anatii; RtzR(fortune Zikhali); Beatjunky TP; Black Motion; DJ Maphorisa; Ganja Beatz; Gemini Major; PatricKxxLee; Taylor Made Beatz

Cassper Nyovest chronology
| Tsholofelo: Platinum Edition (2015) | Refiloe (2015) | Thuto (2017) |

Singles from Refiloe
- 1. "Mama I Made It (#MIMI)" Released: 14 August 2015; 2. "Le Mpitse" Released: 3 December 2015; 3. "Malome (Extended)" Released: 20 January 2016; 4. "War Ready"

Refiloe is the second studio album by South African hip hop recording artist Cassper Nyovest, released initially on 31 October 2015 at his Fill Up The Dome concert at the Ticket Pro Dome in Johannesburg.

Refiloe, which means "we have been given", is Nyovest's first name and is a unisex name in Setswana.

== Background and recording ==
Guest appearances on this album include fellow South African recording artists Anatii, Riky Rick, Carpo and Doc Shebeleza, as well as international recording artists Stonebwoy and American hip hop recording artists DJ Drama, Casey Veggies and The Game.

== Singles ==
The first single off the album, titled "Mama I Made It" was released on 14 August 2015, followed by the promotional singles "Bheki'ndaba Zakho" released on 25 October 2015 and "No Worries" released on 30 October 2015. The album's second single "Le Mpitse" was serviced to urban contemporary radio stations on 3 December 2015. The music video which was directed by Kyle White and produced by Visual Content Gang, was released on Nyovest's YouTube account on 17 December 2015.

On 20 January 2016 Nyovest released an extended version of "Malome" as the album's third single.

== Commercial performance ==
The album was first released on 31 October 2015 at Nyovest's show at the Ticket Pro Dome in Johannesburg, whereby the purchase of each ticket by each concert goer, resulted in each one of them receiving an accompanying copy of his second studio album. This resulted in sales of over 20,000 copies of the album in a few hours of its first day.

Refiloe debuted a few days later on 6 November 2015 on iTunes. Within 30 minutes of being made available for download, the album peaked at top of the South African iTunes chart across all genres.

As of 9 December 2015, Refiloe was certified Platinum by Recording Industry of South Africa (RISA) for selling 40,000 copies domestically.

== Track listing ==
From Connect.

All lyrics were written and composed by Refiloe Maele Phoolo;co-writers are listed

| No. | Title | Writer(s) | Producer | Length |
|---|---|---|---|---|
| 1. | "Pelo Yaka (Skit)" | Refiloe Maele Phoolo | | 0:12 |
| 2. | "Strive" | Refiloe Maele Phoolo | Ganja Beatz*Cassper Nyovest | 4:29 |
| 3. | "Mmangwane" | Refiloe Maele Phoolo | Gemini Major*Ganja Beatz*Alie Keys | 5:02 |
| 4. | "Refiloe" | Refiloe Maele Phoolo | Ganja Beatz*Alie Keys | 4:21 |
| 5. | "Malome (Interlude)" (featuring Mahotella Queens) | Refiloe Maele Phoolo*Hilda Tloubatla*Nobesuthu Mbadu*Amanda Nkosi | Cassper Nyovest*Alie Keyz*Anatii | 2:43 |
| 6. | "Americans" | Refiloe Maele Phoolo | Beatjunky TP | 3:18 |
| 7. | "War Ready" | Refiloe Maele Phoolo | Ganja Beatz | 5:44 |
| 8. | "AJah in Motion" | Refiloe Maele Phoolo | Black Motion | 5:09 |
| 9. | "Find My Way" (with Black Motion) | Refiloe Maele Phoolo | Black Motion | 4:00 |
| 10. | "Mama I Made It" | Refiloe Maele Phoolo | Ganja Beatz | 3:21 |
| 11. | "Bheki'ndaba Zakho" | Refiloe Maele Phoolo | Ganja Beatz | 4:12 |
| 12. | "Upper" (featuring Carpo) | Refiloe Maele Phoolo | PatricKxxLee, Bass | 3:44 |
| 13. | "428 to L.A" (featuring Casey Veggies) | Refiloe Maele Phoolo*Olaide Daboiku*Anathi Mnyango | Anatii | 4:06 |
| 14. | "Le Mpitse" (featuring Riky Rick) | Refiloe Maele Phoolo*Rikhado Makhado | Taylor Made Beatz | 4:05 |
| 15. | "Tse Tswembu Tse Blind" (featuring DJ Drama) | Refiloe Maele Phoolo*Tyree Simmons | Anatii | 3:00 |
| 16. | "Monate So" (featuring Doc Shebeleza) | Refiloe Maele Phoolo*Victor Bogopane | Bass*DJ Cassanova | 4:13 |
| 17. | "Cooking In Da Kitchen" (featuring The Game) | Refiloe Maele Phoolo*Jayceon Taylor | Ganja Beatz | 4:04 |
| 18. | "Fever" (featuring Stonebwoy) | Refiloe Maele Phoolo | Gemini Major | 3:28 |
| 19. | "A Lot To Live For" (featuring Tshego & Alie Keyz) | Refiloe Maele Phoolo | Alie Keyz | 5:01 |
| 20. | "No Worries" | | Alie Keyz | 4:53 |
| Total length: | | | | 79:05 |

Notes

"War Ready" samples "Izinja Zam" written by Kabelo Mabalane, Tokollo Tshabalala & Zwai Bala and performed by TKZee.

"Find My Way" samples "Rainbow" written and performed by Black Motion featuring Xoli M

"Le Mpitse" samples "Mpitse" written and performed by Hip Hop Panstula

"Monate So" samples "Monate So" written and performed by Doc Shebeleza

== Certifications and sales ==
| Region | Certification | Certified units/sales |
|---|---|---|
| South Africa (RISA) | Platinum | 40,000^{*} |
^{*} Sales figures based on certification alone.

== Release history ==
| Country | Date | Format | Label |
|---|---|---|---|
| South Africa | 31 October 2015 | CD | Family Tree, Kalawa Jazmee Records |
| South Africa | 6 November 2015 | Digital Download | Family Tree, Kalawa Jazmee Records |
