= Tshwanelo =

Studio album by Tuks
- Released: 2010
- Recorded: 2009–2010
- Genre: Hip hop
- Label: June/July Productions
- Producer: Tuks

Tuks chronology
Monopoly (2008)	Tshwanelo (2010)	Footprints (2012)

Singles from Tshwanelo
- 1. "Tshwanelo"; 2. "Let Me Live Now"

Alternate album cover
- Cover from redistributed album in 2012

Tshwanelo is the fourth studio album by South African hip hop artist Tuks. The album was originally released in 2010 and later re-issued in 2012.

== Album art ==
The album art for both the original and redistributed Tshwanelo differ, notably by spelling. In the original release cover it is written "Tswanelo" instead of "Tshwanelo" while the redistributed version has the allegedly correct spelling. Either way the original version was released officially. The album cover is thought to be quite similar to The Roots' highly acclaimed 2002 release Phrenology.

== Awards and nominations ==
Tshwanelo was nominated for Best Rap Album in the 17th Annual South African Music Awards but lost to Amu's The Principal. Tuks also received a nomination for Best Hip-Hop Album in the 2011 Metro FM Awards.

== Track listing ==
1. Lerato La Motswako - 2:03
2. Lefika Fika - 3:15
3. All Right OK - 3:57
4. The Gift - 2:33
5. Asim'Bonanga - 4:38
6. Good Lie - 4:08
7. Brakkie - 3:49
8. Tshwanelo Sunday Session - 3:45
9. Kwana Le Kwana - 3:18
10. Changing World - 4:54
11. Let Me Live Now - 3:30
12. Konokono - 4:04
13. Tshwanelo - 3:50
