= Tsholofelo =

2014 debut studio album by Cassper Nyovest

Studio album by Cassper Nyovest
- Released: 18 July 2014
- Recorded: 2011–2014
- Genre: Hip hop; Motswako; house; kwaito; Afro pop
- Length: 77:46
- Label: Family Tree; Kalawa Jazmee Records; Universal Music South Africa
- Producer: Refiloe Maele Phoolo (also exec.); Ganja Beatz; Blackstorm; Masterkraft; Uhuru; Riky Rick; BeatJunky; DJ Buckz; Anatii; Brian Essence; Aux Cable; Sean Craig Beats; Brian Soko

Cassper Nyovest chronology
Tsholofelo (2014)	Refiloe (2015)

Singles from Tsholofelo
- 1. "Gusheshe" Released: 19 April 2013; 2. "Doc Shebeleza" Released: 17 January 2014; 3. "Phumakim" Released: 3 July 2014

Tsholofelo is the debut studio album by South African hip hop recording artist Cassper Nyovest, released digitally via iTunes on 18 July 2014 and physically released on 31 July 2014 under a distribution deal with AMG Worldmedia owned by Lindsay Jerome Arends, a former & founding member of the R&B group Ashaan.

Tsholofelo, which means "hope", is named after his younger sister. Work on the album began as early as 2011 and continued on through 2014. It features guest appearances from HHP, Okmalumkoolkat, Bucie, iFANi, Riky Rick, Bass Mdlongwa, Ntukza, Kyle Deutschmann, Tshego, Anatii, Skales (credited as Young Skalez), KayGizm from Morafe and Prokid. Prior to its release, the album was supported by three free singles: "Gusheshe", "Doc Shebeleza" and "Phumakim", all of which achieved wide mainstream appeal.

== Background, recording and release ==
The idea to name the album after Nyovest's younger sister came after she gave Cassper her allowance for him to relocate to Johannesburg with: "At the time, I had just quit everything and I didn't have the money to travel and come to Jo'burg to hustle. Ever since that day it has always been about making sure that her sacrifice was not in vain." In September 2013, Nyovest mentioned that the album was 90% percent done: "I've recorded a lot of music, now I just need to conceptualize the story of the album. There's so much music because I'm currently sitting on like 300 songs, so I don't even know what to do." He also mentioned that guest appearances on the album would include Okmalumkoolkat, Masterkraft, Kaygizm, Shag, PRO, Kyle Deutschmann, Skales, Riky Rick, iFani and HHP. In March 2014 a track list of the album was leaked online. Nyovest would later state that the album contained 19 songs and not 16 as shown by the track list. On 10 June 2014, he revealed the cover for the album, along with the release date. On Mandela Day, Nyovest released the album exclusively on iTunes without prior announcement. Within an hour of its debut, Tsholofelo peaked at number 1 on the iTunes South Africa albums chart.

== Promotion ==
In support of the album, many promotional singles were released including "#BMK" and "Wahala" featuring Young Slugz. Both songs were produced by Ganja Beatz and accompanied by music videos. On Valentine's Day, 2013, Nyovest released a track titled "Girlfriend" as part of the "TruSSt Thursdays" series. The song features and is produced by Riky Rick. Nyovest also did a string of radio interviews and performances to promote the album. On 2 July 2014, he performed an unreleased song on Metro FM titled, "Alive" which features Durban based vocalist and Idols SA season 10 top 11 finalist Kyle Deutschmann.

== Album artwork ==
The artwork was revealed via Twitter and Facebook by Nyovest on 10 June 2014. The cover, which was designed by Freshboi, is an illustration of Nyovest's portrait.

== Singles ==
In April 2013, the album's lead single "Gusheshe" was released. It features Dirty Paraffin's Okmalumkoolkat.

The second single, "Doc Shebeleza", produced by Sean Craig Beats, was released on 17 January 2014 for free digital downloads. Its music video was directed by Nicky Campos and Nyovest. It has a total runtime of 4 minutes and 2 seconds. The song debuted at number 4 on South Africa's official music chart.

"Phumakim", the album's third single, was released on 3 July 2014 with production from Zimbabwean producer, Brian Soko, who co-produced Drunk in Love by Beyoncé. "Phumakim" which is in Zulu, loosely translates to "Leave me alone". In the song, Nyovest addresses the criticism that celebrities receive on social media and makes a reference to his highly publicized feud with rapper AKA. He also raps about how he only dates women as famous as him. The beat for Phumakim was originally meant for American rapper, Future, who declined it. "Phumakim" garnered 15,000 downloads within its first minute of release and trended on Twitter in South Africa and in the UK.

"Tsibip", the album's promotional single, was released in August 2014. Two videos were shot for the song to showcase Cassper Nyovest's different alter-egos, "Cassper" and "Nyovest". Both of the videos were shot by Studio Space Pictures. The first video premiered on MTV Base's "Spanking New Premiere". It is a one-take video which shows Nyovest bare chest wearing a wrist watch, a ring and a gold chain around his neck. For the duration of the video, Nyovest tries on and exchanges different caps up until he puts on the cap he is depicted wearing on the Tsholofelo album cover. The second video premiered on Channel O's "Turn Up" on the same day.

== Commercial performance ==
In April 2015, the album was certified Platinum by the Recording Industry of South Africa, selling over 40,000 copies. To celebrate this, Nyovest released a platinum edition of the album which features new material and old songs which never made the final track list of Tsholofelo.

== Critical reception ==
Professional ratings
Review scores
Source	Rating
PLATFORM	82/100
LiveMag	3.5/5 stars

Upon its release, Tsholofelo received generally positive reviews. Tsepang Tlhapane of Live Mag felt the pitfall of the album was its lengthiness and its production. However, he praised the album's intro, calling it "heartfelt" and commended its drum arrangement. He also praised "Tsibip" for its witty punchlines and "Skeptedaba" for embodying elements of 90s Kwaito music.

Andy Petersen of PLATFORM gave the album a score of 82/100 adding: "This is an artist in motion - one unafraid to exhibit his growth. Tsholofelo is certainly not a perfect album, but it is a very good one. And it hints strongly of someone who is only going to get better."

== Track listing ==
=== Standard edition ===
No.	Title	Writer(s)	Producer	Length
1.	"I Hope You Bought It"	Refiloe Maele Phoolo		4:54
2.	"Style Se Legit"	Refiloe Maele Phoolo	BeatJunky	4:04
3.	"Cold Hearted" (featuring Tshego)	Refiloe Maele Phoolo; Khumoetsile Tshegofatso Koobetseng	Brian Essence; Cassper Nyovest^{[a]}	5:30
4.	"Tsholofelo (Skit)"			0:31
5.	"Welcome to My Life" (featuring Ntukza)	Refiloe Maele Phoolo; Bantu Hanabe		4:29
6.	"Alive" (featuring Kyle Deutschmann)	Refiloe Maele Phoolo; Kyle Deutschmann	Aux Cable	5:04
7.	"Phumakim"	Refiloe Maele Phoolo	Brian Soko	3:42
8.	"Skeptedaba"	Refiloe Maele Phoolo		3:50
9.	"Ghetto Olympics" (featuring iFani & Uhuru)	Refiloe Maele Phoolo; Mzondeleli Boltina; Themba Sekowe; Sihle Dlalisa; Xelimpilo Simelane; Nqobile Mahlangu	Uhuru; DJ Buckz^{[a]}	4:29
10.	"Tsibip"	Refiloe Maele Phoolo	Ganja Beatz	3:46
11.	"Doc Shebeleza"	Refiloe Maele Phoolo	Fenesse (Sean Craig Beats)	3:51
12.	"Shake'a Letheka" (featuring HHP & Pro)	Refiloe Maele Phoolo; Jabulani Tsambo; Linda Mkhize	Ganja Beatz	3:37
13.	"Gusheshe" (featuring Okmalumkoolkat)	Refiloe Maele Phoolo; Smiso Zwane	Ganja Beatz; Cassper Nyovest^{[b]}	4:23
14.	"Bad One" (featuring Anatii)	Refiloe Maele Phoolo; Anathi Mnyango	Anatii	3:21
15.	"Girlfriend" (featuring Riky Rick)	Refiloe Maele Phoolo; Rikhado Makhado	Riky Rick	3:24
16.	"She Loves Me" (featuring Bucie)	Refiloe Maele Phoolo; Busisiwe Nolubabalo Nqwiliso	Ganja Beatz	5:28
17.	"Love Is Fucking Blind" (featuring KayGizm)	Refiloe Maele Phoolo; Kgaugelo Choabi	Ganja Beatz	4:44
18.	"Travel the World" (featuring Uhuru & Bass)	Refiloe Maele Phoolo; Bass Q Mdlongwa; Themba Sekowe; Sihle Dlalisa; Xelimpilo Simelane; Nqobile Mahlangu	Uhuru	4:00
19.	"Lerato" (featuring Skales & Masterkraft)	Refiloe Maele Phoolo; Raoul John Njeng-Njeng; Sunday Nweke	Masterkraft	4:29
Total length:				77:46

=== Tsholofelo (platinum edition) track list ===
No.	Title	Writer(s)	Producer	Length
1.	"Above The Water" (featuring Ckenz Voucal)			06:13
2.	"Bmk"			04:19
3.	"Cold Hearted" (featuring Tshego)			05:30
4.	"Ghetto" (featuring DJ Drama and Anatii)	Refiloe Phoolo; Anathi Mnyango	Anatii	03:33
5.	"428 to LA" (featuring Casey Veggies)		Anatii	04:09
6.	"Doc Shebeleza [West Africa Remix]" (featuring Burna Boy and Mi)			04:34
7.	"Single For The Night" (featuring WizKid)		Anatii	03:56
8.	"Travel the World" (featuring Uhuru & Base)			04:00
9.	"Tsholofelo" (Skit)			00:31
10.	"Alive" (featuring Kyle Deutsh)			03:59
11.	"Phumakim"			03:42
12.	"Style Se Legit"			04:04
13.	"Skeptadaba"			03:52
14.	"Bad One" (featuring Anatii)	Refiloe Maele Phoolo; Anathi Mnyango	Anatii	03:21
15.	"Girlfriend" (featuring Riky Rick)	Refiloe Maele Phoolo; Rikhado Makhado	Riky Rick	03:24
16.	"Tsibip"			03:46
17.	"Doc Shebeleza"			03:51
18.	"Gusheshe" (featuring Okmalumkoolkat)			04:23
19.	"I Hope You Bought It"			04:54
Total length:				76:01

Notes
- ^{^[a]} signifies a co-producer

- ^{^[b]} signifies an additional producer

== Personnel ==
Credits for Tsholofelo adapted from AllMusic.

- Anatii – primary artist
- Base – primary artist
- Mzondeleli Boltina – composer
- Bucie – primary artist
- Kgaugelo Goodchild Choabi – composer
- Kyle Deutschmann – composer, primary artist
- Aashish Gangaram – composer
- HHP – primary artist
- iFani – primary artist
- Kaygizm – primary artist
- Khumoetsile Tshegofatso Koobetseng – composer
- Rikhado Makhado – composer
- MasterKraft – composer, primary artist
- Bass Q Mdlongwa – composer
- Linda Mkhize – composer
- Anathi Mnyango – composer
- Busisiwe Nolubabalo – composer
- Ntukza – primary artist
- Cassper Nyovest – primary artist
- Okmalumkoolkat – primary artist
- R.M. Phoolo – composer
- Tsholofelo Phoolo – composer
- Pro – primary artist
- Obakeng Ramahali – composer
- Riky Rick – primary artist
- Jabulani Tsambo – composer
- Tshego – primary artist
- Uhuru – primary artist
- Young Skalez – composer, primary artist
- Smiso Zwane – composer
- Brian Essence - composer

== Certification and sales ==
Region	Certification	Certified units/Sales
South Africa (RiSA)	2× Platinum	80,000+

== Release history ==
Country	Date	Format	Label
South Africa	18 July 2014	digital download	Family Tree, AMG Worldmedia
South Africa	31 July 2014	CD	Family Tree, AMG Worldmedia
