= Mafoko A Me =

Studio album by Tuks
- Released: November 10, 2005
- Recorded: 2005
- Genre: Hip Hop
- Label: Ghetto Ruff
- Producer: Impact Sounds

Singles from Mafoko A Me
- 1. "Senganga"; 2. "525 600 Minutes"; 3. "Let Live"

Mafoko A Me is the debut studio album of South African hip hop artist Tuks, released in 2005 in South Africa.

== Critical reception ==
MIO -

Mafoko A Me garnered positive reviews. With MIO giving an overall score of 8/10, stating that: " Thabiso "Thaso" Tsotetsi and Code Jack, the intro – “Manifesto” knocked the wind out of me with its power, what a pity it was only an intro and not a full track. Vice Versa, with its hard core Setswana lyrics played on my sentiments at just the right time and I liked the beats of the track titled “The Need”, but “Let Live” tune...haai bafoethu, this boy is talented. Gravy Train, hit me left, right and center and again the tone of this track kept me nodding my head up and down in affirmation. Though I am not a Tswana boy, “Mona” got me interested, even influencing me to memorise the lyrics. Other tracks to enjoy are “Father to the Platoon”, “Off the Planet”, “525 600 minutes”, “Bitch Talk” and “Hustle”." furthermore adding, " Thank God my cousin introduced me to this release because as soon as I gave it a second listen, this young man blew my ear drums as well as my mind."

== Accolades ==
This album won Best Rap Album in the 12th annual South African Music Awards. That same year, Tuks was also nominated for Best Newcomer.

== Track listing ==
1. "Manifesto (Intro)" - 1:11
2. "Vice Versa" - 4:09
3. "Kom'tseng" ft Zossa - 3:36
4. "I Love You Back" - 3:03
5. "The Need" - 4:14
6. "Pressure Point" ft Malik - 4:19
7. "Let Live" - 4:00
8. "Ba Lefoko" - 1:00
9. "Mafoko A Me" - 3:55
10. "Just Chilling" ft Ismael - 4:20
11. "Gravy Train" - 3:43
12. "Snenganeng Snenganeng Snenganeng Snenganeng Snenganeng” - 4:03
13. "Bitch Talk" ft HHP - 4:59
14. "Rough No Mo" - 3:28
15. "Hustle" - 4:13
16. "Senganga" - 4:09
17. "Mona" - 4:07
18. "Father To The Platoon" - 1:38
19. "Off The Planet" - 3:35
20. "525 600 Minutes" - 5:13
