= Benny Mayengani =

- Born: Mayengani Benny Baloyi; 11 January 1979 (age 47); Bolobedu, Limpopo Province, South Africa
- Origin: Shawela, Limpopo Province, South Africa
- Genres: Tsonga Music; Disco
- Occupations: Singer and a politician
- Instrument: Vocals
- Years active: 2011–present
- Labels: Gallo Records; Bula Music

Mayengani Benny Baloyi (born 11 January 1979), known by his stage name President Benny Mayengani, is a South African Xitsonga singer and rose to fame following the release of his debut studio album Tiba Ben in 2011.

== Music career ==
Benny Mayengani is known for his collaboration with Mr Jambatani, Prince Rhangani, Hlungwane soldier one Joe Shirimani na Vana va Ndoda under Limpopo Poison. He released his debut studio album Tiba Ben in 2011 which gained him prominent notability in the Xitsonga music industry. On 28 September 2013 during Xitsonga Music Awards, Benny Mayengani scored three nominations in these categories; Best Xitsonga Male Artist, Best Xitsonga Popular Song of the year and Best Xitsonga Album of the year.

His 10th studio album Ni Happy which was released in 2019 was nominated at the Limpopo Music Awards for Best Male Artist. Benny Mayengani released "Malambani" on the 27 November 2020 which topped the iTunes Charts for nine days in a row.

== Politics ==
Benny Mayengani apart from his musical career he became the first Tsonga musician to be an official of the Johannesburg Chamber as PR Councilor of City of Johannesburg accounted by Economic Freedom Fighters in 2016. On 7 October 2019 Benny Mayengani quit as the PR Councilor of EFF. In February 2020 Limpopo Chairperson Stanley Mathabatha of African National Congress, officially welcomed Benny Mayengani to the ANC. In June 2023, he opened his own Political Party AADP (Action Alliance Development Party).

== Lawsuits and civil disputes ==
=== "Fill Up" trademark ===
Benny Mayengani was looking forward to host music concert, #FillUpGiyaniStadium in 2018. He used a similar affix ("Fill Up"/"#FillUp") as South African rapper Cassper Nyovest, which resulted in accusation made by Cassper Nyovest that Benny Mayengani used his trademark by sending Benny Mayengani a cease and desist letter. Investigation revealed that Cassper Nyovest did not own the #FillUp trademark and can not take any action against Benny Mayengani.

== Discography ==
- Tiba Ben – 2011
- President Mayengani – 2012
- Ntombhi yaku xonga – 2013
- Vayuda – 2014
- December Revolution – 2014
- Nkondo wa Tuva – 2015
- Nkelunkelu – 2015
- Vitanani Fire Brigade – 2016
- Tintoma – 2018
- Ni Happy – 2019
- Volume – 2019
- Malambani - 2020
- Tiko Raka Hina - 2021
- Jeso - 2022
- Vamatiko - 2022
- Vana va nhova - 2023
- Mahlasela - 2024

== Awards and nominations ==
=== Xitsonga Music Awards ===
Year	Nominee / work	Award	Result
XMA10 2012	Benny Mayengani	Best Xitsonga Polpular Song of the year	Won
XMA13 2015	Nghoma (w/ Limpopo Roots)	Best Xitsonga House Song	Nominated
XMA13 2015	Benny Mayengani	Best Xitsonga Duo/Group	Nominated
XMA13 2015	Kecekece (w/ Kenny Bevhula, Percy Mfana, Prince Rhangani & Sunglen)	Best Xitsonga Collaboration	Won
XMA13 2015	Benny Mayengani	Best Male Artist	Nominated
XMA13 2015	Nkondo wa tuva	Most Popular Song	Nominated

=== Limpopo Music Awards ===
Year	Nominee / work	Award	Result
LIMA 2019	Benny Mayegani	INDUSTRY CONTRIBUTOR “FILL UP GIYANI STADIUM”	Won
LIMA 2019	Himself	Best Male Artist	Nominated
