= Monopoly (album) =

Studio album by Tuks
- Released: March 13, 2009
- Recorded: 2007–2008
- Genre: Motswako
- Label: June/July Productions

Monopoly is the third studio album by Tuks.

== Critical reception ==
The album received positive reviews. Channel24 rated it 4 out of 5, noting: "Expectedly, a lot of people might find the album exhaustive and preachy, and in some cases they might have a point – Tuks does seem to go on a bit. But at a time when most of local hip hop seems to apologetically fit itself into a commercial mould, Tuks’ impassioned audacity comes as a welcome breath of fresh air."

== Accolades ==
The album earned Tuks three awards: the Metro FM Music Award for Best Hip Hop Album and two Hype Magazine Hip Hop Awards for Best Album and Best Solo Artist.

== Track listing ==
Official Track listing
No.	Title	Writer(s)	Length
1.	"Preface"	Tuks	0:53
2.	"Levili Net So"		3:50
3.	"Interview"		4:33
4.	"W.C Rap"		4.40
5.	"This Song This Morning"		4:12
6.	"Hell Rain (ft. Maxhoba)"		4:42
7.	"Re Dah"		4:09
8.	"Big Up Fan"		4:22
9.	"To Live And Dine in S.A (ft. Malik)"		5:02
10.	"Club Affair"		3:59
11.	"Game Over"		3:43
12.	"Dipone"		4:22
13.	"Dwadla Frostan"		5:07
14.	"Le Mmatlela Kae?(ft. Maxhoba)"		4:23
15.	"Take Take (ft. Hoodlum Priest)"		3:41
16.	"Joko Ya Hao (ft. Lesengoand)"		5:14
17.	"Power for the People"		5:20
18.	"African Dreams"		2:36
