= Father Creeper =

Studio album by Spoek Mathambo
- Released: 13 March 2012
- Genres: Afro pop, Afro fusion, experimental hip hop, art pop, UK garage
- Length: 50:51
- Label: Sub Pop

Spoek Mathambo chronology
Put Some Red on It (2011)	Father Creeper (2012)	Future Sound of Mzansi (2012)

Father Creeper is the second full-length album released on 3 March 2012, by the Johannesburg, South Africa-based artist Spoek Mathambo, and his second release on US label Sub Pop.

== Track listing ==
No.	Title	Length
1.	"Kites"	5:04
2.	"Venison Fingers"	2:40
3.	"Put Some Red on It"	5:38
4.	"Let Them Talk feat. Yolanda"	5:00
5.	"Dog to Bone"	4:50
6.	"Skorokoro (Walking Away) feat. Okmalumkoolkat"	4:49
7.	"Father Creeper feat. Xander Ferreira"	4:56
8.	"We Can Work feat. Redbone"	3:34
9.	"Stuck Together"	4:56
10.	"Grave (Intro)"	3:00
11.	"Grave"	6:24
