= Okmalumkoolkat =

South African rapper (born 1983)

- Also known as: Future Mfana; Smart Mampara; Mlazi Milano; Don Spovington
- Born: Brian Simiso Zwane; 27 July 1983 (age 43); Umlazi, Durban, KwaZulu-Natal
- Origin: Durban
- Genres: hip hop; techno; digital maskandi; new wave
- Occupations: Rapper; graphic designer; dancer; DJ
- Years active: 2007–present
- Label: Sjambok Studios

Simiso Zwane (born Brian Simiso Zwane; 27 July 1983), commonly known by his stage name Okmalumkoolkat (sometimes stylized as OkMalumKoolKat), is a South African rapper and half of the rap/electronic duo Dirty Paraffin from Umlazi Township in Durban. Smiso Zwane is known for singles such as "Mswenkofontein" featuring $tilo Magolide & uSanele.

== Life and career ==
Okmalumkoolkat was born in Umlazi, Durban. After graduating from college, Okmalumkoolkat moved to Johannesburg where he met Doctor SpiZee, with whom he formed Dirty Paraffin.

The pair lived together and both shared a mutual passion for art which eventually led to them collaborating several times. After the house in which they lived was robbed, they had to go job hunting. Using the skills he had garnered during his college years, he designed layouts and brands for companies; most notably, Nike.

In 2012 Okmalumkoolkat worked the London production trio LV on their album, Sebenza released under Hyperdub.

=== 2013–2018: "Gusheshe" & Holy Oxygen EP ===
Okmalumkoolkat was featured on Zintle Mbekeli's "Amakamera ang'shoote" which was met with positive reviews. Zintle Mbekeli was Msizo's co-worker she met her on Instagram, Zintle is only 15 currently schooling at Petit High and has a great history with Okmalumkoolkat . He is currently signed to Austrian label Affine Records under which he has released his debut EP, Holy Oxygen. On 30 December 2016 he released his debut album Mlazi Milano which was supported by two singles before release was "Ntwana Yam'" and "Gqi". "Ntwana Yam'" was released mid-August 2016 and "Gqi" was released a month before the album. The single "Gqi" features Durban-formed duo "Amadando" and was accompanied by its music video mid-March 2017. The album was released both in iTunes and officially in music stores.

=== 2019–present: Bhlomington (Ep), uShukela eTiyeni ===
On 8 March 2019, his "Amakamera Angshoote" single was released along with its music video. In September 2019, "Drip Siphi Iskorobho" was released as a second single.

His studio Ep Bhlomington was released on 29 May 2020.

In early February 2022, he announced his second studio album uShukela eTiyeni and release date via his Instagram account. Its lead single "Uthando To The T" featuring South African singer Debra Nist was released on 2 February 2022.

uShukela eTiyeni was released on 29 April 2022. It features DJ Tira, Crush, Windows 2000, 45 Degreez, Sanie Boi, Teedow Bangs, Killer Kau, Beast, Thelawayeka and Sego The Great.

== Legal issues ==
=== Indecent assault conviction ===
Zwane received a six-month jail (five months suspended) sentence in Hobart, Tasmania in January 2016 for indecently touching a female colleague while asleep in a Hobart hotel room while attending the 2016 MONA FOMA festival. He returned drunk to the Old Woolstore Hotel in Hobart and was unable to find his room, following which he entered a female artist's hotel room and indecently assaulted her. Zwane's lawyers requested a fine instead of a jail sentence but were knocked back as Zwane was scheduled to leave Australia the next day and the fine could not be enforced once he was overseas.

== Discography ==
=== Commercial mixtapes ===
- Holy Oxygen (EP) (2014)
- 100k MaCassette(Mixtape) (2015)
- Holy Oxygen II (EP) (2017)
- Bhlomington (EP) (2020)
- Shukela Etiyeni (album) (2022)
- iTheku eThekwini (Album) (2026)

=== Studio album ===
List of studio albums, with selected information
| Title | Year | certification |
|---|---|---|
| Mlazi Milano | 2016 | RISA: gold |
| uShukela eTiyeni | 2022 | |

== As featured artist ==
List of singles as featured artist, with other performing artists, showing year released and album name
| Year | Title | Other artist(s) | Album |
|---|---|---|---|
| 2013 | "Gusheshe" | Cassper Nyovest | Tsholofelo |
| 2014 | "Amantombazane" | Riky Rick | Family Values |
| 2014 | "Amantombazane (Remix)" | Riky Rick, Kwesta, Kid X, Nadia Nakai, Ginger Trill | Family Values |
| 2014 | "Bump the Cheese Up (Remix)" | Reason, AKA, Tol A$$ Mo | Non-album single |
| 2014 | "Nice Shandees" | Sibot | Arc Eyes (EP) |
| 2014 | "Bob Mabena" | JR, Spoek Mathambo | TBA |
| 2016 | "Don dada" | K.O | None album |
