= Doc Shebeleza =

South African kwaito artist

Victor Bogopane (1973 – 9 January 2025), also known as Doc Shebeleza, was a South African kwaito artist. His compositions such as "Ingagara" ,"S'kumfete," "Ebumnandini," and "Ghets Ghetsa" made him a popular kwaito artist in the 1990s and early 2000s.

== Career ==
Doc Shebeleza was inspired by Brenda Fassie and Mandoza, one of the pioneers of kwaito genre. In 1995 he released his first album Shebeleza featuring the hit "Ghets Ghetsa". This was followed by "S'kumfete" which featured a hit with the same name. After that, he released three more albums: Tiger (1997), Ebumnandini (2000) [3], and Jiva Yoyo (2001).

== Personal life and death ==
Doc Shebeleza was assisting in building houses for poor people since leaving music. He was also instrumental in the arrangements of Mandoza's funeral. In 2024 Doc Shebeleza had been in and out of hospital and asked for prayers from fans. He was admitted to the Intensive Care Unit of a private hospital in Johannesburg. He underwent successful surgery in December, and two weeks later, he reported feeling better but requested continued prayers from his fans. He died on 9 January 2025, at the age of 51.

== Awards ==
- Mzansi Kwaito and House Music Awards 2018 Lifetime Award

== Legacy ==
The song "Doc Shebeleza" by South African musician Cassper Nyovest paid tribute to Victor Bogopane. In 2014 rapper L-Tido sampled "Ghets Ghetsa" for his song "Steve Kekana".
