= Spoek Mathambo =

- Born: Nthato Monde James Mokgata; 14 May 1985 (age 41); Soweto, Gauteng, South Africa
- Genres: Hip hop; Electronica; Electro; House; Techno; Township tech
- Occupations: Rapper; singer; songwriter; producer
- Years active: 2006–present
- Labels: Teka Records; Sub Pop; BBE Records (former)
- Website: official website

Nthato Monde James Mokgata (born 14 May 1985), known by his stage name Spoek Mathambo, is a South African artist, producer, singer-songwriter and rapper. Mathambo rose to fame in the late 2000s with his fusion of a wide array of musical influences. He is known for coining the term ‘Township Tech’, to describe his sound.

== Early life ==
Mathambo hails from the township Rockville in Soweto, a township at the outskirts of Johannesburg. The trombonist Jonas Gwangwa is his uncle. Born in 1985, Mathambo grew up during the state of emergency in the final years of Apartheid. In the mid 1990s his family moved to Sandown an affluent suburb in Sandton, north of Johannesburg, where Mathambo attended St John's College, Johannesburg.

As a teenager Mathambo showed an interest in creative writing and music, both of which he kept practicing while first studying medicine at the University of Cape Town and later studying graphic design. In Cape Town he became immersed in the local rap and electronic music scene where he gave his first gigs. Here, he also began to collaborate with Waddy Jones (later Die Antwoord), producer Simon Ringrose (known as SiBot) and Markus Wormstorm.

The name Spoek Mathambo is derived from the South African sit-com Emzini Wezinsizwa which Mokgata liked to watch as a child. 'Spoek' translates as ghost in Afrikaans, 'Mathambo' as bones or skeleton in isiZulu. Together, the name translates as something like 'Ghost of Bones' or 'Ghost Skeleton'.

== Career ==
=== 2006-2010: early projects Sweat.X and Playdoe ===
In 2006, Mathambo and Wormstorm started their electro rap-duo project Sweat.X and quickly rose to national prominence by releasing various mixes on their MySpace site. A year later, they signed to UK label Citinite, released their debut EP Ebonyivorytron and toured Europe.

Another of Mathambo's projects in the late 2000s was the duo Playdoe with SiBot (Simon Ringrose). Their debut mini-album It's That Beat was released in 2008 at label Try Harder and followed by a tour through Europe. The same year, they released the album Sibot & Spoek are Playdoe followed in 2010 by the EP African Arcade, both with label Jarring Effects. Another album with the title Bubble & Freeze was released on Leonizer Records in 2010. Together with Starkey they released the EP Freeze Step in 2009.

=== 2010-2011: Mshini Wam ===
A series of mixtapes titled H.I.V.I.P., periodically released on his blog in 2009, helped build Mathambo's reputation for creatively arranging different styles and genres. Mathambo's collaboration with Richard Rumney aka. Richard The Third called Moleke Mbembe eventually developed into a live band supporting Mathambo on his first album.

In 2010, Mathambo's debut solo album Mshini Wam was released on Stockholm label BBE Records. The title is derived from "Umshini Wami", which translates as ‘Bring me my machine gun’, an anti-apartheid struggle song popular with Umkhonto we Sizwe, the armed wing of the African National Congress, in the 1960s. It was also Jacob Zuma's signature song in his bid for power in the late 2000s. Regarding the album's title, Mathambo stated: "My Machine in this case … is my platform to express a new wave of electronic African music blowing through the continent!" The album includes the widely acclaimed song ''Control'', a cover of Joy Division’s "She's Lost Control". The track's video was directed by South African photographer Pieter Hugo and Michael Cleary, who received the Young Director Award at the 2011 Cannes Lions International Festival of Creativity. The video also won the Gold Award at the South African Lories in 2011. Meanwhile, Mathambo was nominated in the Best African Act category for the 2011 MOBO Awards.

In September 2011, he gave a presentation ad TEDxSoweto.

=== 2012: Father Creeper & Future Sound of Mzansi ===
In 2012 Mathambo moved to Seattle label Sub Pop and release his second album Father Creeper. It received four star reviews by The Guardian, Mojo and Q. Father Creeper gained him a second nomination for Best African Act at the 2012 MOBO Awards. Unlike its computerised predecessor, Father Creeper also contains live arrangements. For this, Mathambo collaborated with many artists and reviews described Mathambos music as ''a juxtaposing meltdown of styles that transcend even his own self-prescribed label of 'Township Tech'.'' Later that year, Mathambo went on a UK tour with Damon Albarn and Nick Zinner.

The same year, Mathambo also released his first compilation album Future Sound of Mzansi, consisting of tracks he produced during the last four years.

=== 2013-2014: Escape from '85 & Future Sound of Mzansi (film) ===
Mathambo published his fourth full-length release Escape from '85 in July 2013. The mixtape is a musical hommage to Mathambo's year of birth. A themed video game accompanied the release. Mathambo also contributed two tracks to the 2013 Red Hot + Fela compilation and released a collaborative mini-album with US rapper Shamon Cassette calles Wave Crusher. As in the past two years, Mathambo was again nominated for Best African Act at the 2013 MOBO awards.

Mathambo's debut feature-length documentary film, directed together with filmmaker Lebogang Rasethaba, was released in mid-2014. Twenty years after the end of Apartheid, the three-part series Future Sound of Mzansi presents samples of South Africa's vibrant landscape of electronical music. 'Mzansi' being the isiXhosa and isiZulu term for 'South', thus being the country's colloquial name in youth slang. For the film's production, the Mathambo and Rasethaba travelled the country for two years to explored local genres and styles of electronic music. "The film is about the futuristic sounds throughout Mzansi right now," Mathambo explained in an interview. "We tend to get stuck on the radio stuff but in the country's crevices, nooks and crannies there are some really exciting progressive movements happening, from the poorest people to the upper classes." The documentary features genres like Shangaan electro and gqom, as well as, musicians like DJ Mujava, Black Coffee, Okmalumkoolkat and many more. It premiered at the Durban International Film Festival.

=== 2014-2015: CasaCosmica & Fantasma ===
Early 2014 saw Mathambo releasing material from another side project called CasaCosmica. For their album Dark Arts, befriended artists from six cities around the world had recorded material and shared the files via Dropbox. Mathambo also put out another mixtape of South African rap called Cava The Combo (South African Rap Mix).

After two solo albums and two compilations, Mathambo formed a new five-piece group called Fantasma. The band includes Marvin Ramalepe aka. DJ Spoko from Pretoria, Maskandi multi-instrumentalist Bhekisenzo Cele from Durban, psychedelic rock guitarist André Geldenhuys from Cape Town and drummer Michael Buchanan. The five combine wide-ranging influences from traditional Zulu maskandi music, shangaan electro, hiphop, punk, house and more. They released their debut EP Eye of the Sun on Soundway Records with Moonchild contributing vocals on two tracks. A year after their founding, Fantasma released their debut album Free Love in March 2015.

=== 2017: Mzansi Beat Code ===
In 2017, Mathambo released his fifth solo-album, this time with Teka Records. Unlike in his earlier albums, Mzansi Beat Code contains little vocals by Mathambo himself but has other artists sing over his beats. Isa Jawards from the Guardian described the sound of Mzansi Beat Code as "less raw and adventurous" and more "club-friendly house beats". Piotr Orlov from NPR called the album the product of Mathambo's "lifelong pursuit of a pan-Mzansi aesthetic while also widening the garden of SA's delights to incorporate global vibes."

=== 2015-present: Batuk ===
Teaming up with DJ Aero Manyelo and vocalists Carla Fonseca (aka. Manteiga), as well as, Nandi Ndlovu in 2015, Mathambo formed a new collective called Batuk. According to Carla Fonseca, the band's name Batuk means 'drum' in Portuguese. To records its debut EP Daniel, released in early 2016, Batuk set up in Mozambique. The EP was followed by a debut album Musica da Terra, also released in 2016, which was recorded in South Africa, Mozambique and Uganda, comprising collaborations with artists from all three countries. The collective aims to use house music to explore different African sounds and unify them in a pan-African fashion. In an interview, Mathambo explained: “The point of us mixing up these different cultures and languages is to show unity and to expose people, to make people not say ‘those are the other people’ but to say that ‘those are my people’."

Batuk continued as a duo consisting of Mathambo and Fonseca, who, in 2018, released their second EP Move!, followed by a worldwide tour. Later that same year, the duo released its second album Kasi Royalty. After the pan-African approach of their first album, Kasi Royalty focuses on South African township sounds - Kasi is a South African slang term for township.

== Personal life ==
Mathambo lives in Johannesburg, where he maintains a close friendship with Montle Moorosi II.

== Discography ==
- Ebonyivorytron (2007, EP with Sweat.X)
- It’s That Beat (2008, with Playdoe)
- Sibot & Spoek are Playdoe (2008, with Playdoe)
- African Arcade (2010, EP with Playdoe)
- Mshini Wam (2010)
- Father Creeper (2012)
- Future Sound of Mzansi (2012)
- Escape from '85 (2013)
- Wave Crusher (2013, with Shamon Cassette)
- Eye of the Sun (2014, EP with Fantasma)
- Free Love (2015, LP with Fantasma)
- Daniel (2016, EP with Batuk)
- Musica da Terra (2016, LP with Batuk)
- Mzansi Beat Code (2017)
- Move! (2018, EP with Batuk)
- Kasi Royalty (2018, with Batuk)
- Instrumental Tales From the Lost Cities of Azania (2020)
- Tales From the Lost Cities (2020)
- Again She Reigns (2020, with Batuk)

== Filmography ==
- Future Sound of Mzansi (2014)
- Burkinabe (2019)
