= Thuto =

Studio album by Cassper Nyovest
- Released: 5 May 2017
- Recorded: 2015–2017
- Genre: Hip hop; trap; R&B; kwaito
- Label: Family Tree
- Producer: Cassper Nyovest (exec.); Alie Keyz; Anatii; DJ Abza; Fenesse; Gemini Major; Gobbla; Lae; Zero

Cassper Nyovest chronology
Refiloe (2015)	Thuto (2017)	Sweet and Short (2018)

Singles from Thuto
- 1. "Tito Mboweni" Released: 4 March 2017

Thuto is the third studio album by South African recording artist and record producer Cassper Nyovest. A follow-up to his 2015 album Refiloe, Thuto was released on 5 May 2017 by his imprint Family Tree Records with support from Bridge Entertainment.

== Background and promotion ==
Cassper Nyovest described the project "his best work yet", and claimed the album reached gold status on the first day of its release. Upon the revealing of the tracklist, he revealed on the photo and video-sharing website Instagram that he named the album "Thuto" in dedication to his elder sister Thuto Phoolo, whose birthday coincided with the album's release date. The album was supported by the single "Tito Mboweni", and features vocal guest appearances from Tsepo Tshola, Black Thought, Nadia Nakai, Tshego, Goapele and Riky Rick. Its production was handled by Alie Keyz, Anatii, Gobbla, DJ Abza, Fenesse, Lae and Zero. On 7 May 2017, he hosted the official CD launch at the Zone 6 Venue with notable artists present including Kwesta, Naak Musiq, Kid X, DJ Switch, K.O, DJ Vigilante and DJ Dimplez.

== Critical reception ==
Professional ratings
Review scores
Source	Rating
El Broide	4/5 stars
The Star	3.5/5 stars
Pulse Nigeria	4/5 stars

Thuto was released to widespread acclaim from various music websites and online outlets. Respected Nigerian music critic Joey Akan of Pulse Nigeria described the album as "a celebration of that power, and the offering of new music" and argues that the "album shows all the sides of Cassper Nyovest as South Africa’s leading Hip hop voice". In the same vein, The Star's Davies Ndolo gave the album 3.5/5, writing "Cassper continues to grow into one of the deepest figures in modern hip hop and "Thuto" is the evidence of this. We can only hope his music will continue to make a significant mark in the industry". Independent Online was impressed with the growth Cassper Nyovest has made lyrically since his last album and further observed that "The moment his voice cuts into the soulful melody of Confused, the opening track on Thuto, it’s evident that this is something we’ve haven't heard from him before.". However, Phumlani Langa of South Africa Channel 24 was not impressed with the production and lyrical content of the project, writing: "The illest thing about this album is the stolen adlib “sha-sha!” That’s it, a whole record and the only quotable I recall is ... “sha-sha!".

== Track listing ==
Credits adapted from the album's liner notes.

No.	Title	Writer(s)	Producer(s)	Length
1.	"Confused" (featuring Goapele)	Refiloe Phoolo; Goapele Mohlabane	Alie Keyz	5:14
2.	"I Wasn't Ready For You" (featuring Tshego)	Phoolo; Tshegofatso Ketshabile	Keyz	4:24
3.	"As Karma Would Have It (Interlude)(Performed by Riky Rick)"	Phoolo; Rikhado Makhado	Keyz	1:04
4.	"Destiny" (featuring Goapele)	Phoolo; Mohlabane	Anatii; Keyz; Surprise Ndimande; Cassper Nyovest (add.)	6:41
5.	"Superman" (featuring Tsepo Tshola)	Phoolo; Tsepo Tshola	Keyz; Nyovest	5:41
6.	"Bentley Coupe"	Phoolo	Keyz; Nyovest	5:19
7.	"Nyuku"	Phoolo	Gobbla	4:33
8.	"We Living Good" (featuring Tshego)	Phoolo; Ketshabile	Keyz; Nyovest	5:30
9.	"Top Floor (LifeWasNeverTheSame)"	Phoolo; DIDI Monsta	Keyz; Nyovest	2:18
10.	"Top Shayela" (featuring Nadia Nakai)	Phoolo; Nadia Kandava	Gobbla	4:43
11.	"Tito Mboweni"	Phoolo	Gemini Major	4:01
12.	"Touch The Sky"	Phoolo; Mia Tuttavilla; Dennis Ferrer	Keyz	4:08
13.	"Ng'yekeleni" (featuring Black Thought)	Phoolo; Tariq Trotter	Lae; Fenesse; Zero	3:33
14.	"Push Through The Pain"	Phoolo	Keyz	4:50
15.	"Baby Girl"	Phoolo; Bunny Sigler; Kenny Gamble; Cornell Haynes; Antoine Macon	DJ Abza	4:20
16.	"Amen Hallelujah"	Phoolo	Gobbla	4:05

Notes

- "Destiny" contains samples, interpolations and resung lyrics from "Destiny" by Malaika
- "Touch the Sky" contains a sample from "Touch The Sky" by Dennis Ferrer
- "Baby Girl" contains a sample from "Dilemma" by Nelly & Kelly Rowland

== Certifications and sales ==
Region	Certification	Certified units/sales
South Africa (RISA)	Gold	15,000^{*}
^{*} Sales figures based on certification alone.

== Release history ==
List of release dates, showing region, formats, label, editions and reference
Region	Date	Format(s)	Label	Edition(s)
Worldwide	5 May 2017	CD; digital download	Family Tree	Standard edition
