= Tuks Senganga =

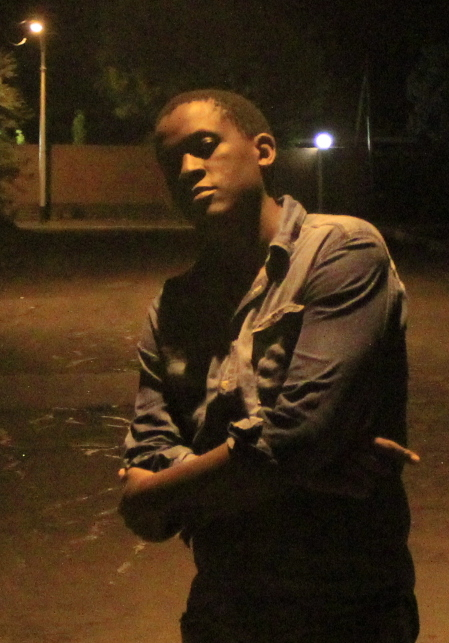

Background information
- Born: Tumelo Meshack Kepadisa
- Origin: North West, South Africa
- Genre: Hip hop,
- Occupation: Multidisciplinary Creative
- Instrument: Producer
- Years active: 2005–present
- Labels: Impact Sounds, Motswvko Culture
- Website: www.tuksmusic.co.za

Tumelo Kepadisa (born 2 May 1981), better known as Tuks Senganga, is a South African motswako rapper born in Mafikeng. He frequently performs in indigenous African languages, mostly Setswana. Tuks Senganga started writing in 1993, drawing inspiration from everyday issues in his immediate environment. His career took off in 2005 with his first album Mafoko A Me. This was the album that earned him the Best Hip Hop Album Award at the 12th Annual MTN South African Music Awards (SAMA).

== Career ==
Born Tumelo Kepadisa in 1981 in Mafikeng, Tuks Senganga started writing poetry at the age of 12 having drawn his inspiration from his daily experiences of having grown up in a homeland during the apartheid regime.

=== Mafoko A Me ===
In 2005, with the rise of the motswako movement, Tuks first album, Mafoko A Me , was released. It had already received major reviews and a number of singles had been on high rotation on national radio stations before its release. Mafoko A Me won Tuks his first SAMA for Best Hip Hop Album.

=== MC Prayer ===
In 2006, he released MC Prayer which was certified gold four months after its release. The production style and quality was leaps ahead of Mafoko A Me and the leading single, "Monate Thwa", led to increased sales for the album, another SAMA nomination for the Best Hip Hop album and a Metro FM Award.

=== Monopoly ===
He took a two-year break from the industry to work on his business interests and came back in 2008 with a thought-provoking third album, Monopoly, which was influenced by several conspiracy theory documentaries. In his story-telling form, he says, "There is something wrong with the world and the way that people are controlled by the media, by music, belief systems and by religion." He adds, "This album is ear-friendly, with a pinch of the truth. It's not about the industry. I'm taking it a step further. I'm talking about the faces behind the industry." With the two-year break that he took, he started working on his own record label, June/July Productions. The company was founded in 2004 and Tuks now runs his own artist and events management, communications, publishing and music production house. Monopoly was released by his June/July Productions with EMI records. The album won him three awards: Metro FM Music Award (Best Hip Hop Album); Hype magazine Hip Hop Awards for Best Album and Best Solo Artist.

=== Tshwanelo ===
In 2010, he independently released Tshwanelo which was a big change from his previous work. Its leading single, the title track, topped charts across the country before the album was released. An even more successful single, "Let Me Live", even attracted Gospel fans. Tshwanelo was nominated for the 17th edition (2011) of the South African Music Awards and the Metro FM awards 2011 edition.

=== Footprints ===
In September 2012, Tuks released his fifth studio album: Footprints. The leading single, "Bona Fela", is the soundtrack to a hit South African TV drama series Skeem Saam which started on TV in October 2011. He also designed the album cover sleeve. He partnered with South Africa's biggest independent label, Next Music, for music, media and digital distribution. Next Music re-released Tshwanelo across major global digital platforms, as well as physical copies in March 2012. Following a successful UK tour in December 2011, Tuks’ collaborated with the Australian producer M-Phazes and the New York-based songwriter, Lydia Caesar, on the album's second single titled "Love Angel".

=== Botshe Botshe ===
Tuks released Botshe Botshe four years after Footprints in 2016. The album consists of 19 tracks including singles like "Gafa" and "Molopita" featuring various artists from South Africa like Mo Molemi and KayGizm(Morafe) also "Scar" from Botswana, Production by Seiso Tswak Baker, Rwess Louis, Blackout Beats and Fatal aXetatic

== Discography ==
Studio albums

- Mafoko A Me (2005)
- MC Prayer (2006)
- Monopoly (2008)
- Tshwanelo (2010)
- Footprints (2012)
- Botshe Botshe (2016)

== Videography ==
Mafoko A me

- "Sneng Neng"
- "525 600 Minutes"
- "Let Live"

"MC Prayer"

- "Monate Thwaa"
- "Ticket to Jozi"

Monopoly

- "Le Mmatlela Kae"
- "Hell Rain"

Tshwanelo

- "Tshwanelo"
- "Let Me Live"
- "Kwana Le Kwana"

Footprints

- "Girlchild"

Botshe Botshe

- Sky is no Limit
- "Gafa"

== Awards and nominations ==
- Nominee South African Music Awards – Best Newcomer (2006)
- Winner South African Music Awards – Best Rap Album (Mafoko A Me) (2006)
- Winner Metro FM Music Awards – Best Hip-Hop Album (MC Prayer) (2007)
- Winner Hype Magazine Awards – Best Album (Monopoly)' (2009)
- Winner Hype Magazine Awards – Best Solo Artist (2009)
- Nominee South African Music Awards - Best Rap Album (Tshwanelo) (2011)
- Nominee Metro FM Music Awards – Best Hip-Hop Album (Tshwanelo)] (2011)
