= Hip Hop Pantsula =

South African rapper (1980–2018)

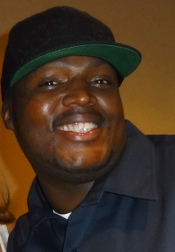
- Hip Hop Pantsula in 2012

Background information
- Born: Jabulani Tsambo; 14 September 1980; Mafikeng, North West
- Origin: North West, South Africa
- Died: 24 October 2018 (aged 38) Johannesburg, South Africa
- Genres: Motswako
- Occupation: Rapper
- Instruments: Vocals
- Years active: 1997–2018
- Label: Lekoko Entertainment

Jabulani Tsambo (14 September 1980 – 24 October 2018), better known by his stage name Hip Hop Pantsula, later shortened to HHP, was a South African Motswako rapper (Motswakolista) who performed in several languages, mostly in Setswana. He was prominent in bringing South African hip hop and motswako rap to the mainstream world. After his death, the African National Congress called him a "music icon who became a beacon of hope and inspired many artists, and individuals in our country".

== Career ==
Tsambo completed his high schooling at St. Alban's College in Pretoria. He was initially part of a group called Verbal Assassins, working with producer Tebogo Rameetse. After the release of their 1997 debut album, Party, the group split up. Pantsula had his next album, Introduction, produced by singer and producer Isaac Mthethwa, and recorded in different South African languages such as Setswana, isiZulu and Sesotho.

Pantsula used the term "Maf-town" as a reference to his hometown of Mafikeng. In 2004 he released O Mang, an album that saw him reuniting with Rameetse as the producer of a track entitled "On My Own". He was honoured in September 2007 in the inaugural Mafikeng Golden Stars Awards.

Pantsula released Acceptance Speech in December 2007 with its first single, "Music & Lights". In December 2009, Pantsula released his seventh studio album Dumela. That same year, he collaborated with South African rapper Proverb on a song entitled "Breadwinners", again featuring Tebogo Rameetse on production. He co-chaired a record label, Lekoko Entertainment.

On 14 September 2021, rapper Focalistic celebrated the legend's 40th birthday with a song which titled Nkaofa 2.0 and featured himself.

== Television appearances ==
In 2007, Tsambo was the winner of Strictly Come Dancing (South African TV series). He presented The Respect Show. He appeared on Who Do You Think You Are? (South African TV series).

== Death ==
Tsambo was discovered dead in his Johannesburg home on 24 October 2018. The tabloid Celeb Gossip South Africa reported that he had committed suicide in what was his fourth attempt following three in 2015. Tsambo revealed in a 2016 interview that he had been battling depression due to his faltering career.

== Personal life ==
Tsambo was married to Lerato Sengadi. He had strong views about African unity.

In 2013 HHP walked from South Africa to Kenya in a walk called "Daraja Walk".

== Discography ==
Studio albums

- Party (1997)
- Introduction (2000)
- Maf Town (2001)
- O Mang? (2003)
- O Mang Reloaded (2004)
- YBA 2 NW (2005)
- Acceptance Speech (2007)
- Dumela (2009)
- Motswafrika (2011)
- Motswako High School (2014)
- Drum (2018)

List of non-single guest appearances, with other performing artists, showing year released and album name
Title	Year	Other artist(s)	Album
"Shake'a Letheka"	2014	Cassper Nyovest; Pro	Tsholofelo

== Awards and nominations ==
Year	Award	Category	Results	Ref.
2009	MTV AMA	Best Video	Won	
2015	MMA	best hip hop award	Won	
2017	SATMA	Lifetime achievement Award	Won	
