= MFR Souls =

South African music duo

- Origin: East Rand, Katlehong
- Genres: Amapiano
- Years active: 2013–present
- Members: Tumelo Nedondwe; Tumelo Mabe

MFR Souls is a South African amapiano music duo founded in 2012 by Tumelo Nedondwe and Tumelo Mabe, both of whom are DJ and music producers from Katlehong in the East Rand of Johannesburg. They are regarded as being part of the pioneers of the ama piano sound, alongside Kabza de small, Jazzidiciples. Their hit single "Love You Tonight" was commercial success certified platinum in South Africa.

== History ==
=== 2009-2013: Early years ===
They met in 2009 at an event in Tokoza and eventually formed their group in 2013, Ma-Ero & Force Reloaded and later was named MFR Souls.

=== 2014-2019: The beginning, Bless The Souls, Scorpion Kings ===
In December 2015, their 5 tracks Extended Play Bless The Souls was released.

In 2016 they released ama piano mixtapes.

On October 4, 2019, they released a single "Love You Tonight" featuring Sha Sha, Kabza De Small and DJ Maphorisa. The song was certified platinum in South Africa. At the 26th ceremony of South African Music Awards "Love You Tonight" was nominated for Best Collaboration and Best Music Video. Their collaborative album Scorpion Kings with Kabza De Small, Virgo Deep and DJ Maphorisa won Best Produced Album of the Year at SAMA 26 awards. On November 8, 2019, their Extended Play The beginning was released.

=== 2020-present: Musical Kings, Healers Of The Soul, T-Squared ===
In early 2020, their single "Amanikiniki" featuring Kamo Mphela and Bontle Smith was released. The song debuted number 3 on RAM charts and was certified platinum with sales of 50 000 units. "Amanikiniki" was nominated for Record of the Year (fan-voted) and Music Video of The Year at 27th South African Music Awards and Song Of the Year at MAMA awards. On August 14, 2020, their second studio album Musical Kings was released. The album features Bontle Smith, Tshego, Zano, J’Something and Manu Worldstar.

On May 14, 2021, they released a single "Abahambayo" featuring Mzulu Kakhulu, Khobzn Kiavalla and DJ T-Man SA.

In October 12, they teased their second studio album Healers Of The Soul, released on November 12, 2021. In November 4, album pre-order were made available.

On April 1, 2022, their EP T-squared was released in South Africa.

In early May 2022, they were featured on Freedom Sounds: From Kwaito to Amapiano documentary by Spotify.

On May 5, 2023, the duo released their long-awaited single, "Bawo" featuring Russell Zuma, Shane907 & Locco MusiQ

== Discography ==
=== Extended plays ===
- The amapiano mixtape (2016)
- The beginning (2019)
- T-squared (2022)
- Elements of Life (2022)

=== Studio albums ===
- Musical Kings (2020)

=== Collaborative albums ===
- The Game Changers (with MDU a.k.a. TRP) (2023)

== Awards and nominations ==
=== Dance Music Awards South Africa ===
Year	Nominee / work	Award	Result	Ref.
2019	"Eargasms"	Best Amapiano Record	Nominated	
