= Motswako =

South African subgenre of hip hop

- Stylistic origins: Hip hop; reggae; drum and bass; electronic music
- Cultural origins: Mid 1990s, Mafikeng, South Africa
- Typical instruments: Rapping; turntablism; spoken word poetry

Other topics
- African hip hop; kwaito

Motswako is a subgenre of hip hop originating from South Africa additionally prominently popularized in Botswana. Mafikeng, the genre's origin point, is located close to the border of Botswana, where Setswana (Tswana) is predominantly spoken similar to Mafikeng. Motswako blends rap lyrics in local languages like Setswana with English over a steady beat. It also incorporates languages such as Sesotho, Zulu and Afrikaans depending on the artist's background. Popularized by South African acts like HHP and Baphixile (comprising "Prof" and "Blax Myth") in the late nineties, it gained a significant following among local audiences. Many emerging artists in South Africa use motswako as a foundation for their music careers due to its accessible principles, emphasizing creative writing skills crucial for mastering the genre. South Africa and Botswana have a substantial pool of motswako artists, although female representation remains limited.

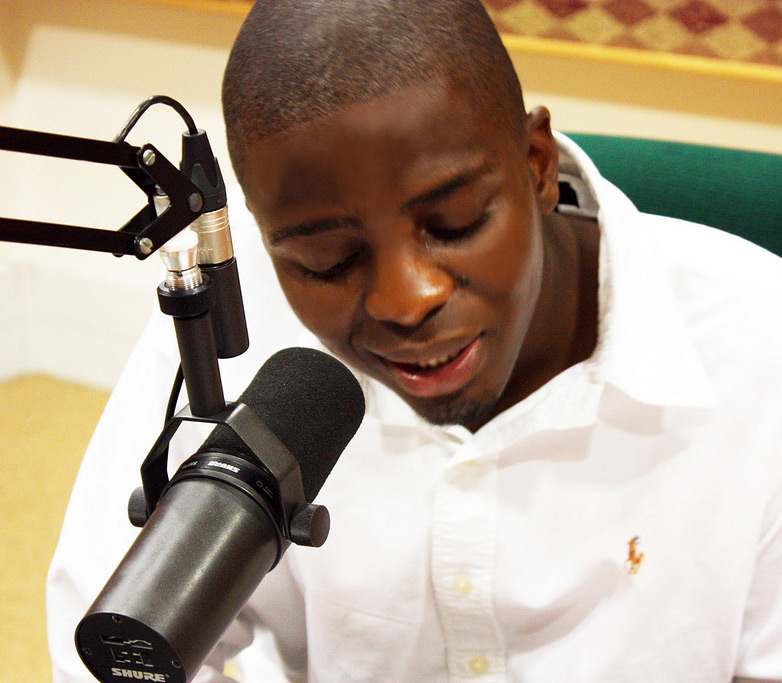
In a recording session motswako rapper Zeus, pictured in 2010.

== Title and traits ==
The genre's name originates from Setswana translating to "blend", "fusion" or simply, "mix" and in context this word refers to the amalgamation of English alongside Setswana or other indigenous languages in the production of motswako.

The musical characteristics of motswako typically encompass smooth yet laid-back rap delivery, a consistent beat, occasionally employing a four-on-the-floor rhythm and incorporating reggae-influenced Afro-centric or drum and bass beats. Minimalistic electronic elements serve to maintain a backdrop for the rap vocals to take center stage. In its early stages, motswako utilized rap lyrics primarily in Setswana alongside American vernacular. Additionally, other South African languages such as Zulu, Xhosa and Afrikaans were incorporated. Lyrical themes range from spoken word poetry performed without accompaniment to localized socio-political or economic commentary, drug culture, unity, pride in local culture, romance, objectification of women, pursuit of wealth, aspirations and celebration.

== History ==
=== Early years - 1990s ===
Setswana-based hip hop traces its origins back to the early 1990s. Stoan Seate was at the forefront of developing the musical style. Beginning with Thandiswa Mazwai, Jah Seed and Speedy in Bongo Maffin, Stoan introduced an African hip hop perspective to the ensemble's sound. Stoan additionally incorporated a combination of traditional Tswana dance with contemporary dance moves, mirroring his blend of Tswana with poetry and rap.

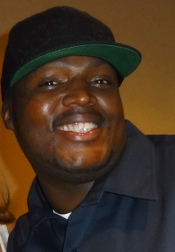
Multi-platinum rapper HHP

Hip Hop Pantsula (HHP), preferring the moniker Jabba, began his journey during his teenage years as a member of the Verbal Assassins, he fashioned himself after Notorious B.I.G., resonating with both Notorious B.I.G.'s stature and allure. Following HHP's introduction to Chicco in the late 1990s, Verbal Assassins released the album Party, which had a lukewarm reception but paved the way for the rise of HHP. Chicco told Kwanele Sosibo of Mail & Guardian following HHP's passing in 2018, "My advice was that the best thing to do is to rap in Setswana because there were very few artists back then doing it, he took my advice and then things started happening for him."

Cashless Society, a commercially successful motswako group, emerged in 1996 with members from Johannesburg and Gaborone. The ensemble was distinctive for rapping in American vernacular rather than Setswana.

=== 2000s - present day ===
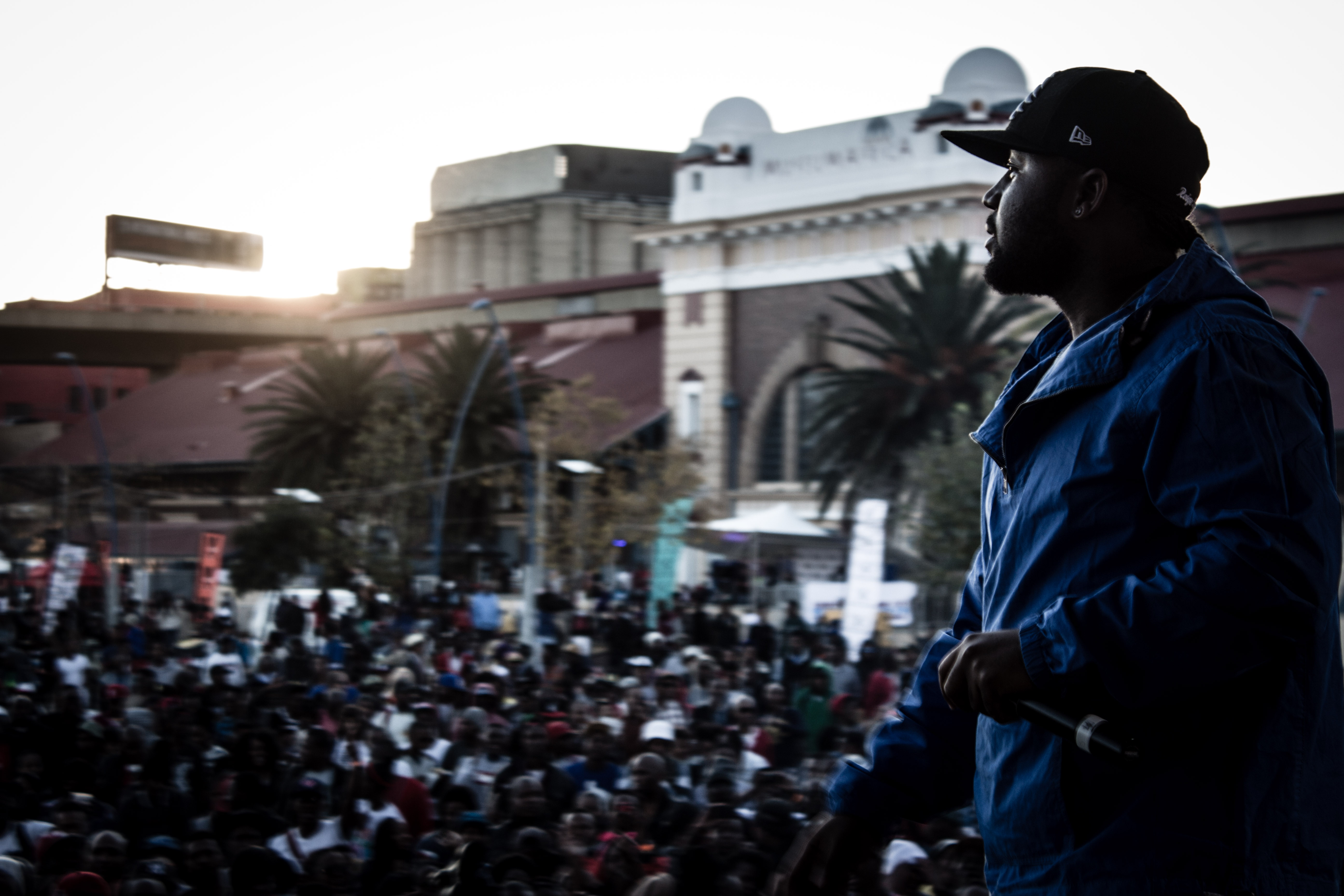
Cassper Nyovest pictured performing in 2014

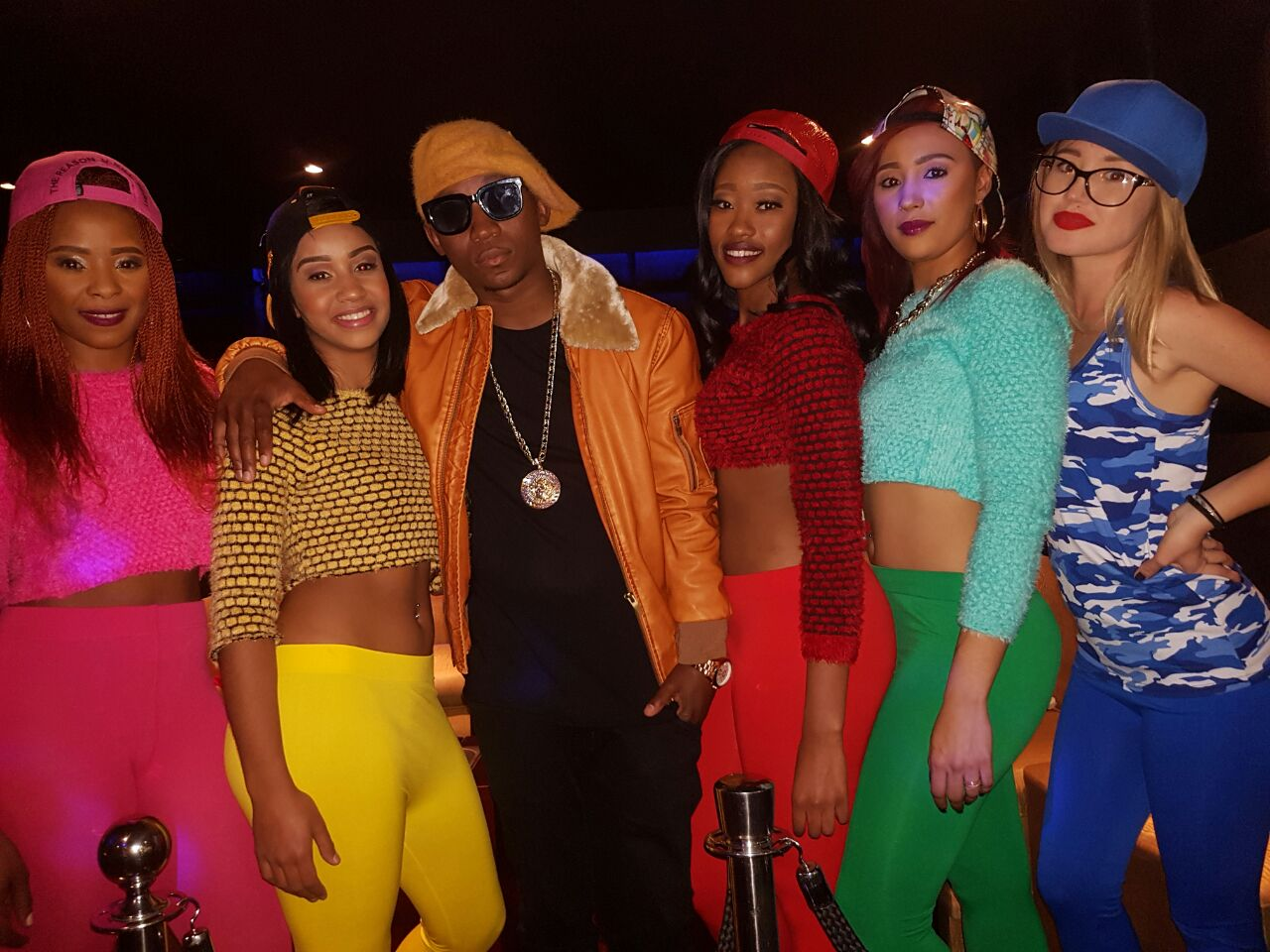
Khuli Chana on a music video, set alongside actress Chioma Umeala

Since the 2000s, South Africa has witnessed the rise of several notable acts, including Mo'Molemi, Tuks Senganga, Notshi, Cassper Nyovest, Spoek Mathambo and Khuli Chana. More recent additions to the motswako rap scene include Zeus, DJ Rade, Dramaboi, Apollo Diablo and Stagga, who hails from London and has Tswana and Jamaican heritage. Moreover in the 2000s, there was a surge in female motswako artists such as Punah, who blends motswako with jazz and gospel elements. Fifi Cooper, initially an R&B singer, transitioned into one of the most prominent female motswako rappers of her era. In 2019, TV presenter turned rapper Boity Thulo commonly recognized as Boity, released single, "Bakae". Boity described the song as "motswako trap".

== See also ==
- iFani
- Maglera Doe Boy
