= Gusheshe =

Single by Cassper Nyovest featuring Okmalumkoolkat

from the album Tsholofelo
- Released: April 19, 2013
- Recorded: 2012
- Genre: Hip hop
- Length: 4:24
- Songwriter(s): Refiloe Maele Phoolo • Smiso Zwane
- Producer(s): Ganja Beatz • Cassper Nyovest

Cassper Nyovest singles chronology
"Gusheshe" (2013)	"Doc Shebeleza" (2014)

Music video
- "Gusheshe" on YouTube

"Gusheshe" is a song by South African hip hop recording artist Cassper Nyovest, released as the first single from his debut studio album Tsholofelo. It was released on 19 April 2013 and features a guest verse from Okmalumkoolkat. The song was written by Nyovest and Okmalumkoolkat. It was produced by Ganja Beatz with co-production from Nyovest.

The artwork, released on April 17, 2013, features a pink 1983 BMW 325i coupé, known commonly as a "gusheshe" in South Africa. Upon its debut, the song received high rotation on radio stations including YFM and 5FM.

Due to its positive reception, Nyovest won 4 awards for the song at the 2nd Annual South African Hip Hop Awards. It was also licensed for a Sprite commercial in the United States.

== Awards and nominations ==
=== South African Hip Hop Awards ===
Year	Nominee / work	Award	Result	Ref
2013	"Gusheshe"	Song of the Year	Won	
2013	"Gusheshe"	Best Collaboration	Won	
2013	"Gusheshe"	Video of the Year	Won	
2013	"Gusheshe"	Best Freshman	Won	

== Track listing ==
No.	Title	Writer(s)	Length
1.	"Gusheshe" (featuring Okmalumkoolkat)	Refiloe Maele Phoolo, Smiso Zwane	04:24

== Music video ==
The music video was directed by Nicky Campos and debuted on Vuzu TV's V-Entertainment on 19 July 2013.
