= King Monada =

South African musician

- Born: Khutso Steven Kgatle; November 25, 1992 (age 33); Tzaneen, South Africa
- Genres: Khelobedu house; Afro-pop
- Occupations: Singer-songwriter; record producer
- Years active: 2005-present
- Labels: Open Mic Production (former); King Monada Music; Sony Music Africa

Khutso Steven Kgatle, better known by his stage name King Monada, is a South African singer, comedian songwriter, and record producer. He rose to fame after the release of his 2016 single "Ska Bhora Moreki" and "Malwedhe" (2018), which peaked #9 iTunes Chart and #54 Apple Music Chart. He is known for singing in the Khelobedu language, which are local dialects of Northern Sotho.

== Life and career ==
Khutso Steven Kgatla was born on 25 November 1992 in Tzaneen in Limpopo. Monada has two brothers and two other siblings. He attended school at Sebone Primary School and Magoza High School where he dropped out in Grade 8 to pursue his career in music. On 9 November 2018, Malwedhe was released and voted #2 on Ukhozi FM Song Of The Year.

== Personal life ==
He is married to Lerato Ramawela and Cynthia Nthebatse Leon.

== Discography ==
- Molamo (2016)
- Noka Yao Goma (2020)
- wa mpona na (2022)
- Location (2023)
- Lemenemene (2023)

== Achievements ==
Year	Awards	Category	Results	Ref.
2018	LIMA	Best Khelobedu single	Won	
2018	LIMA	Song of the year	Won	
2018	LIMA	Best duo/Group collaboration	Won	
2020	Dstv MVCA	Favourite Music Artist/Group	Won	
