= IFani =

South African rapper

iFANi
- Also known as: Haymani
- Born: Mzayifani Mzondeleli Boltina; 20 November 1985 (age 40); Mthatha, Eastern Cape, South Africa
- Genres: Hip hop Pop rap
- Occupations: Singer; Songwriter; Rapper
- Years active: 2001–present
- Label: Sony Music

Mzayifani Mzondeleli Boltina, better known as iFani, (born 20 November 1985) is a South African Hip-Hop/Rap artist, MC and television presenter.

Born in Mthatha and raised in New Brighton, Eastern Cape, His first single was "Hola Hater", followed by "Ewe", "Shake", "Milli" released on his album I Believes in Me (1st Quadrant) albums, which was certified Gold by the Recording Industry of South Africa (RiSA) on the day of its release, selling over 20 000 of copies.

He has also pursued a television personality career. iFani made his screen debut on as a presenter of battle reality competition series, Stumbo Stomp Amapantsula. He has also hosted the reality television series Clash of the Choirs, which aired on the channel Mzansi Magic.

== Early life ==
Boltina was born in Mthatha, the Eastern Cape Province of South Africa and was raised in the Port Elizabeth locals of New Brighton and Motherwell. He was a student at the Chapman High School and Ethembeni Enrichment Centre, then went on to study for a BSc (Hons) Computer Science and BSc (Computer Engineering) at University of Cape Town.

Following his graduation, iFani worked as a process control engineer at SABMiller, during which time, he also worked in different styles of music and became involved in a number of hip-hop battles and cyphers as an underground rapper after work. His stage name ‘iFani’ was inspired from a name he adopted from his grandfather, ‘Mzayifani’.

== Career ==
His first single, ‘Hola Haters’ opened to a tepid response in 2009, and gained wider reception once it was picked by the Guateng Radio Station, YFM and featured as one among the ‘Hot 9’ songs on the ‘Hot 9’ chart.

His second single ‘Ewe’ defined his feelings about the South African music industry and the reception for his music. The song, released in 2010, gained significant airplay on pop music stations and charts and was one of his most commercially successful singles till date. The TV channel SABC1 picked ‘Ewe’ as one of the ‘Best Music Videos’ for 2011.

iFani signed a contract with Sony Music Africa in 2012 after the release of his single ‘See Live’. Through the next couple of years, he released a series of successful singles including ‘Shake’ and ‘Milli’, and has collaborated with the artist Blaksuga, with whom he released the track, ‘Chocolate and Vanilla featuring Blaksuga’. ‘Shake’ debuted on Club 808’s Chart at the number 1 position in September 2012.

In 2013 he released his first album ‘I Believes in Me’ (1st Quadrant), with thirteen tracks and collaborations with the artists Blacksuga, Nomsa and Bongani Fassie.

iFani's second album, ‘I Believes in Me’ (2nd Quadrant) released on 29 April 2015 and achieved ‘Gold’ status on the same day of its release. The 2nd Quadrant album also features thirteen tracks, and was also released under Sony Music Africa.

In 2019, iFani was featured by Papzito, a Limpopo rapper, on a song called 'Mokibelo'. An official video for the song released on 29 August 2019. iFani released a new single, 'Sam Sufeketha (Round 2)', in February 2019, after which he released 'Mlandeli Wam', which will be featured on his upcoming album titled, ‘I Believes in Me’ (Third Quadrant).

== Discography ==
=== Studio albums ===
- I Believes In Me (2014)

=== Singles ===
- Amapiano, Pt.1 (2020)
- Vlone Avatar (2020)

== Achievements ==
=== South African Music Awards ===
Year	Nominee / work	Award	Result
2014	I Believes In Me	Best Rap album	Won

=== Eastern Cape Music Awards ===
Year	Nominee / work	Award	Result	Ref.
2015	Himself	Best Hip Hop	Won	
