= Family Tree Records =

South African record label

Family Tree Media
- Founded: 2014 (12 years ago)
- Founder: Cassper Nyovest
- Distributor: Universal Music Group South Africa
- Genre: Hip hop, rap, trap
- Country of origin: South Africa
- Location: Johannesburg, South Africa
- Official website: familytreeworld.co.za

Family Tree Media is a South African independent record label established in 2014 by Cassper Nyovest who currently operates as the CEO.

== Departures ==
=== Tshego ===
On 22 March 2019, Cassper confirmed the departure of Tshego, from Family Tree, on a tweet, with a fan; Cassper tweeted "Tshego left the label almost a year ago". On 6 December 2020, Tshego slammed Cassper, and dragged him out on twitter for using his music under Family Tree without paying him. In the tweet, he also wrote "Been fighting a very silent legal battle, and when I win this case on Monday the humble shit stops". On 10 December 2020, Tshego won court case against Cassper Nyovest and Family Tree Records.

== Artists ==
=== Current acts ===
Act	Year signed	Releases under the label
Cassper Nyovest	2014	7

=== Former acts ===
Act	Year signed	Year left	Releases under the label
Tshego	2016	2018	—
Gemini Major	2016	2020	—
Nadia Nakai	2016	2021	3

== Discography ==
=== Studio albums ===
Year	Artist	Album title	Album details	Certification
2014	Cassper Nyovest	Tsholofelo	Released: July 18, 2014; Label: Family Tree, Kalawa Jazmee, Universal Music South Africa; Formats: CD, digital download	RISA: Platinum
2015	Cassper Nyovest	Refiloe	Released: October 31, 2015; Label: Family Tree, Kalawa Jazmee, Universal Music South Africa; Formats: CD, digital download	RISA: Platinum
2016	Nadia Nakai	Bragga	Released: September 16, 2016; Label: Family Tree; Formats: digital download	
2017	Cassper Nyovest	Thuto	Released: May 5, 2017; Label: Family Tree, Bridge Entertainment, Universal Music South Africa; Formats: CD, digital download	RISA : Platinum
2018	Cassper Nyovest	Sweet and Short	Released: Nov 30, 2018; Label: Family Tree, Bridge Entertainment, Universal Music South Africa; Formats: CD, digital download	RISA : Platinum
2019	Nadia Nakai	Nadia Naked	Released: June 2, 2019; Label: Family Tree; Formats: CD, digital download	
2020	Nadia Nakai	Nadia Naked II	Released: September 4, 2020; Label: Family Tree; Formats: CD, digital download	
2020	Cassper Nyovest	A.M.N (Any Minute Now)	Released: September 11, 2020; Label: Family Tree; Formats: CD, digital download	
2021	Cassper Nyovest	Sweet and Short 2.0	Released: June 30, 2021; Label: Family Tree; Formats: CD, digital download	
