= Cassper Nyovest =

South African rapper (born 1990)

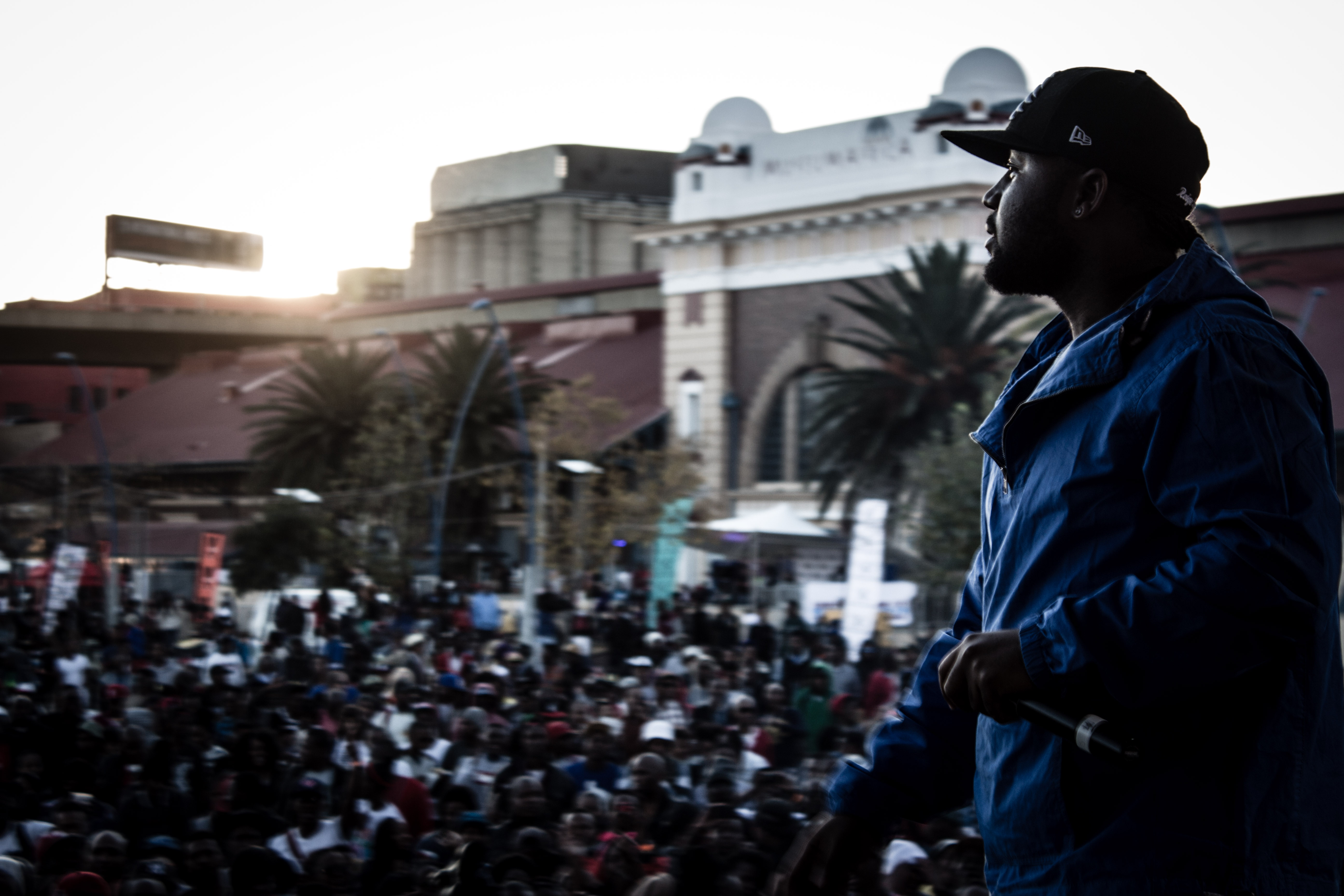
- Cassper Nyovest performing in 2014
- Born: Refiloe Maele Phoolo; 16 December 1990 (age 35); Mahikeng, North West, South Africa
- Education: Grade 10
- Occupations: Rapper; songwriter; record producer; businessman; boxer
- Years active: 2013–present
- Partner: Pulane Mojaki
- Musical career
- Origin: Mahikeng, North-West Province
- Genres: Hip hop; motswako; kwaito; amapiano
- Instruments: Vocals; sampler; drum machine
- Labels: Impact Sounds (former); Family Tree Records; Def Jam Africa; Universal Music Group
- Boxing career

Boxing record
- Total fights: 3
- Wins: 2
- Win by KO: 0
- Losses: 1
- Draws: 0
- Website: casspernyovest.com

Refiloe Maele Phoolo (born 16 December 1990), professionally known as Cassper Nyovest, is a South African rapper, songwriter, entrepreneur, record producer and amateur boxer. Born and raised in Mahikeng, North West, he is regarded as one of the most successful artists in South Africa. In 2014, he established his own record label, Family Tree Records. Nyovest rose to fame with the release of his debut studio album, Tsholofelo (2014) which produced the hit singles "Gusheshe" and "Doc Shebeleza".

With his success of selling out tickets for his concert, Fill Up the Dome (2015) which was held at Ticketpro Dome in Johannesburg. The success of the event pursued Nyovest with the affix "Fill Up" to instigate more concerts in different stadiums annually, including Orlando Stadium (2016) and FNB Stadium (2017), also both in Johannesburg, Moses Mabhida Stadium (2018) in Durban, and Royal Bafokeng Stadium (2019) in North West.

Nyovest released his eponymous studio album, Refiloe, released on 31 October 2015, at his Fill Up The Dome concert. The album collaborates with several artists including The Game, DJ Drama, Stonebwoy and Casey Veggies. He followed this success with his critically acclaimed third studio album Thuto (2018), and his Kwaito-focused fourth studio album, Sweet and Short (2019).

== Early life ==
I told my parents that I'd rather chase my dream, which I believe is going to work out.

— Cassper Nyovest, speaking about his journey of dropping out of school

Refiloe Maele Phoolo was born on 16 December 1990 in Mafikeng, a borough of North West, to Muzuki and Letsebela Phoolo. Nyovest has a sister named Tsholofelo Phoolo; their late brother, Khotso Phoolo, passed on in 2003. Nyovest attended Sol Plaatjie Secondary School where he was an athlete, playing several sports, and he started rapping at the age of 12. In 2006, Nyovest failed his Grade 10 exams; this led to him moving to his grandmother's house in Potchefstroom. After this, in 2007, he decided to formally drop out of high school at the age of 16.

In 2008, Nyovest relocated to Johannesburg, to pursue a career in music as a rapper and producer. He made the move after telling his parents that he would rather pursue his dreams—which he felt were within his reach—rather than playing it “safe” and “regretting it” his whole life.

== Musical career ==
=== 2004–2014: Beginnings and Tsholofelo ===
In 2004, aged just 13, Nyovest formed a hip hop group called Childhood Gangsta with his friends. He then left to join his next group, Slow Motion, which had eight members, including record producer Aashish Gangaram of Ganja Beatz. At age 16, and after dropping out of school, Nyovest signed with motswako record label Impact Sounds, which also signed artists like Tuks Senganga and Morafe (in 2006); the relationship between Nyovest and Impact Sounds eventually soured because of creative differences. In 2008, both parties separated, with Nyovest becoming an independent artist.

Nyovest moved back home, and created his own record label. Before establishing his label, he was discovered by late rapper Hip Hop Pantsula while performing, who featured Nyovest on his song "Wamo Tseba Mtho".

Nyovest released his debut single, "Gusheshe" (featuring Okmalumkoolkat), in 2013 and, in 2014, established his record label named Family Tree Records. His second single, "Doc Shebeleza", was released the same year, and named after kwaito artist Doc Shebeleza. The song received positive reviews from the public, and was praised by notable acts, such as singer Yvonne Chaka Chaka.

On 18 July 2014, Nyovest released his debut album Tsholofelo, named after his sister. The album was an outstanding success, peaking at #1 on the iTunes SA (South African) albums chart for two consecutive months (July and August 2014). In October 2014, Nyovest was ranked as the top artist on the MTV Base show The Hottest MC in Africa, and was ranked no. 2 on “MTV SA's Hottest MCs” that same year.

=== 2015–2016: Refiloe ===
With the success of Tsholofelo, Nyovest released a platinum edition of the album; this included new songs and collaborations with Casey Veggies, DJ Drama, Wizkid and Anatii. The platinum edition was released on 17 April 2015, with a limit of 10,000 copies printed.

At the end of the third quarter of 2015, Nyovest announced his intention of headlining a concert called Fill Up The Dome at the Ticketpro Dome, Johannesburg, on 31 October 2015. He was quoted as saying, "I want to fill the dome, which currently accommodates up to 20,000 people ... to its full capacity". He also announced that his second album, titled Refiloe, will be released on the day of the event.

On 14 August 2015, Nyovest released “Mama I Made It” (#MIMI), the lead single from his second album, and one of the promotional songs for the Fill Up The Dome concert. Nyovest managed to sell out all tickets for his event, as he predicted; on 25 October 2015, this was announced via his Twitter account. On the day of the event, ticket buyers received a complimentary copy of the Refiloe album. This promotion resulted in the album being certified gold on that very day. The album was then certified platinum for shipments in excess of 40,000 copies, domestically.

Nyovest then announced a second event, Fill Up Orlando Stadium, to be held at Orlando Stadium, Soweto, in Johannesburg on 29 October 2016–two days prior to the Ticketpro Dome event. The event was a success, and there was a total of 40,000 people (stadium's capacity) in attendance. A combined total of around 80,000 people attended both concerts. For both 2015 and 2016, Nyovest was ranked no. 1 on MTV Base: SA's Hottest MCs list. He was also ranked no. 1 on the 2016 Hottest Rapper in Africa since 2014.

=== 2017–2019: Thuto and Sweet and Short ===
On 4 March 2017, Nyovest released the lead single "Tito Mboweni" from his third album Thuto. Named after the South Africa's Minister of Finance and former SARB governor Tito Mboweni, the song commercially trended for its lyric quote, "Shaa Shaa" which is an onomatopoeia for a money note sound.

Thuto was released on 5 May 2017. It was certified gold by RiSA on the day of its release and was then certified platinum within the following weeks. Nyovest announced his third "Fill Up" event, which was held on 17 November 2017, at the 94,736 capacity stadium, FNB Stadium, Johannesburg. The event was planned to fill only 75,000 of its capacity which was his biggest challenge. Nyovest had some struggles in funding the show, but finally got 3 major sponsors in assisting him: Cîroc SA, SABC 1 and Budweiser. The event did not sell all its tickets but was a success.

In 2018, Nyovest released his fourth album Sweet and Short. The album was certified platinum on its day of release. Nyovest's following "Fill Up" event venue was at Moses Mabhida Stadium, Durban which was scheduled on 1 December 2018. He managed to sell 68,000 tickets which was a favorable outcome. The following day, Nyovest performed at the Motsepe Foundation presented event, Global Citizen Festival: Mandela 100 headlined by the Carters. At the Mzansi Kwaito and House Music Awards, his single "Gets Getsa 2.0" won Best New Age Kwaito Song award. On 15 December 2019, Nyovest performed at his fifth annual "Fill Up" event which was held at the Royal Bafokeng Stadium in Rustenburg, a city of North West – the province where he was born. After being criticized by hip hop fans for leaving the genre, Nyovest returned in 2020 with a hip hop track titled Good For That.

=== 2020–2022: Any Minute Now, Sweet and Short 2.0 ===
On September 11, 2020, his fifth studio album Any Minute Now was released. The album features Zola 7, Samthing Soweto, Langa Mavuso, Tellaman, YoungstaCPT, Busiswa, Nadia Nakai, Khuli Chana, Tuks, Mo' Molemi, Towdee Mac and DJ Lemonka.

At the 2020 South African Hip Hop Awards he won three awards includes; "Song of the Year", "Album of the Year" and "Best Male".

On July 30, 2021, Cassper dropped his first ever Amapiano studio album Sweet And Short 2.0, which consists of 10 tracks featuring Abidoza, Samthing Soweto, LuuDadeejay, Kammu Dee, Lady Du, Ma Lemon, Semi Tee, Boohle, DJ Sumbody, Reece Madlisa, Thulz, and Zuma. On September 4, 2021, he embarked to United Kingdom for AmaFest Tour along with DJ Maphorisa, DBN Gogo and Focalistic to promote Amapiano genre.

Cassper appeared on collaboration "Umjolo" with Abidoza and Boohle released on September 30, 2021.

=== 2023-present: Solomon, African Throne World Tour ===
Cassper announced his studio album Solomon, towards the end of May, which was set to be released on July 28, 2023.

In May 2023, Cassper Nyovest and Nasty C announced African Throne World Tour, which includes 12 dates. It will run from August 18, Arusha, Tanzania until 28 October 28, Johannesburg, South Africa.

The album was postponed and announced single "018" featuring Maglera Doe Boy. The song was released on September 15, 2023, as albums lead single.

Solomon was released on September 15, 2023. It charted number 1 in South Africa.

=== Television ===
On September 9, 2021, he became a host of The Braai show with Cass that airs on SABC 1.

Towards the end of July 2026, Nyovest and Zanele Potelwa were announced as the hosts of the 32nd South African Music Awards night 2 ceremony.

== Business ventures ==
=== Endorsements ===
Nyovest garnered several endorsement deals with various companies, notably with vodka brand, Ciroc which is one of his biggest endorsement deal in his career so far. Their endorsement began in 2017, when Nyovest displayed in his music video, Tito Mboweni several Cîroc bottles. Ciroc then unveiled their deal with Nyovest. In 2015, Nyovest endorsed with MTN and AG Mobile in launching a smartphone named, AG Hashtag which was inspired and partly designed by him. He also endorsed with other brands including, Shoprite, Samsung South Africa, Coca-Cola, KFC SA, Castle Lite, Nike SA and Bitcasino.

=== Family Tree Records ===
As an entrepreneur, Nyovest has founded the Family Tree Records. The record label was established in 2014 after his departure of label, Impact Soundz.

=== Root of Fame ===
In July 2021, he founded a sneaker company Root of Fame, under Drip Footwear.

=== Billiato ===
On September 6, 2021, he launched his own liquor brand named Billiato.

== Boxing ==
=== Fame vs Clout ===
On 22 December 2021, Nyovest held a boxing match in which he won against YouTuber, Slik Talk.

=== Actor vs Musician ===
A boxing match titled "Actor vs Musician" was held at Sun City Stadium on the 9th of April 2022. Cassper Nyovest lost to NaakMusiQ after taking him on to the fifth round.

== Personal life ==
In July 2015, after months of denying any romantic involvement with each other, Nyovest and actress Boity Thulo finally confirmed (in a July issue of DRUM) that they were dating. The headline on the cover of the magazine implied that the couple was engaged, but Nyovest and Thulo later denied this, claiming that the magazine used the headline as a ploy to increase their sales. The couple broke up in December 2015.

== Controversies ==
=== Feuds ===
In 2014, Nyovest was embroiled in a feud with long-time rival, AKA. As Nyovest claimed his song "Doc Shebeleza" was the biggest song in South African Hip-Hop, AKA who was promoting his new single "Congratulate", showed contradiction when he tweeted, "There's a rapper running around saying he got the biggest song in the country ... I challenge you to find his song in the iTunes Top 100". Thereafter, Nyovest responded with a tweet stating reasons why his song was bigger than AKA's. The argument escalated as both rappers were responding to each other multiple times. In August 2014, the pair were scheduled to both perform on SABC 1 music show, Live Amp when a member of AKA's entourage allegedly pulled a gun on Cassper and his team. Further controversy arose in 2015, when Cassper accused AKA of slapping him which led both rappers to release diss tracks. In 2018 when Nyovest was asked about the status of his feud with AKA, he stated the two would never reconcile, which has so far proven true.

=== Lawsuits and civil disputes ===
In 2018, Xitsonga musician, Benny Mayengani was to do his concert named, #FillUpGiyaniStadium. As Mayengani used a similar affix ("Fill Up"/"#FillUp") as Nyovest, Nyovest then accused Mayengani for using his trademark in a form of sending him a cease and desist letter. Investigation revealed that Nyovest does not yet own the #FillUp trademark and can not take any action.

== Awards and nominations ==
Nyovest has been awarded and nominated for various music awards both locally and internationally. His first set of awards were in 2013 when he won four awards at the second edition of the South Africa Hip Hop Awards. On 13 April 2018, he received a nomination at the 12th Headies Award in Nigeria in the category of Best African Artiste alongside Nasty C, Sarkodie from Ghana, Kenyan group Sauti Sol, and Tanzanian singer Vanessa Mdee.

== Discography ==
Studio albums

- Tsholofelo (2014)
- Refiloe (2015)
- Thuto (2017)
- Sweet and Short (2018)
- A.M.N (Any Minute Now) (2020)
- Sweet and Short 2.0 (2021)
- Solomon (2023)
