= AKA discography =

- Studio albums: 5
- EPs: 1
- Singles: 42
- Music videos: 23
- Collaborative albums: 2

South African hip hop artist and record producer AKA has released four studio albums, two collaborative albums with Anatii as well as Costa Titch respectively, one extended play (EP), 42 singles (including 20 as a featured artist) and 23 music videos. AKA's music has been released on record labels Sony Music Entertainment Africa, Vth Season and Beam Group.

AKA's debut studio album Altar Ego, was released on 23 August 2011 and issued on independent record label Vth Season. The album was preceded by three singles. The lead single "I Want It All" which features rappers, Khuli Chana and Pro was released on 28 July 2010. The second single "Victory Lap" was released on 3 December 2010 with the third single "All I Know" being released on 11 July 2011. Alter Ego won Best Newcomer, Best Hip Hop Album and Best Produced Album at the 2011 Metro FM Music Awards which took place on 26 November 2011 at Mbombela Stadium in Mbombela (Nelspruit), Mpumalanga. The album also won Best Street Urban Music Album and Male Artist of the Year at the 18th edition of the South African Music Awards (SAMAs) which were held at Sun City, North West on 30 April 2012. Alter Ego was certified gold by the Recording Industry of South Africa (RiSA).

AKA's second debut studio album Levels was released on 30 June 30, 2014. The album's release was preceded by four singles "Jealousy", "Kontrol", "Congratulate" and "Run Jozi (Godly)" which features rapper, K.O. Originally slated for physical release on 8 July 2014, the hard copies of the album were later released on 28 July 2014 due to manufacturing issues. Levels won Best Male, Video of the Year for "Congratulate", and Best Collaboration for "Run Jozi (Godly)" at the 2014 South African Hip Hop Awards and won Male Artist of the Year at the 21st South African Music Awards which took place on 19 April 2015 at Sun City, North West. Levels is certified 7× Platinum by RiSA. On 28 July 2017, AKA released the collaborative studio album Be Careful What You Wish For with South African record producer and musician Anatii.

On 15 June 2018, AKA released his third and last solo studio album Touch My Blood which was issued on his independent record label Beam Group. The album was originally set to release on 25 May 2018 but delayed because he needed more time to shoot videos, release singles, drop merchandise and confirm tour dates. Touch My Blood was preceded by five singles, "The World Is Yours" and "Caiphus Song" which are certified triple platinum and gold respectively by RiSA. "Star Signs" which features South African rapper and poet Stogie T, "Sweet Fire" and "Beyonce" also preceded the album. Touch My Blood is certified Platinum by the Recording Industry of South Africa (RiSA). In 2019 he released "Jika" with Yanga Chief.

AKA's fourth studio album Mass Country was released posthumously on February 24, 2023, through Sony and Vth A. It reached 6 million+ streams on Spotify and certified gold in South Africa.

== Albums ==
=== Studio albums ===
List of studio albums, with selected chart positions and certifications
Title	Album details	Peak chart positions	Certifications
Title	Album details	ZA	Certifications
Altar Ego	Released: 23 August 2011; Label: Vth Season; Formats: CD, Digital download	1	RiSA: Platinum
Levels	Released: June 30, 2014; Label: Vth Season, SME Africa; Formats: CD, Digital download, Vinyl	1	RiSA: Diamond
Be Careful What You Wish For (with Anatii)	Released: 28 July 2017; Label: BEAM Group, YAL Entertainment, SME Africa; Formats: CD, Digital download	—	
Touch My Blood	Released: 15 June 2018; Label: Beam Group; Formats: CD, Digital download	1	RiSA: 3× Platinum
Mass Country	Released: 24 February 2023; Label: Sony, Vth A; Formats: Streaming, Digital download	1	RiSA: Platinum
"—" denotes a recording that did not chart or was not released in that territory.

=== Extended plays ===
List of extended plays, with selected information
Title	EP details
24/7/366	Released: 2009; Label: self-released; Formats: Digital download
Bhovamania	Released: 2020; Formats: Digital download

== Singles ==
=== As lead artist ===
List of singles as lead artist, with selected chart positions and certifications, showing year released and album name
Title	Year	Peak chart positions			Certifications	Album
Title	Year	ZA	UK	US	Certifications	Album
"Victory Lap"	2010	—	—	—		Altar Ego
"I Want It All" (featuring Pro & Khuli Chana)	2010	—	—	—		Altar Ego
"All I Know"	2011	—	—	—		Altar Ego
"Bang" (featuring Khuli Chana)	2011	—	—	—		Altar Ego
"Jealousy"	2012	—	—	—		Levels
"Kontrol" (featuring Da L.E.S)	2013	—	—	—		Levels
"Congratulate"	2014	2	—	—	RiSA: Gold	Levels
"Run Jozi (Godly)" (featuring K.O)	2014	—	—	—	RiSA: Gold	Levels
"All Eyes on Me" (featuring Burna Boy, JR and Da L.E.S)	2014	—	—	—	RiSA: Platinum	Levels
"Sim Dope"	2015	—	—	—		Levels
"Baddest" (featuring Burna Boy, Khuli Chana and Yanga Chief)	2015	—	—	—	RiSA: Gold	Non-album singles
"Composure"	2015	—	—	—	RiSA: Gold	Non-album singles
"Dreamwork" (featuring Yanga Chief)	2016	—	—	—	RiSA:5× Diamond	Non-album singles
"One Time"	2016	—	—	—	RiSA: Diamond	Non-album singles
"The World Is Yours"	2016	—	—	—	RiSA: 8× Platinum	Touch My Blood
"10 Fingers" (with Anatii)	2017	—	—	—		Be Careful What You Wish For
"Caiphus Song"	2017	—	—	—	RiSA: 8× Platinum	Touch My Blood
"Don't Forget to Pray" (with Anatii)	2017	—	—	—		Be Careful What You Wish For
"Star Signs" (featuring Stogie T)	2018	—	—	—	RiSA: Gold	Touch My Blood
"Sweet Fire"	2018	—	—	—		Touch My Blood
"Beyonce"	2018	—	—	—	RiSA: Gold	Touch My Blood
"Fully In"	2018	—	—	—		Touch My Blood
"Fela in Versace" (featuring Kiddominant)	2018	—	—	—	RiSA: 4× Platinum	Touch My Blood
Jika (featuring Yanga Chief)	2019	—	—	—		Touch My Blood
"Main Ous" (featuring YoungstaCPT)	2019	—	—	—		Non-album singles
"F.R.E.E" (featuring Riky Rick & DJ Tira	2019	—	—	—		Non-album singles
"Lemons (Lemonade)" (with Nasty C)	2022	2			RiSA: 5× Platinum	Mass Country
"Paradise" (featuring Musa Keys, Gyakie & Zadok)	2022	—	—	—		Mass Country
"Prada" (featuring Khuli Chana)	2023	—	—	—		Mass Country
"Company (Remix)" (with KDDO & Kabza De Small)	2023	—	—	—		Non-Album Single
"—" denotes a recording that did not chart or was not released in that territory.

=== As featured artist ===
List of singles as featured artist, with selected chart positions and certifications, showing year released and album name
Title	Year	Peak chart positions			Certifications	Album
Title	Year	ZA	UK	US	Certifications	Album
"Heaven" (Da L.E.S featuring AKA and Maggz)	2013	—	—	—		Mandela Money
"Hit 'Em Up" (X-Static featuring AKA and Priddy Ugly)	2013	—	—	—		Non-album singles
"N Word (Remix)" (Ice Prince featuring AKA)	2014	—	—	—		Non-album singles
"Tsiki Tsiki (Remix)" (Duncan featuring Professor, AKA and Mampintsha)	2014	—	—	—		Non-album singles
"Tsekede (Remix)" (Dreamteam featuring Tamarsha, Big Nuz and AKA)	2014	—	—	—		Non-album singles
"Bump the Cheese Up (Remix)" (Reason featuring AKA, Okmalumkoolkat and Tol A$$ Mo)	2014	—	—	—		Non-album singles
"God's Will" (DJ Vigilante featuring AKA and K.O.)	2014	—	—	—		Non-album singles
"Awuth' Yam (Remix)" (Yanga featuring Kid X and AKA)	2015	—	—	—		Non-album singles
"The Saga" (Anatii featuring AKA)	2015	—	—	—		Artiifact
"P.A.I.D" (Da L.E.S featuring AKA and Burna Boy)	2015	—	—	—		North God
"Yipikayay" (Reason featuring AKA and Khuli Chana)	2015	—	—	—		Audio Re-Definition
"Roll Up (Re-Up)" (Emtee featuring Wizkid and AKA)	2015	—	—	—	RiSA: 3× Platinum	Avery
"Lie 2 Me" (Ma-E featuring AKA)	2016	—	—	—		Township Counsellor
"Real Stuff" (Da L.E.S featuring AKA and Maggz)	2016	—	—	—		North God
"Day One" (Kwesta featuring AKA and Tweezy)	2016	—	—	—		DaKAR II
"Make Me Sing" (Diamond Platnumz featuring AKA)	2016	—	—	—		Non-album singles
"Hello" (LayLizzy featuring AKA)	2016	—	—	—		Non-album singles
"Bounce" (Stanley Enow featuring AKA and Locko)	2016	—	—	—		Non-album singles
"Bang Out" (DJ Vigilante featuring K.O., Nasty C and AKA)	2016	—	—	—		Non-album singles
"On Code" (M.I featuring AKA)	2018	—	—	—		Non-album singles
"No Rush" (DJ Tira & Prince Bulo featuring Okmalumkoolkat and AKA)	2018	—	—	—		Non-album singles
"Lost Hills" (Vato Kayde featuring AKA and Gator) Beautiful Night	2018	—	—	—		Non-album singles
"No Favors" (L Tido featuring AKA)	2018	—	—	—		16
"—" denotes a recording that did not chart or was not released in that territory.

== Guest appearances ==
List of non-single guest appearances, with other performing artists, showing year released and album name
Title	Year	Other artist(s)	Album
"Hape Le Hape, Part 1"	2012	Khuli Chana, Zeus, Reason, Towdee Mac, Kay Gizm	Lost in Time
"Tswa Daar (Remix)"	2012	Khuli Chana, Ice Prince, Reason, Maggz, Navio, Ice Queen	Lost in Time
"Dirty Politician"	2013	Da L.E.S, Junior Prez	Mandela Money
"I Wish"	2013	Professor	The Orientation
"Return of the King (Intro)"	2015	Tumi	Return of the King
"Talk That Shit"	2015	Dreamteam, Ice Prince	Dreams Never Die
"Miss Joburg"	2016	Stogie T	Stogie T
"Money over B****es"	2016	Da L.E.S, Maggz	Diamond in Africa
"Mega Milano"	2016	Okmalumkoolkat, Mashayabhuqe Ka Mamba	Mlazi Milano
"On Code"	2018	M.I Abaga	Rendezvous
"Oh Well"	2018	DJ Sliqe, Sy Ari Da Kid	Navy Black

== Music videos ==
=== As lead artist ===
List of music videos as lead artist, showing year released and directors
Title	Year	Director(s)
"I Want It All" (featuring Pro & Khuli Chana)	2009	none
"Victory Lap"	2010	AKA
"All I Know"	2011	Bruce Patterson
"Bang" (featuring Khuli Chana)	2011	Bruce Patterson
"Jealousy"	2012	
"Kontrol" (featuring Da L.E.S)	2013	Yanga Ntshakaza
"Congratulate"	2014	Amr Singh, AKA
"Run Jozi (Godly)" (featuring K.O)	2014	Yanga Ntshakaza
"All Eyes on Me" (featuring Burna Boy, JR and Da L.E.S)	2014	Yanga Ntshakaza
"Sim Dope"	2015	Yanga Ntshakaza
"Composure"	2015	
"Baddest" (featuring Burna Boy, Khuli Chana and Yanga)	2015	
"Make Me Sing" (with Diamond Platnumz)	2016	Nicky Campos
"Dreamwork" (featuring Yanga)	2016	Adriaan Louw
"One Time"	2016	Don Design
"10 Fingers" (with Anatii)	2017	Anatii, David East
"The World Is Yours"	2017	Alessio Bettocchi, AKA, Prince Costinyo
"Caiphus Song"	2017	Alessio Bettocchi
"Don't Forget to Pray" (with Anatii)	2017	Alessio Bettocchi
"Starsigns" (featuring Stogie T)	2018	Alessio Bettocchi
"Fully In"	2018	Alessio Bettocchi
"Main Ou's" (with YoungstaCPT)	2019	Studio Space Pictures
"F.R.E.E" (featuring Riky Rick & DJ Tira)	2019	Nate Thomas
