= Tweezy production discography =

The discography of South African record producer, Tweezy. It includes a list of songs produced, co-produced and remixed by year, artists, album and title.

== Singles produced ==
List of singles produced, with selected chart positions and certifications, showing year released and album name
Title	Year	Peak chart positions	Certification	Album
Title	Year	South Africa (EMA)	Certification	Album
"Oh My" (Ghetto Prophecy)	2011	—		Non-album single
"Run Jozi (Godly)" (AKA featuring K.O & Yanga)	2014	—	RiSA: Gol	Levels
"All Eyes On Me" (AKA featuring Burna Boy, JR & Da L.E.S)	2014	—	RiSA: Platinum	Levels
"Bheka Mina Ngedwa" (The Fraternity)	2014	—		Non-album singles
"Soena Papa" (JR)	2014	—		Non-album singles
"What You Like" (DJ Capital featuring Kwesta & Kyle Deutsch)	2015	—		Non-album singles
"Sim Dope" (AKA)	2015	—		Levels
"What's Your Name" (Dreamteam featuring NaakMusiQ & Donald)	2015	—		Dreams Never Die
"iLife" (DJ Sliqe featuring JR & WTF)	2015	—		Injayam Vol. 1
"The Realest" (Tweezy & Reason)	2015	—		Non-album singles
"Dlala Ka Yona" (L-Tido)	2015	—		Non-album singles
"Party Till Ekseni" (E-Jay)	2015	—		Non-album singles
"Get Lit" (E-Jay)	2015	—		Non-album singles
"Talk That Shit" (Dreamteam featuring AKA & Ice Prince)	2015	—		Dreams Never Die
"Bheka Mina Ngedwa Amplified" (The Fraternity featuring DJ Speedsta, Blaklez, Duncan, Stilo Magolide, Smashis & Xoli M)	2015	—		Non-album single
"Kuze Kuse" (Fifi Cooper featuring Emtee)	2015	—		20FIFI
"Baddest" (AKA featuring Burna Boy, Yanga and Khuli Chana)	2015	—	RiSA: Gold	Levels
"Ingane Zobaba" (B1 featuring Tweezy & Thiaps)	2015	—		Non-album single
"Celebration" (DJ Speedsta featuring Bucie & KiD X)	2016	—		The Guy (016 To The World)
"Ameni" (Miss Pru DJ featuring Fifi Cooper, Emtee, B3nchMarQ, A-Reece, Saudi and Sjava)	2016	—		Non-album single
"Mbongo-Zaka" (Rouge featuring Moozlie)	2016	—		The New Era Sessions
"Sidlukotini" (Riky Rick)	2016	—		Non-album single
"iVibe" (Chad)	2016	—		The Book of Chad
"Big Dreams" (Stogie T)	2016	—		Stogie T
"Diamond Walk" (Stogie T)	2016	—		Stogie T
"Mercy" (DJ Sliqe featuring Riky Rick, Reason, Kwesta and Thaiwanda)	2016	—		Injayam Vol. 1
"All On Me" (B3nchMarQ)	2016	—		Non-album single
"Bay 2" (DJ Sliqe featuring AKA, Yanga and JR)	2016	—		Injayam Vol. 1
"Jumanji" (Tweezy)	2017	—		Non-album single
"On It" (DJ Sliqe featuring Shekhinah)	2017	—		Injayam Vol. 1
"No Pressure" (Neo)	2017	—		Non-album singles
"Fuego" (Tweezy)	2017	—		Non-album singles
"New School Bully" (Kid Tini)	2017	—		Non-album singles
"Corner Store" (Emtee)	2017	—		Manando
"King" (Nasty C featuring A$AP Ferg)	2018	—		Strings And Bling
"—" denotes a recording that did not chart or was not released in that territory.

== 2014 ==
=== AKA - Levels ===
- 01. "Levels" (produced with Sticky and Master A Flat)
- 02. "Sim Dope" (produced with Sticky)
- 03. "Run Jozi (Godly)" (featuring K.O) (produced with Sticky and Master A Flat)
- 06. "All Eyes On Me" (featuring Burna Boy, Da L.E.S & JR)

== 2015 ==
=== Emtee - Avery ===
- 10. "Pikipiki"
- 17. "Five-O"

=== Fifi Cooper - 20Fifi ===
- 08. "Kuze Kuse" (featuring Emtee)

=== Dreamteam - Dreams Never Die ===
- 04. "S'hamba Kanje"
- 11. "Talk That Shit" (featuring Ice Prince and AKA)
- 14. "What's Your Name" (featuring NaakMusiQ and Donald)

== 2016 ==
=== Chad - The Book of Chad ===
- 09. "Chad is Better"
- 11. "Vibe"

=== A-Reece - Paradise ===
- 01. "Paradise"
- 08. "Ama Hater"

=== Stogie T - Stogie T ===
- 02. "Big Dreams"
- 04. "Diamond Walk"
- 14. "Clean Stuff" (featuring Nasty C) (produced with Co-Kayn Beats)

=== DJ Sliqe - Injayam, Vol. 1 ===
- 03. "Mzonkonko" (featuring Blaklez & Ginger Trill) (produced with Psyfo)
- 04. "Bay 2" (featuring AKA, Yanga & JR) (produced with Psyfo)
- 05. "Ayay" (featuring Yanga & Maggz) (produced with Psyfo)
- 06. "iLife" (featuring JR, Okmalumkoolkat & WTF)
- 07. "Mercy" (featuring Riky Rick, Kwesta, Reason & Thaiwanda)
- 08. "Flexin'" (featuring Tweezy, Stilo Magolide & Smashis) (produced with Psyfo)
- 09. "Oceans" (featuring Da L.E.S & Shane Eagle) (produced with Psyfo)
- 10. "On It" (featuring Shekhinah) (produced with Psyfo)
- 11. "I Know" (featuring Big Star & Cass) (produced with Psyfo)
- 12. "Toxic" (featuring BK)
- 13. "Spaces" (featuring Priddy Ugly & Wichi 1080) (produced with Psyfo & Wichi 1080)

== 2017 ==
=== Emtee - Manando ===
- 05. "Plug"
- 13. "Corner Store"

== 2018 ==
=== AKA - Touch My Blood ===
- 01. "Touch My Blood" (produced with DJ Maphorisa)
- 02. "Fully In"
- 05. "Amen" (featuring L-Tido)
