= South African Hip Hop Awards 2015 =

Music awards ceremony in South Africa

- Date: 9 December 2015
- Location: Lyric Theatre, Gold Reef City Casino; Johannesburg, Gauteng
- Country: South Africa
- Presented by: BET Networks
- Website: www.sahiphopawards.com

Television/radio coverage
- Network: e.tv

The 2015 South African Hip Hop Awards were held at The Lyric Theatre, Gold Reef City Casino in Johannesburg, Gauteng Province. This marked the ceremony's 4th anniversary.

The nominees were announced on 30 October 2015. Riky Rick lead with 8 nominations, followed by AKA with 7 nominations. AKA won the "Most Valuable" award for the 4th time in a row, making him the only artist to ever win this award, and therefore currently holds the winning streak. AKA won the most awards: Best Collaboration, Most Valuable, Video of the Year and Best Digital Sales. AKA makes an appearance in six categories, and lost in one category Song of the Year to newcomer and mentee Emtee for his major debut single "Roll Up". At the age of 18 at the time of the ceremony, Nasty C was the youngest recipient of an award, namely the Best Freshman Award. All winners were announced at the ceremony on 9 December 2015. The ceremony was first aired on 31 December on South African Broadcast television channel e.TV.

== Nominations and winners ==
The following is a list of nominees. The winners were initially announced on 9 December 2015 at the ceremony.

Album Of The Year	Best Collaboration
Riky Rick - Family Values; Reason - Audio HD; Proverb - Red Tape; Tumi - Return of the King; Zakwe - Impande	DJ Speedsta - Special Somebody; featuring Cassper Nyovest, Riky Rick and Anatii; Anatii - The Saga; featuring AKA; OkMalumkoolkat - Mswenkofontein; featuring Stilo Magolide, uSanele and Sibot; Nadia Nakai - Saka Wena; featuring Ice Prince; AKA - Baddest; featuring Khuli Chana, Burna Boy and Yanga; DJ Sliqe - iLife; featuring WTF and OkMalumkoolkat; DJ Dimplez - Way Up; featuring Cassper Nyovest and JR; DJ Sliqe - Do Like I Do; featuring Kwesta and Flabba; Gigi Lamayne - Ice Cream (Remix); featuring Khuli Chana; Reason - Endurance; featuring Hip Hop Pantsula
Best Dance Crew	Best Female
Creed Crew; Supreme I Crew; EDC; 2 Legitt Crew; Freeze Frame	Assessa - Yim Lo; C'Ro - First Foray
Best Freshman	Best Graffiti Artist
Assessa - Yim Lo; Jonny Joburg - King Jonny Cometh; Mthinay Tsunam - The Beginning; Aewon Wolf - Darkest Winter; Nasty C - Price City	MARS; RIOT; PSALM 1; GIFT
Best International Brand	Best Local Brand
Red Bull; Sprite; Miller; KFC	Butan; Head Honcho; GALXBOY; Ama Kip Kip
Best Male	Mixtape of the Year
Riky Rick - Family Values; Tumi - Return of the King; Zakwe - Impande; Reason - Audio HD; Proverb - Red Tape	DJ Dimplez - Zeal; Fortune - Abomrapper 2; Okmalumkoolkat - 100K Ma Cassette; Ejay - Apartheid: Black & White; Aewon Wolf - Darkest Winter
Best Radio Show	DJ of the Year
Headwarmerz - Bush Radio; The Hip Hop Floor - YFM; Ground Zero - TruFM; The Stir Up - 5FM; Namba Namba - Ukhozi FM; 16 Bars Reloaded - UJ FM; VenRap Radio; The Ready D Show - Good Hope FM; Trail Blazer - SK FM; The Mixtape - Alex FM	DJ Dimplez; Junior De Rock; DJ Speedsta; DJ Capital; Major League DJs
King of Eastern Cape	King of Free State
Yahkeem Ben Israel; Lungelo "TruSenz" Nzama; Tsviel The Prince	Dithato Mogoiwa; Thabo Tsasane; Kulax Khaile
Honorary Award	Hustler of the Year
DJ Ready D	Nema Wama Hunghuni; Khuli Chana; Cassper Nyovest; Riky Rick; Proverb
King of Gauteng	King of Kwa-Zulu Natal
Refiloe Ramogase; DJ Dimplez; DJ ID	Ntsika Seoka; Lindo "Prowjekt" Twala; Bon Hussla
King of Limpopo	Milestone Award
Hip Hop Live SA; Nema Wama Hunghuni; Culprit	Cassper Nyovest; Platinum Album; AKA; Gold Album; 3 Gold Singles
Most Valuable	King of Mpumalanga
AKA; Cassper Nyovest; Proverb; Riky Rick; DJ Dimplez	Marvin Straight; Ecks Exodus Nkosingiphile; Thabs Tha Acid
King of Northern Cape	King of North West
Shirm Moipolai; Kgomotso Modiragale; Malibongwe Vongs Vuntu	DJ Lemonka; Amos Ofentse Tapile; Thabiso "Lunchboy" Tshabalala
Producer of the Year	Promoter of the Year
Riky Rick; Anatii; Tweezy; Gemini Major; Ganja Beatz	Maftown Heights; Authentic Sundays; Homecoming Picnic; Pop Bottles; Str Crd
Song of the Year	Video of the Year
Riky Rick - Boss Zonke; Khuli Chana - Mahamba Yedwa; Anatii featuring AKA - The Saga; Major League DJs featuring Cassper Nyovest, Riky Rick and Okmalumkoolkat - Slyza Totsi; L-Tido - Dlala Ka Yona; Emtee - Roll Up; DJ Sliqe featuring Kwesta and Flabba - Do Like I Do; AKA featuring Khuli Chana, Burna Boy and Yanga - Baddest; Gigi Lamayne featuring Khuli Chana - Ice Cream (Remix); WTF - Nomusa	AKA featuring Burna Boy, JR and Da L.E.S - All Eyes on Me; Anatii featuring AKA - The Saga; Khuli Chana - Mahamba Yedwa; Riky Rick featuring Zano - Sondela; WTF - Nomusa; L-Tido - Dlala Ka Yona; Da L.E.S featuring AKA and Burna Boy - P.A.I.D; AKA - Sim Dope; DJ Speedsta featuring Cassper Nyovest, Riky Rick and Anatii - Special Somebody; Cassper Nyovest featuring Anatii and DJ Drama - Ghetto
King of Western Cape	Lyricist of the Year
Curtleigh Louw; Rheebongs; Zanzolo Uzwi Kantu	Tumi - Return of the King; Proverb - The Read Tape; Reason - Audio High Definition; Zakwe - Impande; Ginger Breadman - Mo Better
Best Digital Sales	
AKA; Tumi; Riky Rick; DJ Dimplez; Zakwe	

== See also ==
- South African Hip Hop Awards
