= Monexus =

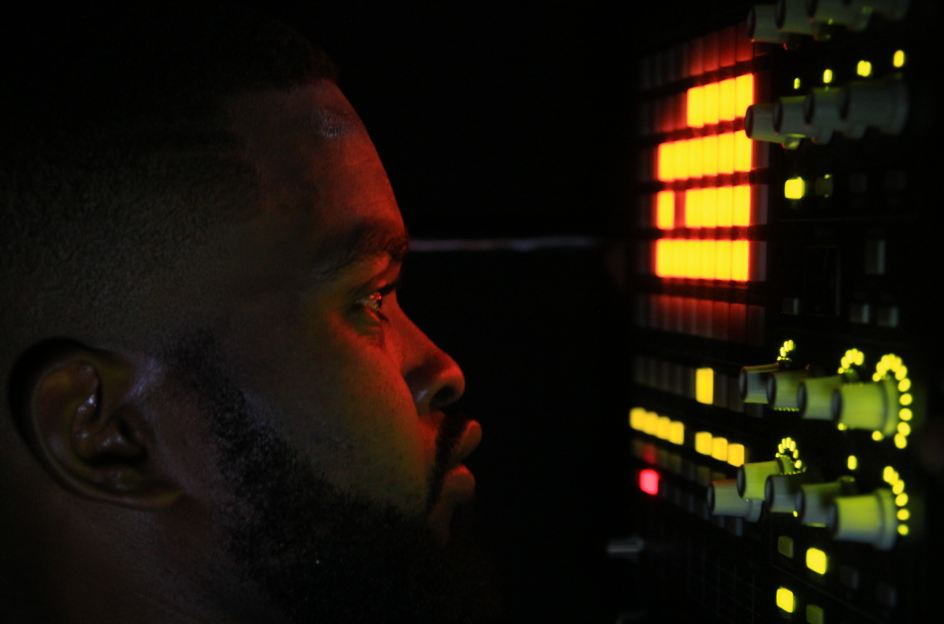

Background information
- Also known as: Monexus, Monex, Nex, Purple Swank
- Born: Moemedi Michael Poncana; November 16, 1986 (age 38); Jwaneng, Botswana
- Genres: Alternative hip hop; Experimental; Neo psychedelia; Electronica
- Occupations: record producer; songwriter
- Years active: 2009–present
- Labels: Jamenex Music; Spoilt Brat Music; Sheer Music
- Website: www.monexusmusic.com

Moemedi Michael Poncana (born November 16, 1986), better known by his stage name Monexus, is a South African hip hop and electronic and record producer, from Jwaneng, Botswana. Monexus released his debut instrumental mixtape DbS7 Volume 1: The Root, in 2011. He subsequently released 6 more instrumental mixtapes between 2011 – 2015. In August 2015, he released his debut instrumental album 7 Of Cups which was well received by music critics. In November 2015, he released his second album Heat July Cold which was also well received by music critics.

== Early life ==
Monexus was born Moemedi Poncana on November 16, 1986, in Jwaneng, Botswana. His father was from the Eastern Cape, South Africa. He has a younger sister (Renee) and a younger brother (Mzwandile). Monexus started composing songs at age 9, while he was in Northside Primary School (Gaborone, Botswana). He learnt how to play the piano from his grandfather. Around the same time, he joined the school orchestra playing the recorder, as well as the school's marimba band. Monexus grew up admiring Huntington Beach, California, punk rock band The Offspring. He was also influenced by J Dilla, Q-Tip, Timbaland, The Neptunes, The Cinematic Orchestra, Felix Laband, The Ecstasy of Saint Theresa, Limp Bizkit and Zero 7.

== Career ==
In 2009, Monexus co-produced Botswana rapper KEB's debut single Botsa Ka Nna with Motswana producer B.R.U.N.O (Brian Thato Mosimane). In 2011, he was the recording engineer for Tuks Senganga's album, Footprints which was released in September, 2012. In the same year, he began the DbS7 mixtape series based on the 7 chakras. Dbs7 Volumes 1 – 4 were released in 2011, Volumes 5 and 6 were released in 2012 and Volume 7 was released on February 21, 2015. He released a Deluxe Version of DbS7 Volume 7 via iTunes on November 27, 2015, and this was received well by music critics.

On August 2, 2015, he released his debut album 7 Of Cups and received good reviews from music critics. Sheer Music signed the album on for a publishing deal. On November 13, 2015, he released a collaborative album with Nigerian rapper Damola titled ‘Warm Plates: Lost Tapes’. On November 19, 2015, he released his second solo album Heat July Cold.

He was also recording engineer for several tracks on Da L.E.S's 2015 album North God.

== Discography ==
DbS7 Volume 1: The Root (2011)

DbS7 Volume 2: The Sacral (2011)

DbS7 Volume 3: Solar Plexus (2011)

DbS7 Volume 4: The Heart (2011)

DbS7 Volume 5: The Throat (2012)

DbS7 Volume 6: Third Eye (2012)

DbS7 Volume 7: The Crown (2015)

7 Of Cups (2015)

Warm Plates: Lost Tapes with Damola (2015)

Heat July Cold (2015)
