= 10 Fingers =

2017 song by AKA and Anatii

Single by Anatii and AKA

from the album Be Careful What You Wish For
- Released: 8 January 2017
- Genre: Hip hop
- Length: 5:15
- Label: Yal Entertainment; Beam Group; Universal Music South Africa
- Songwriter(s): Kiernan Forbes; Nathi Bhongo Mnyango
- Composer(s): Simangaliso Surprise Nzimande
- Lyricist(s): Yanga Ntshakaza
- Producer(s): Anatii; AKA; Dan Joffe

AKA and Anatii singles chronology
"The Saga" (2016)	"10 Fingers" (2017)	"Don't Forget to Pray" (2017)

AKA singles chronology
"The World Is Yours" (2016)	"10 Fingers" (2017)	"Caiphus Song" (2017)

Anatii singles chronology
"Hours" (2016)	"10 Fingers" (2017)	"Don't Forget to Pray" (2017)

Music video
- "10 Fingers (Official music video)"

Official audio
- "10 Fingers"

"10 Fingers" is single by South African singer-songwriter Anatii and rapper AKA from their collaborative studio album Be Careful What You Wish For (2017), it was released on 8 January 2017 through Yal Entertainment and Beam Group under exclusive license from Universal Music South Africa.

== Background ==
AKA asked Anatii to rap in his mother tongue but the singer-songwriter did not have the neck for it, which led AKA to request Yanga Chief to land a hand in writing the song thus writing the chorus in Xhosa for Anatii who never made a record in vernac before.

== Awards and nominations ==
Year	Award ceremony	Category	Recipient/Nominated work	Results	Ref.
2017	South African Music Awards	Best Collaboration	"10 Fingers"	Won	
2017	South African Hip Hop Awards	Song of the Year	"10 Fingers"	Nominated	
