= Altar Ego =

Studio album by AKA
- Released: August 23, 2011
- Recorded: 2009–2011
- Genres: Hip hop; rap
- Length: 59:24
- Languages: English; Setswana; isiZulu
- Labels: Benza Consulting / Vth Season; Showlove Music
- Producers: Tebello "Tibz" Motsoane (also exec.); Kiernan Forbes; pH; Yomelela Mbawu; Beatmaker; IV League

AKA chronology
Altar Ego (2011)	Levels (2014)

Singles from Altar Ego
- 1. "I Want It All" Released: July 28, 2010; 2. "Victory Lap" Released: December 3, 2010; 3. "All I Know" Released: July 11, 2011; 4. "Bang" Released: November 4, 2011

Altar Ego is the debut studio album by South African hip hop recording artist and record producer AKA. The album was released on August 23, 2011, through The Vth Season.

== Promotion ==
AKA kicked off the album launch for Altar Ego at the Alba Lounge, V&A Waterfront in his birth-town Cape Town. He embarked on a nationwide tour in promotion of his album. Nasty C was his opening act during the Durban Leg of his tour.

== Accolades ==
At the 2012 South African Music Awards, Altar Ego won two awards for Male Artist of the Year and Best Street urban Music Album.

Year	Nominee / work	Award	Result
2012	Altar Ego	Best Street Urban Music Album	Won
2012	Altar Ego	Male Artist of the Year	Won

== Track list ==
No.	Title	Writer(s)	Producer(s)	Length
1.	"Altar Ego Intro"	• K. Forbes	IV League	0:29
2.	"Reign" (featuring Buffalo Souljah)	• K. Forbes • T. Ndlovu	IV League	4:38
3.	"Victory Lap"	• K. Forbes	IV League	3:50
4.	"Haters (Skit)"	• L. Gola		1:01
5.	"I Want It All" (featuring Khuli Chana & Prokid)	• K. Forbes • K. Morule • L. Mkhize	IV League	4:17
6.	"All I Know"	• K. Forbes	IV League	4:58
7.	"Mistakes"	• K. Forbes		4:33
8.	"Radio Monate (Skit)"	• Dede Wyt		0:32
9.	"Bang" (featuring Khuli Chana)	• K. Forbes • K. Morule		4:42
10.	"Big 5" (featuring Clu)	• K. Forbes • Clu	IV League	5:29
11.	"BEE (Skit)"	• L. Gola		0:53
12.	"Ladies Is Pimps Too"	• K. Forbes	IV League	4:27
13.	"High School Cool" (Featuring Buks)	• K. Forbes • N. Mazibuko		5:06
14.	"New Year, New Naira (Skit)"	• L. Gola		0:23
15.	"Snakes and Ladders"	• K. Forbes	IV League	4:27
16.	"When I’m Gone"	• K. Forbes	IV League	4:21
17.	"Gola (Skit)"	• L. Gola		0:28
18.	"Victory Lap (Remix)" (Featuring Tumi, HHP & Amu)	• K. Forbes •T. Molekane • J. Tsambo • A. Tshwane	IV League	6:31
Total length:				59:24
