= L-Tido =

South African hip hop musician

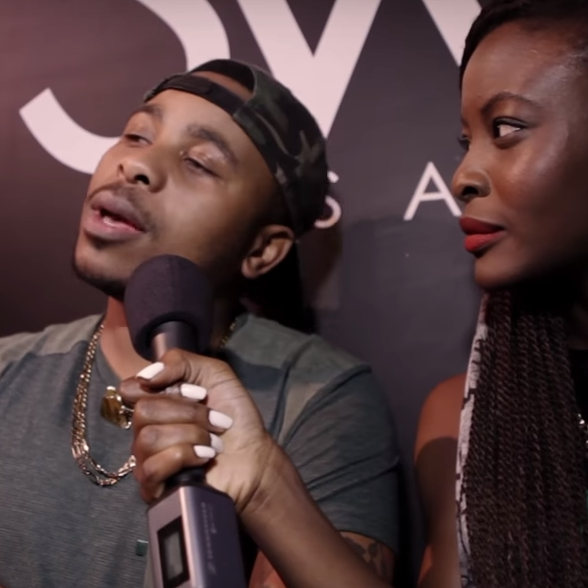
- with Folu Storms on NdaniTV

Background information
- Also known as: L-Tido
- Born: Thato Lloyd Madonsela; 30 January 1985 (age 40); Alexandra, Gauteng, South Africa
- Genres: Hip hop
- Occupations: Rapper; songwriter; record producer; entertainer; performer
- Instrument: Vocals
- Years active: 2009–present
- Website: www.ltido.com

Thato Madonsela (born 30 January 1985), better known by his stage name L-Tido, is a South African hip hop recording artist from Alexandra, Johannesburg. He is best known for being one of the few independent artists in the country to reach commercial success, winning the Best Newcomer in Africa award at the 2010 Channel O Music Video Awards

== Life and early career ==
L-Tido's music career began in 2009 when he self-released, self-marketed and hand-to-hand distributed his mixtape City of Gold. The success of the mixtape lead to award nominations and the winning of Channel O's Most Gifted Newcomer award.

=== 2011: All or Nothing ===
On 30 June 2011, L-Tido independently released his debut album, All or Nothing, which was said to reveal everything about his journey and what it took for this rising star to get to where he is. The album includes collaborations with K.O from Teargas, Nigerian singer Banky W, Tumi from Tumi and the Volume, Da L.E.S of Jozi and Maggz.

The album was well received with several songs topping numerous charts, including Channel O Weekly Charts, MTV Base African Chart, E.tv's Club 808 Chart, French music channel Trace TV's Africa Top 10 Chart; and "We Rollin" becoming the number 2 most played song in the country according to the country's RAM charts (a site which organises, calculates and analyses the most played songs on various local radio stations in the country), a first for a hip hop song in the country. L-tido also became the first hip hop artist to have two songs in the Top 10 of the RAM chart at the same time.

L-Tido directs and conceptualises all of his music videos. He was one of the artists who pioneered the shift in the level of quality of music videos delivered by hip hop artists in the country. Lerato Matsotso of the Daily Sun (South Africa's biggest daily newspaper) noted this movement by saying, "Artists from SA are shifting from just shooting party music videos with the usual pool full of half-naked girls to investing in videos and coming up with great storylines", and identified L-Tido's work as "music videos that will give the international videos a run for their money".

L-Tido also has a Channel O nomination for Best Video, a Metro FM award nomination for "We Rollin" featuring Teargas' KO, and a South African Music Awards nomination for Best Hip Hop album in 2012.

=== 2013: All of Me ===
L-Tido's second album All of Me was released on 8 November 2013, through a licensing partnership between the artist and Electromode Music and Business Solutions and debuted at number 2 on iTunes' South African Hip Hop chart. The artist said the album was "inspired by personal circumstances and situations that my friends and family have gone through in the last year". The album is said to have a current hip hop sound, infused with L-tido's African heritage, with this coming through clearly in the instrumental of his first single "Who You Loving", and the sampling of kwaito artist Doc Shebeleza's "Get Getsa" in his second single, "Steve Kekana".

== Controversy ==
The beef between L-Tido and fellow South African hip hop artist AKA began in 2009 when AKA went on the social network Facebook to publicly disrespect L-Tido, while commenting on a song which features fellow hip hop artists Da L.E.S and Bongani Fassie of thee group Jozi, and Maggz. This sent the South African hip hop scene into a buzz, as artists started to feud. The beef saw both artists recording diss tracks, which marked the end of the public quarrelling between the artists and South Africa's most exciting beef. The beef almost ended Thato's rap career, however in May 2013 the artists put up photos on Instagram of them in the studio together, AKA, L-TIDO in Studio... Beef squashed." They have since released music together.

== Shuga ==
L-Tido was the first South African artist to be part of the campaign to promote the second season of the MTV award-winning youth drama Shuga, commissioned by MTV Networks Africa in association with the MTV Staying Alive Foundation, the Partnership for an HIV-Free Generation (HFG) and the Government of Kenya, by coming together with artists Banky W, Wizkid and Bon-Eye to create the soundtrack for the season. The music video was shot by acclaimed African director Clarence Peters in Kenya.

== Performances and appearances ==
L-Tido has performed several times in the country's major cities and in many small towns, and has opened for Rick Ross, The Game, Slum village, Maino and Usher.

== Discography ==
=== Studio albums ===
List of studio albums, with selected information
Title	Album details	Copies sold
All or Nothing	Released: 31 January 2011; Label: Formats: CD, Digital download	12000
All of Me	Released: 8 November 2013; Label: Electromode; Formats: CD, Digital download	1,600
16	Released: 2018; Label: Self-Release; Formats: CD, Digital download	800
City of Gold	Released: 2008; Label: Self-Release; Formats: CD, Digital download	50,00

=== Mix-tape albums ===
List of mix-tape albums, with selected information
Title	Album details	Certification
City of Gold – Mixtape	Released: 31 January 2011; Label: Formats: CD, Digital download	50,000
