= Be Careful What You Wish For (AKA and Anatii album) =

Studio album by AKA and Anatii
- Released: July 28, 2017
- Recorded: 2017
- Studio: Tea Time Studios, South Africa
- Genre: Hip Hop; R&B; Trap
- Label: BEAM Group; YAL Entertainment; Universal Music South Africa
- Producer: Anatii; AKA; Big Les For Real

AKA chronology
Levels (2014)	Be Careful What You Wish For (2017)	Touch My Blood (2018)

Anatii chronology
Artiifact (2016)	Be Careful What You Wish For (2017)	IYEZA (2018)

Singles from Be Careful What You Wish For
- 1. "10 Fingers" Released: 9 January 2017; 2. "Don't Forget to Pray" Released: 5 May 2017; 3. "Holy Mountain" Released: 13 July 2017

Be Careful What You Wish For is the debut collaborative studio album by South African recording artists AKA and Anatii. It was released on 28 July 2017, by Beam Group and Yel Entertainment, under exclusive licence to Universal Music South Africa.

== Singles ==
"10 Fingers" was released as the lead single on 8 January 2017. The track was produced by Anatii.

"Holy Mountain" and "Don't Forget to Pray" were released as the second and third singles respectively. Both songs received positive response from critics.

== Critical reception ==
The album received positive response from critics. At Yo Mzansi, it received a positive rating of 9/10.

== Track listing ==
Adapted from Apple Music.

Be Careful What You Wish For track listing
No.	Title	Writer(s)	Length
1.	"Bryanston Drive"	Kiernan Jarryd Forbes; Anathi Mnyango	3:52
2.	"10 Fingers"	Forbes; Mnyango	5:15
3.	"Psalm.1000"	Forbes; Mnyango	0:53
4.	"How You Like Me Now!/?"	Forbes; Mnyango	3:34
5.	"Camps Bay 3"	Forbes; Mnyango	4:48
6.	"Holy Mountain"	Forbes; Mnyango	5:00
7.	"Don't Forget to Pray"	Forbes; Mnyango	3:25
8.	"Angelz"	Forbes; Mnyango; BLFR	3:58
9.	"Jesus Plug"	Forbes; Mnyango	4:19
10.	"The Saga"	Forbes; Mnyango; Joffe	4:02

== Release history ==
Region	Date	Format(s)	Label	Ref.
Worldwide	28 July 2017	Digital download; streaming	BEAM Group; YAL Entertainment; Universal Music South Africa; Universal	
Worldwide	29 July 2017	CD	BEAM Group; YAL Entertainment; Universal Music South Africa; Universal	
