= Anatii =

South African musician (born 1993)

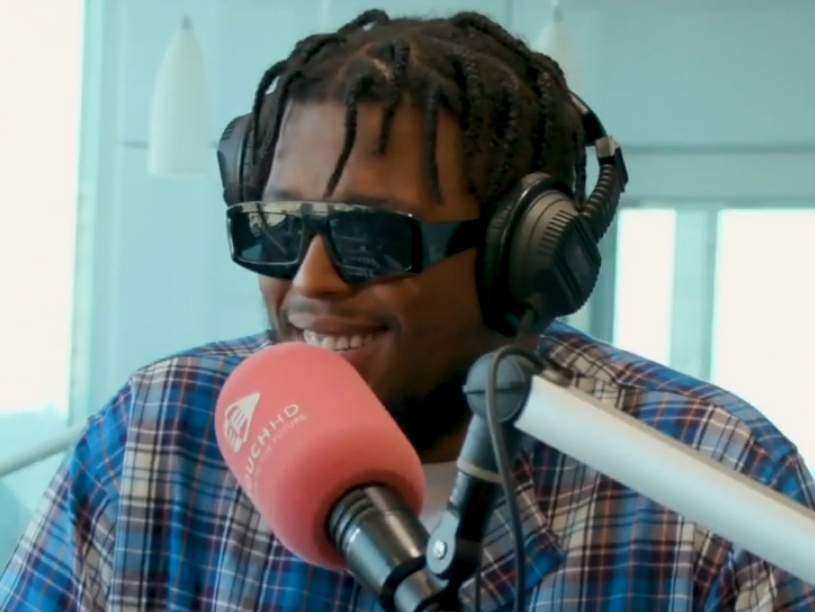
- Anatii in 2018

Background information
- Born: Anathi Bhongo Mnyango; 8 January 1993 (age 33)
- Occupations: Singer; rapper; songwriter; record producer
- Labels: YAL Entertainment; Beam Group

Anathi Bhongo Mnyango (born 8 January 1993), known professionally as Anatii, is a South African rapper, singer, songwriter, and record producer.

== Career ==
Anatii began his professional musical journey at the age of 14 when he received his first major South African placement with L-Tido, for the song "When It Rains". His debut studio album Artiifact was released on 9 September 2016. The album features South African acts AKA, Cassper Nyovest, Nasty C and Uhuru, as well as Nigerian singer Tiwa Savage, Somali-Canadian electronic duo Faarrow and American singer Omarion.

In August 2017, Anatii was selected as The Young Independents influencer of the year October 2017 saw Anatii being selected by GQ South Africa as one of the best-dressed men in South Africa

In November 2017, Anatii, was selected to be a high-level influencer for the LuQuLuQu project set up by the United Nations High Commission for Refugees. The official launch in South Africa for the project took place on 29 November 2017 at the Four Seasons Westcliff hotel in Johannesburg. 2018 has seen Anatii, listed in Forbes Africa's 30 under 30 creatives list.

== Discography ==
=== Studio albums ===
List of studio albums, with selected information
Title	Album details
Artiifact	Released: 9 September 2016; Label: YAL Entertainment; Formats: CD, Digital download
Be Careful What You Wish For (with AKA)	Released: 28 July 2017; Label: YAL Entertainment / Beam Group; Formats: CD, Digital download
Iyeza	Released: 5 October 2018; Label: YAL Entertainment; Formats: CD, Digital download

=== Singles ===
Title	Year	Album
"Thunder Thighs"	2012	Non-album single
"Bananaz" (featuring DJ Khaled)	2014	Non-album single
"Freedom"	2014	Artiifact
"The Saga" (featuring AKA)	2015	Artiifact
"Feeling on Me"	2015	Artiifact
"Hours"	2016	Artiifact
"Jump" (with Cassper Nyovest featuring Nasty C)	2016	Artiifact
"10 Fingers" (with AKA)	2017	Be Careful What You Wish For
"Don't Forget to Pray" (with AKA)	2017	Be Careful What You Wish For
"Thixo Onofefe"	2018	Iyeza
"Ntloni"	2018	Iyeza

=== Production credits ===
2008

- Morale – Ain't No Thing
- L-Tido – When it Rains feat. Anathi Royal

2009

- Lebo M – Baby I Refuse
- Lebo M – Mind Reader
- Lebo M – Sounds Like Thunder

2012

- Anatii – Thunder Thighs

2013

- Chad da Don – Hola feat. Cassper Nyovest

2014

- Anatii – Bananaz feat. DJ Khaled
- Anatii – Freedom
- Cassper Nyovest – Bad One feat. Anatii
- DJ Dimplez – Yaya feat. Dreamteam & Anatii
- DJ Dimplez – Criminal feat. Tumi Molekane, Buffalo Souldier, Reason & Anatii
- DJ Dimplez – Her feat. Cassper Nyovest, Anatii & Maggz
- DJ Dimplez – We Ain't Leaving feat. L-Tido & Anatii
- DJ Dimplez – Way Up feat. JR & Cassper Nyovest
- DJ Milkshake – My Own feat. Cassper Nyovest & Anatii
- Fistaz Mixwell – Alone feat. Riky Rick, Anatii & Chad da Don
- Fistaz Mixwell – No Filter feat. Anatii, Big Nuz, Moneoa, MKW & Thebe
- HHP – Toto and Gogo (Don't Forget) feat. Anatii

2015

- DJ Speedsta – Special Somebody feat. Cassper Nyovest, Riky Rick & Anatii
- Cassper Nyovest – Doc Shebeleza Remix feat. Talib Kweli
- Anatii – The Saga feat. AKA
- Cassper Nyovest – Ghetto feat. DJ Drama & Anatii
- Cassper Nyovest – 428 to LA feat. Casey Veggies
- Cassper Nyovest – Single for the Night feat. Wizkid
- Anatii – Feeling on Me
- Dreamteam – Shandis feat. Anatii
- Cassper Nyovest – Tse Tswembu Tse Blind feat. DJ Drama
- Riky Rick – Fuseg feat. Cassper Nyovest & Anatii
- Danny K – For The Girls feat. Anatii (2015)
- Chad – Sorry Mom I'm Moving Out feat. Anatii

2016

- Anatii & Cassper Nyovest – Jump feat. Nasty C
- Jay Spitter – Amalobolo feat. Anatii

2017

- AKA & Anatii – 10 Fingers
- Portia Monique & Anatii – Everywhere You Go
- AKA & Anatii – Don't Forget to Pray
- Cassper Nyovest – Destiny feat. Goapele
- Ma nala – Soze
- Omarion – Open Up

2018

- Anatii – Thixo Onofefe
- Seyi Shay – The Vibe feat. Anatii, DJ Tira, Slimcase & Danger
- AKA – Me & You
- AKA – Daddy Issues II
- DJ Dimplez – Vacation feat. Anatii & Da L.E.S

=== Songwriter credits ===
2019

- "MOOD 4 EVA" – Beyoncé, Jay-Z & Childish Gambino
- "Brown Skin Girl" feat. Blue Ivy Carter – Beyoncé, SAINt JHN & Wizkid

== Awards and nominations ==
Year	Award ceremony	Category	Results	Ref.
2015	SAHHA	Best Music Video for "The Saga" ft. AKA	Won	
2015	SAHHA	Best Collaboration for The Saga ft. AKA	Won	
2017		Young Independent Influencer of the Year		
2017	GQ South Africa	Best Dressed Men		
2017	SAHHA	Best Collaboration for 10 Fingers by AKA & Anatii		
2018	Forbes Africa	30 under 30 Creatives		
2018	25th South African Music Awards	Male Artist of the Year	Nominated	
2019	STMA	The Ashford & Simpson Songwriter's Award for Brown Skin Girl		
