= Congratulate (song) =

Single by AKA

from the album Levels
- Released: 28 February 2014
- Recorded: 2013
- Genre: Hip hop
- Length: 3:45
- Label: Vth Season
- Songwriters: Kiernan Forbes; T. Lehutso; JR
- Producer: Tazzy

AKA singles chronology
"Kontrol" (2013)	"Congratulate" (2014)	"Run Jozi (Godly)" (2014)

"Congratulate" is a song by South African rapper AKA. It was released as the third single from his second studio album, Levels (2014). The song was sent to radio stations across South Africa in March 2014, and debuted at number one on Metro FM, 5FM and YFM. Moreover, it peaked at number two on South Africa's official music chart. "Congratulate" was produced by Tazzy, a member of the funk band Muzart.

== Composition and meaning ==
"Congratulate" samples Harrison Crump's "Ride". An electric piano chord was played simultaneously with the sample. Three verses and a hook comprise the song. Throughout the song, the bassline changes. Singer JR contributed background vocals to the track. In "Congratulate", AKA raps about his journey to success. In early 2014, he told SABC he recorded "Congratulate" to relate with ordinary people and that the song is about one celebrating the positive milestones in their lives. In May 2015, "Congratulate" was certified Gold by the Recording Industry of South Africa.

== Cover art and music video ==
AKA shared the artwork for "Congratulate" prior to releasing it. He posted the cover art on Twitter and tagged it with the hash-tag "#AKACongratulate". On 1 May 2014, the accompanying music video for the song was released and uploaded to YouTube at a total length of 4 minutes and 2 seconds.

== Accolades ==
The music video for "Congratulate" won Most Gifted Hip-hop and was nominated for Most Gifted Southern and Most Gifted Video of the Year at the 2014 Channel O Music Video Awards.

== Charts ==
Chart (2013)	Peak position
South Africa (EMA)	2
