= Tweezy =

South African rapper and producer (born 1992)

- Also known as: Tweezy Da Dreema; Tweezus
- Born: Tumelo Thandokuhle Mathebula; 24 October 1992 (age 33); Durban, KwaZulu-Natal, South Africa
- Origin: Johannesburg, Gauteng, South Africa
- Genres: Hip hop
- Occupations: Record producer; Rapper
- Instruments: FL Studio; Vocals
- Years active: 2011–present
- Labels: Dreamteam SA (former); Ambitiouz Ent (current)

Tumelo Thandokuhle Mathebula (born 24 October 1992), professionally known as Tweezy, is a South African record producer and rapper from Johannesburg, South Africa.

== Early life and career ==
Tumelo Mathebula moved to Johannesburg in the Gauteng Province after the passing of his parents at the age of 6. He was introduced to a music making software called FL Studio in grade 10 which he thought was a "music making game", he later discovered that it was in fact a music making software.

He joined a music group called Ghetto Prophecy that consisted of eight members. The group produced a song called "Oh My", which ranked number 16 on the top 40 songs of YFM and was played frequently on Metro FM as well as 5FM in 2011. The group disbanded because of the lack of funding, which is when Tweezy decided to venture into the music industry as a producer.

In 2014 Tweezy was nominated for producer of the year at the SA Hip Hop Awards 2014. He was nominated again the following year for the same award and won producer of the year at the SA Hip Hop Award 2015. He was named producer of the year by Hype magazine, a local hip hop magazine. He released his first solo single titled "Ambitions" which charted number two on YFM's Urban Top 40. He later on released a remix for the single which features South Africa rapper Khuli Chana, Nigerian artist Ice Prince and singer-songwriter Victoria Kimani

== Singles ==
=== As lead artist ===
List of singles as lead artist, with chart positions and certifications, showing year released and album name
Title	Year	Peak chart position (EMA)	Certification	Album
"Ambitions"	2016	—		Non-album single
"Ambitions (remix)" (featuring Khuli Chana, Victoria Kimani & Ice Prince)	2016	—		Non-album single
"Jumanji"	2017	—		Non-album single
"Fuego"	2017	—		Non-album single
"Basetsana"	2018	—		Non-album single
"—" denotes a recording that did not chart.

== Singles produced ==
List of singles produced, with selected chart positions and certifications, showing year released and album name
Title	Year	Peak chart positions	Certification	Album
Title	Year	South Africa (EMA)	Certification	Album
"Celebration" (DJ Speedsta featuring Bucie & KiD X)	2016	—		The Guy (016 To The World)
"Ameni" (Miss Pru DJ featuring Fifi Cooper, Emtee, B3nchMarQ, A-Reece, Saudi and Sjava)	2016	—		Non-album single
"Mbongo-Zaka" (Rouge featuring Moozlie)	2016	—		The New Era Sessions
"Sidlukotini" (Riky Rick)	2016	—		Non-album single
"iVibe" (Chad)	2016	—		The Book of Chad
"Big Dreams" (Stogie T)	2016	—		Stogie T
"Diamond Walk" (Stogie T)	2016	—		Stogie T
"Mercy" (DJ Sliqe featuring Riky Rick, Reason, Kwesta and Thaiwanda)	2016	—		Injayam Vol. 1
"All On Me" (B3nchMarQ)	2016	—		Non-album single
"Bay 2" (DJ Sliqe featuring AKA, Yanga and JR)	2016	—		Injayam Vol. 1
"Jumanji" (Tweezy)	2017	—		
"Mercy" (DJ Sliqe featuring Riky Rick, Reason, Kwesta, ThaiWanda)	2017			Non-album single
"On It" (DJ Sliqe featuring Shekhinah)	2017	—		Injayam Vol. 1
"No Pressure" (Neo)	2017	—		Non-album singles
"Fuego" (Tweezy)	2017	—		Non-album singles
"New School Bully" (Kid Tini)	2017	—		Non-album singles
"Corner Store" (Emtee)	—			Manando
"King" (Nasty C featuring A$AP Ferg)	2018	—		Strings And Bling
"Amademoni" (featuring Cassper Nyovest)	2020	_		Non-album singles
"—" denotes a recording that did not chart or was not released in that territory.

== Awards and nominations ==
Year	Award Ceremony	Prize	Work/Recipient	Result
2021	27th South African Music Awards	Best Engineered Album of the Year	The Second Coming by Kid Tini – James Smals, Kitie, Ron Epidemic & Tweezy	Nominated
2014	South African Hip Hop Awards 2014	Producer of the Year	Himself	Nominated
2015	South African Hip Hop Awards 2015	Producer of the Year	Himself	Won
2016	South African Hip Hop Awards 2016	Producer of the Year	Himself	Won
2016	South African Hip Hop Awards 2016	Best Remix	Ambitions (Remix featuring Khuli Chana, Victoria Kimani & Ice Prince)	Nominated
2017	AFRIMMA Awards 2017	Music Producer of The Year	Himself	Nominated
