= Don't Forget to Pray =

2017 song by Anatii and AKA

Single by Anatii and AKA

from the album Be Careful What You Wish For
- Language: Xhosa
- Released: 2 May 2017
- Genre: Hip hop
- Length: 3:25
- Label: Yal Entertainment; Beam Group; Universal Music South Africa
- Composers: Simangaliso Surprise Nzimande; Mpilo Shabangu
- Lyricists: Kiernan Forbes; Anathi Bhongo Mnyango
- Producers: Anathi Bhongo Mnyango; Kiernan Forbes; Dan Joffe

AKA and Anatii singles chronology
"10 Fingers" (2017)	"Don't Forget to Pray" (2017)	"Holy Mountain" (2017)

AKA singles chronology
"Caiphus Song" (2017)	"Don't Forget to Pray" (2017)	"Kolole (Coke Studio Africa)" (2017)

Anatii singles chronology
"10 Fingers" (2017)	"Don't Forget to Pray" (2017)	"Thixo Onofefe" (2017)

Music video
- "Don't Forget to Pray (Official music video)"

Official audio
- "Don't Forget to Pray"

Audio sample
- A 29-seconds sample of "Don't Forget to Pray": file; help

"Don't Forget to Pray" is a single of South African singer-songwriter and record producer Anatii and rapper AKA from their collaborative studio album Be Careful What You Wish For (2017), it was released 2 May 2017 through Yal Entertainment and Vth Season under exclusive license from Universal Music South Africa. The single premiered on Beats1 in the United States, and was praised by the Hot 97 host Ebro Darden.

== Music video ==
Executive produced by AKA and directed by Alessio Bettocchi, the visuals to "Don't Forget to Pray" premiered on Channel O on the 1st of September 2017, and was published on YouTube on 5 September 2017. As of November 2023 the music video is sitting on 2,7 million views on YouTube.

== Awards and nominations ==
Awards and nominations for "Don't Forget to Pray"
Year	Award ceremony	Category	Recipient/Nominated work	Results	Ref.
2017	South African Hip Hop Awards	Song of the Year	"Don't Forget to Pray"	Nominated	
2018	South African Music Awards	Record of the Year	"Don't Forget to Pray"	Nominated	
