= Lamiez Holworthy =

South African DJ, television personality and radio presenter

- Born: Lamiez Mischa Miriam Holworthy; 12 June 1992 (age 33); Eersterust, South Africa
- Education: Laudium Secondary School; Boston Media House
- Occupations: DJ; Television presenter; Radio personality; Businesswoman; Philanthropist; Record producer
- Years active: 2010–present
- Spouse: Khuli Chana (m. 2019)
- Children: 1
- Father: Sello Chicco Twala
- Musical career
- Origin: Gauteng, South Africa
- Genres: Hip hop, House, Amapiano
- Instruments: Turntable; DAW; Sampler

Lamiez Mischa Miriam Holworthy-Morule (née Holworthy; born 12 June 1992), is a South African DJ, television personality, radio presenter, record producer, businesswoman and philanthropist. She is best known for hosting the SABC 1 music show, Live AMP.

== Early life and education ==
Holworthy was born on 12 June 1992 in Eersterust to record producer Chicco Twala and Imelda Klow. When she was 11-years old her mother married Enver Holworthy who then adopted her and gave her his surname. She is of South African Indian, Coloured, and Tsonga heritage.

She grew up in Laudium and attended Andrew Anthony Primary, then, Sunnyside Primary and later on, Kwaggasrand Primary. She also attended Pro Arte Alphen Park from grade 8 to 9. In 2009, she matriculated from Laudium Secondary School, and then went on to study media at Boston Media House in 2012.

== Career ==
Lamiez started her career as an underground disc jockey while learning and mastering the art of mixing in 2010. She started her career in high school by guest presenting on a show called KMTV on Soweto TV and later emerged as the host for the South African lifestyle show Living The Dream which aired on Tshwane TV. She has revealed that she almost left the entertainment industry after an accident during her audition where her car was vandalized, and her deejay equipment was stolen. After seven years, she landed her biggest role on SABC 1’s Live Amp.

In April 2021, she became the co-host of the Metro FM dance show, Penthouse Session alongside South African DJ and presenter Lulo Café. In July 2021, she was the presenter of the 27th South African Music Awards.

=== Music ===
In August 2021, she released her debut single, "Sthokoze", which features the Lowkeys and Drip Gogo. Later that year, she was nominated for Best Amapiano Female DJ Act at the South African Amapiano Awards.

=== Philanthropy ===
She started her own philanthropic foundation, the Lamiez Holworthy Foundation. The foundation provides aid for orphanages and safe houses for abused, abandoned HIV infected and affected children. The foundation also focusses on funding students from disadvantaged backgrounds with study materials, financial aid and sponsors.

In October 2021, she was honoured at the South African Heroines Awards for her philanthropic work.

== Personal life ==
She met rapper Khuli Chana in August 2018 and the couple got married in November 2019. They welcomed their first child Leano-Laone Zion Morule on 9 March 2023.

== Awards and nominations ==
Year	Award ceremony	Prize	Result
2021	SA Amapiano Music Awards	Best Amapiano Female DJ Act	Nominated
2022	Basadi in Music Awards	DJ of the Year	Won
