= North God (album) =

Studio album by Da L.E.S
- Released: November 27, 2015
- Recorded: 2014–2015
- Genre: Hip hop, rap
- Length: 41:16
- Label: Fresh 2 Def Records; Sony Music Entertainment Africa
- Producer: Da L.E.S (also exec.); V.A.M. (also exec.); Claudio Manjate; DJ Dimplez; Riky Rick

Da L.E.S chronology
Mandela Money (2014)	North God (2015)	Diamond in Africa (2016)

Singles from North God
- 1. "P.A.I.D" Released: June 13, 2015; 2. "Summer Time" Released: September 25, 2015; 3. "Bank Roll" Released: October 9, 2015; 4. "6AM" Released: November 24, 2015; 5. "Real Stuff" Released: April 01, 2016

North God is the third studio album by South African American hip hop recording artist Da L.E.S, released on November 27, 2015, through Fresh 2 Def Records and Sony Music Entertainment Africa.

== Background ==
Recording sessions for the album started in 2014 after the release of his sophomore album Mandela Money. Da L.E.S has reportedly entered the studio with South African DJ Dimplez, and rappers Ma-E and Kid X from the Cashtime Life hip hop collective.

== Promotion ==
The album was made available for pre-order on iTunes on November 13, 2015 and released officially on November 27, 2015.

On December 3, 2015, Da L.E.S launched an album release party and concert at Melrose Arch in Johannesburg. He partnered with iTunes to ensure that the first 150 people to pre-order his album will get free access to the event.

The North God Album Launch Concert was sponsored by Cîroc (for which he is a South African Ambassador), V.A.M. and Sony Music Entertainment Africa. The supporting acts for the album launch concert included AKA, Riky Rick, Tamara Dey, Tumi, Sphum and DJ Milkshake as well as Ma-E, Maggz, Kid X and Nomuzi aka Moozlie.

== Singles ==
The first official single off the album, titled "P.A.I.D", was released on June 13, 2015, and contains features from frequent collaborators, fellow South African hip hop recording artist AKA and Nigerian dance-hall singer Burna Boy.

The second official single, titled "Summer Time" was released on September 25, 2015, and contains features and production from fellow South African hip hop record producer, Riky Rick.

DJ Milkshake's single "Bank Roll" which was released on October 9, 2015, and features vocals from Da L.E.S and Kid X, will serve as a single on the album.

== Track listing ==
No.	Title	Writer(s)	Producer(s)	Length
1.	"Keys 2 the City" (featuring Tamara Dey)	Tamara Dey; Leslie Mampe; Claudio Manjate; Kevin Marrengule	Claudio "Emblazon" Manjate	03:18
2.	"Freak Nasty"	L. Mampe; C. Manjate	V.A.M	03:01
3.	"P.A.I.D" (featuring AKA and Burna Boy)	C. Manjate; L. Mampe; K. Marrengule; Kiernan Forbes; Damini Ogulu; R. Nair	V.A.M	03:40
4.	"Summer Time" (featuring Riky Rick)	L. Mampe; C. Manjate; Rikhado Makhado	V.A.M	03:01
5.	"6AM" (featuring Ma-E and Moozlie)	L. Mampe; C. Manjate; Nomuzi Mabena; Eezy Hanabe	V.A.M	03:14
6.	"Real Stuff" (featuring AKA and Maggz)	L. Mampe; K. Forbes; Gift Magubane; C. Manjate	V.A.M	05:12
7.	"Bank Roll" (featuring DJ Milkshake and Kid X)	L. Mampe; C. Manjate; Bonginkosi Mahlangu; Kagiso Mabelane	V.A.M	03:28
8.	"Zone" (Freestyle)	C. Manjate; L. Mampe	V.A.M	03:05
9.	"Church Bells" (featuring Pipez)	L. Mampe; C. Manjate; Eric de Sousa	V.A.M	03:59
10.	"Mood" (featuring Tumi and Sphum)	C. Manjate; L. Mampe; Tumi Molekane; Sphum Radebe	V.A.M	02:50
11.	"Keep It All Trill"	L. Mampe; C. Manjate	V.A.M	03:21
12.	"Made It (Outro)"	C. Manjate; L. Mampe; K. Marrengule	Claudio Manjate	03:07
Total length:				41:16
