= 20Fifi =

20FIFI

Studio album by Fifi Cooper
- Released: November 13, 2015
- Recorded: 2013–2015
- Genres: Hip hop; R&B; Motswako
- Length: 58:00
- Label: Ambitiouz Entertainment
- Producer: Various

Fifi Cooper chronology
| 20FIFI (2015) | Take Me Back (2018) |

20FIFI is the debut studio album of South African recording artist Fifi Cooper. It was released on 13 November 2015 under Ambitiouz Entertainment.

== Track listing ==
| No. | Title | Length |
|---|---|---|
| 1. | "20Fifi" | 4:07 |
| 2. | "Bafitlhile" | 3:23 |
| 3. | "Truth or Dare" | 4:17 |
| 4. | "Kisses" (featuring AB Crazy) | 3:24 |
| 5. | "Good Girl Down" | 3:15 |
| 6. | "Ko Ke Blomang Teng" | 3:03 |
| 7. | "Puntsununu" (featuring JR & Kwesta) | 5:19 |
| 8. | "Kuze Kuse" (featuring Emtee) | 4:05 |
| 9. | "Monate C" | 3:59 |
| 10. | "Thupa" | 2:47 |
| 11. | "Sad Song" | 4:59 |
| 12. | "Love Letter" | 3:14 |
| 13. | "Sebokoladi" | 4:20 |
| 14. | "Tsela" | 3:33 |
| 15. | "Ngeke" (featuring Emtee) | 4:28 |
| Total length: | | 58:00 |

== Personnel ==
Credits for 20Fifi are adapted from AllMusic.

- AB Crazy - Featured Artist
- Emtee - Featured Artist, Primary Artist
- Fifi Cooper - Primary Artist
- Jr - Featured Artist
- Kgosi Mahumapelo gComposer
- Kwesta - Featured Artist
- Lerothodi Moagi - Composer
- Mnqobi Nxumalo - Composer
- Motlana Mofokeng - Composer
- Mthembeni Ndevu - Composer
- Orapeleng Moreri - Composer
- Orapeloeng Moreri - Composer
- Refilwe Boingotlo Mooketsi - Composer
- Ronald Baloyi - Composer
- Senzo Vilakazi - Composer
- Tabure Thabo Bogopa - Composer
- Tebogo Moropa - Composer
- Thando Mathebula - Composer
- Tumelo Dibakwane - Composer
- Tumelo Thandokuhle Mathebula - Composer
- Wright Ngubeni - Composer

== Accolades ==
One single from 20Fifi has been certified gold. Kuze Kuse, which featured former label mate Emtee. The video of Kuze Kuse reached 1 million views on YouTube making Fifi Cooper the first South African female rapper to achieve this. 20Fifi is currently the best selling female rap album in South Africa, the only female rap album to appear on iTunes top 200 hip hop albums of all time.

== Awards and nominations ==
20FIFI won two category awards at the 15th Metro FM Music Awards.

| Year | Award ceremony | Prize | Result | Ref |
|---|---|---|---|---|
| 2015 | 15th Metro FM Music Awards | Best Female Album | Won | |
| 2015 | 15th Metro FM Music Awards | Best Produced Album | Won | |

== Release history ==
| Region | Date | Format | Label | Ref |
|---|---|---|---|---|
| South Africa | November 13, 2015 | CD, digital download | Ambitiouz Entertainment | |
