= Mandela Money =

Studio album by Da L.E.S
- Released: July 4, 2014
- Recorded: 2013–2014
- Studio: Fresh 2 Def Production Studio
- Genre: Hip hop; crunk; kwaito
- Length: 63:25
- Language: English
- Label: Fresh 2 Def Productions; Sony Music Entertainment Africa
- Producer: Da L.E.S (also exec.); Biz Boy

Da L.E.S chronology
Fresh 2 Def (2008)	Mandela Money (2014)	North God (2015)

Singles from Mandela Money
- 1. "Heaven" Released: May 23, 2013; 2. "Fire" Released: November 22, 2013; 3. "Dice" Released: September 15, 2014

Mandela Money is the second studio album by South African American hip hop recording artist and record producer Da L.E.S, released on July 4, 2014. It is his first album to be released by his record company Fresh 2 Def Productions, along with a distribution deal through Sony Music Entertainment Africa.

== Background ==
Recording sessions for the album began after the release of the commercially successful single, titled "Heaven" which features guest verses from fellow South African hip hop recording artists AKA and Maggz. Da L.E.S used the R1 million cash prize that he won from Tropika in 2013 to build his own record and publishing company Fresh 2 Def Productions. Da L.E.S stated that the album was inspired by former South African President Nelson Mandela, citing his inspiration to "Reach higher heights in order to have my face on money one day”. He made the album to encourage young Africans to strive for success.

== Promotion ==
Da L.E.S embarked on a Mandela Money tour in South Africa, to promote the release of his sophomore studio album, his first solo release in over 5 years since Fresh 2 Def in 2008.

== Track listing ==
No.	Title	Writer(s)	Producer	Length
1.	"Intro"	Nelson Rolihlahla Mandela; Leslie Mampe		02:23
2.	"26 July"	Leslie Mampe; Ndombe Evaristo Eduardo; Andre Nathan Brown		03:17
3.	"Ballin'"	Leslie Mampe; Claudio Manjate; Kevin Marrengule	V.A.M	03:48
4.	"Fire"	Leslie Mampe; Bhekumuzi Maphanga		03:14
5.	"Heaven" (featuring AKA and Maggz)	Leslie Mampe; Bhekumuzi Maphanga; Kiernan Forbes; Gift Magubane	Biz Boy	03:46
6.	"No Kidding" (featuring Mario Ogle)	Mario Ogle; Leslie Mampe		04:19
7.	"Already Know" (featuring Sphum)	Leslie Mampe; Bhekumuzi Maphanga; Sphum Radebe		04:24
8.	"Dice"	Leslie Mampe; Ndombe Evaristo Eduardo; Andre Nathan Brown		03:14
9.	"Gold" (featuring Sphum)	Leslie Mampe; Claudio Manjate; Kevin Marrengule; Sphum Radebe		03:28
10.	"Let Me Know" (featuring Sphum and Junior Prez)	Leslie Mampe; Karabo Matjwadi; Franklin van Staden		04:21
11.	"Dirty Politician" (featuring Junior Prez and AKA)	Leslie Mampe; Ndombe Evaristo Eduardo; Andre Nathan Brown; Kiernan Forbes; Franklin van Staden		04:17
12.	"I Swear" (featuring Ice Prince)	Leslie Mampe; Claudio Manjate; Kevin Marrengule; Panshak Zamani		03:54
13.	"Faded" (featuring Pipez)	Leslie Mampe; Claudio Manjate; Kevin Marrengule; Eric de Sousa		03:43
14.	"D.U.F.E. - Deliver Us From Evil" (featuring Daniel Buys)	Daniel Buys; Leslie Mampe; Mpho Pholo		04:14
15.	"Outro"	Prince Nyembe		03:24
16.	"Patron Break"	Leslie Mampe; Kiernan Forbes; Franklin van Staden		03:16
17.	"Bussit" (featuring Los Rakas)	Leslie Mampe; Raka Rich; Raka Dun		04:23
Total length:				63:25
