= Dreamwork (song) =

2016 single by AKA

Single by AKA featuring Yanga
- Released: 22 April 2016
- Genre: Hip hop; Rap
- Length: 4:41
- Label: SME Africa (on behalf of Vth Season)
- Songwriter(s): Kiernan Forbes; Yanga Ntshakaza
- Producer(s): KJ Conteh

AKA singles chronology
"Make me Sing" (2016)	"Dreamwork" (2016)	"One Time" (2016)

Yanga singles chronology
"Vesu Yeke" (2016)	"Dreamwork" (2016)	"Neighborhood Genius" (2017)

Music video
- "Dreamwork (Official video)" on YouTube

Animated video
- "Dreamwork (Animated pseudo video)" on YouTube

Official audio
- "Dreamwork (Official audio)" on YouTube

Behind the Scenes
- "Dreamwork (Before the Scenes)" on YouTube

"Dreamwork" is a single by South African rapper AKA and features guest appearance from Yanga with production from Los Angeles based producer KJ Conteh. The single was released on 22 April 2016 through Vth Season under exclusive license from SME Africa.

In 2019, the single hit over 1,700,000 units, and over 2,000,000 stream and was certified 5× Diamond making the rapper the first South African artist to reach the Diamond status. The very same night at a private dinner in Bryanston, Johannesburg it was announced that his single "One Time" was also certified Diamond, and "Caiphus song" and "The World Is Yours" (from a Platinum studio album Touch My Blood) were certified 8× Platinum, the rapper celebrated his success with a tweet posing with the plaques.

== Awards and nominations ==
Year	Award ceremony	Category	Results	Ref.
2016	South African Hip Hop Awards	Best Collabo	Nominated	

== Certification and sales ==
Region	Certification	Certified units/sales
South Africa (RISA)	5× Diamond	1,700,000
