= The Book of Chad =

Studio album by Chad
- Released: 16 April 2016
- Recorded: 2013–2016
- Genre: Hip hop; rap; Motswako
- Length: 76:24
- Label: DCM Entertainment
- Producer: Bonafide Billi (exec.); Chad da Don; Anatii; Locnville; Brian Soko; Tweezy

Chad chronology
| The Book of Chad (2016) | Another Chapter: Free Chad (TBA) |

Singles from The Book of Chad
- 1. "EFT" Released: 27 July 2015; 2. "Sorry Mom I'm Moving Out" Released: 23 October 2015; 3. "The Other Side" Released: 20 January 2016; 4. "Chad is Better" Released: 14 April 2016

The Book of Chad is the debut studio album by South African hip hop record producer and rapper Chad da Don. The album was released on 16 April 2016 on his record label DCM Entertainment. The album debuted and peaked at No. 1 on the Hip Hop / Rap chart the South African iTunes Store, and was made available for streaming on Apple Music and Tidal.

The album was preceded by the single "EFT" which was produced by and features award-winning record producer Brian Soko, and the controversial single "Chad is Better", a diss-track which takes shots at his former label-boss Cassper Nyovest.

== Track listing ==
| No. | Title | Writer(s) | Producer(s) | Length |
|---|---|---|---|---|
| 1. | "Paranoia" (featuring Janine V) | Donovan Mansoor; Janine van der Byl; Kabelo Togoe; Choolwe Dumisani Munyathi | Bonafide Billi | 04:01 |
| 2. | "Down That Road" | D. Mansoor; Choolwe Dumisani Munyathi; Ashley Valentine | | 03:55 |
| 3. | "Books by the Covers" | D. Mansoor; Ntokozo Mazibuko | Buks | 04:17 |
| 4. | "Nowhere to Go" (featuring Bonafide Billi) | D. Mansoor; Kabelo Togoe | | 03:44 |
| 5. | "The Child That Survived" (featuring Refi Sings) | D. Mansoor; Refiloe Morake; Kabelo Togoe; Xhanti Nonpunga | | 03:46 |
| 6. | "Moments to Spare" (featuring JJ Sine) | D. Mansoor; Jacques Janse van Rensburg | | 03:29 |
| 7. | "Can't Do It Like Us" (featuring Bonafide Billi) | D. Mansoor; K. Togoe | Bonafide Billi | 03:24 |
| 8. | "Not That Difficult" | D. Mansoor; K. Togoe | | 03:30 |
| 9. | "Chad is Better" | D. Mansoor; K. Togoe | Tweezy | 03:40 |
| 10. | "Time to Go" (featuring Bonafide Billi) | D. Mansoor; K. Togoe | | 03:26 |
| 11. | "Vibe" | D. Mansoor; Tumelo Thandokuhle Mathebula; Xhanti Nonpunga; K. Togoe | Tweezy | 03:49 |
| 12. | "EFT" (featuring Brian Soko) | B. Soko; D. Mansoor | Brian Soko | 03:27 |
| 13. | "Sorry Mom I'm Moving Out" (featuring Anatii) | D. Mansoor; Anathi Mnyango; Ashley Valentine | Anatii | 03:32 |
| 14. | "Panties to the Side" (featuring Locnville) | D. Mansoor; Brian Chaplin; Andrew Chaplin; K. Togoe | LCNVL | 04:00 |
| 15. | "Greatest" | D. Mansoor; K. Togoe; Xhanti Nonpunga; Ashley Valentine |
| 16. | "Irie" (featuring Exe and Bonafide Billi) | D. Mansoor; K. Togoe; Xhanti Nonpunga | | 03:58 |
| 17. | "Who You With" (featuring Exe) | D. Mansoor; K. Togoe; Xhanti Nonpunga | | 03:36 |
| 18. | "The Other Side" (featuring Nasty C) | D. Mansoor; D. Ngcobo; Ashley Valentine | | 03:40 |
| 19. | "Bank Job" (featuring Exe) | D. Mansoor; Xhanti Nonpunga; Ashley Valentine | | 04:00 |
| 20. | "Sleep with the Dogs" | D. Mansoor; X. Nonpunga; T. Mathebula |
| 21. | "Come On" (featuring Kyle Deutsch) | D. Mansoor; K. Deutschmann; Yuvir Pillay | | 02:58 |
| 22. | "Outro" | D. Mansoor | Chad da Don | 00:36 |
| Total length: | | | | 76:24 |
