= Tumi and the Volume (album) =

Studio album by Tumi and the Volume
- Released: 2006
- Recorded: 2005
- Genre: Jazz rap, hip hop, jazz
- Length: 67:45
- Label: District Six Records, Calabash Music
- Producer: Tumi and the Volume

Professional ratings
Review scores
Source	Rating
Music Industry Online	
Eye Weekly	
Johannesburg Live	
Student Village	

Tumi and the Volume, released in December 2005, is the second album from Tumi and the Volume. It is their first studio album.

== Track listing ==
1. "Ellof – 17:45"
2. "Floor"
3. "Bus Stop Confessions"
4. "Johnny Dyani"
5. "What It's All About"
6. "Smile, you on camera" (featuring Ft. Fifi)
7. "Afrique" (prod. by moO, featured in FIFA 08)
8. "The Story Behind the Pain"
9. "Signs"
10. "Oslo"
11. "Basement"
12. "Ladies and Gentlemen"
13. "Learning"
14. "In a Minute" (featuring Ft. Fifi)
15. "Bergman's Theory"
16. "Sticks and Stones"
17. "These Women"

== Credits ==
Producer(s): Tumi and the Volume
