= One Time (AKA song) =

2016 single by AKA

Single by AKA
- Released: 25 April 2016
- Genre: Hip hop; rap
- Length: 4:54
- Label: SME Africa (on behalf of Vth Season)
- Songwriter: Kiernan Forbes
- Producers: Kiernan Forbes; Mpilo Shabangu

AKA singles chronology
"Dreamwork" (2016)	"One Time" (2016)	"The World Is Yours" (2016)

Music video
- "One Time (Official video)" on YouTube

Official audio
- "One Time (Official audio)" on YouTube

"One Time" is a non-album single by South African rapper and songwriter AKA, released on 25 April 2016 through Vth Season with exclusive license from SME Africa. The single was certified Diamond in South Africa in late 2019, thus marked AKA the inaugural South African hip hop artist to score the certificate.

In 2019. "Dreamwork" hit 1,700,000 units and over 2,000,000 streams and was certified 5× Diamond, making the rapper the first South African artist to reach the Diamond status. The very same night at a private dinner in Bryanston, Johannesburg it was announced that "One Time" was also certified Diamond, and "Caiphus song" and "The World Is Yours" (from a Platinum studio album Touch My Blood) were certified 8× Platinum, Forbes celebrated the success with a tweet posing with the plaques.

== Certification ==
Region	Certification
South Africa (RISA)	Diamond
