= Iyeza =

IYEZA

Studio album by Anatii
- Released: 5 October 2018
- Recorded: 2018
- Studio: Tea Time Studios, South Africa; Durban, South Africa; East London, South Africa; The Room, Los Angeles, CA, USA
- Genre: World Music
- Length: 34 Minutes
- Language: isiXhosa; English
- Label: YAL Entertainment
- Producer: Anatii (exec.); Big Les For Real

Singles from IYEZA
- 1. "Thixo Onofefe" Released: 8 January 2018; 2. "Ntloni" Released: 5 October 2018

Iyeza (stylized as IYEZA) is the second solo studio album by South African record producer and musician Anatii. The album was released on 5 October 2018 by his record label YAL Entertainment.

Anatii has released three music videos for the album.

"I am not making music for anyone but myself. It is a therapeutic process. I felt that this is what helped me get through those darkest times,”

== Promotion ==
In promotion of his album release, Anatii commenced celebrations with an album listening session at The Vault in Marshalltown, Johannesburg. At the listening session, Anatii revealed the album’s artwork which was created by Nika Mtwana

== Track listing ==
No.	Title	Writer(s)	Producer(s)	Length
1.	"Wena"	Anathi Mnyango; Tshepo Moloi	Anatii	04:20
2.	"Ngozi"	Anathi Mnyango	Anatii	03:49
3.	"Ehlathini"	Anathi Mnyango; Surprise Ndimande; Tshepo Moloi; Emmanuel Simeli; Oberon Moolman	Anatii	03:14
4.	"Ndaweni"	Anathi Mnyango; Surprise Ndimande; Tshepo Moloi; Bongiwe Mapanza	Anatii	03:34
5.	"Zion (Interlude)"	Anathi Mnyango; Surprise Ndimande	Anatii	01:05
6.	"Ntloni"	Anathi Mnyango; Lesedi Molefe; Surprise Ndimande	Anatii: BLFR (Additional Production)	03:34
7.	"U'Sangthanda Na?"	Anathi Mnyango; Surprise Ndimande; Tshepo Moloi; Linda Gcwensa	Anatii	02:35
8.	"Vuka"	Anathi Mnyango; Lesedi Molefe; Surprise Ndimande; Castle; Vic Lopez; Christopher Toler; Linda Gcwensa	Anatii	03:41
9.	"God My Best Friend"	Anathi Mnyango; Surprise Ndimande	Anatii	03:47
10.	"Thixo Onofefe"	Anathi Mnyango; Lesedi Molefe; Surprise Ndimande	BLFR: Anatii (co-producer)	03:48
