= All Eyes on Me (AKA song) =

2014 song performed by AKA

Single by AKA featuring Burna Boy, Da L.E.S, and JR

from the album Levels
- Released: 22 October 2014
- Recorded: 2014
- Genre: Hip hop
- Length: 4:18
- Label: Vth Season
- Songwriters: Kiernan Jarryd Forbes; Leslie Jonathan Mampe, Jr; Damini Ogulu; Tabure Thabo Bogopa Junior; Tumelo Thandokuhle Mathebula
- Producer: Tweezy

AKA singles chronology
"Run Jozi (Godly)" (2014)	"All Eyes on Me" (2014)	"Baddest" (2015)

Music video
- "All Eyes On Me" on YouTube

"All Eyes on Me" is a song by South African rapper and record producer AKA featuring Burna Boy, Da L.E.S and JR, released as the fifth single from his second studio album Levels. The song is produced by award-winning producer Tweezy. On 30 November 2016, "All Eyes On Me" was certified Platinum by the Recording Industry of South Africa.

== Composition ==
"All Eyes On Me" contains a sample of "Got a Love For You (Hurley's House Mix)" as performed and written by Jomanda.

== Music video ==
The music video was released on AKA's Vevo account on December 10, 2014, and has over 2 million views. The video features guest appearance of Cashtimelife YouTube.

== Remix ==
"All Eyes on Me (Remix)"

Single by AKA featuring Burna Boy, Stonebwoy and Redsan
- Released: July 30, 2015
- Recorded: 2015
- Genre: Dancehall; Afrobeats
- Length: 4:12
- Label: Vth Season
- Songwriters: Kiernan Jarryd Forbes; Damini Ogulu; Livingstone Etse Satekla; Swabri Mohammed
- Producer: Fahrenheit

On July 30, 2015, the official Dancehall/Afrobeats infused remix of "All Eyes On Me" was released, featuring Burna Boy, Stonebwoy, and Redsan.

== Accolades ==
=== All Africa Music Awards ===
Year	Prize	Result
2015	Best African Collaboration	Won
