= Fistaz Mixwell =

South African DJ and producer

- Born: Phestus Mokgwetsi Victor Matshediso; April 22, 1976 (age 50); Mafikeng, North West, South Africa
- Occupations: DJ; radio host; music producer
- Years active: 1997-present
- Website: www.imixwell.com

Phestus Mokgwetsi Victor Matshediso, well known by his stage name Fistaz Mixwell (born 22 April 1976) is a South African DJ and music producer.

== Early life ==
He was born on 22 April 1976 in Mafikeng, a small town in the North Western Province of South Africa, to Jowie and Edward Matshediso. Fistaz Mixwell attended JD Mosiah Primary School in Rustenburg and in 1988 started Grade 7 at Mmabatho High School in Mafikeng. In 1993 Fistaz Mixwell finished his matric and attended lectures as a Civil Engineering student at the University of Johannesburg in 1994.

== Career ==
In 1997 Fistaz Mixwell joined Channel T radio station as a mobile disco DJ. This is where he met the likes of Iggy Smallz Oskido, Dj SBu and many top Dj names in South Africa today.

He didnt finish his degree, but carved a name for himself as one of Johannesburg's young DJs.

In 1999 Fistaz Mixwell released his first album dubbed 'It's Time" (it achieved gold status in South Africa for 25,000 sales). It featured original tracks co-created by himself, Skizo and Bruce 'Dope' Sebitlo both from the Kalawa Jazmee Record Company.

Fistaz Mixwell has performed in top nightclubs in London, New York City, Miami, Kuala Lumpur, Hong Kong, Malaysia, South Africa, Africa, France, Ireland, Zurich, Lausanne, Geneva and many more cities across the world. In 2004 Fistaz Mixwell joined South Africa's biggest Urban Radio Station with 5.5 Million listeners as the Music manager. In 2006, Metro FM reached a record listenership figure of 6 million and he was highly credited with the music strategy he applied after joining the station. He is currently the Head of New Media and Technology at METRO FM. Fistaz Mixwell also runs his digital design Company, Creativ FM and is also a partner in TOUCHMIXWELL.COM, a company co-created by himself and Tbo Touch. They have formed a formidable force in entertainment and their business interests vary from radio show, TV shows, events and club activations.

In 2011 Fistaz Mixwell left his tenure at METRO FM having headed two [2] posts as Music Manager and later head of New Media. He joined ZAR Empire as CEO and is responsible for transforming the ZAR Brand. While in charge he launched the zaronline website, ZARFEST, and was also involved with the club business and also the So What television show aired on e.tv.

Castle Lite, a premium South African beer manufactured and distributed by SABMiller launched the Enter the State of Cool competition where Fistaz Mixwell was the brand ambassador and Brand Champion. Radio adverts drove listeners to the Castle Lite Facebook Page and to a website specially created for the competition. The winner won an all expenses paid trip with 3 of their friends and Fistaz Mixwell to the United States to go see the world's biggest Ice Bar.

== Discography ==
The below is his discography:

- 1999 - It's Time (EMI, CCP Record Company)
- 2001 - Sumthin' Different (EMI, CCP Record Company)
- 2003 - Mixwell Avenue (Soulcandi, Sheer Music)
- 2005 - Mixwell Lounge (Gresham Records)
- 2006 - Mixwell Expensiv (Soulcandi, Sheer Music)
- 2008 - Mixwell Impressiv (Sheer Music)
- 2010 - Mixwell Xpensiv II: The Recession Antidote (Shelter Music)
- 2010 - Mixwell Collectiv - The Best of Mixwell
- 2011 - Castle Lite - Enter state of Cool (Soulcandi Records)
- 2013 - Mixwell Addictiv the House Fix (Soul Candi Records)
- 2016 - Soul Candi Sessions For The Fans: Disc 2
- 2018 - Mixwell Summer (Universal Music (Pty) Ltd)
