= Run Jozi (Godly) =

2014 single by AKA

Single by AKA featuring K.O

from the album Levels
- Released: 24 June 2014
- Genre: Hip hop; rap
- Length: 4:41
- Label: SME Africa (on behalf of Vth Season)
- Songwriters: Kiernan Forbes; Yanga Ntshakaza; Ntokozo Mdluli; Mpilo Shabangu; S. Raphadu; T. Mathebula
- Producer: Tweezy

AKA singles chronology
"Congratulate" (2014)	"Run Jozi (Godly)" (2014)	"All Eyes On Me" (2014)

K.O singles chronology
"Caracara" (2014)	"Run Jozi (Godly)" (2014)	"Sun of a Gun" (2014)

Music video
- "Run Jozi (Godly) [Official video]" on YouTube

Behind the Scene
- "Run Jozi - BTS" on YouTube

Official audio
- "Run Jozi (Godly) [Official audio]" on YouTube

"Run Jozi (Godly)" is a lead single by South African rapper and songwriter AKA from his second studio album Levels (2014). It features guest appearance from K.O, uncredited vocals from Yanga, and production from Tweezy. It was released on 24 June 2014 through Vth Season with exclusive license from SME Africa.

== Composition and lyrics ==
The track features rap verses by AKA and K.O. over production by beatmaker Tweezy, characterized by loud horn samples and trap-style percussion. The arrangement is driven by brassy hooks and heavy drums typical of 2010s hip-hop. Fellow rapper Yanga Chief performs the uncredited hook (chorus) on the track. Lyrically, “Run Jozi” is a boastful anthem: AKA and K.O. exchange punchy lines about their success and status, centering Johannesburg (“Jozi”) in their narrative. Critics have noted that the song's flow and production draw on contemporary rap trends. For example, the song opens with a verse delivery reminiscent of the Migos’ “Versace” flow, and even echoes Drake's Started From the Bottom in one line (consistent with AKA's theme of rising from humble origins). Overall, the composition blends polished lyricism with local flavor, as the rappers trade “braggadocio bars” over Tweezy's booming horn loops.

== Music video ==
The official music video for “Run Jozi (Godly)” was directed by Yanga Ntshakaza and premiered in early September 2014. Shot entirely in black-and-white, the video highlights iconic Johannesburg locations: scenes include the Regina Mundi Catholic Church in Soweto, the Nelson Mandela Bridge, and the Bree Street taxi rank in downtown Jozi. The visuals also include subtle Nike product placement – showing running shoes – as a nod to the song's title (which references Johannesburg's “We Run Jozi” Nike race). The performers (AKA, K.O. and Yanga) are shown rapping around the city, sometimes in front of cars or in the taxi rank, emphasizing the track's gritty urban vibe

== Critical reception ==
The song quickly became a hit on South African radio and music channels, and is often cited as one of the standout tracks of Levels. Fans have praised it as a classic of 2010s South African hip hop (with some even calling K.O's verse one of the best in recent memory). SA Hip Hop Magazine ranked “Run Jozi” among AKA and K.O.’s signature collaborations, calling it a “prime example” of their chemistry. The track's hook by Yanga Chief, though uncredited, was noted as “infectious” and a key part of the song's appeal.

== Charting ==
The single was certified Gold in South Africa, in 2015 it was nominated for Best Collaboration at the South African Music Awards, and lost to "Caracara" by K.O.

== Certification ==
Region	Certification
South Africa (RISA)	Gold

== Awards and nominations ==
Year	Award ceremony	Prize	Recipient/Nominated work	Results	Ref.
2014	South African Hip Hop Awards	Best Collaboration	"Run Jozi (Godly)"	Won	
2015	South African Music Awards	Best Collaboration	"Run Jozi (Godly)"	Nominated	
