= The Saga =

Single by Anatii featuring AKA

from the album Artiifact and Be Careful What You Wish For
- Released: 2 March 2015
- Genre: Hip hop
- Length: 4:01
- Label: Yal Entertainment; Beam Group; Universal Music South Africa
- Composers: Kiernan Forbes; Nathi Bhongo Mnyango; Dan Joffe
- Lyricists: Kiernan Forbes; Nathi Bhongo Mnyango
- Producers: Anatii; AKA; Dan Joffe

Anatii singles chronology
| "Freedom" (2014) | "The Saga" (2015) | "Feeling on Me" (2015) |

AKA singles chronology
| "All Eyes On Me" (2014) | "The Saga" (2015) | "All Eyes On Me (Remix)" (2015) |

Music video
- "The Saga (Official music video)"

Official audio
- "The Saga"

"The Saga" is a single by South African singer-songwriter and record producer Anatii from his debut studio album Artiifact (2016). The record was released on 2 March 2015 through Yal Entertainment, and it features guest appearance from AKA. It was later included in the pair's collaborative album Be Careful What You Wish For (2017).

On 2 October 2015 AKA released "Composure" throwing shots at Cassper Nyovest, Riky Rick and Anatii amongst others, even stating that Anatii tried to charge him eighty thousand for a beat. A week after the release of "Composure", Riky Rick released "Fuseg" with guest appearances from Cassper Nyovest and Anatii responding to AKA. At 2015 South African Hip Hop Awards, the trio performed their anticipated remix of "The Saga", again throwing shots at AKA. AKA and Anatii reconciled and made up and in January 2017 they put out "10 Fingers", a single from their collaborative album Be Careful What You Wish For.

== Music video ==
On 13 June 2016 the visuals for "The Saga" were published on Anatii's YouTube channel, shot and produced by Studio Space Pictures. As of September 2023, the visuals are now sitting on over 1.7 million views.

== Awards and nominations ==
| Year | Award ceremony | Category | Recipient/Nominated work | Results | Ref. |
|---|---|---|---|---|---|
| 2015 | South African Hip Hop Awards | Best Collaboration | "The Saga" | Won | |
| 2015 | South African Hip Hop Awards | Best Video | "The Saga" | Won | |
