= Levels (album) =

Studio album by AKA
- Released: 30 June 2014
- Recorded: 2012–2014
- Genre: Hip hop
- Length: 39:51
- Labels: Vth Season, Sony Music Entertainment Africa
- Producers: Kiernan Forbes; Tweezy; Master A Flat; Tazzy; Ameen; Sticky

AKA chronology
Altar Ego (2011)	Levels (2014)	Be Careful What You Wish For (2017)

Alternative cover

Singles from Levels
- 1. "Jealousy" Released: 30 July 2012; 2. "Kontrol" Released: 17 April 2013; 3. "Congratulate" Released: 28 February 2014; 4. "Run Jozi (Godly)" Released: 24 June 2014; 5. "All Eyes on Me" Released: 22 October 2014; 6. "Sunshine"; 7. "Sim Dope"

Levels (sometimes stylised LVLS) is the second studio album by South African rapper AKA, released by Vth Season. It is the follow-up to his debut release, Altar Ego. The album was made available a week before its originally announced 8 July release date on 30 June 2014. The album was certified gold on 17 June 2015, selling over 20 000 copies almost 11 months after its release. It has since been certified Diamond in sales excess 300,000 units, 10 Platinum (X1 Diamond).

The album's release was preceded by the singles "Jealousy", "Kontrol", "Congratulate" and "Run Jozi (Godly)", which features K.O of Teargas. Originally slated for physical release on 8 July 2014, the hard copies of the album were later released on 28 July 2014 due to manufacturing issues. Production was handled by AKA, Ameen, Tazzy from the funk band Muzart, Steve "Sticky" Raphadu, Master A Flat who was also the album's musical director and Vth Season's in-house producer, Tweezy.

Guest features on the album include Burna Boy, Da L.E.S, Sarkodie and Mi Casa's lead vocalist, J'Something. Levels peaked at number 1 on the iTunes South African chart a day after its release.

== Critical reception ==
The album received generally positive reviews. While some critics complained about the excessive sampling on the album, most praised the album for its production but felt like AKA did not deliver lyrically.

Ayomide Tayo of Nigerian Entertainment Today praised songs such as "Sunshine" and "Congratulate" for their soulful vibes. He also commended AKA for his lyrical content and the direction he took with the production on the album. He ended his review with the closing statement, "AKA has shown that there are levels to this rap thing, and that he is at the highest level. What else would you expect from a king?"

== Commercial performance ==
In July 2015, 11 months after the initial release of the album, Levels was certified Gold by the Recording Industry of South Africa, for sales in access of 20,000 copies. In May 2016, the album reached platinum status after selling 40,000 copies. As of December 2020 the album has been certified Diamond in sales excess 300,000 units, 10 Platinum (X1 Diamond).

== Accolades ==
Levels has received numerous nominations and has won a respectable number of awards. At the 2014 SA Hip Hop Awards, the album won 4 awards including Best Male, Video of the Year for "Congratulate", and Best Collaboration for "Run Jozi (Godly)". The song "Congratulate" had AKA nominated for 3 awards at the Channel O Africa Music Video Awards including Most Gifted Hip Hop and Most Gifted Video of the Year; he ended winning the former. At the 14th annual Metro FM Music Awards, he received 6 nominations and walked away with Best Collaboration for the song "All Eyes on Me". At the 2015 SAMAs, "Run Jozi (Godly)" was nominated for Best Collaboration, ultimately losing to K.O.'s "Caracara". "Congratulate" was nominated for Kia Record of the Year. The album was also nominated for Best Rap Album; AKA won Best Male Artist.

== Track listing ==
No.	Title	Writer(s)	Producer(s)	Length
1.	"Levels" (performed by Tumi)	T. Molekane, K. Forbes, S. Raphadu, T. Mathebula, M. Shabangu	Sticky, Tweezy^{[a]}, Master A Flat^{[a]}	1:08
2.	"Sim Dope"	K. Forbes, S. Raphadu, T. Mathebula, M. Shabangu	Tweezy, Sticky^{[a]}	3:55
3.	"Run Jozi (Godly)" (featuring K.O and Yanga Chief)	K. Forbes, N. Mdluli, S. Raphadu, T. Mathebula, M. Shabangu, Y. Ntshakaza	Tweezy, Sticky^{[a]}, Master A Flat^{[a]}	4:06
4.	"Sunshine" (featuring J'Something & Sarkodie)	K. Forbes, J. Fonseca, M. Addo, S. Raphadu, M. Shabangu, A. Darnell, S. Browder, Jr., S. Mackey	AKA, ^{[a]}, Master A Flat^{[a]}	4:04
5.	"Congratulate"	K. Forbes, T. Lehutso	Tazzy	4:03
6.	"All Eyes on Me" (featuring Burna Boy, Da L.E.S & JR)	K. Forbes, D. Ogulu, L. Mampe, T. Bogopa, T. Mathebula	Tweezy	4:38
7.	"Daddy Issues"	K. Forbes, A. Harron, M. Shabangu, K. Smoke	Master A Flat, Ameen^{[a]}	4:47
8.	"Let Me Show You"	K. Forbes, S. Raphadu, M. Shabangu, Lonnie Simmons, K. Choabi, Charlie Wilson, Johnsye Smith, Ronnie Wilson	Sticky, Master A Flat^{[a]}	3:46
9.	"Kontrol" (featuring Da L.E.S)	K. Forbes, L. Mampe, S. Raphadu, M. Shabangu, M. Tulwana	AKA, Sticky^{[a]}, Master A Flat^{[a]}	5:27
10.	"Pressure" (featuring Reason)	K. Forbes, A. Harron, M. MacInnes, S. Moeketsi	Ameen	3:02
11.	"Jealousy"	K. Forbes, Martin Solveig	AKA	3:22
12.	"Levels Unlocked"			15:11
13.	"Moments In Life"			5:23
Total length:				39:51

Notes

- ^{^[a]} signifies a co-producer
- ^{^[b]} signifies an additional producer

Other credits

- "Levels" is performed by Tumi
- "Run Jozi (Godly)" contains uncredited vocals from Yanga Ntshakaza
- "Congratulate" contains background vocals from JR

Sample credits

- "Sim Dope" contains a sample of "Loud" as performed by Mac Miller and written by Jeremy Kulousek and Malcolm McCormick. The song also includes a sample of "Mama Afrika" as performed by MXO.
- "Sunshine" includes a sample of "Sunshowers" written by Steve Mackey, August Darnell, Stony Jr. Browder, as performed by M.I.A. It also samples "Sunshower" as performed by Dr. Buzzard's Original Savannah Band.
- "Congratulate" contains a sample of "Ride" as performed by Harrison Crump.
- "All Eyes On Me" contains a sample of "Ngiyakusaba" as performed and written by Brenda Fassie.
- "Daddy Issues" includes elements of "Super Rich Kids" written by Frank Ocean, Malay, Earl Sweatshirt, Kirk Robinson, Nathaniel Robinson Jr., Ray Hammond, Mark Morales and Mark Rooney, as performed by Frank Ocean and Earl Sweatshirt.
- "Let Me Show You" contains vocals from "You Are My High", written by Charlie Wilson, Ronnie Wilson and Johnsye Smith, as performed by The Gap Band.
- "Kontrol" contains a sample of "Mawe", performed by DJ Mbuso and Jerah.
- "Pressure" contains a sample of "Drop the Pressure", written by Myles MacInnes, as performed by Mylo.
- "Jealousy" contains a sample of "Jealousy" as performed by Martin Solveig.

== Release history ==
Release history and formats for Levels
Country	Date	Format	Label
South Africa	30 June 2014	digital download	Vth Season, Sony Music Entertainment Africa
South Africa	28 July 2014	CD	Vth Season, Sony Music Entertainment Africa
South Africa	August 2015	LP	Vth Season, Sony Music Entertainment Africa
