= Artiifact =

ARTIIFACT

Studio album by Anatii
- Released: 9 September 2016
- Recorded: 2014–2016
- Studio: Tea Time Studios, South Africa; Truth Studios, United States of America
- Genre: Hip hop; R&B; Afro Beat
- Length: 67:09
- Language: English; isiXhosa
- Label: YAL Entertainment
- Producer: Anatii (exec.); Dan Joffe (exec.); Taz Arnold (exec.); Joseph-I (exec.); DJ Maphorisa; Young Egypt

Singles from ARTIIFACT
- 1. "Freedom" Released: 19 August 2014; 2. "The Saga" Released: 2 March 2015; 3. "Feeling on Me" Released: 14 August 2015; 4. "Jump" Released: 10 January 2016; 5. "Hours" Released: 9 June 2016; 6. "Tell Me" Released: 5 September 2016

Artiifact (stylized as ARTIIFACT) is the debut studio album by South African hip hop record producer and musician Anatii. The album was released on 9 September 2016 by his record label YAL Entertainment, after many delays and following singles "Freedom" and "The Saga", which were released in 2014 and early 2015, respectively. The album was initially titled Electronic Bushman.

== Promotion ==
In promotion of his debut studio release, Anatii commenced celebrations with an album release party at Moloko Club in Hatfield, east of Pretoria on 9 September 2016.

Anatii hosted the ARTIIFACT Tour, which had dates for shows in Midrand and Durban on 30 September and 2 October 2016, respectively. The tour featured main opening act, American singer, friend and collaborator Omarion.

== Track listing ==
No.	Title	Writer(s)	Producer(s)	Length
1.	"Almighty"	Anathi Mnyango; Surprise Simangaliso Ndimande	Anatii	3:03
2.	"Pray for the Children"	A. Mnyango; Bryan Schimmel; Surprise Simangaliso Ndimande	Anatii	5:12
3.	"Freedom"	A. Mnyango	Anatii	3:14
4.	"Akheko" (featuring Faarrow)	A. Mnyango; Iman Hashi; Siham Hashi	Anatii	4:21
5.	"Feeling on Me"	A. Mnyango; Dan Saul Joffe	Anatii	3:24
6.	"Proper" (with Tiwa Savage)	A. Mnyango; Tiwatope Savage-Balogun	Anatii	4:15
7.	"Hours"	A. Mnyango; Tamika Faye Means; S.Ndimande	Anatii	3:26
8.	"Tell Me" (featuring Omarion)	A. Mnyango; Omari Grandberry	Anatii	3:22
9.	"Overdrive"	A. Mnyango; Precious Solly Obokeng Mosetle	Anatii	4:16
10.	"Thanda"	A. Mnyango; Precious Solly Obokeng Mosetle	Anatii	4:31
11.	"Walk Away"	A. Mnyango; James Felix; Karl Rubin Brutus; Annrosette Dorcely	Anatii	4:30
12.	"Y.A.W.I. (Interlude)"	A. Mnyango; S. Ndimande	Anatii	3:29
13.	"The Saga" (featuring AKA)	A. Mnyango; Kiernan Forbes; Dan Saul Joffe	Anatii	4:03
14.	"So Many Rooms"	A. Mnyango	Anatii	4:08
15.	"The Long Way"	A. Mnyango; Tamika Faye Means	Young Egypt; Ray Real (co-producer)	2:17
16.	"Hold On" (featuring Uhuru)	A. Mnyango; Sihle Dlalisa; Themba Sekowe; Xelimpilo Simelane	Anatii; DJ Maphorisa	4:47
17.	"Jump" (with Cassper Nyovest featuring Nasty C)	A. Mnyango; Refiloe Phoolo; David Ngcobo	Anatii	5:00
Total length:				67:09
