= Fifi Cooper =

South African recording artist

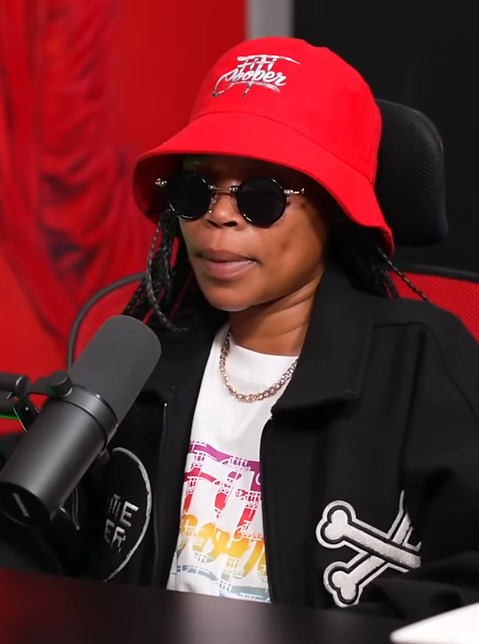
- Fifi Cooper in 2024

Background information
- Also known as: Motswako First lady
- Born: Refilwe Boingotlo Moeketsi; 24 October 1991 (age 34); Montshiwa, Mahikeng, North West, South Africa
- Genres: Motswako, R&B, hip hop
- Occupations: singer-songwriter, rapper
- Instrument: Vocals
- Years active: 2008–present
- Labels: Ambitiouz (former); Mó Cooper Records

Refilwe Boingotlo Moeketsi (born 24 October 1991), known professionally as Fifi Cooper is a South African recording artist. Fifi Cooper started her music career as an R&B singer before her musical versatility saw her release her breakthrough rap single "Chechela Morago" in 2010. In 2015, she released her award-winning debut studio album 20FIFI.

== Early life and education ==
Fifi Cooper is the last of three children. She had her early education in Montshiwa, Mahikeng, South Africa, where she also harnessed her ability in singing and dancing. She completed her secondary school education at Batswana High School, Mahikeng and her higher education at Boston Media House where she studied Media.

== Career ==
=== 2008–2014: Early beginnings ===
Fifi Cooper began singing at the age of 8 while in primary school; participating in various social extra-curricula activities. She professionally started her music career in 2008 when she made a guest appearance on Mo'Molemi's Motzamai: Rebel With a Pause album. Her breakthrough however came in 2010 following the release of her single titled "Chechela Morago", a rap song that received massive airplay and did well to gain her new grounds in the South African music industry. Fifi Cooper also made vocal appearances in the remix of AKA's "Baddest Remix" single, Mo'Molemi's album titled Asia, Khuli Chana's Lost in Time and Lection's Gentlemen's Club.

=== 2015–2019: 20FIFI ===
In 2015, Fifi Cooper signed a recording contract with Ambitiouz Entertainment, a South Africa-based record label. In early 2015, she released an AB Crazy-produced song titled "Kisses". The music video for "Kisses" was directed by Dino Benedetti and was released on YouTube on 24 May 2015.

On 13 November 2015, Fifi Cooper released 20FIFI, her debut studio album which won three awards at the 15th Metro FM Music Awards and was further nominated in the "Best Newcomer of The Year" and "Best Female Artist of The Year" categories at the 2nd edition of the South African Music Awards.

==== Departure from Ambitiouz, legal issues ====
In February 2017, Fifi Cooper departed from Ambitiouz Entertainment along with A-Reece and the hip hop duo B3nchMarQ. Following Cooper's departure from Ambitiouz, a court case ensued in which the label successfully sued her for copyright infringement. The Johannesburg High Court ruled that Cooper no longer had ownership of the songs she recorded under the label and ordered her to either return or delete all copies of the material. Additionally, she was required to pay damages and cover the legal costs of the case. This legal action stemmed from Cooper’s resignation without obtaining a clearance certificate, leaving her unable to use or perform her own music. In the aftermath, Julius Malema, leader of the Economic Freedom Fighters (EFF), intervened after learning of Fifi Cooper’s legal dispute with Ambitiouz Entertainment. Viewing the case as a systemic injustice, the EFF supported Cooper and negotiated an out-of-court settlement. This agreement restored her rights to perform her music and continue her career. Malema framed the intervention as a stand against inequity rather than a personal endorsement of the artist.

=== 2020-present ===
After the departure from Ambitiouz, she founded her own record label Mo Cooper Records and later released her first album. The 21 track album titled "Take Me Back" which includes songs such as "Freedom & "Zwagala", features the likes of Thabsie, Moozlie, Towdeemac and Leon Lee.

In November 2020, Fifi Cooper released her first single "Net So" off of her upcoming 2021 album titled Chapters. The music video for "Net So" which was shot by Mo Cooper Visuals, is also written & directed by The Boss Lady herself. On 11 March 2021, her single "Motlogeleng" was released.

== Artistry ==
Regarded by the local media as the "Motswako first lady", Fifi Coopers' musical versatility can see her rap and sing. Credited as the vocalist on Khuli Chana's hit single "Mnatebawen", she does the hip hop and Motswako genres of music. In an interview with YoMzansi, Fifi Cooper describes her style of rap as "unpredictable, punchy and hearty".

== Discography ==
=== Studio albums ===
Title	Album details
20FIFI	Released: 13 November 2015; Label: Ambitiouz Entertainment; Format: CD, digital download
Take Me Back	Released: 2018; Label: MoCooper Records; Format: digital download

=== As lead artist ===
List of singles as lead artist, with selected chart positions and certifications, showing year released and album name
Title	Year	Peak chart positions	Certifications	Album
Title	Year	ZA	Certifications	Album
"Truth or Dare 2.0"	2016	—		
"Stop (Coke Studio South Africa: Season 2)" (Fifi Cooper, Ryki)	2016	—		
"Phambili"	2016	—		
"Take Me Back"	2017	—		
"Zwagala" (featuring Obakeng Moribe)	2018	—		
"Net So"	2020	—		
"Motlogeleng"	2021	—		
"Ngeke" (featuring Lwah Ndlunkulu)	2023	—		
"Running" (featuring Swift1520)	2023	—		
"—" denotes a recording that did not chart or was not released in that territory.

== Personal life ==
Fifi Cooper is a single mother, she has a son named Resego.

== Awards and nominations ==
Year	Award ceremony	Prize	Work/Recipient	Result	Ref
2015	15th Metro FM Music Awards	Best Newcomer	Herself	Won	
2015	15th Metro FM Music Awards	Best Produced Album	20FIFI	Won	
2015	15th Metro FM Music Awards	Best Female Album	20FIFI	Won	
2016	22nd South African Music Awards	Newcomer of the Year	Herself	Nominated	
2016	22nd South African Music Awards	Female Artist of the Year	Herself	Nominated	
2023	Basadi in Music Awards	Hip Hop Artist of the Year	"Ngeke" featuring Lwah Ndlunkulu	Nominated	
