= Tumi and the Volume =

- Origin: Johannesburg, South Africa
- Genres: Hip hop
- Labels: Ready Rolled, Sakifo, Urbnet
- Members: David Bergman; Paulo Chibanga; Tiago Correia-Paulo; Tumi Molekane
- Past members: Kyla-Rose Smith
- Website: thevolume.co.za

Tumi and the Volume was an African Hip-hop music ensemble that includes rapper Tumi Molekane, Lead Guitarist Tiago Correia-Paulo, Bass Guitarist David Bergman and Drummer Paulo Chibanga. The outfit also included Kyla-Rose Smith on the Violin for the first couple of years. The act is often associated with the Mozambican band 340ml because it shares some of its core members.

Their releases include the live album At The Bassline (2004), and the studio albums Tumi and the Volume (2006) and Pick a Dream (2010).

In December 2012 the band officially disbanded.

== Formation and career ==
The group formed in Johannesburg, South Africa, in 2002, after Tumi Molekane met the band The Volume, which featured musicians from the band 340ml.

Very soon after starting to play together the band decided to release their first album (At The Bassline), a live album which captured how and where the band started, as a sort of live jam band, building a musical narrative around Tumi's words. They had immediate success and got picked up by record labels and management. They toured extensively in Southern Africa, Canada and Europe. And recorded two more albums in the decade they were together.

== Discography ==
- At The Bassline (2004)
- Tumi and the Volume (2006)
- Pick a Dream (2010)
