= Chad (rapper) =

- Also known as: Chad da Don
- Born: Donovan Chad Mansoor; 16 April 1993 (age 33); Pretoria, Gauteng, South Africa
- Origin: Midrand, Gauteng, South Africa
- Genres: Hip hop; Motswako
- Occupations: Musician; record producer; rapper; songwriter; actor; entertainer
- Years active: 2011 – present
- Labels: ContraBanned (currently); DCM Entertainment (currently); Family Tree Records (formerly)

Donovan Chad Mansoor (born 16 April 1993), known mononymously as Chad (and previously as Chad Da Don), is a South African hip-hop record producer, songwriter and rapper. Chad released his debut studio album The Book of Chad on 16 April 2016, his 23rd birthday.

== Background ==
Chad was born and raised in Pretoria and eventually relocated to Midrand in his teenage years. Chad had started a Christian rap group while he was a teenager, but went solo shortly after. While growing up, Chad played football and represented South Africa in the under-14 national squad. The tournament was hosted in Zurich.

== Musical career ==
Chad released his debut single titled "Hola", featuring his then label-boss Cassper Nyovest. Due to creative differences, Chad left Family Tree Records and started his own label imprint DCM Entertainment. Amongst those signed are fellow artists and songwriters his best friend Bonafide and rapper Exe. Chad is now also signed to Locnville's new label ContraBanned.

The track "Wasted", by Chad and Locnville is featured on the hit US TV show, Lucifer in Episode 213.

On October 23, 2020, his studio album, Dreams Don’t Sleep was released.

== Discography ==
=== Studio albums ===
Album title	Album details
The Book of Chad	Released: 16 April 2016; Label: DCM Entertainment; Formats: CD, Digital Download
Stay in Your Lane	Released: 22 November 2019; Label: D.C.M Entertainment; Formats: CD, Digital Download
