= Da L.E.S =

South African rapper

- Also known as: North God; L.E.S; 2 Def; Chuchu
- Born: Leslie Jonathan Mampe Jr. 26 July 1985 (age 40); Washington, D.C., United States
- Origin: South Africa
- Citizenship: United States (citizenship by birth); South Africa (1985–present)
- Genres: Hip hop; crunk; trap
- Occupations: Rapper; record executive
- Years active: 1993–present
- Labels: Fresh 2 Def Productions SME South Africa (current); Ghetto Ruff (former)

Leslie Jonathan Mampe Jr., (born 26 July 1985), better known by his stage name Da L.E.S, is a South African-American hip hop recording artist and record producer. He achieved early success with his band, Jozi, and is most known for his solo single, "Heaven", which was released in 2013, and features AKA, and Maggz.

== Early life and music career ==
Mampe was born in Washington, D.C., United States, to South African parents, Leslie Jonathan Mampe, an IT specialist who worked at IBM, and his wife, Priscilla. Mampe, Sr. was a collector of music LPs and was known for hosting parties. It is through this that Mampe discovered his musical talents at a young age, while living in the United States with his parents.

Da L.E.S. ushered in a new fun era of rap characterized by his cool kid demeanor and college swag aesthetic. It stuck and quickly became the new flavor of the streets. Les was also largely responsible for the continental success of the Ama Kip Kip brand, which he helped popularize by always flaunting them in his music videos. Most South Africans during that period wore AKK and danced to Muthaland Crunk.

According to creative-hiphop Da Les is the only African rapper whose influence covered all three major facets of hip hop – music, clothing and lifestyle. Creative-HipHop's editor in chief, Paperman named him the most influential African Rapper of all time.

In 2014, Mampe starred in a South African television series, The Real Jozi A-Listers, as a lead character alongside South African television and media personality Maps Maponyane, both playing fictionalized versions of themselves.

== Personal life ==
In 2017, Mampe welcomed the birth of his daughter, whose godfather was South African hip hop recording artist and good friend AKA. Da L.E.S is the godfather to AKA's daughter.

== Discography ==
=== Studio albums ===
Album title	Album details
Fresh 2 Def	Released: 1 January 2006; Label: Ghetto Ruff; Formats: CD, digital download
Mandela Money	Released: 4 July 2014; Label: Fresh 2 Def, Sony Music Entertainment Africa; Formats: CD, digital download
North God	Released: 27 November 2015; Label: Fresh 2 Def, Sony Music Entertainment Africa; Formats: CD, digital download
Diamond in Africa	Released: 9 December 2016; Label: Fresh 2 Def, Sony Music Entertainment Africa; Formats: digital download
F2D Presents: Hall of Fame	Released: 10 March 2017; Label: Fresh 2 Def; Formats: digital download
High Level	Released: 29 September 2017; Label: Fresh 2 Def; Formats: CD, digital download
Caution to the Wild	• Released: 27 November 2020 • Label: Fresh 2 Def • Formats: CD, digital download and streaming

313

|

- Released: 1 December 2023
- Label: Fresh 2 Def

=== Singles ===
Year	Title	Certifications	Album
2008	"Tippy Toes"		Fresh 2 Def
2008	"We on Fire" (featuring Bongz and Maggz)		Fresh 2 Def
2013	"Heaven" (featuring AKA and Maggz)		Mandela Money
2013	"Fire"		Mandela Money
2014	Dice		Mandela Money
2015	"P.A.I.D" (featuring AKA and Burna Boy)		North God
2015	"Bank Roll" (DJ Milkshake featuring Da L.E.S and Kid X)		North God
2015	"Summer Time" (featuring Riky Rick)		North God
2016	"6 AM" (featuring Ma-E and Moozlie)		North God
2016	"Real Stuff" (featuring AKA and Maggz)		North God
2016	"Up to Something"		Diamond in Africa
2016	"Lifestyle" (featuring Gemini Major)		Diamond in Africa
2017	"Popular Demand"		High Level

List of singles as featured artist, with certifications, showing year released and album name
Year	Title	Certifications	Album
2013	"Hape Le Hape, Part 2" (Khuli Chana featuring Da L.E.S and Magesh)		Lost in Time
2013	"Bunny Jump" (Awgust Rush featuring Ferdy Ferd and Da L.E.S)		
2013	"Kontrol" (AKA featuring Da L.E.S)		Levels
2014	"All Eyes on Me" (AKA featuring JR, Da L.E.S and Burna Boy)	RiSA: Platinum	Levels
2014	"Poppin'" (Pascal & Pearce featuring Da L.E.S)		
2014	"Bad Chick" (DJ Speedsta featuring Da L.E.S and Dotcom)		
2014	"Light a Lighter" (Cara featuring Da L.E.S)		
2015	"Shake" (Olivia Cloud featuring Da L.E.S)		
2015	"Bank Roll" (DJ Milkshake featuring Da L.E.S and Kid X)		North God
2015	"Summer Love" (YBK featuring Da L.E.S, Burna Boy & Gemini Major)		
2015	"Birthday" (Burna Boy featuring AKA, Kid X and Da L.E.S)		
2016	"Savage" (DJ Milkshake featuring Da L.E.S, Maggz and Nadia Nakai)		
2016	"One For The Team" (DJ Double D featuring Da L.E.S, Yanga and Gemini Major)		F2D Presents: Hall of Fame
2017	"Who Shot Ya" (Yanga featuring Da L.E.S)		F2D Presents: Hall of Fame
2017	"4Ways" (DJ Switch featuring Da L.E.S and Yanga)		

List of non-single guest appearances, with other performing artists, showing year released and album name
Title	Year	Album
"So Fresh" (Danny K featuring Da L.E.S)	2013	Good Look
"In My City" (L-Tido featuring Gotti, Maggz, Da L.E.S and Riky Rick)	2013	All of Me
"Addicted" (Yung6ix featuring Da L.E.S)	2015	6ix O'Clock
"Too Many Girls" (DJ Speedsta featuring Da L.E.S and Dotcom)	2015	
"Oceans" (DJ Sliqe featuring Da L.E.S and Shane Eagle)	2016	Injayam, Vol. 1
"Freakend" (Stogie T featuring Da L.E.S)	2016	Stogie T

== Videography ==
Year	Artist	Title	Album	Director	Ref
2008	Da L.E.S	Tippy Toes	Fresh 2 Def		
2008	Da L.E.S	We On Fire (featuring Bongani Fassie and Maggz)	Fresh 2 Def		
2013	AKA	Kontrol	Levels		
2013	Da L.E.S	Heaven (featuring AKA and Maggz)	Mandela Money		
2014	Da L.E.S	Fire	Mandela Money		
2014	Da L.E.S	Dice	Mandela Money		
2014	Khuli Chana	Hape Le Hape 2.1 (featuring Da L.E.S and Magesh)	Lost in Time		
2014	AKA (rapper)	All Eyes on Me (AKA song) (featuring Burna Boy, JR and Da L.E.S)	Levels		Young Legend Films
2014	DJ Speedsta	Bad Chick (featuring DotCom and Da L.E.S)	Non-album single		Studio Space Pictures
2015	Da L.E.S	P.A.I.D (featuring AKA and Burna Boy)	North God	Sesan	
2015	Da L.E.S	Summer Time (featuring Riky Rick)	North God	Sesan	
2015	YBK	Summer Love (featuring Burna Boy, Gemini Major and Da L.E.S)	Non-album single		
2016	Da L.E.S	6 A.M. (featuring Ma-E and Moozlie)	North God		
2016	Da L.E.S	Real Stuff (featuring AKA and Maggz)	North God		
2016	Da L.E.S	Up to Something	Diamond in Africa	YeahLenzo	
