= Khuli Chana =

- Born: Khulane Morule; 27 August 1982 (age 43)
- Origin: Mmabatho, North West, South Africa
- Occupations: Rapper, songwriter
- Years active: 1992–present
- Spouse: Lamiez Holworthy (m. 2019)
- Labels: Mythrone Records; Raw X Studios; BLURG_SA
- Website: khulichana.com

Khulane Morule (born 27 August 1982), better known by his stage name Khuli Chana, is a South African Motswako rapper.

In 2014, he released his single titled Hape Le Hape 2.1 featuring Da L.E.S and Magesh. In September of the year, he released the video of the single titled Never Grow Up.

== Early life and career ==
Morule was born in the Mmabatho, North West Province and started rapping Motswako at a young age. He was a member of a rap group called Morafe. He then proceeded to go solo, after the rap group took a break from releasing music as a unit.

Khuli Chana rose to fame after releasing his major successful album Motswakoriginator, which infuses both the Setswana and English languages. Motswako is a mixture of both languages and the sound and style of music originates from Mahikeng, a small town in the North West Province.

In 2014, Chana was nominated for Most Valuable Artist and Video of the Year at 2014 South African Hip Hop Awards.

He has shared a stage with Canadian rapper Drake, as an opening act.

Khuli Chana partnered with vodka brand Absolut as one of their ambassadors for the South Africa market.

== Personal life ==
In 2013, Khuli was nearly killed when members of the South African police mistook him for a criminal and proceeded to fire nine bullets at his vehicle. He fully recovered, cleared his name, settled out of court for R1.8 million. Khuli Chana married DJ and television personality Lamiez Holworthy in 2019. The couple welcome their son Leano-Laone Zion Morule on 9 March 2023. He also has a daughter Nia Lefika from a previous relationship.

== Discography ==
Studio albums

- Morafe (2004)
- Motswakoriginator (2009)
- Lost in Time (2012)
- One Source (2016)
- Planet of The Have Nots (2018)
