= JR (rapper) =

South African entrepreneur and musician

JR Bogopa
- Born: Tabure Thabo Bogopa Junior; 12 March 1987 (age 38); Bloemfontein, Free State, South Africa
- Origin: Johannesburg, South Africa
- Genres: Hip hop; Motswako
- Occupations: Rapper; hype man; songwriter; record producer; A&R executive; entrepreneur
- Instrument: Vocals
- Years active: 2007–present
- Labels: Feel Good Music

Tabure Thabo Bogopa Junior (born 12 March 1987), professionally known as JR, is a South African entrepreneur and musician. He frequently performs Motswako rap, in both Setswana and English. He has had two number-one hip hop songs as well as two number-one pop hits on South African charts.

== Early life ==
Tabure was born 12 March 1987 in Bloemfontein, Free State province, South Africa. He was raised in the township of Attridgeville in Pretoria, where he lived with his parents.

== Career ==
=== The Main Event (2008) ===
On 28 April 2008, JR released his first studio album under Electromode Music, The Main Event. The single "Gata Le Nna", produced by 37 mph (Mpho Pholo of Reck Shoppe Tunes) and featuring Towdee was number 1 on both YFM and Metro FM for over six weeks. The single won an award for "Song of The Year, Hip Hop" at the Hype Awards in 2008. The album was nominated in the "Best Hip Hop Album" in 2008 at the Metro FM Awards, also received a nomination nod at the 2009 South African Music Awards for "Best Hip Hop Album". JR subsequently signed an endorsement deal with Renault SA.

=== Colourfull (2009) ===
In 2009, JR released his second studio album, Colourfull. His second single from the album, "Show Dem" featured rapper HHP and comedian Joey Rasdien, and was number 1 spot on several national radio stations. The single was nominated at the 2010 Channel O Music Video Awards for "Song of The Year". JR was subsequently featured in two editions of MTV "Base Nights", and signed an endorsement deal with Vodacom.

JR collaborated with Die Heuwels and hip hop artist, Jack Parow, who raps in English and Afrikaans. The two released their song "Show Goes On" which was originally written by JR himself for rock artist Khan of the band The Parlotones, who left for their world tour during the release of their album. JR also co-wrote "No More Hunger" for Khuli Chana, Tuks Senganga's "Tseo", Lonehill Estate's "Look Good", Louise Carver's "You Think You Got It Easy", "Jealousy" for AKA and co-wrote "Summa Yama Summa" for Coca-Cola.

During this period he also discovered and signed rapper sensation Yanga Chief to his label Feel Good Music. Writing and producing a couple of records for Yanga Chief including his break out hit single Awuth'Yam featuring Kid X and AKA.

=== Kool Forever (2012) ===
Kool Forever was J.R's third studio album. Released under his record label, Feel Good Music, the album received mainly positive reviews, employing a mash up of electric hip hop and Kwaito. His first single "Phuma" received urban radio airplay. The second single "Muntu" was a mix of pop and mbaqanga, and was on frequent rotation on radio and TV music channels. The album featured the artists Prokid, Shugasmakx, Reason, Nokwazi, Cabo Snoop, AKA, Maxhoba, Louise Carver, DJ Dimplez and production by 37 mph.

=== 2014 ===
JR worked as a producer and writer on rapper Aka's latest album Levels, co-writing the first single "Congratulate", which had success in the charts of several African countries. Shortly after that he produced and wrote DJ Dimplez' single "Way Up" featuring JR and Cassper Nyovest. He wrote and produced Shugasmakx's single "Trust It". Later in 2014 he released the single "Soena Papa" from an album planned for 2015. He has also released a single, "Deny", with Anatii. Towards the end of 2014 he signed rapper Shane Eagle to his label and went on to release the song that would change Eagle's career, "Way UP" featuring BigStar Johnson, along with a cappella super group Beyond Vocal.

=== 2019 ===
In 2019 JR and Feel Good Music signed duo Jobe London and Mphow69. Together, they released "Sukendleleni", on which JR is credited as co-producer and writer.

=== 2021 ===
JR and his partners founded FYVE, the first music distribution app in Africa.

=== 2022 ===
JR became a judge for the 18th series of Idols South Africa.

== Awards ==
- 2009 SAMAS – Best Rap
- 2008 MTV Hype Awards – Best Hip Hop Record
- 2008 Metro Awards – Best Hip Hop Album
- 2010 Nigeria Sound City Awards – Discovery of the Year

== Discography ==
=== The Main Event (2008) ===
Singles: So Hot ft TeePee (Prod. 37 mph), Gata Le Nna ft Towdee (Prod. 37 mph), Mathata ft SFS, Mnqobi (Prod. 37 mph), "Ole Time Feeling".

=== Colourfull (2009) ===
Singles: Aga Shame, Show Dem (Make the Circle Bigger), Show Goes On ft. Jack Parow & Die Heuwels Fantasties.

=== Kool Forever (2012) ===
Singles: "Muntu" ft Nokwazi, "Ek Smaak Jou", "Toast" with Dj Dimplez and George Avakian, "Imbizo" ft PRO and Shugasmakx

=== What a life (2017) ===
Singles:"vibing", "sauce", "Imin'iYeza"

=== Love Me Now (2018) ===
"heartless"
