= AKA (rapper) =

South African rapper (1988–2023)

- Forbes in 2014
- Born: Kiernan Jarryd Forbes; 28 January 1988; Western Cape, South Africa
- Died: 10 February 2023 (aged 35); Durban, South Africa
- Cause of death: Gunshot wounds
- Other names: Supamega; Bhova
- Occupations: Rapper; singer; songwriter; record producer; audio engineer; entrepreneur
- Years active: 2002–2023
- Works: Discography
- Partners: DJ Zinhle (2012–2015; 2018–2019); Bonang Matheba (2015–2017); Anele Tembe (died 2021); Nadia Nakai (2022–2023; his death)
- Children: 1
- Musical career
- Origin: Johannesburg, South Africa
- Genres: Hip-hop; afrobeats
- Instruments: Vocals; DAW; sampler
- Labels: Vth Season; Beam Group (former); Sony Music Africa

Kiernan Jarryd Forbes (28 January 1988 – 10 February 2023), known professionally as AKA and also Supamega, was a South African rapper, record producer, and businessman. Born in Cape Town and raised in Johannesburg, Forbes gained recognition after releasing his single "Victory Lap" from his debut studio album, Altar Ego (2011). Often regarded as one of the greatest South African musicians of all time, he was one of the most popular South African musicians of his era and the best-selling South African hip-hop artist of all-time.

Forbes continued his success by releasing studio albums including Levels (2014), a collaborative album with Anatii titled Be Careful What You Wish For (2017), Touch My Blood (2018) and his final album, Mass Country (2023).

On 10 February 2023, Forbes was shot dead outside a restaurant in Durban.

== Early life and education ==
Kiernan Jarryd Forbes was born in Cape Town, South Africa 28 January 1988 into a Christian family. He is the eldest of two boys, and is the older brother of Steffan Forbes. He moved to Johannesburg at a young age and attended St John's College.

== Career ==
=== 2002-2013: the beginnings and Alter Ego ===
In 2002, Forbes, alongside his two friends Vice Versa (Sizwe Mpofu-Walsh) and Greyhound, formed a hip-hop group called Entity. The group received a nomination for a KORA Award in the Best African Hip Hop category. Entity disbanded in 2006 and Forbes went on to study sound engineering. In 2006, Forbes co-founded the production collective The I.V League alongside two other members. The I.V League made production credits for several artists, including Khuli Chana, ProKid and JR. In 2009, he released three singles: "In My Walk", "I Do", and "Mistakes".

On 28 July 2010, Forbes released "I Want It All", the lead single from his debut studio album, Altar Ego. The album also pre-released two singles which were "All I Know" and "Victory Lap". "Victory Lap" was successful as it topped South African local radio charts. Alter Ego was then released on 23 August 2011. The album was certified gold by RiSA for its commercial success. The album won several accolades, including the 2011 Metro FM Awards for Best Hip Hop Album. Forbes won Best Male Artist of the Year at the 2012 South African Music Awards.

=== 2014–2017: Levels and Be Careful What You Wish For ===
Forbes released his second album, titled Levels, on 30 June 2014. The album was supported by four singles: "Jealousy", "Kontrol" (featuring Da L.E.S), "Congratulate" and "Run Jozi (Godly)" which features KO and Yanga. The album was certified platinum in 2014, and double platinum in 2018 by RiSA. This album gave Forbes the unique distinction of being the first South African rapper to go platinum with an album mainly recorded in English.

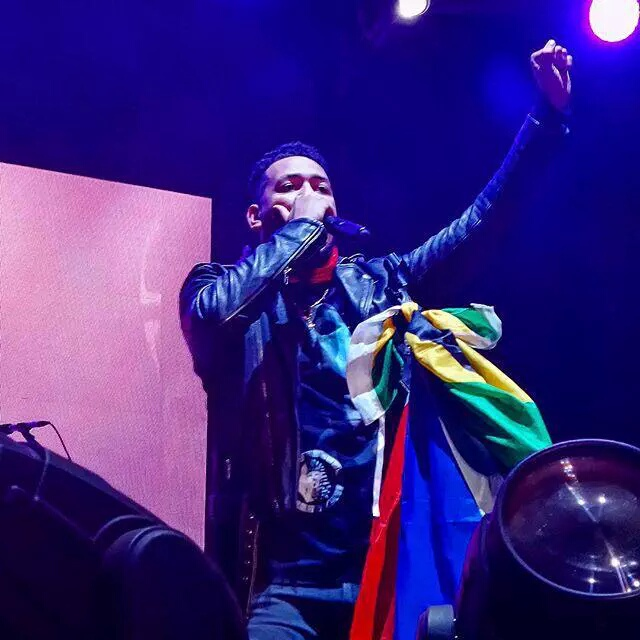
AKA performing in 2015

On 2 December 2016, Forbes released the lead single "The World is Yours" from his third studio album. With the delay of its release, Forbes collaborated with associated act Anatii in composing the album, Be Careful What You Wish For. The album was released on 28 July 2017, with a positive response from critics. It was supported by three singles: "10 Fingers", "Don't Forget To Pray" and "Holy Mountain".

=== 2018–2019: Touch My Blood ===
With the pre-release of "The World is Yours" in 2016, Forbes also pre-released songs including "Caiphus Song", "Star Signs" (featuring Stogie T) and "Sweet Fire" in supporting the release of his third album, Touch My Blood. Concerning the album's front cover, Forbes took to Twitter to announce a contest for graphic designers to design the artwork for his album, using his clear face portrait. As numerous entries were sent, Forbes chose the winner named Taonga, who received an internship with Beam Group. Fifteen days before its release, he released the controversial single "Beyonce" which was a dismissive song dedicated to his past partner Bonang Matheba.

Touch My Blood was then released on 15 June 2018 as it was set to release on 25 May 2018 but then delayed for taking time in building its promotion. The album was certified platinum then later certified double platinum by RiSA as for 2019. Touch My Blood's sixth single "Fela in Versace" featuring Kiddominant received higher commercial success compared to the other singles. The album features guest appearances from fellow South African artists including L-Tido, JR, Yanga Chief, Stogie T, Kwesta and Okmalumkoolkat, as well as Nigerian artist and producer Kiddominant.

On 8 April 2018, Forbes was featured on a WWE live event in Cape Town and Johannesburg, South Africa. In February 2019, he was the featured roastee in Comedy Central SA annual roast special.

In April 2020, Forbes alongside vodka brand Cruz launched a watermelon-flavoured drink with his initial on the bottles.

=== 2020–2023: Bhovamania, Mass Country ===
On 6 November 2021, AKA's Extended Play Bhovamania was released. The EP was supported by four singles: "Energy", "Python", "Monuments" and "Cross My Heart". At the tenth ceremony of the South African Hip Hop Awards, he received a nomination for Artist of the Decade.

In early September 2022, AKA announced plans for his fourth studio album Mass Country on Instagram. The Nasty C-assisted track "Lemons (Lemonade) " was released on 16 September 2022, as the album's lead single. The song was certified 4× Platinum by the Recording Industry of South Africa (RiSA).

The album was released on 24 February 2023. It reached Platinum in South Africa.

In July 2023, Sony Africa announced an upcoming Mass Country Deluxe edition, released date to be announced.

== Personal life ==
Forbes began dating producer DJ Zinhle at the end of 2014. After receiving several South African Hip Hop Awards accolades, Zinhle hinted at their relationship by tweeting "Congratulations to my winner". The couple have a daughter named Kairo Owethu Forbes, born in 2015. In August 2015, Forbes and Zinhle split after it was revealed that Forbes allegedly cheated on Zinhle with television presenter Bonang Matheba. Though Forbes and Matheba initially denied the allegations, they admitted to their relationship in 2016. Forbes and Matheba broke up in December 2017. However, Forbes and Zinhle got back together in late 2018, although later in 2019 they broke up again.

On 21 February 2021, Forbes posted a picture on Instagram announcing his engagement to girlfriend Nelli Tembe. On 11 April 2021, Tembe died after a fall from a hotel in Cape Town.

Following the death of Tembe, reports emerged that Forbes had been on drugs. He issued a public statement in response, saying he would not be drawn into exposing their troubles as a couple to defend himself against "one-sided views". The rapper's statement came in the wake of a News24 report, which claimed to have seen images where Forbes can be seen using his hands to violently break down a wooden door to enter the bedroom in their apartment in Bryanston, Johannesburg, where Tembe was hiding. The incident allegedly took place on 13 March 2021, almost a month before her death. During the Parliament ad hoc task in 2025, former minister of police Bheki Cele, alleged that police believe Tembe was murdered.

In July 2026 an inquest was set to begin at the Cape Town Magistrate Court into Tembe's death where six witneses are expected to testify. This follows News24 reconstruction of a video based on a CCTV footage including social media activities that tracked the couples movements before the suicide.

== Murder and investigation ==
On 10 February 2023 at 22:00 (SAST) local time, Forbes was scheduled to perform at the Yugo nightclub in Durban as part of his birthday celebration. That night, as he was standing outside a restaurant with friends, a gunman ran up to Forbes and fatally shot him in the head while his accomplice shot and killed his friend Tebello Motsoane, after which both men fled the scene on foot. Forbes and Motsoane were both pronounced dead at the scene.

Although two people were present during the assassination of AKA, six people in total were involved in the late rapper’s death. Police revealed that his death was the result of an organized hit. The person who orchestrated the murder followed AKA from the King Shaka International Airport to his hotel. Four vehicles, two gunmen, two stalkers, and a weapons dealer all contributed to the death of AKA and his friend Tebello “Tibz” Motsoane. The trial has been postponed to July 2026 after the judge scolded lawyers.

== Discography ==
Studio albums

- Altar Ego (2011)
- Levels (2014)
- Touch My Blood (2018)
- Mass Country (2023)

Collaborative albums

- Be Careful What You Wish For (with Anatii) (2017)
- You're Welcome (with Costa Tich) (2021)

Extended plays

- 24/7/366 E.P (2009)
- Bhovamania (2020)

== Awards and nominations ==
Year	Award ceremony	Prize	Recipient/nominated work	Result	Notes
2012	18th South African Music Awards	Best Male Artist	Altar Ego	Won	
2013	Channel O Africa Music Video Awards	Most Gifted Hip Hop	Himself	Nominated	
2014	African Muzik Magazine Awards	Best Male, Southern Africa	Himself	Nominated	
2014	African Muzik Magazine Awards	Best Rap Act	Himself	Nominated	
2014	MTV Africa Music Awards	Best Hip Hop	Himself	Nominated	
2014	Channel O Africa Music Video Awards	Most Gifted Hip Hop	Himself	Nominated	
2015	African Muzik Magazine Awards	Best Male Southern Africa		Won	
2015	African Muzik Magazine Awards	Best Collaboration		Won	
2015	MTV Africa Music Awards	Best Collaboration		Won	
2015	21st South African Music Awards	Best Male Artist	Levels	Won	
2015	Kora Awards	Best African Hip Hop		Nominated	
2015	BET Awards	Best International Act (Africa)		Nominated	
2015	MTV Europe Music Awards	Best African Act		Nominated	
2015	M.O.B.O. Awards	Best International Act (Africa)			
2015	4th South African Hip Hop Awards	Best Collaboration	AKA – Baddest (featuring Burna Boy, Khuli Chana and Yanga)	Nominated	
2015	4th South African Hip Hop Awards	Best Collaboration	Anatii – "The Saga" (featuring AKA)	Won	
2015	4th South African Hip Hop Awards	Most Valuable Artist	Levels (Gold album); Congratulate (Gold single); All Eyes on Me (Gold single); "Run Jozi (Godly)" (Gold single)	Won	
2015	4th South African Hip Hop Awards	Most Digital Sales		Won	
2015	4th South African Hip Hop Awards	Song of the Year	Anatii – The Saga (featuring AKA)	Won	
2015	4th South African Hip Hop Awards	Song of the Year	AKA – Baddest	Won	
2015	4th South African Hip Hop Awards	Video of the Year	AKA – All Eyes on Me	Nominated	
2015	4th South African Hip Hop Awards	Video of the Year	Anatii – The Saga (featuring AKA)	Won	
2015	4th South African Hip Hop Awards	Video of the Year	Da L.E.S – P.A.I.D (featuring AKA and Burna Boy)	Nominated	
2015	4th South African Hip Hop Awards	Video of the Year	AKA – Sim Dope	Nominated	
2016	15th Metro FM Music Awards	Best Collaboration	AKA – Baddest (featuring Burna Boy, Khuli Chana and Yanga)	Won	
2016	15th Metro FM Music Awards	Best Hit Single	AKA – Baddest (featuring Burna Boy, Khuli Chana and Yanga)	Won	
2016	15th Metro FM Music Awards	Best Remix	AKA – Baddest Remix (featuring Fifi Cooper, Rouge, Moozlie and Gigi Lamayne)	Nominated	
2016	22nd South African Music Awards	Best Collaboration	AKA – All Eyes on Me (featuring Redsan, Burna Boy and Stonebwoy)	Nominated	
2016	22nd South African Music Awards	Best Remix.	AKA – Baddest (featuring Fifi Cooper, Rouge, Moozlie and Gigi Lamayne)	Nominated	
2016	BET Awards 2016	Best International Act		Nominated	
2017	BET Awards 2017	Best International Act	Himself	Nominated	
2019	2019 Kids' Choice Awards	Favourite South African Star	Himself	Won	
2019	BET Awards 2019		Himself	Nominated	
2019	Namibia Annual Music Awards 2019	Pan African Artist of the Year		Won	
2020	26th South African Music Awards	Music Video of the Year	AKA — Jika ft YangaChief	Won	
2021	MTV Africa Music Awards 2021	Best Lockdown Performance	Himself		
2023	23rd Metro FM Music Awards	Best Hip Hop artist	AKA– MASS COUNTRY	Won	
2023	Content Creator Awards	Song of the Year	"Company" (AKA & Kiddo)	Nominated	
2023	Content Creator Awards	Song of the Year	"Lemons (Lemonade)" (featuring Nasty C)	Won	
2023	29th South African Music Awards	Best Male Artist	Mass Country	Won	
2023	29th South African Music Awards	Album of the Year	Mass Country	Nominated	
2023	29th South African Music Awards	Best Engineered Album	Mass Country (engineered and produced by Robin Kohl and Itu)	Won	
2023	29th South African Music Awards	Best Collaboration	"Lemons (Lemonade)" (featuring Nasty C)	Won	
2023	29th South African Music Awards	Best Collaboration	"Company" (featuring Kiddo)	Nominated	
2023	29th South African Music Awards	Best Produced Music Video	"Lemons (Lemonade)" (producer: Tebogo Mabaso; director: Nate Thomas)	Nominated	
2023	29th South African Music Awards	Best Hip Hop Album	Mass Country	Nominated	

== See also ==
- List of murdered hip-hop musicians
