= Tumi Molekane =

South African rapper and poet (born 1981)

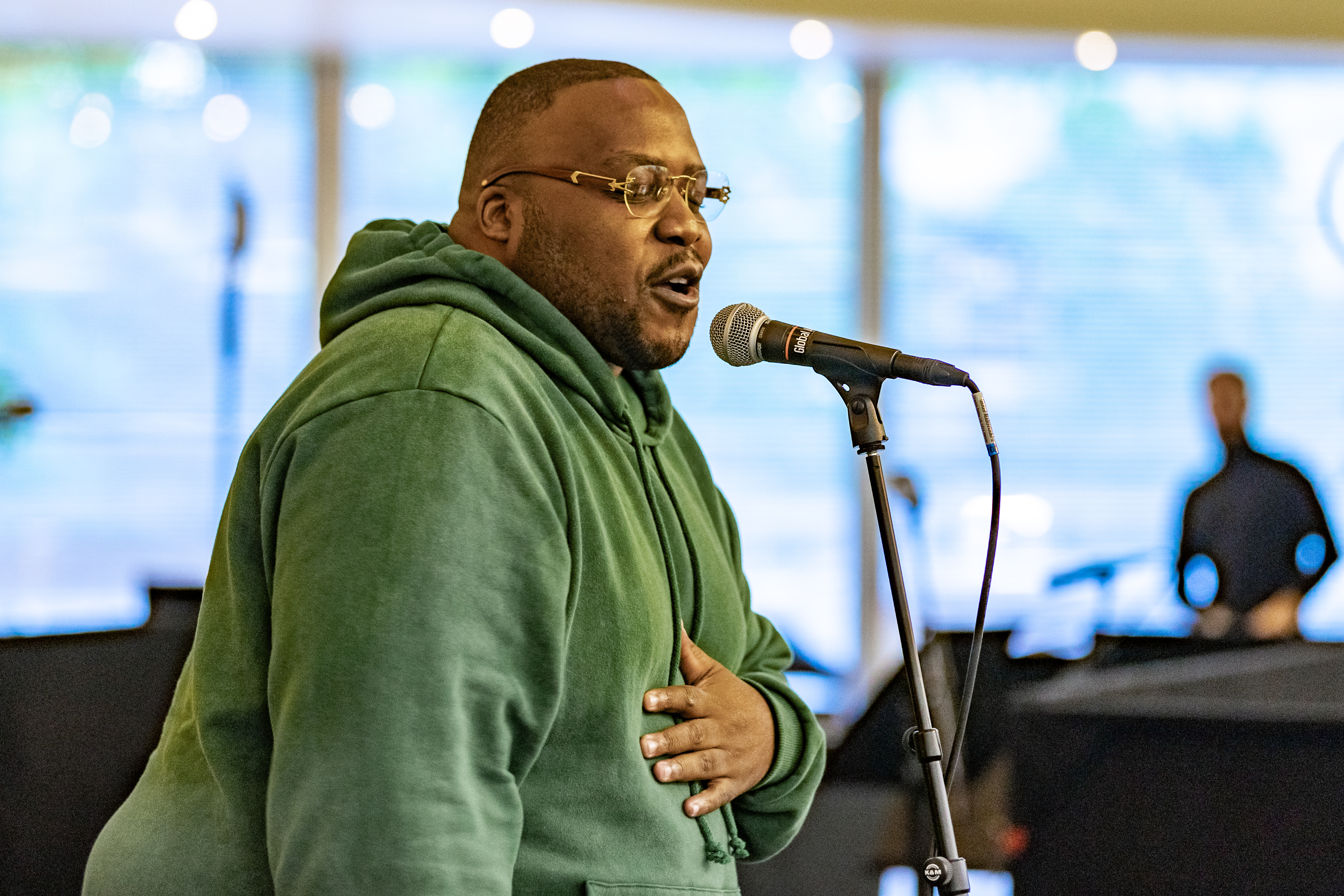
- Stogie T performing at Harare International Festival of the Arts 2012

Background information
- Also known as: The Poet MC; Stogie T
- Born: Boitumelo Molekane; 16 August 1981 (age 45); Tanzania
- Origin: Johannesburg, South Africa
- Citizenship: South Africa; Tanzania
- Genre: Hip hop
- Occupations: Rapper; poet; singer; songwriter
- Years active: 2005-present
- Labels: Def Jam Recordings Africa; Motif Records
- Website: tumipoetmc.com

Tumi Molekane (born 16 August 1981) is a Tanzanian-born South African rapper and poet. He was the lead vocalist of Tumi and the Volume, which disbanded in 2012. In 2016, Molekane relaunched himself as Stogie T.

== Background ==
Boitumelo Molekane's parents were South Africans living in Tanzania, where he was born. In 1992, Tumi Molekane repatriated, and moved to Soweto, South Africa.

== Career ==
Tumi was involved in the Dead Prez show around late in 2000 and also took part in the Black August tour to South Africa in 2001.

In 2005, Tumi recorded the song "Trade Winds" with Cincinnati, Ohio-based rapper Main Flow. In 2006, he published his debut album, Music from My Good Eye, through his record label Motif Records. The album was later listed as one of the greatest South African albums of all time.

Tumi and the Volume also comprised the members of the Mozambican band 340ml, (which disbanded in 2012).

He has performed with South African recording artists Blk Sonshine, Keorapetse Kgositsile, Watkin Tudor Jones, Lesego Rampolokeng, as well as other internationally renowned names including Saul Williams, Sarah Jones and Mutabaruka.

Tumi has also worked alongside Chinese Man, a French hip-hop crew, producing the album The Journey together in 2015.

In 2016, Molekane relaunched himself as Stogie T and released an eponymous album, "Stogie T.", featuring Da L.E.S, Lastee, Emtee, Nasty C, Nadia Nakai and Yanga. He released two singles from the album. The first single from the album, "Diamond Walk", featured rapper Nadia Nakai in the video. The second single from the album, "By Any Means", featured a hook and verses from Emtee and Yanga. In 2016, Molekane was also featured on Ghanaian rapper M.anifest's album Nowhere Cool.

In 2018, Stogie released Honey and Pain, which was the follow-up to his 2016 album.

On 8 October 2021, he signed a record deal with Def Jam Africa.

== Views ==
In his book Stealing Empire: P2P, Intellectual Property and Hip-hop Subversion (2008), Professor Adam Haupt of the University of Cape Town analyzed the lyrics Molekane wrote for the Tumi and the Volume song "76", as well as others. Among Haupt's arguments are that contemporary hip-hop music provides critical insights into the inheritance of violence in post-apartheid South Africa.

Haupt contends that, despite commercial and often sexist imperatives in mainstream hip-hop music, South Africa has produced a number of socially conscious hip-hop artists, who are reluctant to compromise their art and political views.

In 2022, Molekane performed at a World Intellectual Property Day event at the headquarters of the World Intellectual Property Organization in Geneva, Switzerland.

In an interview with WIPO Magazine, Molekane said: "I tell every 18-year-old who wants to rap that if they spend just one hour understanding what music publishing is, what IP is, what royalties are, and what their rights are, they will do more for their music than the three hours they spend on YouTube figuring out how to mix a new drum pattern. The entry barrier to music is virtually nonexistent now because of technology. That makes musicians vulnerable and means they need to be IP savvy."

In sharing his views on how musicians can monetize their work, Molekaneaid "streaming is like a business card; it's a way to get people familiar with your music while you take advantage of other channels to make money."
