= MTV Base: SA's Hottest MCs =

MTV Base: SA's Hottest MCs is an annual segment that has aired on MTV Base at the end of every year since 2014. The segment consists of a panel of judges who are South African hip hop performers or personalities associated with the South African hip hop genre. The finalists of the list are judged based on impact, lyrics, sales, buzz, style and intangibles.

== 2014 ==
The inaugural edition of the Hottest MCs list was revealed at a two day event on 19–20 November 2014, hosted by Sizwe Dlomo.

1. K.O
2. Cassper Nyovest
3. AKA
4. Khuli Chana
5. Riky Rick
6. Reason
7. Kid X
8. Da L.E.S
9. Kwesta
10. Maggz

== 2015 ==
The 2015 list was revealed on 26–27 November 2015.

1. Cassper Nyovest
2. AKA
3. K.O
4. Riky Rick
5. Okmalumkoolkat
6. Kwesta
7. Khuli Chana
8. Kid X
9. iFani
10. L-Tido

== 2016 ==
The 2016 list was revealed at a two-day event airing 1–2 December 2016.

1. Cassper Nyovest
2. Emtee
3. Nasty C
4. Kwesta
5. AKA
6. Riky Rick
7. Fifi Cooper
8. A-Reece
9. Okmalumkoolkat
10. Gigi LaMayne

== 2017 ==
The 2017 list was announced at a two-day event on 30 November-1 December 2017.

1. Kwesta
2. Cassper Nyovest
3. AKA
4. Nasty C
5. Emtee
6. Shane Eagle
7. Riky Rick
8. Okmalumkoolkat
9. A-Reece
10. YoungstaCPT
11. MrNytmares

== 2018 ==
The 2018 list was announced 6 December 2018.

1. Kwesta
2. AKA
3. Nasty C
4. Cassper Nyovest
5. Rouge
6. Shane Eagle
7. Anatii
8. Riky Rick
9. Moozlie
10. Nadia Nakai

== 2019 ==
The 2019 list was announced on 11–12 December 2019.

1. Nasty C
2. Sho Madjozi
3. Yanga Chief
4. AKA
5. YoungstaCPT
6. Kwesta
7. Shane Eagle
8. K.O and Riky Rick
9. Nadia Nakai
10. Boity

== 2020 ==
The 2020 list was announced on 3–4 December 2020 in an event hosted by Ms Cosmo.

1. Focalistic
2. Yanga Chief
3. Nasty C
4. Cassper Nyovest
5. Big Zulu
6. YoungstaCPT
7. Busiswa
8. Costa Titch
9. Riky Rick
10. K.O

== 2023 ==
The 2023 list was announced on 3–4 December 2023 in an event hosted by Tshego Koke.

1. Nasty C
2. JAYIE KLOIE
3. Bravo le Roux
4. Blxckie
5. A-Reece
6. K.O
7. AKA
8. Lucas Raps
9. Priddy Ugly
10. Dee Koala
