= Yanga Chief =

South African musician

Yanga
- Born: Yanga Ntshakaza; 17 October 1987 (age 38); Mthata, Eastern Cape
- Education: University of Johannesburg
- Occupations: Record producer; Rapper; Singer; Songwriter
- Musical career
- Genres: Hip Hop; Pop; Trap
- Labels: Fresh 2 Def (former); Sony Music Africa; Young Legend Music

Yanga Ntshakaza (born 17 October 1987), professionally known as Yanga Chief (or mononymously as Yanga) is a South African rapper, record producer and singer-songwriter. Born in Mthatha and raised in Queenstown, Yanga studied film studies at University of Johannesburg.

== Career ==
In late 2000s, Yanga was a videographer for Buttabing Entertainment. In 2016, he was featured on AKA's "Dreamwork" which was certified 5× diamond, and he co-written Kwesta's song featuring Thabsie "Ngiyaz'fela Ngawe" released in February 26, 2016. Yanga wrote and provided vocals for AKA’s song "Jika" released in 2018. In October 2018, his single "Utatakho" was released. The song peak number one on Metro FM Top 40 charts and was certified gold in South Africa selling over 10 000 units. In 2019 "Utatakho" won Song of the Year at the South African Hip Hop Awards. Yanga made "Utatakho Remix" the song features the late South African rappers Riky Rick, Dee Koala and Boity. Yanga ranked number 3 on MTV Base: SA's Hottest MCs 2019. In October 2019, his extended play (EP) Becoming a Pop Star was released. Becoming a Pop Star won South African Music Award for Best Hip Hop Album in 2021.

Yanga began to work on his debut in 2017. On October 16, 2020, album's pre-add were made available.

On November 27, 2020, his debut studio album Pop Star was released in South Africa. The album received positive reviews from music critics.

He teamed up with Blxckie and 25K on single "Ntoni Na", which music video premiered on MTV Base on the 31st of August 2021. In 2022 he made a single called "Benjamins" where he features Emtee and Henny Belit.

His extended play Imvelaphi, was released on May 31, 2024. It was supported by one single "Mbali Yam".

His second studio album Lord Faku – The Life Of A Dyan was released on February 21, 2025. The song "What If? Mngani" peaked No. 1 on the SA Spotify Daily Charts and reached No. 1 on Local Streaming Charts Top 10.

== Discography ==
=== Studio albums ===
- Pop Star (2020)
- Lord Faku – The Life of a Dyan (2025)

== Other charted and certified songs ==
List of other charted songs, with selected chart positions and certifications, showing year released and album name
Title	Year	Peak chart positions	Certifications	Album
Title	Year	ZA	Certifications	Album
"What If? Mngani"	2025	1	RiSA: Platinum	Lord Faku – The Life of a Dyan
"—" denotes a recording that did not chart or was not released in that territory.

== Awards and nominations ==
Year	Award ceremony	Category	Recipient/Nominated work	Results	Ref.
2016	South African Hip Hop Awards	Best Collabo	"Dreamwork"	Nominated	
2019	South African Hip Hop Awards	Song of the Year	"Utatakho"	Won	
2020	South African Hip Hop Awards	Mixtape of the Year	Becoming a Pop Star	Won	
2020	South African Hip Hop Awards	Song of the Year	"Utatakho Remix"	Nominated	
2020	South African Hip Hop Awards	Best Collaboration	"Utatakho Remix"	Nominated	
2020	South African Hip Hop Awards	Best Remix	"Utatakho Remix"	Nominated	
2020	South African Music Awards	Remix of the Year	"Utatakho Remix"	Nominated	
2020	South African Music Awards	Best Hip Hop Album	Becoming a Pop Star	Won	
2020	South African Music Awards	Best Music Video of the Year	"Jika"	Won	
2020	South African Music Awards	Record of the Year	"Jika"	Nominated	
2021	South African Music Awards	Best Hip Hop Album	Pop Star	Nominated	
2022	Global Music Awards Africa	Rapper of the Year	Himself	Nominated	
