= Utatakho =

2019 song by Yanga Chief

Single by Yanga Chief

from the album Becoming a Pop Star
- Released: April 19, 2019
- Genre: Hip-hop
- Length: 3:47
- Label: Sony
- Songwriter: Yanga Ntshakaza
- Producers: Yanga Ntshakaza; Chibuzor Ugwu

"Utatakho" is a single by South African singer-songwriter and videographer Yanga Chief from his debut extended play Becoming a Pop Star (2019), released on 5 April 2019 through Sony Music Entertainment Africa under exclusive license from Young Legend Music, it was certified Platinum by the Recording Industry of South Africa (RiSA).

== Commercial performance ==
The single peaked at number one on the Metro FM Top 40 Chats, in 2020 it was certified Gold in South Africa after selling over 10,000 units, and later on 12 April 2023 it was certified Platinum.

== Accolades ==
Year	Award ceremony	Category	Recipient/Nominated work	Results	Ref.
2019	South African Hip Hop Awards	Song of the Year	"Utatakho"	Won	
2020	South African Hip Hop Awards	Song of the Year	"Utatakho Remix"	Nominated	
2020	South African Hip Hop Awards	Best Collaboration	"Utatakho Remix"	Nominated	
2020	South African Hip Hop Awards	Best Remix	"Utatakho Remix"	Nominated	
2020	South African Music Awards	Remix of the Year	"Utatakho Remix"	Nominated	
