= 27th Annual South African Music Awards =

2021 award ceremony

27th South African Music Awards
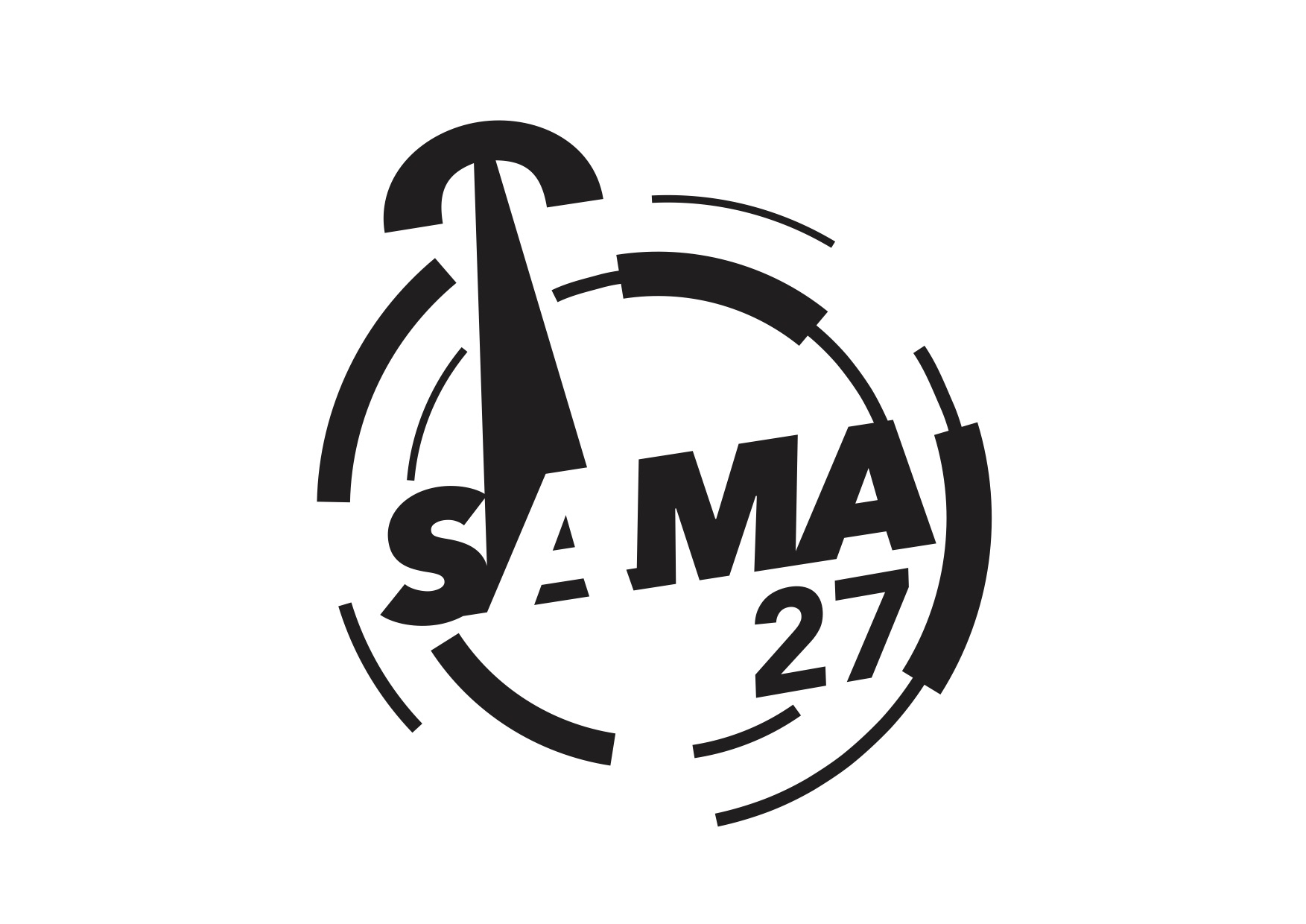
- Date: 31 July 2021
- Location: Virtual event, multiple venues
- Country: South Africa
- Hosted by: Bontle Modiselle; Lawrence Maleka
- Motto: Redefine, Invent, Imagine

Highlights
- Most wins: Kabza De Small (4)
- Most nominations: Kabza De Small (6)

Television/radio coverage
- Network: SABC1

The 27th Annual South African Music Awards were the 27th edition of the South African Music Awards. The award show was broadcast live on SABC1 on 31 July 2021, and was held virtually due to the effects of COVID-19 lockdowns.

The nominees were announced on 19 May 2021. Kabza de Small received the most nominations with six, ahead of Sun-El Musician with five nominations. The 27th annual SAMAs introduced new categories, introducing best amapiano, gqom and kwaito albums as their own categories.

On 17 July 2021, it was announced that television personalities Bontle Modiselle and Lawrence Maleka were to be the hosts of the ceremony.

== Performers ==
The list of performers was announced on July 28.

Artist(s)	Song(s)
Sjava	"Umcebo"
Boity	"Bakae"
Big Zulu (featuring Riky Rick and Intaba Yase Dubai)	"Mali Eningi"
Bucy Radebe	
Azana	
Langa Mavuso	
Buhlebendalo	
Blaq Diamond	

== Winners and nominees ==
Nominees are as listed below. Winners are in bold.

Album of the year	Female Artist of the Year	Male Artist of the Year	
'Once Upon A Time in Lockdown – Kabza De Small & DJ Maphorisa (Scorpion Kings); Persistence – Bongo Riot; The Healers: The Last Chapter – Black Motion; I Am The King of Amapiano: Sweet & Dust – Kabza De Small; Back to Love – Junior Taurus	**Sho Madjozi – What a Life**; Reign Africa – On the Frontline; Bucy Radebe – Spiritual Encounter; Nomcebo Zikode – Xola Moya Wam’; HLE – Your Kingdom on Earth	**Kabza De Small – I Am the King of Amapiano: Sweet & Dust**; Sun-El Musician – To The World & Beyond; Bongo Riot – Persistence; Oscar Mbo – For the Groovists; Junior Taurus – Back to Love	
Newcomer of the Year	Duo/Group of the Year	Best Rock Album	Best Pop Album
**Bucy Radebe – Spiritual Encounter**; Xolly Mncwango – Jesus is Enough; Reign Africa – On the Frontline; BandaBanda & The Crocodiles – Africado; Azana – Ingoma	**Kabza De Small & DJ Maphorisa (Scorpion Kings) – Once Upon A Time in Lockdown**; Reece Madlisa & Zuma – Ama Roto EP; MFR Souls – Musical Kings; Mas Musiq & Aymos – Shonamalanga; Mi Casa – We Made It	**Orange Sunshine – Yum Yuck**; Chrome Neon Jesus – Ethyl Ether; Here’s to the Now – Nathan Smith; The Devils Cattle – Ruff Majik; Nothing’s Gonna Change – Oooth	**Tribes & Angels – Locnville**; 11:11 – Rowlene; I Don’t Sleep – Jethro Tait; Sugar – Mark Stent; She – Amy Lilley
Best Pop Album	Best Afro Pop Album	Best R&B/Soul Album	Best Adult Contemporary Album
**Twintig20 – Brendan Peyper**; 2021 – Die Heuwels Fantasties; Die Toekoms is Synth – Synth Peter; Gewigloos – Juan Boucher; Gemaklik Verlore – Christa Visser	**Ngumama – Vusi Nova**; Ingoma – Azana; Molimo – Manu Worldstar; The Voice of Africa – Kelly Khumalo; Tugela Fairy: Made of Stars – Simmy	**Uhambo – Soul Kulture**; A Force To Be Reckoned With – Thando; LANGA – Langa Mavuso; Sindisiwe – LaSauce; Small World – Ricky Tyler	**Beyele - The Journey Continues – Max – Hoba**; Umsebenzi – Sjava; Isambulo – 1020 Cartel Artists; Bamako – Simphiwe Dana; Buhlebendalo – Chosi
Best Classical Album/Instrumental Album	Best Contemporary Music Album	Best Hip Hop Album	Best Reggae Album
**We’ve Known All Times – Wouter Kellerman**; Live in Cape Town – Guy Buttery & Derek Gripper; Imagine – Charles du Plessis Trio; Live in Lisbon – Nibs van der Spuy and Guy Buttery; Tek’o – CH2	**Herverbeel – Die Heuwels Fantasties**; Wandel in my Woning – Refentse; Net Geleen – Bernice West; Monumentaal – Ruhan Du Toit; Spontaan – Riaan Benadê	**Zulu Man with Some Power** **– Nasty C**; 4436 – Boity; Nadia Naked II – Nadia Nakai; POPSTAR – Yanga Chief; Zakwe & Duncan – Zakwe & Duncan	**Persistence – Bongo Riot**; The Journey – Ras Canly; My Music – Freeky; On the Frontline – Reign Africa; Empathy Riddim – Lavoro Duro
Remix of the Year	Best Collaboration	Best Dance Album	Best Kwaito
**"Yehla Moya" – Da Capo**; "Jerusalema" – Kid Fonque; "Ndanele" – Dwson; "Sala Nabani" – Sun-El Musician, Claudio & Kenza; "Speak Lord" – Sculptured Music	**"Mali Eningi" – Big Zulu featuring Riky Rick & Intaba Yase Dubai**; "Uthando" – Darque featuring Zakes Bantwini; "Ek Like Hoe Jy Dans" – Chê featuring Snotkop; "Senzeni" – Mthandazo Gatya featuring Comado & DJ Manzo SA; "Yehla Moya" – Da Capo & Nduduzo Makhathini featuring Omagugu	**The Healers: The Last Chapter – Black Motion**; To The World & Beyond – Sun-El Musician; For The Goovists – Oscar Mbo; Xola Moya Wam’ – Nomcebo Zikode; We Made It – Mi Casa	**Ama Roto EP – Reece Madlisa & Zuma**; Sgubhu OverDoze – Lvovo & Danger; Endaweni – Darkie Fiction; Don’t Lose Hope – Sukiri Papa; Bhut’Madlisa – Mampintsha
Best Amapiano Album	Best Gqom Album	Best Engineered Album of the Year	Best Produced Music Video
**Once Upon A Time In Lockdown – Kabza De Small & DJ Maphorisa (Scorpion Kings)**; Musical Kings – MFR Souls; Back to Love – Junior Taurus; I Am The King of Amapiano: Sweet & Dust – Kabza De Small; Shonamalanga – Mas Musiq & Aymos	**InzaloYekwaito – Zinaro**; We Don’t Play the Same Gqom – Que; Make Cape Town Great Again – Mshayi & Mr Thela; Isiqalo – DragerNation; Idando Kazi – Babes Wodumo	**Inganekwane by Zoë Modiga – Papi Diretsi & Songo Oyama**; Swingle Bells by Jonathan Roxmouth – Adam Howard; Goodluck Upclose by Goodluck – Murray Anderson & Andrew Rawborn; Isambulo by 1020 Cartel Artists – Mfanafuthi Ruff; The Second Coming by Kid Tini – James Smals, Kitie, Ron Epidemic & Tweezy	**"Hosh" by Prince Kaybee featuring Sir Trill – Ofentse**; "Where is the DJ" by Malumz on Decks featuring Khanyisa – Oscar Nyathi; "Qhawe – Made to Create" by Toya Delazy – Kyle Lewis & Vjorn Tucker; "Mamela" by Mi Casa – Katya Abedian; "Lucky Star" by K.O – Adam Zackon & Dale Fortune
Best Live Audio Visual Recording	Best Alternative Music Album	Best African Indigenous Faith Album	Best Traditional Faith Music Album
**A Journey to the World & Beyond – Sun-El Musician**; Your Kingdom on Earth – HLE; The Throne (Live Edition) – Presss; Spiritual Encounter – Bucy Radebe; My Hart Klop Refentse – Refentse	**iimini – Bongeziwe Mabandla**; Mania/Post Mania – Yellow House; Hot Mess – Evert Snyman; Filth and Wisdom – The Medicine Dolls; Ebusuku – Th&o	**Izwi Lakho – Mandlethu Gospel Singers**; Makhosi Akithi – Vuma Zion; Katlehong Gospel Choir Artist Development – Katlehong Gospel Choir Artist Development; Sithembe Wena Nkosi – JTG Gospel Choir; Enyokumkhonza – Enyonini Mission Ministries	**Spiritual Encounter – Bucy Radebe**; Project 17 – Chapter 2 – Worship House; Buya Nkosi – Thinah Zungu; Wathi Eloyi Eloyi – Sipho Makhabane; Izulu – Sneziey
Best Contemporary Faith Music Album	Best Maskandi Album	Rest of Africa Artist	Best Traditional Album
**Your Kingdom on Earth – HLE**; Devotion – Nqubeko Mbatha; Face 2 Face – Collen Maluleke; Jesus is Enough – Xolly Mncwango; The Promised Revival Part One – Tshwane Gospel Choir	**Imfene Kamakhelwane – Abafana Baka Mgqumeni**; Amagupta – iChwane Lebhaca; Ziyangiluma Izinja – Phuzekhemisi; Iqatha Eliziqobayo – Thokozani Langa; Banathi Shaqa – Imithente	**Songs in the Key of Love – Berita**; Unity Album – Buffalo Souljah; A Better Time – Davido; Made in Lagos – Wizkid; Midnight Train – Sauti Sol	**What a Life – Sho Madjozi**; Love and War – Henny C; Angeke Bakuthande Boke – Smangele; Shebeen Queen – Vusi Mahlasela; Ndavhuko – Vendaboy Poe

Artist Of The Year Top 5 1. Makhadzi 2. Ethyl Ether 3. Blaq Diamond 4. Reece Madlisa and Zuma 5. HLE

CAPASSO Most Streamed Song of The Year You're the One - Elaine

Best Adult Contemporary Album:

Winner: Ndlovu Youth Choir - Rise

Artist Of The Year Top 3 1. HLE 2. Makhadzi 3. Blaq Diamond

Best Jazz Album:

Winner: Modes of Communication: Letters from the Underworlds - Nduduzo Makhathini Best Produced Album:

Winner: Sjava - Umsebenzi (Delaydem, Ruff Nkosi, Webmoms, Zadok & Vuyo Manyike)

Music Video of the Year:

- MFR Souls - Amanikiniki ft. Major League DJz, Kamo Mphela, Bontle Smith
- Prince Kaybee - uWrongo ft. Black Motion, Shimza, Ami Faku
- Sha Sha - Tender Love ft. DJ Maphorisa & Kabza De Small
- Miss Pru - Price To Pay ft. Blaq Diamond, Malome Vector
- Master KG - Jerusalema ft. Nomcebo Zikode
- Ayanda Jiya - Lover 4 Life ft. Stogie T (Music Video)
- Malome Vector - Dumelang ft. Blaq Diamond (Music Video)
- Semi Tee - Gabadiya ft. Kammu Dee, Miano (Official Video)
- Aubrey Qwana - Molo (Official Music Video) #REMASTEREDINHD
- Nasty C - There They Go
- Kwesta - Njandini
- Elaine - You're the One (Official Music Video) REMASTERED
- DJ Maphorisa, Kabza De Small - Lorch ft. Semi Tee, Miano, Kammu Dee
- TNS, Skillz - Ayabonga ft. LeSoul (Official Music Video) HD
- Sphectacula, DJ Naves - Okokoko ft. Thebe, Unathi (Video)
- Nasty C - Eazy (Official Music Video) #REMASTEREDINHD
- Focalistic - Ke Star featuring Vigro Deep (Official Video)
- Rouge - One By One ft. AKA
- Azana - Your Love (Official Music Video) REMASTERED
- Shane Eagle - Paris ft. Nasty C (Music Video)

Winner:

- Miss Pru - Price to Pay ft. Blaq Diamond, Malome Vector

Record of the Year:

- Master KG - Jerusalema ft. Nomcebo Zikode
- Elaine - You're the One
- Kabza De Small, DJ Maphorisa - eMcimbini (Audio)
- Nomcebo Zikode - Xola Moya Wam' ft. Master KG
- Blaq Diamond - Love Letter (Official Audio) 2020
- Aubrey Qwana - Molo (Official Audio) 2020 Lyrics On Screen
- Sun-El Musician - Ubomi Abumanga ft. Msaki (Audio)
- Prince Kaybee, Black Motion, Shimza, Ami Faku - uWrongo
- Kelly Khumalo - Empini (Official Audio) 2020 Lyrics
- MFR Souls - Amanikiniki ft. Major League DJz, Kamo Mphela, Bontle Smith
- Sha Sha - Tender Love ft. DJ Maphorisa, Kabza De Small
- Miss Pru - Price To Pay ft. Blaq Diamond, Malome Vector
- TNS - Umona ft. Mpumi (Official Audio) 2019 Lyric Video
- Matthew Mole - Keep It Together (Official Audio) 2020 Lyric
- Simmy - Ngihamba Nawe ft. Sino Msolo (Official Audio) 2021
- Blaq Diamond - SummerYoMuthi (Official Audio) 2020
- MFR Souls - Love You Tonight ft. Kabza De Small, DJ Maphorisa, Sha Sha
- Jethro Tait - Sad
- Shekhinah - Fixate ft. Bey T (Audio)
- Azana - Your Love (Official Audio)

Winner:

- Matthew Mole - Keep It Together (Official Audio) 2020 Lyric

Artist of the Year:

Winner:

- Blaq Diamond

== Special awards ==
International Achievement Award

- Master KG

Lifetime Achievement Award

- Lebo M
- Dr Lindelani Mkhize
- PJ Powers

=== Best singer in intertainment industry ===
Sir trill

Best Selling Artist

- Mlindo the Vocalist - Emakhaya

SAMRO HIGHEST AIRPLAY AWARD

- Kgaugelo Moagi (Master KG) and Nomcebo Zikode – Jerusalema
