= Becoming a Pop Star =

EP by Yanga Chief
- Released: 19 October 2019
- Genre: Hip hop
- Length: 32:05
- Language: Xhosa; Sesotho; English
- Label: Sony Music Entertainment Africa; Young Legend Music
- Producer: Chibuzor Ugwu; Yanga Ntshakaza; Mnqobi Nxumalo; Neo Makwa

Yanga Chief chronology
Becoming a Pop Star (2019)	Pop Star (2020)

Singles from Becoming a Pop Star
- 1. "Utatakho" Released: 19 April 2021; 2. "200" Released: 11 October 2021

Becoming a Pop Star (acronymed BAPS) is the debut extended play (EP) by South African singer-songwriter and rapper Yanga Chief released on 18 October 2019. The release was led by singles "200" and "Utatakho", the prior and latter certified Gold and Platinum respectively by the Recording Industry of South Africa (RiSA).

== Track listing ==
Becoming a Pop Star track listing
No.	Title	Writer(s)	Producer(s)	Length
1.	"Nangomso"	Yanga Ntshakaza; Majin	Chibuzor Ugwu	3:15
2.	"200"	Yanga Ntshakaza; Lucid Soundz	Chibuzor Ugwu	3:54
3.	"Wys"	Yanga Ntshakaza; Playboy	Chibuzor Ugwu	1:36
4.	"Lovely" (featuring Makwa)	Yanga Ntshakaza; Neo Makwa	Chibuzor Ugwu	4:06
5.	"Jampas"	Yanga Ntshakaza; Mnqobi Nxumalo	Chibuzor Ugwu	3:16
6.	"Soweto"	Yanga Ntshakaza; Lindokuhle Motha	Chibuzor Ugwu	4:51
7.	"Hard" (featuring AKA)	Yanga Ntshakaza; Kiernan Forbes	Chibuzor Ugwu	3:29
8.	"Utatakho"	Yanga Ntshakaza	Yanga Ntshakaza; Chibuzor Ugwu	3:47
9.	"Utatakho Remix" (featuring Boity, Dee Koala and Riky Rick)	Yanga Ntshakaza; Boitumelo Thulo; Odwa Stuma; Rikhado Makhado	Chibuzor Ugwu	3:47
Total length:				32:05

== Awards and nominations ==
Awards and nominations for Becoming a Pop Star
Year	Award ceremony	Category	Recipient/Nominated work	Results	Ref.
2020	South African Music Awards	Best Hip Hop Album	Becoming a Pop Star	Won	
2020	South African Hip Hop Awards	Mixtape of the Year	Becoming a Pop Star	Won	
