= Ms Cosmo =

South African record producer

- Born: Nonqaba Nozuko Rwaxa; 20 April 1988 (age 38); Soweto, South Africa
- Origin: Gauteng, South Africa
- Genres: Hip hop
- Occupations: DJ; Radio personality; Podcaster; MC; Music producer; Singer
- Years active: 2011–present

Nonqaba Nozuko Rwaxa (born 20 April 1988), better known as Ms Cosmo, is a South African DJ, radio personality, MC, podcaster, music producer and singer . She is known for being the host of The Trap House and The Stir Up on 5FM. She was the first female DJ to join Channel O’s DJ music show, The Bassment.

== Early life ==
MS Cosmo was born in Diepkloof, Soweto, where she lived the first six years of her life before her family moved to the northern suburbs of Johannesburg. She fell in love with hip-hop from a very young age, being influenced by her cousin.

== Education ==
She attended Bryanston Primary School and Bryanston High School. She graduated at the University of Johannesburg with a degree in BCom Finance and Investment Management.

== Career ==
After graduating, she worked at a bank as a commercial property finance consultant, but her interest in music led her to enroll at FUSE Academy, which was founded for aspiring DJ's, and has since opened up for Kanye West, Chris Brown, 2 Chainz, Kendrick Lamar and Chance The Rapper during their South African tours.

In 2012, she joined YFM as a YTKO DJ doing weekly live mixes and became the first and only female DJ to join Channel O’s DJ music show the "Bassment".

In 2013, she joined 5FM as a presenter for the weekly hip hop show The Stir Up.

In 2017, she released her first single Connect which featured Nasty C, Rouge and Kwesta which ranked No. 1 on the 5FM & YFM Charts.

In July 2020, she launched her online podcast called "SHE Social Podcast" which promotes women in the arts industry from fashion to music and art. Later that year she released her single Baningi which featured Sho Madjozi, Dee Koala, and Nelisiwe Sibiya. She also released her single Bhuti which featured Boity and Moonchild Sanelly.

== Awards and nominations ==
Year	Award ceremony	Prize	Result
2013	South African Hip Hop Awards	Best Radio Show	Won
2017	Liberty Radio Awards	Best Traffic Presenter	Won
2018	DStv Mzansi Viewers' Choice Awards	Favorite DJ	Nominated
2019	South African Hip Hop Awards	DJ of the Year	Nominated
2020	South African Hip Hop Awards	DJ of the Year	Nominated
2021	South African Hip Hop Awards	DJ of the Year	Won
