= South African Hip Hop Awards 2021 =

2021 Award show

- Date: 10 December 2021
- Country: South Africa
- Hosted by: Sol Phenduka
- Motto: The Manifesto

Highlights
- Most wins: Big Zulu (7)
- Most nominations: Big Zulu (10)
- Website: www.sahiphopawards.com

Television/radio coverage
- Network: SABC 1

The 2021 South African Hip Hop Awards took place on 10 December 2021 and were the 10th edition of the South African Hip Hop Awards. The ceremony celebrates achievements in entertainment and music.

The nominees were announced on 2 November 2021 on official South African Hip Hop Awards social media pages. Big Zulu lead the nominations this year with a total of 10. Boity Thulo follows with 5 nominations.

== Winners and nominees ==
The following is a list of winners and nominees. The winners are in Bold and were announced on 10 December 2021 at the ceremony.

Song of the Year	Album of the year
**Big Zulu featuring Riky Rick, Intaba, Yase Dubai - "Mali Enigi"**; Costa Ticth featuring Riky Rick & DJ Maphorisa - "Areyeng"; Dr Peppa featuring Blxckie & Aux Cable - "Mntase"; Blxckie featuring Nasty C - Ye x4; Big Zulu featuring Mduduzi Ncube - "Inhlupheko"; Khuli Chana featuring Tyler ICU & Stino Le Thwenny - "Buyile"; DJ Mr X featuring K.O, Cassper Nyovest, Loki Roiii - "Asambe"; K.O - "Khova"; Big Zulu featuring Lwah Ndlunkulu - "Umuzi ESandton"; Riky Rick featuring Focalistic, Tyler ICU - "Ungazincishi"	**Big Zulu - Ichwane Lenyoka**; 25K - Pheli Makaveli; Costa titch - Made in Africa; Blxckie - b4Now; Emtee - Logan
Mixtape of the year	Best Collabo
**A-Reece - "Today's Tragedy, Tomorrow's Memory: The Mixtape"**; Boity - "4436"; AKA - "Bhovamania"; Maglera Doe Boy - "2 player: The Digital Score"; Dj Switch & Bravo leRoux - "The Rise of Istrato"	**Big Zulu featuring Riky Rick, Intaba Yase Dubai - "Mali Enigi"**; Big Zulu featuring Mduduzi Ncube - "Inhlupheko"; Big Zulu featuring Lwah Ndlunkulu - Umuzi eSandton; Dr Peppa featuring Blxckie, Aux Cable - "Mntase"; Blxckie featuring Nasty C - "Ye x4"; Dj Mr X featuring K.O, Cassper Nyovest, Loki, Roiii - "Asambe"; 25K ft A-Reece - "Hustlers Prayer"; Khuli Chana featuring Tyler ICU & Stino Le Thwenny - "Buyile"; Riky Rick featuring Focalistic, Tyler ICU - "Unngazuncishi"; Zakwe & Duncan featuring Assessa & Just Bheki - "AMA Level"
Best Male	Best Female
**Big Zulu**; 25K; Costa Titch; Blxckie; Emtee	**Boity**; Gigi Lamayne; Hanna; Moozlie; Faith K
DJ of the year	Producer of the year
**Ms Cosmo**; DJ Speedsta; Courtnae Paul; DJ PH; Dj Venom	**Zoocci Coke Dope**; MustbeDubz; Lunatik; Herc Cut the Light; Gobi Beast
Lyricist of the year	Fresheman of the year
**A-Reece**; Landmarq; Priddy Ugly; YoungstaCPT; PdotO	**Blxckie**; Boity; 25K; Costa Titch; Maglera Doe Boy
MVP/Hustler of the year	Best video
**Riky Rick**; Big Zulu; Boity; Nasty C; DJ PH	**Big Zulu - "Mali Eningi" Directed by (Ofentse Mwase Films)**; 25K featuring A-Reece - "Hustlers Prayer" Directed by (Ayanda Mayo Sidibe); A-Reece featuring Wordz - "The 5 Year Plan" Directed by (SXMZX for Poison Cure Productions); Miss Pru Dj - "Chillisi" Directed by (Ambitiouz Visuals); Nasty C featuring Ari Lennox - "Black & white" Directed by (Kyle White)
Best local brand	Best International brand
**SkhandaWorld**; Y?GEN; Butanwear	**Sportscene**; Reebok; Castle Lite; Russian Bear Vodka; Old Mutual (AMP Studios)
Best remix	Best radio show
**Stino Le Thwenny featuring K.O, Major League Djz, Khuli Chana - "Mshimane 2.0"**; Boity featuring 25K, William Last KRM, Towdee Mac, Venom - "018's Finest (Remix)"; Flash Ikumkani featuring Bravo Le Roux & Soul T - "Mhluzi (Remix)"; Rouge featuring Costa Titch, Phatom steeze, Tumi Tladi, Hanna & Blxckie - "popular (Remix)"; Maglera Doe Boy featuring Dj Speedsta, Emtee, Gemini Major & Priddy Ugly - "Bodega (Remix)"	**You FM - "Hip Hop With Towdeemac"**; Ligwalagwala FM - "The Hip Hop Culture"; Ukhozi FM - "Ziyawa Hip Hop"; Good Hope FM - "the Ready D Show"; Metro FM - "Absolute Hip Hop"; Tru FM - "The Urban Exchange"; Motsweding FM - "FM Rap Saga"; Gagazi FM - "The Fresh Cut"; YFM - "Three Waywith DJ Zan D, OG Samke & Fifla"; 5FM - "The Stir Up"
Artist of The Decade	Best international act
**Cassper Nyovest**; Khuli Chana; K.O; Kwesta; Riky Rick; AKA; Zakwe; Gigi Lamayne; Emtee; Da L.E.S; Nadia Nakai; Nasty C; Reason; Stogie T; A-Reece; Youngsta CPT	**William Last KRM** - Botswana; Sarkodie - Ghana; Little Simz - UK; Ye - USA; Drake - Canada
Honorary Award Presented By Hennessy	Ubuntu Activism Award
Watkin Jones	Big Zulu
