= Costa Titch =

South African rapper (1995–2023)

Background information
- Born: Costantinos Tsobanoglou; 26 January 1995; Nelspruit, Mpumalanga, South Africa
- Died: 11 March 2023 (aged 28) Johannesburg, South Africa
- Genres: Amapiano; rap; trap; hip hop; afro pop
- Occupations: Rapper; singer; songwriter; dancer; record producer
- Years active: 2015–2023
- Labels: Titch Gang Records, Konvict Kulture

Costantinos Tsobanoglou (26 January 1995 – 11 March 2023), better known by his stage name Costa Titch, was a South African Amapiano rapper, singer-songwriter and dancer.

== Biography ==
Costa Titch's father is Greek, while his mother is South African. He was born in South Africa. Early on, Costa Titch had a passion for entertainment and became a dancer. In 2014, he relocated to Johannesburg, where he continued his career as a rapper.

In 2020, Costa Titch released his debut album titled Made in Africa, which features collaborations with various South African artists such as AKA, Riky Rick, and Boity. The album received critical acclaim and was a commercial success, cementing Costa Titch's position as one of the rising stars in South African music. He went on to earn 3 nominations to the South African Hip Hop Awards 2020, and won the Best Collaboration award for "Nkalakatha Remix" featuring AKA and Riky Rick (a remake of Nkalakatha, originally by Mandoza).

His track "Ayeye" was particularly well-received, due to its uplifting message about staying positive despite life's difficulties. Another one of his tracks, "Big Flexa", broke the record for the most viewed Amapiano music video on YouTube in December 2022. In the same year, he earned joint-most 7 nominations to the All Africa Music Awards 2022.

Costa Titch also collaborated with Senegalese-American singer Akon for a remix of "Big Flexa", featuring contributions from fellow Amapiano musician Alfa Kat and producer Ma Gang.

In 2022, Titch collaborated with Nigerian afrobeats singer O.L.A. for their amapiano single, "Data".

Costa Titch and Champuru Makhenzo then released a joint EP, Trapiano Vol. 1, which would be Titch's last work before his death.

== Death ==
On 11 March 2023, Costa Titch collapsed while performing at the Ultra South Africa music festival in Johannesburg. He quickly regained his footing and continued performing, but collapsed again and was pronounced dead when he arrived at the hospital. He was 28 years old. According to the postmortem investigation that his family and pathologists conducted, the superstar's death was caused by a combination of factors, including an undisclosed strain on his heart, chronic stress, and exhaustion.

The official statement issued by his family states that the pressure on his heart and chronic stress probably caused an abnormal heartbeat, which in turn caused the seizure that killed him while he was performing.

== Discography ==
=== Studio albums ===
- Made In Africa (2020)
- Mr. Big Flexa (2022)

=== Collaborative albums ===
- You're Welcome (2021) feat. AKA

=== Extended plays ===
- For Real Trappers Only (2018)
- Wonderland (2018)
- Trapiano Vol. 1 (2022)
- OMWTFYB
- Gqom Land
- Fallen Kings

== Awards and nominations ==
=== Soundcity MVP Awards Festival ===
Year	Nominee / work	Award	Result	Ref.
2023	"Big Flexa" (featuring C'Buda M, Alfa Kat, Banaba Des, Sdida & Man T)	Viewers' Choice	Won	
2023	"Big Flexa" (featuring C'Buda M, Alfa Kat, Banaba Des, Sdida & Man T)	Video of the Year	Nominated	

=== All Africa Music Awards ===
Year	Nominee / work	Award	Result	Ref.
2022	"Big Flexa" (featuring C'Buda M, Alfa Kat, Banaba Des, Sdida & Man T)	Best African Collaboration	Nominated	
2022	"Big Flexa" (featuring C'Buda M, Alfa Kat, Banaba Des, Sdida & Man T)	Best Artiste/Duo/Group in African Dance/Choreography	Nominated	
2022	"Big Flexa" (featuring C'Buda M, Alfa Kat, Banaba Des, Sdida & Man T)	Best Artiste/Duo/Group in African Electro	Nominated	
2022	"Big Flexa" (featuring C'Buda M, Alfa Kat, Banaba Des, Sdida & Man T)	Best African Video	Nominated	
2022	"Big Flexa" (featuring C'Buda M, Alfa Kat, Banaba Des, Sdida & Man T)	Song of the Year	Nominated	
2022	"Ma Gang" (featuring Phantom Steeze, ManT, Sdida, C'Buda M & Champuru Makhenzo)	Breakout Artist of the Year	Nominated	
2022	"Moyo" Mbosso (featuring Costa Titch & Phantom Steeze)	Best African Collaboration	Nominated	

=== South African Hip Hop Awards ===
Year	Nominee / work	Award	Result	Ref.
2020	"Nkalakatha Remix" (featuring AKA & Riky Rick)	Song of the Year	Nominated	
2020	"Nkalakatha Remix" (featuring AKA & Riky Rick)	Best Collaboration	Won	
2020	"Nkalakatha Remix" (featuring AKA & Riky Rick)	Best Remix	Nominated	
