= Mali Eningi =

Single by Big Zulu featuring Riky Rick and Intaba Yase Dubai

from the album Ichwane Lenyoka
- Released: November 20, 2020
- Recorded: 2020
- Length: 5:00
- Label: Inkabi Records

Big Zulu singles chronology
"Ama Million" (2019)	"Mali Eningi" (2020)	"Inhlupheko" (2021)

Intaba Yase Dubai singles chronology
"Nabanye" (2019)	"Mali Eningi" (2020)	"Sbali" (2021)

Riky Rick singles chronology
"Ungazincishi" (2020)	"Mali Eningi" (2020)	"Forever" (2021)

Music video
- "Mali Eningi" on YouTube

"Mali Eningi" is a song recorded by South African singer-songwriter and rapper Big Zulu featuring Riky Rick and Intaba Yase Dubai. It was released as the lead single of his third studio album, Ichwane Lenyoka (2021), on November 20, 2020, by Inkabi Records.

"Mali Eningi" won Best Collaboration at the 2021 ceremony of South African Music Awards.

== Accolades ==
"Mali Eningi" at the 2021 South African Hip Hop Awards won Song Of the Year, Best Video, and Best Collaboration.

At the 2022 DStv Mzansi Viewers Choice Awards, "Mali Eningi" was nominated for Favourite Song.

Year	Nominee / work	Award	Result
2021	"Mali Eningi"	Song of the Year	Won
2021	"Mali Eningi"	Best Collaboration	Won
2021	"Mali Eningi"	Best Collaboration	Won
2021	"Mali Eningi"	Best Video	Won
2022	"Mali Eningi"	Favourite Song	Nominated

== Commercial performance ==
"Mali Eningi" was commercially success garnered over 20 million streams on Spotify and certified double platinum in South Africa with sales of 80 000 copies.

== Certifications ==
Region	Certification
South Africa (RISA)	2× Platinum

== Music video ==
Music video was filmed by Unclescrooch. As of January 2021, the song music video has ganarred 6 Million views on YouTube.

== Track listing ==
Digital download and streaming

1. "Mali Eningi" – 5:00

== Usage in media ==
In December 2020, "Mali Eningi" started trending on social media after Duduzane Zuma posted himself on Instagram playing the song, soon after dance challenge was started with the hashtag #DuduzaneChallenge garnering enormous success, and South African DJ's DJ Tira and DJ Fresh participating in the challenge.

== Release history ==
Release dates and formats for "Mali Eningi"
Region	Date	Format(s)	Version	Label	Ref.
South Africa	November 20, 2020	Digital download; streaming	Original	Inkabi Records	
