= Cold Waters (album) =

Studio album by PdotO
- Released: January 24, 2020
- Genre: Hip hop
- Length: 76:00
- Language: English
- Label: God bless the God blessed Ent.

PdotO chronology
Under the Sun (2018)	Cold Waters (2020)	Cold Waters: Love Eternal (2020)

Singles from Cold Waters
- 1. "Kingdom Come" Released: 10 May 2019

Cold Waters is the third studio album by South African rapper PdotO. It was released on 24 January 2020 through the label God bless the God blessed Entertainment. The 17-track album features African artists Big Zulu, Zubz, Kid X, Sky Nomonde, Fuego Phoenix, PowerOf2, Jay Claude, Thokozile, Khumo Left and Ras.

== Background ==
PdotO revealed that the idea to work on the album was inspired by the works of Damien Rice in 2004. He went on to add a part of Damien Rice’s Cold Water at the end of his Idols to Idols featuring Zubz. Explaining his album:

Cold Waters is an idea I have had since 2004. It’s been at the back of my mind since I heard the song Cold Water by one of my favorite artists ‘Damien Rice in 2004. It sparked everything. I knew I wanted to use that idea, I even wrote a screenplay under that name eventually it morphed into the album. So it’s been in my head since then, and most of my concepts have been in my head for years, but roughly it took six months to put the album together.

== Singles ==
"Kingdom Come" is the second song that was released on 10 May 2019 and featured singer Thokozile.

The last song "Dear God" contained overt spiritual connotations. The music video of the song was recorded by Fine Pictures and released on 24 January 2020. The visuals were black and white and the scenery of the shot was mainly focused on the rapper singing and expressing his feelings to God.

== Track listing ==
Cold Waters
No.	Title	Length
1.	"Cold Waters (Intro)"	2:26
2.	"Kingdom Come" (featuring Thokozile)	4:35
3.	"Changes"	2:36
4.	"You Don't Know Me" (featuring Ras, Zaddyswag & Linden Mark)	5:30
5.	"Idols to Idols" (featuring Zubz)	3:42
6.	"Y.O.U (Your Only Us)" (featuring Jay Claude)	4:18
7.	"Don't Believe Her" (featuring Khumo Leff)	3:15
8.	"Stripes & Swords" (featuring Kid X & Big Zulu)	4:06
9.	"Black Waters"	5:13
10.	"Saints & Sinners/Yungwave Interlude"	6:35
11.	"Long Way"	4:21
12.	"More Water for the Daughters" (featuring Khumo Left)	4:34
13.	"We Found Love" (featuring Powerof2)	2:55
14.	"Still Waters"	5:06
15.	"Get Mine" (featuring Fuego Phoenix)	6:18
16.	"Dear God"	5:47
17.	"Stage Fright" (featuring Sky Nomonde)	5:05
Total length:		52:00

== Release history ==
List of release dates, showing region, formats, label, editions and reference
Region	Date	Format(s)	Label	Edition(s)
Various	24 January 2020	CD; digital download; streaming	God bless the God blessed Ent.	Standard
