= Big Zulu =

South African rapper and songwriter

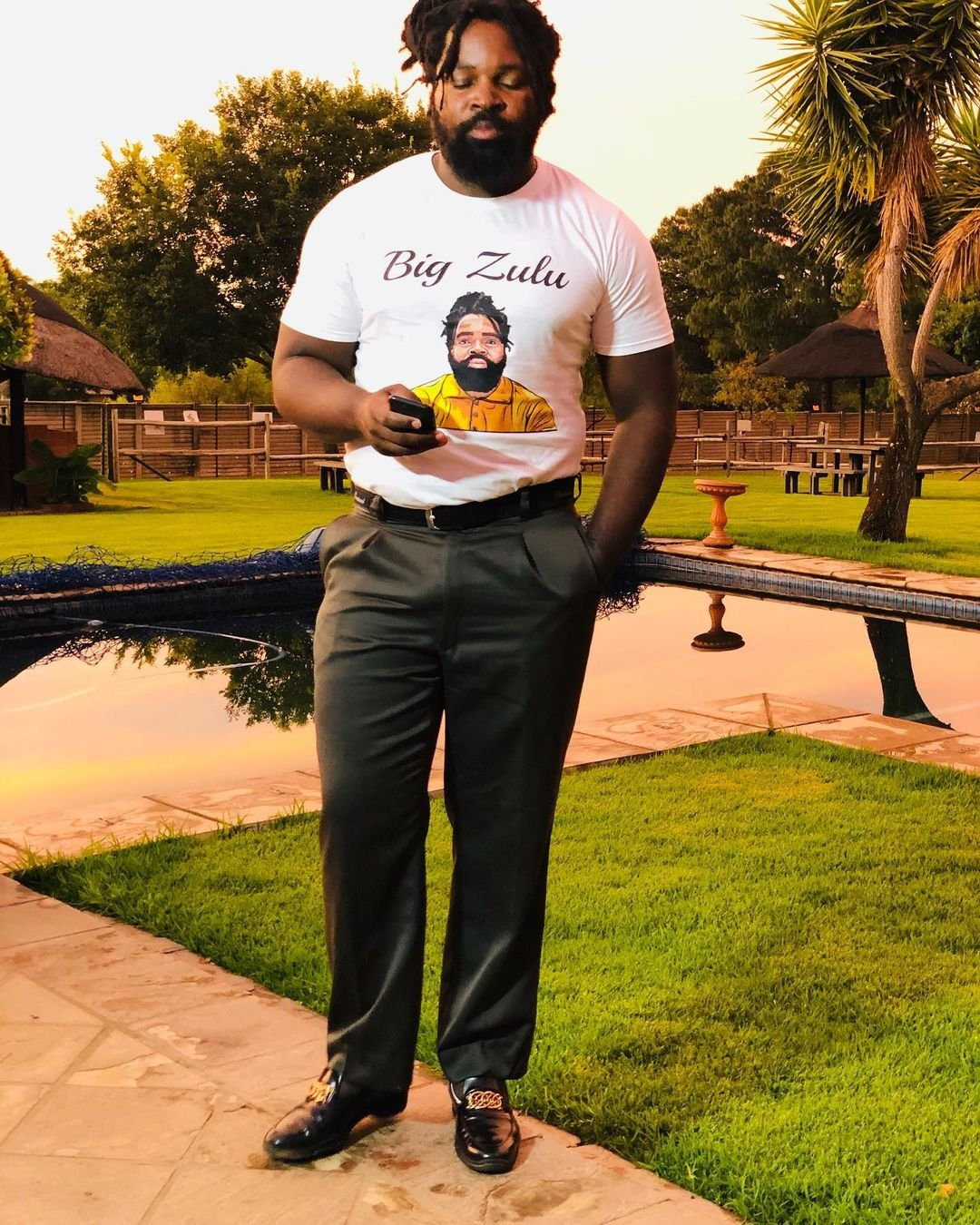

Background information
- Born: Siyabonga Nene; 7 April 1986 (age 40); Bergville, South Africa
- Occupations: Rapper; songwriter
- Years active: 2003–present
- Labels: Universal Records (former); Nkabi Records

Siyabonga Nene (born 7 April 1986), known professionally as Big Zulu, is a South African rapper and songwriter. He rose to spotlight after releasing the single "Donsa Nkabi" in 2016.

He signed a record deal with Universal Music in 2015 and Zulu released his debut album, Ushun Wenkabi (2018) and Ungqongqoshe Wongqongqoshe (2019).

Zulu's third studio album Ichwane Lenyoka (2021), spawned three chart-topping singles "Mali Eningi", "Inhlupheko" and "Umuzi eSandton". Its lead single "Mali Eningi", was certified double platinum by the Recording Industry of South Africa (RiSA).

Zulu also appeared in the television shows Isibaya, One Mic (2017–2020), Uzalo (2020), Isithembiso, and Ushuni Womhlaba (2024). His accolades include seven South African Hip Hop Awards, one South African Music Award and one Metro FM Music Award.

== Early life ==
Siyabonga Nene was born and raised in Bergville, KwaZulu-Natal. He grew up listening to Maskandi and Isichathamiya music, influenced by Ladysmith Black Mambazo, Phuzekemisi and Imithente.

== Artistry ==
=== Influences ===
He is influenced by Maskandi and Scathamiya. He used to live in the Vaal in a place called Palm Springs.

== Career ==
=== Career beginnings ===
Zulu spent several years as a taxi driver and quit in 2008 to pursue his career in music. In 2009, just after he left taxi industry started writing songs and performing.

Four years later in 2013, Zulu contested and became the first to win Red Bull Back to the city competition. His debut single "Donsa Nkabi" was released in 2016.

=== 2014–2019: Ushun Wenkabi, Ungqongqoshe Wongqongqoshe ===
After a number of years as an independent artist, he signed a record deal with Universal Music Records in 2015 and released his debut album Ushun Wenkabi in July 2018, with singles including "Ang'mazi umama" and "Home".

His second studio album Ungqongqoshe Wongqongqoshe was released in 2019, featuring Ab Crazy, Mnqobi Yazo, FiFi Cooper, Kwesta, Caspper Nyovest, Musiholiq and Truhitz. The lead single "Ak'laleki" featuring Kwesta was released. In 2 August his second single "Ama Million" featuring Cassper Nyovest & Musiholiq was released and peaked No. 5 on the iTunes Chart. The song was certified platinum. In August 14, his third single "Vuma dlozi" featuring Mnqobi Yazo was released and certified platinum by the Recording industry of South Africa (RiSA) with sales of 50 000 copies. The album was certified gold by the Recording Industry of South Africa (RiSA) and earned a nomination at the South African Music Awards (SAMA26) for Best Hip Hop Album. In the same year, 2019, the album was nominated for Best Male Artist of the Year and Album of the Year at the South African Hip Hop Awards. He established his own record label Nkabi Records.

=== 2020–2022: Ichwane Lenyoka, Nkabi Nation ===
On November 20, 2020, his single "Mali Eningi" was released featuring Intaba Yase Dubai & Ricky Rick as the album's lead single. The song debuted number 2 on Channel 0 Top 30 charts and was certified double platinum. At the 27th annual South African Music Awards, "Mali Eningi" won Best collaboration category. At the end of 2020 he was selected for the first time on MTV Base: SA's Hottest MCs, at the fifth place.

Towards the end of the January 2021, he announced the working on his third studio album.

On March 11, 2021, he released a single "Inhlupheko" featuring Mduduzi Ncube as the second single. The song peaked at number one on the South African iTunes charts and reach number 4 on Shazam charts.

On 3 July 2021, he announced a new single titled "Umuzi eSandton" featuring Lwah Ndlunkulu on Twitter. The song was released on 9 July 2021; It was featured on his album Ichwane Lenyoka, which was released on 3 September 2021. The single "Umuzi eSandton" reached number one on Shazam charts.

On September 13, 2021, he performed on season 14 on Idols South Africa. Zulu won seven awards includes; Album of the Year, Song of the Year ("Mali Eningi"), Best Music Video, Best Male and Ubuntu Activism Award, Best Collaboration, and Best Digital Sales at the 2021 South African Hip Hop Awards. At the end of 2021 he was selected again on MTV Base: SA's Hottest MCs, climbing to the second place.

"iVolovolo" featuring Xowla was released on February 11, 2022. The song debuted number one in South Africa.

"Voicemail" by Big Zulu Mduduzi Ncube, Lwah Ndlunkulu, Siya Ntuli and Xowla was released as album's lead single on June 24, 2022. The song was certified Gold and reached number one in South Africa.

Zulu released "150 Bars (Ke hip hop Dawg)" on August 20, 2022. The song entered Local Top 10 Radio charts at number 7.

Zulu announced albums release date and final track listing on Instagram, released on September 9, 2022.

"Dear My Love" featuring K.O, Xowla and Siya Ntuli is a single by Big Zulu released on November 25, 2022.

=== 2023-2024: Inkabi Zezwe, Ukhamba, Ngises' Congweni ===
On March 17, 2023, Big Zulu and Sjava announced the working on their joint album Ukhamba as duo Inkabi Zezwe. "Umbayimbayi" was released on March 24, 2023, as album's lead single. The song debuted number one on iTunes Top 50 & Spotify Top 100 South Africa consecutively. The song was certified 3× Platinum in South Africa.

On April 1, Zulu announced Inkabi Zezwe Tour that ran from June until September 2023.

The album was released on May 12, 2023. It debuted number one in two countries South Africa and Eswatini consecutively.

Towards the end of January 2024, Zulu announced the working on his fourth studio album and albums lead single "Awufuni Ukung' Qoma". Ngises' Congweni was released on March 27, 2023.

=== 2025-present: Icala Le Mpumelelo, Undodakazi ===
The single "Abazazi Bafunani" with Emtee was released on March 7, 2025. It debuted No. 1 SA Spotify charts and entered No. 2 on both Top 20 S.A Radio Airplay Chart and Top 200 Charts. In addition it reached No. 7 on The Official South African Charts, also charted No. 17 on Ukhozi FM Top 20 charts.

His fourth studio album Icala Le Mpumelelo was released on April 11, 2025.

In early September 2025, Zulu announce collaborative album with Nkabikazi titled Undodakazi. The album was released on October 10, 2025.

=== Television ===
In June 2024, Zulu joined talent search show Ushuni Womhlaba, as a judge premiered on SABC 1 on 7 July.

=== Other ventures ===
In 2019, Zulu founded the record label Inkabi Records. Zulu has since signed Mduduzi Ncube, Lwah Ndlunkulu, Xowla and Siya Ntuli.

On September 21, 2021, Zulu started charity and donated with laptops and printers to Obonjaneni Primary School.

As of August 2020, he partnered with Spitz as the ambassador of Carvela.

== Discography ==
=== Studio albums ===
- Ushun Wenkabi 1 (2018)
- Ungqongqoshe Wongqongqoshe (2019)
- Ichwane Lenyoka (2021)
- Ngises' Congweni (2024)
- Icala Le Mpumelelo (2025)
- Umkhulu (2026)

=== Collaborative albums ===
- Inkabi Nation (2022)
- Ukhamba (2023)

=== As lead artist ===
List of singles as lead artist, with selected chart positions and certifications, showing year released and album name
| Title | Year | Peak chart positions | Certifications | Album |
| Title | Year | ZA | Certifications | Album |
|---|---|---|---|---|
| "AmaMillion" featuring Musiholiq, Cassper Nyovest | 2019 | | Platinum | Ngqongqoshe Wongqongqoshe |
| "Vuma Dlozi" featuring Mnqobi Yazo | 2020 | | Platinum | Ngqongqoshe Wongqongqoshe |
| "Mali Eningi" featuring Ntaba Yase Dubai, Ricky Rick | 2021 | 2 | 2× Platinum | Ichwane Lenyoka |
| "Umuzi eSandton" featuring Lwah Ndlunkulu | 2021 | — | Platinum | Ichwane Lenyoka |
| "Inhlupheko" featuring Mduduzi Ncube | 2021 | 1 | Platinum | Ichwane Lenyoka |
| "iVolovolo" featuring Xowla | 2022 | — | 3× Platinum | Ichwane Lenyoka |
| "Dear My Love" featuring Xowla, K.O and Siya Ntuli | 2022 | — | | Non-album single |
| "Awufuni Ukung' Qoma" | 2024 | — | 2× Platinum | Ngises' Congweni |
| "200 Bars" | 2024 | — | | Non-album single |
| "Ay Ka'Ncane" (Big Zulu, Tony Dayimane) | 2024 | — | | Non-album single |
| "Amacala Othando" (Big Zulu, Azana, Malungelo) | 2025 | — | 2× Platinum | Non-album single |
| "Abazazi Bafunani" (featuring Emtee) | 2025 | 2 | 2× Platinum | Icala Le Mpumelelo |
"—" denotes a recording that did not chart or was not released in that territory.

=== As featured artist ===
List of singles as featured artist, with selected chart positions and certifications, showing year released and album name
| Title | Year | Peak chart positions | Certifications | Album |
| Title | Year | ZA | Certifications | Album |
|---|---|---|---|---|
| "Isigingci" (Mduduzi featuring Big Zulu) | 2020 | — | | Isitimela |
| "Alusafani" (Qwabe Twins featuring Big Zulu, Mduduzi, Xowla) | 2021 | — | | |
| "Qoma" (Blaq Diamond featuring Siya Ntuli, Big Zulu) | 2021 | — | RiSA: Platinum | Zulu Romance |
| "Amalobolo" (Nomfundo Moh featuring Big Zulu) | 2023 | — | | Ugcobo |
| "Beng' dakiwe (Xowla featuring Big Zulu, DJ Tira) | 2023 | — | | Non-album single |
| "My Ex" (Big Xhosa featuring Big Zulu) | 2023 | — | | Non-album single |
| "Mfazi Wephepha" (Nkosazana Daughter, Master Kg featuring Big Zulu, Zee Nxumalo) | 2024 | 4 | | Makhelwane |

== Awards and nominations ==
| Year | Award | Category | Results | Ref. |
|---|---|---|---|---|
| 2019 | S A H H A | Album of the Year | Nominated | |
| 2019 | S A H H A | Best Male Artist of the Year | Nominated | |
| 2019 | SAMA 26 | Best Hip Hop Album | Nominated | |
| 2020 | S A H H A | Best Remix | Nominated | |
| 2021 | SAMA 27 | Best Collaboration | Won | |
| 2021 | SAHHA 10 | Album of the Year | Won | |
| 2021 | SAHHA 10 | Best Male | Won | |
| 2021 | SAHHA 10 | Song of the Year | Won | |
| 2021 | SAHHA 10 | Best Collaboration | Won | |
| 2021 | SAHHA 10 | MVP/Hustler of the Year | Nominated | |
| 2021 | SAHHA 10 | Best Video | Won | |
| 2021 | SAHHA 10 | Ubuntu Activism Award | Won | |
| 2021 | SAHHA 10 | Best Digital Sales | Won | |
| 2022 | DStv MVCA | Favourite Song | Nominated | |
| 2022 | DStv MVCA | Favourite Music Artist/Group | Nominated | |
| 2023 | 17th Metro FM Music Awards | Best Duo/Group | Won | |
