= Inkabi Nation =

Studio album by Big Zulu, Xowla, Siya Ntuli, Lwah Ndlunkulu and Mduduzi Ncube
- Released: September 9, 2022
- Length: 50:00
- Label: Nkabi Records
- Producer: Xowla

Big Zulu chronology
Ichwane Lenyoka (2021)	Nkabi Nation (2022)	Ngises' Congweni (2024)

Mduduzi Ncube chronology
Istimela (2020)	Nkabi Nation (2022)

Lwah Ndlunkulu chronology
Nkabi Nation (2022)	Imizwa (2023)

Inkabi Nation is a studio album by South African artists Big Zulu, Xowla, Siya Ntuli, Mduduzi Ncube and Lwah Ndlunkulu, released on September 9, 2022 through Nkabi Records.

== Background ==
In early September 2022, Big Zulu announced the album's release date and final track listing on Instagram.

== Awards ==
The album earned a nomination for Best Traditional Album at 29th South African Music Awards.

Year	Nominee / work	Award	Result
2023	Inkabi Nation	Best Traditional Album	Nominated

== Track listing ==
Standard Edition
No.	Title	Length
1.	"Intro"	3:39
2.	"Naphakade" (L.A Beatz, Lwah Ndlunkulu, Mduduzi Ncube, Siya Ntuli)	4:05
3.	"Kuyokhanya" (Siya Ntuli, Mduduzi Ncube, Big Zulu)	4:23
4.	"Voicemail" (Big Zulu, Mduduzi Ncube, Lwah Ndlunkulu, Siya Ntuli, Xowla)	4:28
5.	"Amanz'Ewolintshi" (Big Zulu, Mduduzi Ncube, Lwah Ndlunkulu, Siya Ntuli, Xowla)	4:38
6.	"Umaqondana" (Lwah Ndlunkulu, Siya Ntuli, Xowla, Mduduzi Ncube)	4:24
7.	"Impendulo" (Siya Ntuli, Big Zulu, Mduduzi Ncube, Lwah Ndlunkulu)	2:43
8.	"Shuni Wenkabi" (Xowla, Siya Ntuli, Big Zulu, Mduduzi Ncube)	4:49
9.	"Abantu" (Mduduzi Ncube, Lwah Ndlunkulu, Siya Ntuli)	3:32
10.	"Yinto Enjani" (Xowla, Lwah Ndlunkulu, Siya Ntuli, Mduduzi Ncube)	3:44
11.	"Yinto Enjani" (Mduduzi Ncube)	4:53
12.	"Okwamazolo" (L.A Beatz, Siya Ntuli, Xowla, Mduduzi Ncube)	4:27
Total length:		50:00

== Release and singles ==
"Voicemail" by Big Zulu, Mduduzi Ncube, Lwah Ndlunkulu, Siya Ntuli and Xowla was released as the album's lead single on June 24, 2022. The song peaked at number one on Apple Music in South Africa.

The standard edition of the album was released on September 9, 2022.
