= Lwah Ndlunkulu =

South African singer-songwriter

- Born: Lwandile Mtshali; Hluhluwe, KwaZulu-Natal, South Africa
- Genres: Afro-Pop
- Occupations: singer; songwriter
- Instrument: Vocals
- Years active: 2021–present
- Label: Nkabi Records

Lwandile Mtshali, professionally known as Lwah Ndlunkulu or Lwah The Ndlunkulu is a South African singer and songwriter. Born and raised Hluhluwe, KwaZulu-Natal, having signed a record deal with Nkabi Records released her debut single "Ithuba", which became her first biggest song and certified Platinum by the Recording Industry of South Africa (RiSA).

== Career ==
Lwandile Mtshali was born and raised in Hluhluwe, she relocated to Johannesburg, Gauteng to her mother's house while she was studying Grade 11 in 2020. She got a job at Hillbrow Radio Station as a radio presenter prior working at a club situated at Maboneng. While she was working at the club she met music producer Celza and invited her to visit Nkabi Records prior signing a record deal. Lwah signed a record deal and made her debut on Big Zulu's single "Umuzi eSandton" which appeared on Ichwane Lenyoka. The song reached number 1 in South Africa . "Home" featuring Sjava was released 2021.

Lwah appeared on a joint album of Nkabi Records Inkabi Nation alongside Xowla, Siya Ntuli, Big Zulu and Mduduzi released 2022.

Lwah gained global prominence after her breakthrough debut single "Ithuba" featuring Siya Ntuli was released August 2022. The song was certified platinum by the Recording Industry of South Africa (RiSA).

"Ngiyeza" was released on January 20, 2023. It reached number #2, #4, #5, #9 iTune Charts, Shazam, Apple Music and Spotify respectively within the first week of release. It reached Platinum by Recording Industry of South Africa.

Lwah leads the nominees with 4 nominations for Song of the Year, Afro Pop Artist of the Year, Artist of the Year at 2023 Basadi in Music Awards.

Ndlunkulu announced her debut studio album Imizwa, on November 13, 2023. The album was released on November 24.

Upon its release it debuted number one on Spotify's Top Albums Charts, and amassed two million streams on Spotify, 10 days after its release.

=== 2026-present: Isithembu ===
Towards the end of August 2026, Lwah and MaWhoo announced themselves as Zulu Queens duo, are set to release their studio album Isithembu, on August 28, 2026. "Distance" featuring Feza was released on August 19, as albums lead single.

== Singles ==
=== As lead artist ===
List of singles as lead artist, with selected chart positions and certifications, showing year released and album name
Title	Year	Peak chart positions	Certifications	Album
Title	Year	ZA	Certifications	Album
"Home" (featuring Sjava)	2021	—		Non-album single
"Ithuba" (featuring Siya Ntuli)	2022	—	RiSA: Platinum	Imizwa
"Ngiyeza"	2023	1	RiSA: Platinum	Imizwa
"Eyami"	2023	—		Imizwa
"Ngikhathazekile" (Bongo Beats, Lwah Ndlunkulu, Khethi)	2023	—		Non-album single
"Imizwa" (Tony Dayimane, Lwah Ndlunkulu)	2025	—		Non-album single
"Mnakwethu"	2025	—	Platinum	Amaciko
"Nembeza" (Lwah Ndlunkulu featuring MaWhoo)	2025	—	Platinum	Amaciko
"Allowance" (Starr Healer, Lwah Ndlunkulu)	2025	—	Platinum	Non-album single
"Ngisayogana" (Starr Healer, Lwah Ndlunkulu)	2026	—		Non-album single
"—" denotes a recording that did not chart or was not released in that territory.

=== As featured artist ===
List of singles as featured artist, with selected chart positions and certifications, showing year released and album name
Title	Year	Peak chart positions	Certifications	Album
Title	Year	ZA	Certifications	Album
"Paris" (Mthandeni SK featuring Lwah Ndlunkulu)	2023	—	RiSA: Multi-Platinum	Non-album single
"Umsindo we Nhliziyo" (Xowla featuring Lwah Ndlunkulu)	2024	—		Non-album single
"—" denotes a recording that did not chart or was not released in that territory.

== Other charted and certified songs ==
List of other charted songs, with selected chart positions and certifications, showing year released and album name
Title	Year	Peak chart positions	Certifications	Album
Title	Year	ZA	Certifications	Album
"Maye" (Lwah Ndlunkulu featuring Dr. Buselaphi)	2023	—	Gold	Imizwa
"Notification" (featuring Big Zulu)	2023	—	Gold	Imizwa
"—" denotes a recording that did not chart or was not released in that territory.

== Discography ==
=== Studio albums ===
- Imizwa (2023)
- Amaciko (2025)

=== Guest appearances ===
Title	Year	Other artist(s)	Album
"Mushonga"	2023	Makhadzi	Mbofholowo
"Cela Skhulume"	2023	DJ Tira	Malume Way
"Ntombo"	2024	Blaq Diamond	Zulu Romance

== Achievements ==
Lwah Ndlunkulu awards and nominations
Awards and nominations
Award	Wins	Nominations
Basadi in Music Awards	5	12
Metro FM Music Awards	1	6
South African Hip Hop Awards	0	2
South African Music Awards	2	5
Urban Music Awards	-	4

Totals (Note: Certain award groups do not simply award one winner. They acknowledge several different recipients, have runners-up, and have third place. Since this is a specific recognition and is different from losing an award, runner-up mentions are considered wins in this award tally. For simplification and to avoid errors, each award in this list has been presumed to have had a prior nomination.)
- Wins: 8
- Nominations: 29

=== Basadi in Music Awards ===
Year	Nominee / work	Award	Result	Ref.
2023	"Ithuba" featuring Siya Ntuli	Song of the Year	Won	
2023	Herself	Afro Pop Artist of the Year	Nominated	
2023	Herself	Artist of the Year	Won	
2023	"Ngiyeza"	Music Video of the Year	Nominated	
2024	Herself	Artist of the Year	Won	
2024	"Eyami"	Afro Pop Artist of the Year	Nominated	
2024	"Eyami"	Song of the Year	Nominated	
2024	"Ngiyathandaza"	Music Video of the Year	Nominated	
2024	"Ngiyeza"	Capasso Most Streamed Song	Won	
2025	"Mnakwethu"	Song of the Year	Nominated	
2025	Herself	Afro Pop Artist of the Year	Nominated	
2026	"Allowance"	Best Collaboration of the Year	Won	

=== Metro FM Awards ===
Year	Nominee / work	Award	Result	Ref.
2024	Herself	Artist of the Year	Won	
2024	Herself	Best Female	Nominated	
2024	Imizwa	Best African Pop	Nominated	
2026	Amaciko	Best Produced Album	Pending	
2026	Herself	Best Female Artist	Pending	
2026	"Mnakwethu"	Best African Pop	Pending	

=== South African Hip Hop Awards ===
Year	Nominee / work	Award	Result	Ref.
2021	"Umuzi eSandton"	Song of the Year	Nominated	
2021	"Umuzi eSandton"	Best Collabo	Nominated	

=== South African Music Awards ===
Year	Nominee / work	Award	Result	Ref.
2024	"Paris"	Motsepe Foundation Record of the Year	Won	
2024	"Ngiyeza"	RAV Music Video of the Year	Nominated	
2024	Imizwa	Newcomer of the Year	Nominated	
2024	Imizwa	Female Artist of the Year	Nominated	
2024	Imizwa	Best Afro Pop Album	Won	

=== Urban Music Awards ===
Year	Nominee / work	Award	Result	Ref.
2025	Herself	Artist of the Year	Pending	
2025	Herself	Best Female Act	Pending	
2025	Herself	Best Newcomer	Pending	
2025	Herself	Best Afro Pop Act	Pending	
