= Imizwa =

Studio album by Lwah Ndlunkulu
- Released: November 24, 2023
- Length: 48:00 (Standard Edition); 1:06:00 (Deluxe Edition)
- Label: Inkabi Records
- Producer: Xowla

Lwah Ndlunkulu chronology
Imizwa (2023)	Amaciko (2025)

Singles from Imizwa
- 1. "Ithuba" Released: 12 August 2022; 2. "Ngiyeza" Released: 20 January 2023; 3. "Eyami" Released: 4 August 2023

Imizwa is the debut studio album by South African singer-songwriter Lwah Ndlunkulu, released on November 24, 2023, through Inkabi Records.

Lwah Ndlunkulu released a deluxe version of the album, titled Imizwa (Deluxe) on August 9, 2024, which includes the original album's 12 tracks along with 6 new ones. With features from Mzukulu and Xowla.

== Commercial performance ==
The album reached number one on Spotify's Top Albums Chart, and surpassed two million streams on Spotify, 10 days after its release.

=== Accolades ===
Imizwa earned a nomination for Best African Pop at 2024 Metro FM Music Awards Awards. In addition the album received nominations for Female Artist of the Year, Newcomer of the Year, Best Afro Pop Album at the 30th ceremony of South African Music Awards.

Year	Nominee / work	Award	Result	Ref.
2024	Imizwa	Best African Pop	Nominated	
2024	Imizwa	Newcomer of the Year	Nominated	
2024	Imizwa	Female Artist of the Year	Nominated	
2024	Imizwa	Best Afro Pop Album	Won	

== Track listing ==
All tracks are written by Lwah Ndlunkulu.

Standard Edition
No.	Title	Length
1.	"Khuphuka"	3:43
2.	"Ngiyeza"	4:41
3.	"Umtshingo"	3:42
4.	"Ngezenzo"	3:38
5.	"Maye" (featuring Dr. Buselaphi)	3:14
6.	"Eyokuza"	4:07
7.	"Ithuba" (featuring Siya Ntuli)	4:23
8.	"Ngiyathandaza"	3:34
9.	"Notification" (featuring Big Zulu)	3:51
10.	"Eyami"	4:20
11.	"Mali"	4:48
12.	"Indawo Yakho"	4:34
Total length:		48:00

Deluxe Edition
No.	Title	Length
13.	"Can't Get" (featuring Mzukulu)	3:55
14.	"uMama"	3:54
15.	"Makhelwane"	3:18
16.	"Sihleka" (featuring Xowla)	3:10
17.	"Bengithi"	4:22
18.	"Happy"	2:17
Total length:		60:06:00

== Personnel ==
Credits are adapted from AllMusic.

- Big Zulu - Featured Artist
- Dr. Buselaphi - Featured Artist
- Irene Gxowa Buselaphi - Composer
- Lwah Ndlunkulu - Primary Artist
- Lwandile Mtshali - Composer
- Siya Ntuli - Featured Artist
- Siyabonga Nene - Composer
- Siyabonga Ntuli - Composer
- Xolani Shabalala - Composer

== Certifications ==
Region	Certification	Certified units/sales
South Africa (RISA)	Gold	25,000^{‡}
^{‡} Sales+streaming figures based on certification alone.
