= PdotO =

South African rapper

- Born: Siphelele Mnyande; 11 March 1985 (age 41); East London, Eastern Cape
- Origin: South Africa
- Genres: Hip hop
- Occupations: Rapper; songwriter
- Instrument: Vocals
- Years active: 2010–present
- Labels: HearStreet Music (Former); CapCity Records (Former); God bless the God Blessed Ent.(Current)

Siphelele Mnyande, known professionally as PdotO, is a South African rapper and songwriter.

== Career ==
He has collaborated with various artists such as L-Tido, Chad Da Don, Reason, J.Smallz and Bongani Fassie.

On 14 July 2017, he released his debut album Devilz Playground which featured vocalists and rappers such as J.Smallz, Kimosabe, Blaklez, Ginger Trill and Maggz.

In 2018, both his acting and musical career further grew when he got a leading role in the State Theatre production, Freedom the Musical which was directed by multi-award winning director, Aubrey Sekhabi. In the same year he released his second album titled, Under the Sun. He was also on the BET Africa Cyphers representing CapCity in 2018.

== Discography ==
Studio albums

- The Devil'z Playground (2017)
- Under the Sun (2018)
- Cold Waters (2020)
- Cold Waters: Love Eternal (2020)
- Cold Waters: Low Tides and Lost Tapes (2021)
- Siphelele (Book 1) (2024)
- Siphelele (Book 2) (2025)
- Take It As You May (2026)

Collaboration albums

- Lost Diamonds (with Blaklez) (2020)
- Like Water Mixtape (with DJ Switch) (2021)
- Matthew 22:14 (with Chad Da Don)(2021)
- Lost Diamonds 2 (with Blaklez) (2022)
- Psalm 23 (with Chad Da Don)(2022)

Mixtapes

- Street Novelty (2009)
- Blue Murda-PdotO Mixtape (2010)
- Mind over MAtter LP (2011)
- Son of Nomsa Mixtape (2023)

== Filmography ==
=== Television ===
Film
Year	Title	Role	note	Ref.
2019	Nomayini	Himself	Film	
2020	Jacob's Cross	Himself	Series	
2020	Inkaba	Himself	Series	

The Phoenix - Etv Series ( Ndoda)

== Awards and nominations ==
Year	Award ceremony	Prize	Result
2018	South African Hip Hop Awards	Lyricist of The Year	Nominated
2019	South African Hip Hop Awards	Lyricist of The Year	Nominated
2019	South African Hip Hop Awards	Best Remix	Nominated
2020	South African Hip Hop Awards	Best Male	Nominated
2020	South African Hip Hop Awards	Album of the Year	Nominated
2020	South African Hip Hop Awards	Lyricist of The Year	Nominated
2021	South African Hip Hop Awards	Lyricist of the Year	Nominated
