= Ntoni Na =

2021 song by Yanga Chief

"Ntoni Na" is a single by South African singer-songwriter and videographer Yanga Chief released on 3 September 2021 through Sony Music Entertainment Africa under exclusive license from Young Legend Music, it features guest appearances from Blxckie and 25K, on 24 March 2023 it was certified Gold by the Recording Industry of South Africa.

== Certification and sales ==
| Region | Certification | Certified units/sales |
|---|---|---|
| South Africa (RISA) | Gold | 10,000^{‡} |
^{‡} Sales+streaming figures based on certification alone.

== Awards and nominations ==
| Year | Award ceremony | Category | Recipient/Nominated work | Results | Ref. |
|---|---|---|---|---|---|
| 2022 | South African Hip Hop Awards | Song of the Year | "Ntoni Na" | Nominated | |
