= Ungqongqoshe Wongqongqoshe =

Studio album by Big Zulu
- Released: 13 September 2019
- Studio: Universal Music
- Length: 48:00
- Label: Inkabi Records
- Producer: Greyvooka; Big Zulu (exec.); Tru Hitz; AB Crazy; MBzet Da Producer; Master Dee; Beats By Bross; Lazarus Nyashanu

Big Zulu chronology
| Ushun' Wenkabi (2018) | Ungqongqoshe Wongqongqoshe (2019) | Ichwane Lenyoka (2021) |

Ungqongqoshe Wongqongqoshe is the second studio album by South African rapper Big Zulu. It was released by Inkabi Records on 13 September 2019.

Ungqongqoshe Wongqongqoshe was certified gold and nominated for Best Hip Hop Album at the 26th South African Music Awards.

== Commercial performance ==
The album was certified gold in South Africa.

== Accolades ==
At the South African Hip Hop Awards 2019, Ungqongqoshe Wongqongqoshe was nominated for Album of the Year.

| Year | Nominee / work | Award | Result | Ref. |
|---|---|---|---|---|
| 2019 | Ungqongqoshe Wongqongqoshe | Album of the Year | Nominated | |

== Singles ==
"Ama Million" was released as album's lead single featuring Cassper Nyovest and Musiholiq on 2 August 2019.

== Track listing ==
Ungqongqoshe Wongqongqoshe Track listing
| No. | Title | Length |
|---|---|---|
| 1. | "Ungqongqoshe Wongqongqoshe (50 Bars)" | 4:17 |
| 2. | "Vuma Dlozi" (featuring Mnqobi Yazo) | 4:38 |
| 3. | "Ugogo" (featuring Ntsiki Mazwai) | 4:23 |
| 4. | "Lomhlaba Unzima" (featuring Umzukulu) | 4:54 |
| 5. | "Wena Wedwa" (featuring Truhitz) | 3:12 |
| 6. | "On My Mind" (featuring AB Crazy & Fifi Cooper) | 4:26 |
| 7. | "Ubuhle Bakho" (featuring Inkosi Yamagcokama) | 3:55 |
| 8. | "Wema Dlamini" (featuring Kid X & Master D) | 4:50 |
| 9. | "Ak'laleki" (featuring Kwesta) | 4:19 |
| 10. | "Ama Million" (featuring Cassper Nyovest & Musiholiq) | 4:18 |
| 11. | "100 bars" | 4:51 |
| Total length: | | 48:00 |

== Personnel ==
Ungqongqoshe Wongqongqoshe credits adapted from Genius and All Music.

- Big Zulu – vocals, writer, executive producer
- AB Crazy – producer (track 6)
- Beats By Bross – producer
- Greyvooka – producer (track 2)
- Lazarus Nyashanu – composer, producer (track 3 and 7)
- Master Dee – producer (track 8)
- MBzet Da Producer – producer (track 9 and 11)
- Kwesta – composer, featured artist
- Tru Hitz – producer (track 5)
- Cassper Nyovest – composer, writer, featured artist (track 10)

== Release history ==
List of release dates, showing region, formats, label, editions and reference
| Region | Date | Format(s) | Label | Edition(s) | Ref. |
|---|---|---|---|---|---|
| South Africa | 13 September 2019 | CD; digital download | Inkabi Records | Standard | |
