= Oscar Mbo =

South African record producer

- Born: Oscar Mbongeni Ndlovu; Pretoria
- Origin: Mpumalanga, South Africa
- Genres: House; Deep house; Nu Jazz; Broken beat; Lounge music
- Occupations: record producer; podcaster; DJ
- Years active: 2017–present
- Label: The Ashmed Hour Records
- Website: www.oscarmbodj.com

Oscar Mbongeni Ndlovu is a South African record producer, podcaster and DJ. He creates house music containing elements of deep house, deep tech, Nu Jazz, broken beat and Lounge music.

He is best known for his founding and starring roles in the entertainment podcast, The Ashmed Hour show.

== Early life ==
Oscar Mbo was born in Pretoria and raised in Kriel, Mpumalanga to the south-west of Witbank where he spent much of his childhood.

== Career ==
In September 2019, he released his debut EP, Life & Love and later in November launched his debut album, Golden Power. He is also a member of the trio group Golden Boys Entertainment.

He has also been featured on Kaya FM's Platinum Friday with T-Bose, Metro FM, TransAfrica Radio and on the Vuzu music television show, Hit Refresh. He has received an endorsement from Diesel.

In 2019, he did his first international tour in DJOON Club in Paris for DJ Shimza's One Man Show as well as in Mozambique. He has also performed and headlined in festivals such as the House Musiq Festival in Swaziland and the Wololo Music Festival in Witbank.

In October 2020, he released his second studio album titled, For The Groovists, which was nominated for the 27th South African Music Awards for Dance album and featured amapiano producer Kabza De Small.

In February 2021, he performed at Blizz Lounge in Pretoria alongside singer Brian Temba.

In July 2021, he released his EP titled, Defenders of House.

== Discography ==
- Love & Life EP (2019)
- Golden Power (2019)
- For The Groovists (2020)
- Defenders of House (2021)
- Groovy Since 90 Sumthin' (2022)
- " Have a Groovy Day " (2024)

=== As lead artist ===
List of singles as lead artist, with selected chart positions and certifications, showing year released and album name
Title	Year	Peak chart positions	Certifications	Album
Title	Year	ZA	Certifications	Album
"Moya Wami" (featuring MaWhoo)	2020	—		Non-album single
"Ulele" (Oscar Mbo, C-Black)	2021	—		Non-album single
"God Listen" (LebtoniQ, Mega BT, Oscar Mbo)	2022	—		Non-album single
"Mohigan Sun" (Mörda, Oscar Mbo featuring Murumba Pitch)	2022	1	RiSA: 2× Platinum	Asante
"iMali" (featuring Brandon Dhludhlu)	2024	—		Have a Groovy Day
"Mngani Wam" (Ciza, Oscar Mbo, Mpho.Wav, Mkhanj)	2026	—		Non-album single
"—" denotes a recording that did not chart or was not released in that territory.

== Awards and nominations ==
Year	Award ceremony	Prize	Result	Ref.
2021	South African Music Awards	Male Artist of the Year	Nominated	
2021	South African Music Awards	Best Dance Album	Nominated	
2024	South African Music Awards	RAV Music Video of the Year	Nominated	
2024	South African Music Awards	Remix of the Year	Nominated	
2024	GQ Best Dressed Awards	Best Dressed Celebrity	Won	
2025	Metro FM Music Awards	Best Dance Song	Pending	
2025	Metro FM Music Awards	Best Styled Artist	Pending	
