= Pop Star (album) =

2020 album by Yanga Chief

Studio album by Yanga Chief
- Released: 27 November 2020
- Length: 59:03
- Label: Sony Music Entertainment Africa

Yanga Chief chronology
Becoming a Pop Star (2019)	Pop Star (2020)	Lord Faku - The Life Of A Dyan (2025)

Pop Star is the debut studio album by South African singer-songwriter and videographer Yanga Chief released on 27 November 2020 through Sony Music Entertainment Africa under exclusive license from Young Legend Music, it is the sequel to his debut extended play (EP) Becoming a Pop Star (2019). It was led by singles "BBAF" and "Manelo", and features guest appearances from Langa Mavuso, Maglera Doe Boy, Frank Casino, Tshego AMG, SaveMilli and Thabsie.

== Awards and nominations ==
Awards and nominations for Pop Star
Year	Award ceremony	Category	Results	Ref.
2021	South African Music Awards	Best Hip Hop Album	Nominated	

== Track listing ==
Pop Star track listing
No.	Title	Length
1.	"FIFA" (featuring Langa Mavuso)	3:01
2.	"Ndiyabanika"	4:21
3.	"Touch the Sky"	3:23
4.	"Khulula"	2:59
5.	"ATC"	3:40
6.	"BBAF"	3:14
7.	"Fort Hare" (featuring Maglera Doe Boy)	3:56
8.	"Suicide Doors" (featuring Frank Casino)	3:52
9.	"Note to Self" (featuring Tshego AMG)	3:05
10.	"Manelo"	3:52
11.	"Austin Powers" (featuring SaveMilli)	3:56
12.	"Bazenzile"	3:48
13.	"Delela"	4:34
14.	"Ngubani Lo." (featuring Thabsie)	4:22
15.	"Mkhwenyana"	7:00
Total length:		59:03
