= Ngiyeza =

Single by Lwah Ndlunkulu

from the album Imizwa
- Released: January 20, 2023
- Length: 4:41
- Label: Nkabi Records
- Songwriters: Lwandile Mtshali; Xolani Shabalala
- Producer: Xowla

Lwah Ndlunkulu singles chronology
"Ithuba" (2022)	"Ngiyeza" (2023)	"Eyami" (2023)

"Ngiyeza" is a single by a South African singer Lwah Ndlunkulu, released on January 20, 2023, through Nkabi Records. It was written by Lwandile Mtshali and Xolani Shabalala.

== Personnel ==
Credits for "Ngiyeza" are adapted from AllMusic.

- Lwah Ndlunkulu - Primary Artist
- Lwandile Mtshali - Composer
- Xolani Shabalala - Composer

== Track listing ==
- Digital download
1. "Ngiyeza" (Imizwa) – 4:41

== Awards ==
Awards and nominations for "Ngiyeza"
Organization	Year	Category	Result	Ref.
Basadi in Music Awards	2024	Capasso Most Streamed Song	Won	
South African Music Awards	2024	RAV Music Video of the Year	Nominated	

== Certifications ==
Region	Certification	Certified units/sales
South Africa (RISA)	Platinum	20,000^{‡}
^{‡} Sales+streaming figures based on certification alone.
