= Zoocci Coke Dope =

South African rapper

- Also known as: Zoocci
- Born: Sibabalwe Andile Fiphaza; 25 November 1993 (age 32)
- Origin: Pretoria, Gauteng, South Africa
- Genres: Hip-Hop
- Occupations: Record producer; rapper; singer; audio engineer
- Instruments: FL Studio; Cubase; Pro Tools; vocals
- Years active: 2012–present
- Labels: PiFF Audio; STAY LOW

Sibabalwe Andile Fiphaza (born 25 November 1993), professionally known as Zoocci Coke Dope (or simply Zoocci), is a South African record producer, rapper, singer, and audio engineer. Almost all of his productions begin with the tag "Zoocci Coke Dope! He's the dealer". Zoocci's debut album, Anxiety, was released on 25 November 2019. His follow-up album, Anxiety+, was released on 25 February 2022. He won the Producer of the Year award at the South African Hip Hop Awards 2021.

== Albums ==
=== Studio albums ===
List of studio albums, with selected chart positions and certifications
Title	Album details	Peak chart positions	Certifications
Title	Album details	ZA	Certifications
Anxiety	Released: 15 November 2019; Label: PiFF Audio; Formats: Digital download	—	
Anxiety+	Released: 25 February 2022; Label: PiFF Audio; Formats: Digital download	—	
"—" denotes a recording that did not chart or was not released in that territory.

=== Mixtapes ===
List of Mixtapes, with certifications
Title	Mixtape details	Certifications
Morning Star	Released: 11 August 2017; Label: PiFF Audio; Formats: Digital download	
Do Not Disturb (with Flvme)	Released: 8 May 2018; Label: PiFF Audio; Formats: Digital download	
Die Dope (with Die Mondez)	Released: 18 January 2019; Label: PiFF Audio; Formats: Digital download	RiSA: Gold

== Awards and nominations ==
Year	Award Ceremony	Prize	Work/Recipient	Result	Ref.
2017	South African Hip Hop Awards 2017	Mixtape of the year	Morning Star	Nominated	
2017	South African Hip Hop Awards 2017	Freshman of the year	Himself	Nominated	
2018	South African Hip Hop Awards 2018	Producer of The Year	Himself	Nominated	
2019	South African Hip Hop Awards 2019	Mixtape of the Year	Die Dope	Nominated	
2019	South African Hip Hop Awards 2019	Producer of the Year	Himself	Won	
2020	South African Hip Hop Awards 2020	Album of the Year	Anxiety	Won	
2020	South African Hip Hop Awards 2020	Producer of the Year	Himself	Won	
2021	South African Hip Hop Awards 2021	Producer of the Year	Himself	Won	
