= YoungstaCPT =

South African rapper

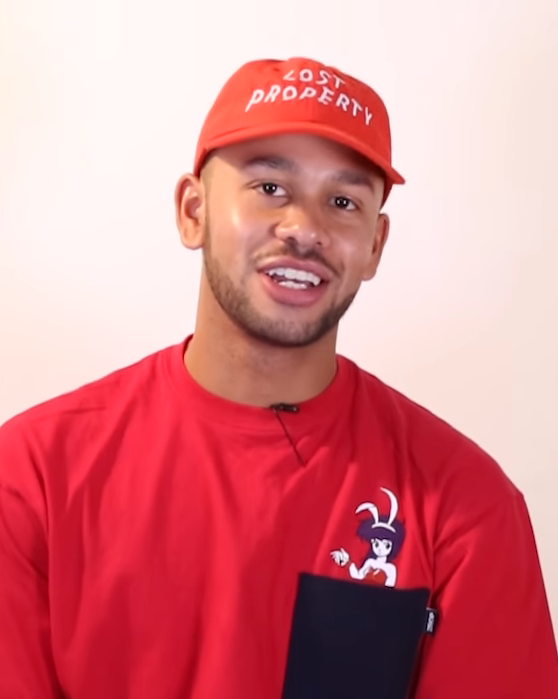
- YoungstaCPT in 2016

Background information
- Also known as: Youngsta Kaapstad
- Born: Riyadh Roberts; 22 December 1991 (age 34); Wynberg, Cape Town, Western Cape, South Africa
- Genres: Hip-hop
- Occupations: Rapper; singer; songwriter
- Years active: 2013–present
- Website: youngstacpt.com

Riyadh Roberts (born 22 December 1991), known professionally as YoungstaCPT (or simply YoungCPT or Youngsta Kaapstad), is a South African rapper, lyricist and songwriter from Wynberg. He is known for incorporating details about his Cape Malay culture and his Cape Town roots in his music. YoungstaCPT has been described as "one of the most outspoken South African emcees of this generation". He released his debut solo album 3T (Things Take Time) in March 2019, which won Album of The Year at the 2019 South African Hip Hop Awards. Prior to the release of 3T, YoungstaCPT had released 30 mixtapes, six extended plays and two collaborative albums since his debut in 2010.

In 2021, he landed his debut acting role on the second season of the Netflix series Blood & Water. For the record YoungCPT has praise song which is directed to him by Bushbuckridge based rapper Stevence released in 2020. The King of Cape Flats released two joint projects with Shaney Jay which are Suffer For Beauty & Dreams Don't Pay Bills respectively.

== Selected discography ==
=== Studio albums ===
- Dreams Don't Pay Bills (2021)
- 3T (2019)

=== Mixtapes ===
- The Cape of Good Hope (2016) – with Ganja Beatz
- Y?-Fi (2017) – with Maloon TheBoom
- Kaapstads Revenge (2017) – with J-Beatz
- How to Make It in South Africa (2017) with Loopsta
- Yungloon Taliboom (2018) – with Maloon TheBoom and Yungloon Taliboom
- To Be Continued (2018) – with Maloon TheBoom and Yungloon Taliboom
- Dreams Don't Pay Bills (2021) - With Shaney Jay
- Suffer For Beauty (2023) - With Shaney Jay

== Personal life ==
YoungstaCPT is a Coloured Muslim of Cape Malay descent whose music is inspired by his Muslim roots and Cape Malay culture.

== Awards and nominations ==
Year	Award	Category	Nominated work	Result	Ref.
2019	South African Hip Hop Awards	Album of the Year	3T	Won	
2019	South African Hip Hop Awards	Video of the Year	"YVR (Young Van Riebeeck)"	Won	
2019	South African Hip Hop Awards	Video of the Year	"Ho$h" – (Priddy Ugly featuring Wichi 1080 and YoungstaCPT)	Nominated	
2019	South African Hip Hop Awards	Lyricist of the Year	Himself	Nominated	
2019	South African Hip Hop Awards	Male of the Year	Himself	Nominated	
2019	South African Hip Hop Awards	Remix of the Year	"Yeah Rmx" (DJ D Double D featuring AKA, Da L.E.S and YoungstaCPT)	Nominated	
2018	South African Music Awards	Remix of the Year	"Buy it Out" (Riky Rick featuring YoungstaCPT, KLY, Da L.E.S, Frank Casino, J Molley and Stilo Magolide)	Nominated	
2019	South African Music Awards	Remix of the Year	"Skebe Dep Dep" (DJ Capital featuring Kwesta, Kid X, Reason, YoungstaCPT and Stogie T)	Nominated	

== See also ==
- List of South African musicians
- Cape Coloureds
