= Ichwane Lenyoka =

Studio album by Big Zulu
- Released: 3 September 2021
- Genre: Hip hop; rap
- Label: Nkabi Records
- Producer: Gobi Beast; Ndu Browns; Xola; Lazarus Nyashanu; Thabiso Manama; CeLza

Big Zulu chronology
Ungqongqoshe Wongqongqoshe (2019)	Ichwane Lenyoka (2021)	Ngises' Congweni (2024)

Singles from Ichwane Lenyoka
- 1. "Mali Eningi" Released: 20 November 2020; 2. "Inhlupheko" Released: 11 March 2021; 3. "Umuzi eSandton" Released: 9 July 2021

Ichwane Lenyoka is the third studio album by South African rapper Big Zulu. It was released by Nkabi Records on 3 September 2021 in South Africa. The album features Mduduzi Ncube, Lwah Ndlunkulu, ProKid, Xola, Kwazi, Cofi, Nhlanhla Mhlongo, Ami Faku, Siya Ntuli, Samthing Soweto, Sjava, Aubrey Qwana, Mnqobi Yazo, Zuluboy, Intaba Yase Dubai and Riky Rick.

The album debuted number 1 in South Africa.

== Background ==
Zulu announced album via his Twitter account on January 20, 2021.

== Singles ==
"Mali Eningi" (featuring South African singer Ntaba Yase Dubai and South African rapper Riky Rick) was released in South Africa on 20 November 2020 as the album's lead single.

The second single, "Inhlupheko" (featuring South African singer Mduduzi Ncube), was released on 11 March 2021. The song reached number 1 on the SA iTunes charts.

Third single "Umuzi eSandton" featuring Lwah Ndlunkulu, was released on July 9, 2021.

== Track listing ==
Ichwane Lenyoka tracklisting
No.	Title	Length
1.	"Ichwane Lenyoka"	4:47
2.	"Ivikela Mbuso"	4:21
3.	"Ivolovolo (featuring Xowla)"	5:07
4.	"Inhlupheko (featuring Mduduzi Ncube)"	5:17
5.	"Ubaba Ulala Nam (featuring Kwazi, Cofi and Nhlanhla Mhlongo)"	6:44
6.	"Ukube Kuya Ngami (featuring Ami Faku)"	4:57
7.	"Baba Ngiyakhumbula"	5:27
8.	"Inkabi Awuna Nembheza"	4:51
9.	"Yakhala iPhone (featuring Siya Ntuli)"	3:18
10.	"iStradi (featuring PRO Kid)"	3:51
11.	"Umbonge (featuring Samthing Soweto)"	5:16
12.	"Umuzi eSandton (featuring Lwah Ndlunkulu)"	4:10
13.	"Ibele (featuring Aubrey Qwana)"	4:22
14.	"Ngaqoma Ibhinca (featuring Sjava)"	4:31
15.	"Type Yam (featuring Mnqobi Yazo)"	5:01
16.	"Ushun' Wenkabi"	4:17
17.	"Khala Mabhinca (featuring Zuluboy and Leverage)"	4:17
18.	"Ngiphilele"	4:02
19.	"Mali Eningi (featuring Riky Rick & Intaba Yase Dubai)"	4:30
20.	"Dear PRO (featuring RED BUTTON and Touchline)"	3:40

== Accolades ==
At the 2021 South African Hip Hop Awards, Ichwane Lenyoka won Album of the Year and Best Male.

Year	Nominee / work	Award	Result
2021	Ichwane Lenyoka	Album of the Year	Won
2021	Ichwane Lenyoka	Best Male	Won

== Commercial performance ==
Ichwane Lenyoka debuted number one on iTunes Hip hop/rap charts.

== Certifications and sales ==
Region	Certification	Certified units/Sales
South Africa (RiSA)	Gold	10 000+

== Personnel ==
All credits are adapted from Genius and AllMusic.

- Big Zulu – vocals, writer (all tracks)
- Ami Faku – vocals, writer (track 6)
- Samthing Soweto – vocals, writer (track 11)
- Zuluboy – vocals, writer (track 17)
- Sjava – writer, vocals (track 14)
- Lwah Ndlunkulu – vocals, writer (track 11)
- Gobi Beast - producer (tracks 1, 2, 4, 5, 7, 8, 9, 11, 13, 14, 15, 16, 18, 20)
- Lazarus Nyashanu – producer (track 19)
- CeLza – producer (track 12)
- Thabiso Manama – producer (track 10)
- Ndu Browns – producer (track 6)
- Xola – producer (track 3)

== Release history ==
List of release dates, showing region, formats, label, editions and reference
Region	Date	Format(s)	Label	Edition(s)	Ref.
South Africa	3 September 2021	CD; digital download; Streaming	Inkabi Records	Standard	
