= Azana (singer) =

South African singer

- Born: Makhosazana Princess Masango; 13 September 2000 (age 25); Chesterville, KwaZulu-Natal, South Africa
- Genres: Afro-pop
- Occupations: Singer; songwriter
- Instrument: Vocals
- Label: Big City Dreams

Makhosazana Princess Masango (born 13 September 2000), professionally known as Azana is a South African singer and songwriter. Born and raised in Chesterville, her musical career began at the age of 15. Having signed a record deal with Big City Dreams, Azana's debut studio album Ingoma (2020), debuted number one in South Africa. Its lead single "Your Love" was certified double platinum by the Recording Industry of South Africa (RiSA).

== Career ==
In early April 2020, Azana was collaborated on a single "Uhuru" by South African DJ Sun-El Musician.

Her breakthrough single "Your Love" was released in May 2020, produced by Taffy Da Don. The song was commercial success certified double platinum by the Recording industry of South Africa (RiSA).

Her debut studio album Ingoma was released on 17 July 2020. The album peaked at number 1 on Apple Music Pop Chart. It features Afriikan Papi, Disciples of House, and Sun-El Musician.

At the 27th ceremony of South African Music Awards Ingoma was nominated for Best Afro Pop Album and Newcomer of the Year.

She made collaboration on Platoon's compilation album African Lullabies Part 1, in October 2021.

Azana's single "Higher" was released on 3 December 2021.

In early August 2023, Azana announced her studio album Igagu. The album was released on October 27, 2023.

Azana and Sam Deep released their collaborative extended play Kwakhanya, on June 7, 2024.

== Discography ==
=== Studio albums ===
- Ingoma (2020)
- Uhuru (2021)
- Igagu (2023)
- Kwakhanya (2024)

=== As lead artist ===
List of singles as lead artist, with selected chart positions and certifications, showing year released and album name
Title	Year	Peak chart positions	Certifications	Album
Title	Year	ZA	Certifications	Album
"Ngize Ngifike" (featuring Sun-El Musician)	2020	—	RiSA: Gold	Ingoma
"Your Love"	2020	—	RiSA: 2× Platinum	Ingoma
"Nguwe" (Azana and Lowsheen)	2023	—		Non-album single
"Shona Malanga" (featuring Amahle)	2023	—		Igagu
"Sifanelene" (Azana, Mthunzi)	2023	—		Igagu
"Never The Same"	2023	—		Igagu
"For a Reason" (Azana, Major League DJz)	2024	—		Non-album single
"Love" (Azana, Mpho.Wav)	2024	—		Book of Wav
"Shona Phansi"	2024	—		Non-album single
"Amacala Othando" (Big Zulu, Azana, Malungelo)	2025	—		Non-album single
"Bawo" (Ntokzin, Azana, De Mthuda)	2025	—		Non-album single
"—" denotes a recording that did not chart or was not released in that territory.

=== As featured artist ===
List of singles as featured artist, with selected chart positions and certifications, showing year released and album name
Title	Year	Peak chart positions	Certifications	Album
Title	Year	ZA	Certifications	Album
"Inkumbulo" (Prince Kaybee featuring Azana)	2023	—		Music Theory
"Amaphiko Ezono" (Prince Kaybee featuring Azana)	2023	—		Music Theory
"Yena Forever" (King Monada featuring Azana, Mack Eaze)	2023	—		Non-album single
"—" denotes a recording that did not chart or was not released in that territory.

=== Guest appearances ===
Title	Year	Other artist(s)	Album
"Calling"	2026	Kenza, Claudio Wade, Omi Kobi	Music in Colors
"Safe and Sound"	2026	Frigid Armadillo	The Light

== Other charted and certified songs ==
List of other charted songs, with selected chart positions and certifications, showing year released and album name
Title	Year	Peak chart positions	Certifications	Album
Title	Year	ZA	Certifications	Album
"BoGogo" (Azana, Sam Deep)	2024	8		Kwakhanya
"—" denotes a recording that did not chart or was not released in that territory.
