= South African Hip Hop Awards 2019 =

- Date: 20 November 2019
- Location: Lyric Theatre, Gold Reef City Casino; Johannesburg, Gauteng
- Country: South Africa
- Presented by: SABC 1
- Website: www.sahiphopawards.com

Television/radio coverage
- Network: SABC

The 2019 South African Hip Hop Awards were held at The Lyric Theatre, Gold Reef City Casino in Johannesburg, Gauteng Province. This marked the ceremony's 8th anniversary.

The nominees were announced on 29 October 2019.

== Nominations and winners ==
The following is a list of nominees. The winners were initially announced on 20 November 2019 at the ceremony.

Album of The Year	Best Collaboration
Kid X – Thank Da King; Big Zulu – Ungqongqoshe Wongqongqoshe; Candyman – Candyman Flame; YoungstaCPT – 3T; Nadia Nakai – Nadia Naked	Riky Rick – You & I; featuring Mlindo the Vocalist; Gemini Major – Right Now; featuring Nasty C & Tellaman; Sjava – Hello; featuring Beast; K.O – Say You Will; featuring Nandi Madida; DJ Speedsta – No Stress featuring Zoocci Coke Dope, Una Rams & Da L.E.S
Best Male	Best Female
Kid X; Flame; Big Zulu; The Big Hash; YoungstaCPT	Nadia Nakai; Gigi Lamayne; Bizzcuit; Assessa
Freshman of the Year	MVP/Hustler of the Year
Young – The Big Hash; Candyman – Flame; 18 Flow – Touchline; Jimmy Wiz – Accordin' to Jim; PatricKxxLee – Nowhere Child	Cassper Nyovest; Nadia Nakai; Nasty C; Kwesta; Riky Rick
Best International Brand	Best Local Brand
Power Play; Sportscene; Castle Lite; Russian Bear Vodka	Baps; StylaGang Original Designs; Butan wear; Y?Gen Apparel
Promoter of the Year	Mixtape of the Year
Pop Bottles; Cotton Fest; The Ivyson Tour; Durban Varsity fest; Fill Up	Gigi Lamayne – Job Woods; Shane Eagle – Never Grow Up; DJ Speedsta – BottlebrushStr; Die Mondez & Zoocci Coke Dope – Die Dope; Touch line – 18 Flow
Best Radio Show	DJ of the Year
YFM – SA Hip Hop Live; Ukhozi FM – iNumba Numba; Ligwalagwala FM – Hip Hop parliament; Good Hope FM – The Ready D Show; Metro FM – Absolute Hip Hop; Massiv Metro – The Element; Motsweding FM – Motswako wa Hip Hop; Gagazi FM – The Fresh Cut; YFM – The Rodeo; 5FM – The Stir Up	DJ Speedsta; DJ Akio; DJ PH; DJ Zan D; Ms Cosmo
Hennessy Honorary Award	Ubuntu Activism
Falko Graffiti Artist	EmileYx
Producer of the Year	Lyricist of the Year
Makwa Beats; Gemini Major; 808x; Zoocci Coke Dope	Jimmy Wiz; YoungstaCPT; Reason; Ginger Trill; PdotO
Song of the Year	Video of the Year
K.O – Supa Dupa; Yanga Chief – Utatako; Kwesta featuring Makwa, Tshego AMG and Thee Legacy – Khethile Khethile; Riky Rick featuring Mlindo the Vocalist – You & I; Big Zulu - Ama Million featuring MusiholiQ and Cassper Nyovest; Gemini Major featuring Nasty C and Tellaman – Right Now; DJ Speedsta featuring Zoocci Coke Dope, Una Rams and Da L.E.S – No Stress; Beast featuring Sjava – Hello; Kwesta – Vur Vai; K.O featuring Nandi Madida – Say You Will	YoungstaCPT – YVR; Vato Kayde featuring AKA and Gator – Lost Hills’; K.O – Supa Dupa; Priddy Ugly featuring Wichi 1080 & YoungstaCPT – Hosh; Frank Casino featuring Cassper Nyovest and Major League DJz – Sudden

Best Remix

- Yanga Chief featuring Kwesta - Juju Remix (Yuri x KingP)
- Zaddy Swag featuring DJ Capital, Touchline, Emtee, PdotO, AB Crazy, Red Button and Big Star Johnson - Warrior (Remix)
- Shane Eagle - Ap3x (Remastered) featuring Bas
- DJ D Double D featuring AKA, Da L.E.S and YoungstaCPT - Yeah (Remix)
- 25K featuring Emtee and AKA - Culture Vulture (Remix)
