= Family Values (album) =

Studio album by Riky Rick
- Released: 3 April 2015
- Recorded: 2011–15
- Genre: Hip hop
- Length: 74:51
- Label: Makhado Makhado Agency
- Producer: Riky Rick; Leagan Breda; Lwazi Nonyukela; Ganja Beatz; DJ Sneja; Black Motion; Muzi; Takunda Muusha

Singles from Family Values
- 1. "Amantombazane" Released: 11 November 2013; 2. "Nafukwa (Fok Julle Naaiers)" Released: 19 May 2014; 3. "Boss Zonke" Released: 26 October 2014; 4. "Sondela" Released: 17 April 2016

Family Values is the only studio album by South African rapper, actor, writer, composer and record producer Riky Rick. It was released and made available for purchase on iTunes by Makhado Makhado Agency on 3 April 2015. It features guest appearances from Cassper Nyovest, Okmalumkoolkat, Zano and Black Motion. Family Values was certified Platinum by the Recording Industry of South Africa (RiSA).

== Background and recording ==
Riky Rick speaking on the album's title:

I chose to call it Family Values as this is a passionate reflection of my evolution as producer and rapper. A lot has happened in my life both professionally and personally and this album narrates those changes through music.

During interviews, Riky Rick mentioned that he had produced 80 percent of the album. He mentioned that there were only four guest appearances on his album. In March 2015, Riky previewed snippets of the songs "A Time to Love", "Makaveli" and "Sondela". He stated that "Sondela" would be the next official single from the album. Prior to this, Riky had released three singles "Amantombazane", "Nafukwa (Fok Julle Naaiers)" and "Boss Zonke" which all gained mainstream recognition.

Riky Rick revealed the album's cover in February 2015 via various social media platforms, including Instagram. The cover which was shot by Kristin-Lee Moolman, depicts Riky Rick embracing his son, Maik Makhado. The artwork which bears a huge resemblance to an old picture of American rapper Game and his son Harlem Taylor, drew criticism from the public, with some labeling Riky Rick a copycat.

Black Motion, which worked with Riky on the album stated, "When we got into studio we created music. We started harmonising one melody and that melody was music". Family Values was billed by OkMzansi as "one of the most anticipated hip hop albums of 2015". It was made available for iTunes pre-order on 27 February 2015, revealing the album's 18-song tracklist.

Media personnel were invited for a listening session held at Riky's house on 31 March 2015. The album's release party was held three days later.

== Singles ==
The album singles "Amantombazane", "Boss Zonke" and "Nafukwa (Fok Julle Naaiers). In an interview with Slikour, Riky Rick stated that the album's fourth single would be "Sondela", saying that it was sonically different from his previous singles. He later performed the single with Zano on Live Amp on 3 April 2015.

== Track listing ==
No.	Title	Writer(s)	Producer(s)	Length
1.	"Intro"	Rikhado Makhado	Riky Rick	2:39
2.	"A Time to Love"	Makhado, P De Menezes	Riky Rick	3:29
3.	"Wonder Years"	Makhado	Riky Rick	4:32
4.	"Makaveli"	Makhado	Takunda Muusha	3:56
5.	"Boss Zonke"	Makhado	Riky Rick	4:00
6.	"Interlude"	Makhado	Riky Rick	0:20
7.	"Papa Song"	Makhado	Leagan Breda	5:31
8.	"Love We Had" (Interlude)	Makhado	Riky Rick	1:27
9.	"Sondela" (featuring Zano)	Makhado; Thokozani Nzima	Lwazi Nonyukela	4:34
10.	"Come Alive" (featuring Cassper Nyovest and Okmalumkoolkat)	Makhado; Refiloe Maele Phoolo; Smiso Zwane	Riky Rick; Muzi	4:29
11.	"Thuglife"	Makhado	Riky Rick	5:08
12.	"94 / It's Getting Worse"	Makhado	Riky Rick	3:53
13.	"Bambalela" (featuring Black Motion)	Makhado; Thabo Mabogwane; Bongani Mohosana	Black Motion	5:23
14.	"Gone, Pt. 3"	Makhado	Riky Rick	8:30
15.	"Shining"	Makhado	DJ Sneja	4:38
16.	"Till I Die (Outro)"	Makhado	Riky Rick	7:49
17.	"Nafukwa (Fok Julle Naaiers)"	Makhado	Ganja Beatz	4:08
18.	"Amantombazane" (featuring Okmalumkoolkat)	Makhado; Smiso Zwane	Riky Rick	3:45
Total length:				74:51

== Certifications and sales ==
Region	Certification	Certified units/sales
South Africa (RISA)	Platinum	55,298
