= Nadia Nakai =

South African rapper (born 1990)

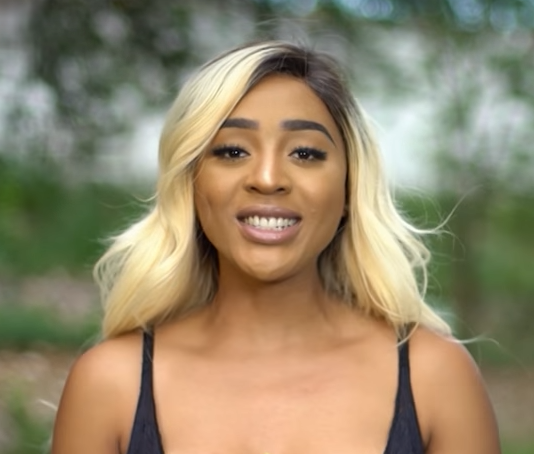
- Photo on a preview of MTV Shuga Down South in 2019

Background information
- Born: Nadia Nakai Dlamini; 18 May 1990 (age 36); South Africa
- Origin: Johannesburg
- Citizenship: South Africa Zimbabwe
- Genre: Hip-hop
- Occupations: TV personality; rapper
- Years active: 2011–present
- Partner: AKA (died 2023)
- Labels: Def Jam Africa (current); Bragga Records (current); Family Tree Records (former); Sid Records (former)

Nadia Nakai Kandava (né Dlamini; born 18 May 1990), (Note: First source specify that she celebrated her 31st birthday, and the article was published in 2021, the second sources states that she celebrated her 30th birthday and the article was published in 2020, which possibly justify that she was born in 1990) is a South African rapper and television personality.

== Early life and education ==
Nakai was born in South Africa. Her father is South African and her mother is Zimbabwean. When she was 16 years old, her surname was changed from her father's to her mother's.

Nakai attended Fourways High School in Johannesburg for a year then finished her schooling in Kenya. She later studied a degree in marketing, communication, and media studies at Monash University, Johannesburg.

== Career ==
=== 2013–2017: Beginnings ===
Nakai made her first television appearance on the e.tv hip-hop show Shiz Niz where she won the Mixtape 101 competition, making her the first female to win the competition. She then rose to prominence in September 2013, when she released her debut single "Like Me". The following year, she was featured on the remix of Riky Rick song, Amantombazane amongst various South African acts. In June 2015, Nakai released her third single "Saka Wena" featuring rapper Ice Prince, following her second single, "Whatever" featuring DotCom and Psyfo.

In August 2016, Nakai pre-released her single "The Man" featuring Cassper Nyovest from her EP, Bragga. Bragga was then released on 15 September 2016. In November 2017, Nakai released her critically acclaimed single "Naaa Meaan" featuring Cassper Nyovest. The song topped charts in several radio stations in South Africa. On 4 November 2016, she hosted the red carpet special for MTV Africa at the 2018 MTV Europe Music Awards.

=== 2017–2020: Nadia Naked, and Def Jam Africa ===
In 2019, Nakai co-hosted the MTV Base hip-hop show, Yo! MTV Raps South Africa alongside television presenter Siyabonga Ngwekazi. On 3 May 2019, Nakai confirmed that her debut album Nadia Naked would be released on 28 June 2019. On 18 May 2019, "Imma Boss" was released as the third single accompanied by the album's artwork cover. On 15 October 2020, she released a documentary on Showmax about the making of the album Nadia Naked. In May 2020, she signed a record deal with Def Jam Africa.

At the 6th ceremony of AFRIMA, she took-home Best Female Artist award. She was awarded the most stylish performing artist at the 2020 SA Style Awards.

=== 2021–present: TV shows ===
In 2021, Nakai hosted the first season of Channel O's Gen-Z South Africa television show. In June 2021, she left Family Tree Records to pursue her own label. At the 2021 South African Hip Hop Awards, Nakai received a nomination for Artist of the Decade.

In 2022, Nakai appeared on the Netflix original reality show Young, Famous & African as part of an affluent group of "A-list media personalities."

== Influences ==
Nakai was inspired by a female Kenyan rapper, Nazizi, who she met while she was staying in Kenya. She said that Nazizi influenced her in starting her rapping career.

== Personal life ==
She was in a relationship with the late South African rapper AKA.

== Awards and nominations ==
Award	Year	Recipient(s) and nominee(s)	Category	Result	Ref.
Zimbabwe Achievers Awards	2016	Herself	Music Artist of the Year	Won	
Metro FM Music Awards	2016	Baddest (Remix) (with AKA, Fifi Cooper, Rouge & Gigi LaMayne)	Best Remix	Nominated	
Metro FM Music Awards	2016	Do I Like I Do (Remix) (with DJ Sliqe, Riky Rick, Reason, L-Tido, Kwesta & Flabba)	Best Remix	Nominated	
South African Music Awards	2018	Naa Meaan (feat. Cassper Nyovest) (Directed by Family Tree)	Music Video of the Year	Nominated	
South African Music Awards	2021	Nadia Naked	Best Hip Hop Album	Nominated	
South African Hip Hop Awards	2019	Nadia Naked	Album of the Year	Nominated	
South African Hip Hop Awards	2019	Herself	Best Female	Won	
South African Hip Hop Awards	2019	Herself	MVP/Hustler of the Year	Nominated	
South African Hip Hop Awards	2020	Herself	MVP/Hustler of the Year	Nominated	
South African Hip Hop Awards	2020	40 Bars (featuring Emtee & DJ Capital) Directed by Kaykayribane	Best Video	Nominated	
South African Hip Hop Awards	2020	More Drugs (featuring Tshego) Directed Allesio Bettocchi & Jilten Ramlal	Best Video	Won	
South African Hip Hop Awards	2021	Herself	Artist of the Decade	Nominated	
All Africa Music Awards	2019	Nadia Naked	Album of the Year in Southern Africa	Nominated	
All Africa Music Awards	2019	Herself	Best Female Artiste in Southern Africa	Won	
All Africa Music Awards	2019	Herself	Best Artiste, Duo or Group in African Hip Hop	Won	
SA Style Awards	2021	Herself	Most Stylish Performing Artist	Won	
Basadi in Music Awards	2023	Herself	Hip Hop Artist of the Year	Won	

== Discography ==
=== Studio album ===
Studio album
Title	Extended play details
Nadia Naked	Released: 28 June 2019; Label: Family Tree Records; Format: Digital download

=== Extended Play ===
Extended play
Title	Extended play details
Bragga	Released: 15 September 2016; Label: Family Tree Records; Format: Digital download

=== Singles ===
==== As lead artist ====
List of singles, showing year released and album name
Title	Year	Album	
Title	Year	Album	Certification
"Like Me"	2013		
"Whatever" (featuring DotCom and Psyfo)	2014		
"Saka Wena" (featuring Ice Prince)	2015		
"Money Back"	2016		
"The Man" (featuring Cassper Nyovest)	2016	Bragga	
"Don't Cut It"	2016	Bragga	
"Sqwaa" (featuring Gemini Major and Tshego)	2016		
"Naaa Meaan" (featuring Cassper Nyovest)	2017	Nadia Naked	
"Money Calling" (with Frank Casino)	2018		
"Yass Bitch"	2018	Nadia Naked	
"Imma Boss"	2019	Nadia Naked	
"Kreatures" (featuring Kwesta & Sio)	2019	Nadia Naked	
"40 Bars" (featuring Emtee & DJ Capital)	2020	Nadia Naked (Deluxe)	

==== As featured artist ====
List of featured singles, showing year released and album name
Title	Year	Album	
Title	Year	Album	Certification
"Amantombazane Remix" (Riky Rick featuring Okmalumkoolkat, Maggz, Kwesta, Ginger Breadman, Kid X, Nadia Nakai and DJ Dimplez)	2014		RiSA: Gold
"Do Like I Do Remix" (DJ Sliqe featuring Riky Rick, L-Tido, Kwesta, Reason, Flabba and Nadia Nakai)	2015	Injayam, Vol. 1	
"Sugar Free" (Tumi featuring Nadia Nakai)	2015		
"Ragga Ragga" (Gemini Major featuring Cassper Nyovest, Nadia Nakai, Riky Rick and Major League)	2016		
"Savage" (DJ Milkshake featuring Da L.E.S, Maggz and Nadia Nakai)	2016		
"Crazy" (Spectacular and DJ Naves featuring Floda, Nadia Nakai and DJ Tira)	2017		
Isaga Lam (Miss Pru DJ featuring LaSauce, Gigi LaMayne, Nadia Nakai and Londie London)	2017		
Uh Huh (Priddy Ugly featuring Nadia Nakai)	2017		
Zonke (Phantom Steeze featuring Sjava, AKA, Nadia Nakai, Robot Boii, Buzzi Lee and Mustbedubz)	2022		
