= South African Hip Hop Awards 2020 =

2020 Award show

- Date: 12 December 2020
- Location: Virtual event; multiple venues
- Country: South Africa
- Presented by: Ritual Media Group (RMG)
- Website: www.sahiphopawards.com

Television/radio coverage
- Network: SABC 1

The 2020 South African Hip Hop Awards took place on December 12, 2020 and were the 9th edition of the South African Hip Hop Awards. The ceremony celebrates achievements in entertainment and honors music. Themed "The New World Order", the theme idea came from the hard lockdown experience which resulted in people being confined at their homes, glued to their TV sets, computers and being on social media sites such as Twitter, Facebook and Instagram on their phones. It was held virtually due to the effects of the COVID-19 pandemic lockdowns.

The nominees were announced on 16 November 2020 Cassper Nyovest received the most nominations with 7, ahead of Nasty C and PdotO. The ceremony was hosted by actor and presenter Uncle Vinny.

== Winners and nominees ==
The following is a list of winners and nominees. The winners are in Bold and were initially announced on 12 December 2020 at the ceremony.

Album of the Year	Song of the Year
**AMN (Any Minute Now) – Cassper Nyovest**; Zulu Man With Some Power – Nasty C; Planet of the Have Nots – Khuli Chana; Anxiety – Zoocci Coke Dope; Lost Diamonds – Blaklez & PdotO	**Cassper Nyovest – "Good For That"**; Yanga Chief featuring Ricky Rick, Boity & Dee Koala – "Utatakho Remix"; Kwesta featuring Rich Hommie Quan – "Run it Up"; Nasty C – "There They Go"; Miss Pru DJ featuring Blaq Diamond & Malome Vector – "Price to Pay"; AKA – "Energy"; Cassper Nyovest featuring Tweezy – "Amademoni"; Costa Titch featuring Ricky Rick & AKA – "Nkalakatha Remix"; Nasty C – "Eazy"; Dr Peppa featuring Chang Cello, Lucasraps & Riky Rick - "What it is"
Mixtape of the Year	Best Collaboration
**Yanga Chief – Becoming a Pop Star**; Stogie T – "The Empire of Sheep"; Nasty C – "Zulu"; Touchline – "19 Flow"; DJ Sliqe – "Injayam Vol.2"	**Costa Titch featuring AKA & Riky Rick - "Nkalakhata Remix"**; Cassper Nyovest featuring Tweezy - "Amademoni"; Yanga Chief featuring Riky Rick, Dee Koala & Boity - "Utatakho Remix"; Dr peppa featuring Chang Cello, Lucasraps & Riky Rick - "What it is"; Kwesta featuring Rich Homie Quan - "Run it Up"
Best Female	Best Male
**Dee Koala**; MsSupa; Indigo Stella; Bizzcuit	**Cassper Nyovest**; Nasty C; PdotO; Khuli Chana; Blaklez
Best Video	Best Remix
**Nadia Nakai featuring Tshego - "More Drugs" (Directed Allesio Bettocchi & Jilten Ramlal)**; Nadia Nakai featuring Emtee & DJ Capital - "40 Bars" (Directed by Kaykayribane); DJ Slique featuring Kwesta - "Njandini" (Directed by Nate Thomas); Nasty C - "Eazy" (Directed by Allison Swank); Nasty C - "Palm Trees" (Directed by Kyle Lewis)	**Yanga Chief featuring Riky Rick, Dee Koala & Boity - "Utatakho Remix"**; Blaklez featuring Emtee, Zakwe, Tshego & Jay Hood - "DMX Prayer Remix"; Big Zulu featuring Zakwe, YoungstaCPT, MusiholiQ & Kwesta - "Ama Million Remix"; Costa Titch featuring AKA & Riky Rick - "Nkalakhata Remix"; Cassper Nyovest featuring HHP, Khuli Chana, Mo' Molemi, Towdee Mac, Tuks & DJ Lemonka - "Nyuku Remix"
Freshman of the Year	MVP/Hustler of the Year
**Focalistic**; Indigo Stella; Dee Koala; QuickFassss; Benny Chill	**Riky Rick**; Cassper Nyovest; Nadia Nakai; Nasty C; DJ PH
Producer of the Year	Lyricist of the Year
**Tweezy**; Gemini Major; Alie Keyz; Zoocci Coke dope; MustbeDubz	**Stogie T**; Landmarq; Hymphatic Thabz; Ginger Trill; PdotO
Best Local Brand	Best International Brand
**Skhanda World**; StylaGang Original Designs; Butanwear; Baps	**Sportscene**; Remy Martin; Castle Lite; Russian Bear Vodka
DJ of the Year	Best Radio Show
**DJ PH**; DJ Speedsta; DJ Dimplez; DJ PH; DJ Sliqe; Ms Cosmo	**Good Hope FM – The Ready D Show**; Massiv Metro – The Urban Exchange; Alex FM – Mixtape Show; Ukhozi FM — INambaNamba; Metro FM – Absolut Hip Hop; Massiv Metro – The Urban Exchange; Motsweding FM – Rap Saga; Gagasi FM – Hip Hop Music Session; YFM – The Rodeo; 5FM – The Stir Up
Ubuntu Activism	Honorary Award
**Enzo Slaghuis**	**Prophets of da City**
