= Moozlie =

- Born: Nomuzi Mabena; 22 September 1992 (age 33); Benoni, Gauteng, South Africa
- Genre: Hip Hop
- Occupations: Rapper; television presenter
- Instrument: Vocals
- Years active: Television personality: 2012–present; Rapper: 2015–present; Model: ?.–present
- Labels: Cashtime (former); Nomuzi Mabena Music
- Website: www.moozlie.com

Nomuzi Mabena (born 22 September 1992), professionally known as Moozlie, is a South African rapper and television presenter. Born in Benoni, Gauteng, she won the MTV VJ Search for the year 2012.

== Early life ==
Nomuzi was born on 22 September 1992. She grew up in Rynfield, Daveyton, a small suburb on the East Rand of Gauteng. She was raised by her mom and dad and she also has an older sister. She went to school at St Dunstan's College in Benoni, where she went on to matriculate.

After matriculation, she enrolled at the Varsity College in Sandton for a Bachelor of Arts in Communication Sciences. She left the college after being selected by MTV Base VJ Search in 2012 to focus on her career in entertainment.

== Career ==
=== 2012-2016: MTV VJ Search and Nomuzi Mabena Music ===
On October 20, 2012, Nomuzi won the MTV Base VJ Search, and joined MTV Base as a VJ. In April 2016, Moozlie left MTV Base and went on to join VUZU and Channel O Africa.

In 2016, Nomuzi left Cashtime Life records which she had joined in 2014. She was featured on Rouge's song "Mbongo Zaka".

Nomuzi was chosen as one of the new presenters for Vuzu's flagship show, V Entertainment the same year. The show stopped airing in July 2017. She started her own record label, Nomuzi Mabena Music the same year, under the management of SBR Projects Agency.

=== 2017-present: Versus and Victory ===
In October 2017, she released her debut mixtape, named Versus. The mixtape was supported by 3 singles which are "Recipe", "Getting Cash" and "Bum Bum" featuring Gemini Major.

As of 2018 she returned as a presenter revival for the VUZU Amp (currently 1Magic) flagship show "V Entertainment" alongside Somizi Mhlongo.

On 7 September 2018, she released her debut album, "Victory". The album is supported by its lead single, "Vatela" featuring Kid X.

In early 2019, Nomuzi partnered with Volkswagen SA and Drive Dry in making an awareness campaign which deals with reducing texting and driving. The campaign was supported by a shocking and controversial video which shows Moozlie doing an Instagram live update then gets into an apparent car crash. The video was released before the public became aware of the campaign which led to consternation on social media.

== Discography ==
=== Studio albums ===
List of studio albums, with selected information
| Title | Album details |
|---|---|
| Victory | Released: 7 September 2018; Label: Nomuzi Mabena Music; Formats: Digital download |
| Spirit Of An OG | Released: 18 December 2020; Label: Nomuzi Mabena Music; Formats: Digital download |

=== Mixtape ===
List of mixtape
| Title | Mixtape details |
|---|---|
| Versus | Released: 15 June 2017; Label: Nomuzi Mabena Music; Format: Digital download |

=== Singles ===
List of singles
| Title | Year | Album |
|---|---|---|
| "Don't Panic" (with DJ Speedsta) | 2015 | The Guy: Episode 1 - Season 23 |
| "Recipe" | 2017 | Versus |
| "Getting Cash" | 2018 | Versus |
| "Bum Bum" (featuring Gemini Major) | 2018 | Versus |
| "Vatel" (featuring Kid X) | 2018 | Victory |
| "Swipe" (featuring Gemini Major) | 2018 | Victory |
