= Rouge (rapper) =

Congolese rapper (born 1992)

- Born: Deko Barbara-Jessica Wedi; 13 September 1992 (age 34); Pretoria, Gauteng, South Africa
- Origin: Pretoria
- Genre: Hip Hop
- Occupations: Rapper; Singer; Author; Television Presenter
- Instrument: Vocals
- Years active: 2013–present
- Labels: Sony Music; Warner Music South Africa

Deko Barbara-Jessica Wedi (born 13 September 1992), professionally known as Rouge (/ruˈʒ/), is a South African rapper of Congolese heritage, born in Pretoria. Her debut album The New Era Sessions, accompanied by a short film, received a South African Film and Television Award for Best Micro Budget Film.

== Early life ==
Deko Barbara-Jessica Wedi was born on September 13, 1992, in Pretoria, Gauteng. She is of DR Congolese descent as both her parents were born in Congo. She started songwriting at the age of 12, which resulted in her taking part in acting, public speaking and poetry. She started rapping at the age of 19, when her friend suggested she should rap to her own R&B songs she composed. She attended the University of Pretoria, where she completed her degree in Drama & Film.

== Career ==
=== 2014–2016: Beginnings ===
In December 2014, Rouge released her second single "Mi Corazon" featuring rapper BigStar Johnson, following her debut single, "Party". The following year, rapper AKA featured Rouge alongside other female rappers in the remix of his song "Baddest". As for 2016, Rouge then released the song "Mbongo Zaka" featuring Moozlie. The song gained her prominence as it was her first song to top charts on all major radio stations across South Africa.

Rouge was listed as one of six best female rappers in Africa by hip hop website Creative-hiphop in 2017, alongside fellow South African Nadia Nakai and Ghanaian rapper Eno Barony.

In October 2016, Rouge was one of the mentors on the Vuzu reality game show The Coalition, which involves interns undergoing challenges with the assistance of the mentors. She also participated on the MTV Base Cyphers in the "New Skool" (2017).

=== 2017–present: The New Era Sessions ===
The New Era Sessions was released on September 8, 2017, which debuted no. 2 on the local iTunes charts. On September 15, 2017, she premiered the short film for the album as a video anthology and drama. The short film aired on MTV Base starring Atandwa Kani, Fikile Kani, Denise Zimba and herself. She released 5 singles from the album, including "Mbongo Zaka" and "Dololo". The visual album won several accolades, including a South African Film and Television Award for Best Micro Budget Film Award, and a South African Music Award for Best Music Video of the Year.

In 2018, Rouge was the presenter for SABC 1 music show Remix SA. She is also one of the deciders of candy company Halls SA's hashtag competition HallsOMFCC. On March 14, 2019, Rouge announced signing with Sony Music South Africa.

== Awards and nominations ==
| Year | Award Ceremony | Category | Nominee/work | Result | Ref. |
|---|---|---|---|---|---|
| 2018 | South African Film and Television Awards | Best Micro Budget Film Award | New Era Sessions | Won | |
| 2018 | South African Music Awards | Best Music Video of the Year | Arumtumtum | Won | |
| 2018 | South African Music Awards | Best Hip Hop Album | The New Era Sessions | Nominated | |
| 2018 | South African Music Awards | Best Newcomer Of The Year | The New Era Sessions | Nominated | |
| 2018 | SABRE Awards Africa | Best Southern Africa PR campaign | New Era Sessions – Rouge | Won | |
| 2018 | SABRE Awards Africa | Best Corporate image | New Era Sessions – Rouge | Won | |
| 2018 | SABRE Awards Africa | Platinium Award | New Era Sessions – Rouge | Nominated | |
| 2018 | All Africa Music Awards | Best Female Southern Africa | Rouge | Nominated | |
| 2018 | All Africa Music Awards | Best African Lyricist/Rapper | Rouge | Nominated | |
| 2018 | All Africa Music Awards | Best African Dance/choreography | Arumtumtum | Nominated | |
| 2017 | South African Hip Hop Awards | Best Female Artist | Rouge | Won | |
| 2017 | South African Hip Hop Awards | Freshman of the year (NewComer) | Rouge | Nominated | |

== Discography ==
- The New Era Sessions (2017)

=== Tracklist ===
| Track | Title | Producers |
|---|---|---|
| 1 | Intro | Wichi 1080 |
| 2 | Underrated | Nizi (Kids Of Crackling) |
| 3 | Celebrity | Mae N. Maejor / K-Beatz |
| 4 | Let It Go | Lionel Soulchildren |
| 5 | Déjà Vu | Ron Epidemic |
| 6 | No Pressure | Ron Epidemic |
| 7 | Dololo feat. Bigstar | Mae N. Maejor / K-Beatz / Add. Ron Epidemic |
| 8 | Arumtumtum | Mae N. Maejor / Wichi 1080 |
| 9 | Naledi | Mae N. Maejor / Wichi 1080 |
| 10 | The Breakup | Wichi 1080 |
| 11 | Simon Says feat. Kly & Shasha | Wichi 1080 |
| 12 | No Strings | Mae N. Maejor |
| 13 | Mbongo-Zaka feat. Moozlie | Tweezy |
| 14 | Sheba Ngwan O | Wichi 1080 |
| 15 | Mabele | Mae N. Maejor / K-Beatz / Add. Wichi 1080 |

Single Release

| Track | Title | Producers |
|---|---|---|
| 1 | Bazigally | Wichi 1080 |
| 2 | Popular (feat. Emtee) | Tweezy |
| 3 | No Cap (Freestyle) | Wichi 1080 |
| 4 | One By One (feat. AKA) | Tweezy |
| 5 | Popular Remix (feat. Costa Titch, Hanna, Blxckie & Tumi Tladi) | N/A |
| 6 | WAG (WhatsApp Group) (feat. Sarkodie & Youssoupha) | N/A |
