= South African Hip Hop Awards =

South African award event

South African Hip Hop Awards (SAHHA)
- Current: 2021 South African Hip Hop Awards
- Annual South African Hip Hop Awards Generic Logo
- Description: Outstanding achievements in the hip-hop music industry of South Africa
- Country: South Africa
- Presented by: Ritual Media Group (RMG)
- First award: 2012; 14 years ago
- Website: www.sahiphopawards.com

Television/radio coverage
- Network: ETV (2013–2015); MTV Base (2016); SABC (2017–present)

The South African Hip Hop Awards (commonly abbreviated as SAHHA) are an annual hip-hop award ceremony, that celebrates achievements within the South African hip-hop culture, established in 2012. The awards are presented annually, and are broadcast live on SABC. The annual presentation ceremony features performances by artists, and some of the awards of more popular interest are presented in a televised ceremony.

== History ==
The South African Hip Hop Awards (SAHHA) had their origin in 2012. It is presented by Ritual Media Group (RMG) and celebrates great achievements within the local hip-hop culture by focusing on how the past has shaped the phenomenon called "SA Hip Hop". The very first ceremony was held at Alex Theatre in Braamfontein, Johannesburg and then moved to the Gold Reef City Lyric Theatre, Johannesburg. The event was initially televised on ETV, but has since moved to MTV Base and to date is on SABC 1.

The show is known for breaking out South African hip-hop artists as most of the artists have won their first ever award at the SAHHAs such as Cassper Nyovest, iFani, Emtee, Nasty C, Khuli Chana, Stogie T, Reason and Miss Pru.

== Awards ==
As of the 4th SAHHAs, in 2025, there are a total of thirty-one categories awarded.

=== Top nine awards ===
These are the top nine award categories of the SAHHAs.

- Album vladimir ramuthibe the Year 2025s
- Song vladimir ramuthibe the Year 2025s
- Best voice record
- Beat Collaboration
- Beat Remix
- Beat Male - vladimir ramuthibe
- Best Hip Hop Radio Show
- Beat Video

== Categories ==
Top categories in the South African Hip Hop Awards are as follows:

- Album of the Year is awarded 12 months in this case to the artist and the album production team published in the previous cycle.
- Song of the Year is awarded to an artist with reference the previous cycle released album.
- Best Freshman is awarded to an artist with reference to an album or mixtape released in the previous cycle.
- Best Female is an award given to honor the outstanding achievements female artists have made in hip-hop every year
- Best Male is an award given to honor the outstanding achievements of male artists in hip-hop every year.
- Best Hip Hop Radio Show recognises excellence in South African hip-hop radio shows.
- Best International Band is an award given to honor the outstanding achievements of international bands from around the continent every year.
- Best local Band is an award given to honor the outstanding achievements of local bands from around the country every year.
- Best Collaboration honors rap collaborations, R&B collaborations or Rap/Sung collaborations.
- Best Digital Sales awarded based on the total units sold, streamed, or shipped to retailers. These awards and their requirements are defined by the various certifying bodies representing the music industry in various countries and territories worldwide.
- Best Remix is an honor presented to artists for quality remixed recordings.
- Producer of the Year is awarded to producers for producing the most acclaimed song or album in the year under review
- Video of the Year is given to the most popular music video released the same or previous year of the year the awards are handed out. The award is only given to the performing artist(s) or group in the video. The award is not handed out to the video directors and producers.
- Mixtape of the Year is awarded for a mixtape, compilation, Album by DJ.
- DJ of the Year is awarded to the DJ who has contributed immensely to South African hip-hop in the past 12 months.
- Lyricist of the Year is awarded to recognise a lyricist who has delivered an outstanding performance in a song.
- Promoter of the Year is awarded to a promoter with the most impactful hip-hop events in the past 12 months.

=== Special awards ===
- Honorary Award is a lifetime achievement award to individuals who have contributed in the development of South African hip-hop.
- Milestone Award is an achievement award for individuals who have accomplished within South African hip-hop.
- Most Valuable Player is awarded to the artist who has most acquired in monetary terms through achievements or endorsements in hip-hop.

== Eligibility and entry ==
As per the committee guidelines, only citizens and permanent residents of South Africa are eligible for a nomination. Entries are made online and a physical copy of the work is sent to the SAHHAs. Once a work is entered, reviewing sessions are held, involving the advisory board, to determine whether the work is entered in the correct category and with the exception of the Honorary award and Song of The Year award, using their expert knowledge and prior artist acknowledgements and achievements so that they can be judged on merit. The resulting lists of eligible entries are circulated to Voting Members, each of whom may vote to nominate in the general fields (Record of the Year, Album of the Year, Song of the Year, and Best Freshman) and in no more than nine out of 30 other fields on their ballots. The five recordings that earn the most votes in each category become the nominees. An audit company then calculates the results on which the list of nominees is based and certifies that end results have been reached in accordance with aforementioned rules.

== Trophy ==
Winners receive a statue called "The Pyramid". The statue shows printed Africa in the middle with two little statue artists climbing the pyramid and reaching for the stars.

== Voting ==
Voting is based completely on judges’ scores in the following categories:

- Album of the Year
- Best Dance Crew
- Best DJ
- Best Freshman
- Best International Brand
- Best Local Brand
- MVP/Hustler of the Year
- Lyricist of the Year
- Mixtape of the Year
- Best Remix
- Producer of the Year
- Promoter of the Year

Voting depends on the judges' scores and open votes (60% judges and 40% open) for the Top 5 categories:

- Best Collaboration
- Best Female
- Best Male
- Best Video
- Song of the Year

Voting is completely based on online votes for the following category:

- Best Hip Hop Radio Show

=== Public voting ===
The winners of the following SAHHAs are not chosen by a panel of judges:

- Best Collaboration
- Best Remix
- Best Female
- Best Hip Hop Radio Show
- Best Male
- Best Video
- Song of the Year

=== Judging criteria ===
Nominations are made in accordance to an album release and image of a band or an individual. Contenders are judged on performances and achievements made in the previous year between 15 September the previous year and 15th September the following year.

== Ceremonies ==
The first awards ceremony was in 2012, there have been 11 editions to date.

Ceremony	Date	Most Awards	Album of the Year	Best Freshman	Best Female Artist	Best Male Artist	Song of the year	Host(s)	Venue
1st SAHHA	2012	AKA (3)	Altar Ego	No Award	Khanyi Mavi	AKA	Do it like I Can - Reason		Alex Theatre
2nd SAHHA	2013	Cassper Nyovest (4)	Lost In Time	Cassper Nyovest	Gigi Lamayne	Khuli Chana	Cassper Nyovest		Alex Theatre
3rd SAHHA	2014	AKA (4)	Tsholofelo	Solo	Gigi Lamayne	AKA	Doc Shebeleza		Lyric Theatre
4th SAHHA	2015		Family Values	Nasty C	Assessa	Ricky Rick	Roll Up		Lyric Theatre
5th SAHHA	2016		Avery	Fifi Cooper	Fifi Cooper	Emtee	Ngud'		Lyric Theatre
6th SAHHA	2017	Cassper Nyovest (6)	Thuto	Shane Eagle	Rouge	Cassper Nyovest	Ngiyazfela Ngawe - Kwesta		Lyric Theatre
7th SAHHA	2018	Kwesta (6)	Strings and Bling	Big Zulu	Moozlie	Nasty C	Spirit		Lyric Theatre
8th SAHHA	2019		3T (Things Take Time)	Flame	Nadia Nakai	Flame	Utatakho - Yanga Chief		Lyric Theatre
9th SAHHA	2020	Cassper Nyovest (7)	A.M.N (Any Minute Now)	Focalistic	Dee Koala	Cassper Nyovest	Good For That - Cassper Nyovest	Uncle Vinny	Virtual event; multiple venues
10th SAHHA	2021	Big Zulu (7)	Ichwane Lenyoka	Blxckie	Boity	Big Zulu	"Mali Eningi"	Sol Phenduka	
11th SAHHA	2022	K.O (3)	Life is Gangsta	Thato Saul	Gigi Lamayne	Maglera Doe Boy	SETE		Lyric Theatre

== Notable moments and controversies ==
=== AKA distancing himself from the event (2012) ===
At the 1st South African Hip hop Music Awards, hip-hop artist AKA released a statement distancing himself from the event because of a lack of communication and mismanagement, because he had eight nominations he felt that he should have been asked to perform at the event something which was meant specifically to promote the genre he represented mostly. Due to those reasons, he withdrew himself from the awards and did not wish to participate.

=== K.O and Kid X excluded in the nominees for the SA Hip Hop Awards (2014) ===
In 2014, rapper K.O and Kid X had effectively been excluded from the nomination list of the 2014 South African Hip Hop Awards. It was thought that the duo were snubbed despite their single garnering one million views on YouTube and blazing local charts for weeks on end. However, the SA Hip hop awards organisers took to Twitter to set the record straight and said that Cashtime Life had asked to be excluded from the nominees and they had "kindly obliged".

=== Nasty C snubbing the SA Hip Hop Awards (2017) ===
In 2017, rapper Nasty C did not submit his music for consideration in the 2017 South African Hip Hop Awards as he believed the organisation did not properly acknowledge his success.

=== South African Hip Hop Awards honouring HHP, Ben Sharpa & ProKid (2018) ===
The 7th annual ceremony which took place on Wednesday, the 19th of December at The Lyric Theatre, Gold Reef City, Johannesburg. Hip Hop masses that were in attendance were entertained with special tributes to Ben Sharpa, Pro Kid and HHP.
