= Riky Rick =

South African rapper (1987–2022)

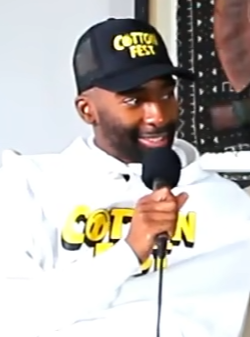
- Makhado in 2020
- Born: Rikhado Makhado; 20 July 1987; KwaMashu, KwaZulu-Natal, South Africa
- Died: 23 February 2022 (aged 34); Johannesburg, Gauteng, South Africa
- Other names: King Kotini; Boss Zonke
- Education: Hilton College
- Occupations: Rapper; singer; songwriter; actor; record producer; entrepreneur; television personality; media personality; Actor
- Spouse: Bianca Naidoo (m. 2013–2022)
- Children: 2
- Musical career
- Genres: Hip hop; kwaito; trap
- Instrument: Vocals
- Labels: Cotton Club Records; Makhado Makhado Agency; Sony Music
- Website: rikyrickworld.com

Rikhado Makhado (20 July 1987 – 23 February 2022), known professionally as Riky Rick, was a South African rapper, singer, songwriter, record producer and entrepreneur. He was also the founder and owner of record label Cotton Club Records and a member of Boyz N Bucks and he's well known for his hit song Boss Zonke from his album Family Values.

He came into the limelight between 2009 and 2010, when he dropped mixtapes such as The Comeback Kid and Last Summer with Da L.E.S.

== Life and career ==
=== 1987–2014: Early life and early career ===
Rikhado Muziwendlovu Makhado was born on 20 July 1987. He was raised in KwaMashu township near Durban, Natal. His childhood friends described him as a creative individual who was entrepreneurial, kind and artistically gifted, even at a young age.

Makhado's music career actually began at a recording studio session with Bongani Fassie, son of the "African queen of Afropop" Brenda Fassie. It was by Fassie's side that Makhado was inspired to make his own music. That is when he released his first single "Barbershop" featuring Da L.E.S.

=== 2015–2022: Family Values, Scooby Snacks EP ===
His single Fok Julle Naaiers (Nafukwa) which was released in 2014, won an MTV Africa Music Award for Video of the Year.

On 3 April 2015, his debut studio album Family Values was released and received positive reviews from music critics. It featured guest appearances from Cassper Nyovest, Okmalumkoolkat, Zano and Black Motion. The album was certified platinum by the Recording Industry of South Africa (RiSA) with sales of over 50 000 units. Its success saw him nominated for eight South African Hip-Hop Awards (SAHHAs) that year, more than any other artist. Family Values remains his only studio album to date. It was released and made available for purchase on iTunes by Makhado Makhado Agency on 3 April 2015.

On 24 April 2014, his single "Sondela", featuring Zano, was released, which was dedicated to his beloved wife Bianca. On 28 October 2014, the smash hit Boss Zonke was released, which peaked at number 3 on the SA Hip Hop Top Ten List.

One of the most popular tracks on the tracklist "Amantombazane" led to the "Amantombazane Remix" which featured fellow South African recording artists OkMalumKoolKat, Maggz, Kwesta, Ginger Breadman, Kid X, Nadia Nakai and DJ Dimplez. The track was nominated for Remix of the Year at the 2015 South African Music Awards (SAMAs).

In June 2016, his single "Sidlukotini" was released. "Sidlukotini" directly translates to "We are eating cotton" in Zulu. This song spoke to Makhado's love for fashion. For Sidlukotini, he won Best Hit Single at the 2016 Metro FM Music Awards, an award ceremony that infamously saw him take to the stage and criticise the awards for being rigged before encouraging upcoming musicians to forget the radio and make their songs "pop on the internet".

He left independent record label Mabala Noise shortly after the awards. He then released the Scooby Snacks EP that features only one artist, Frank Casino. It includes the tracks "Oh Lord", "Bandz Over Fans" and "Family" (featuring Frank Casino). He followed up his growing body of work when he released "Buy It Out" on 15 September 2017. Just a year later, he released a new EP, Stay Shining, through a licensing deal between his new label Cotton Club Records and Sony Music Entertainment Africa.

In November 2018, he announced his first concert called "Cotton Fest", which he personally headlined on 2 February 2019. In an interview in 2019, Riky described the festival as being "... for us, by us, for the people, for everybody. It's not about me. It's not a one-man show."

== Personal life ==
In early 2010, Makhado met his wife Bianca Naidoo in Sandton. She had a daughter from a previous relationship. After close to three years of dating, the couple got married in 2013. About a year later, they welcomed their first child together, a son.

In 2020, in an interview with rapper Yanga Chief on his Lab Live YouTube series, Makhado opened up about his suicidal past. After battling alcohol and drug addiction in his youth, he practiced sobriety after going through a difficult time.

== Death ==
Makhado died of suicide on 23rd February 2022 in Johannesburg, aged 34.

In October 2025, the Riky Rick Foundation partnered with Sandton City to launch a mental health awareness initiative titled "Words That Heal." This campaign is part of the Foundation's ongoing mission to champion mental wellness and emotional support.

== Discography ==
=== Studio albums ===
List of studio albums, with selected information
Title	Album details	Certification
Family Values	Released: 3 April 2015; Label: Makhado Makhado Agency; Formats: CD, digital download	RISA: Platinum
Boss Zonke Forever	Released: 04 April 2025; Label: Sony Music Entertainment Africa|Anolabex (PTY) LTD|Cotton Club Records; Formats: CD,digital download	TBA

=== EPs ===
List of extended plays, with selected information
Title	Album details	Certification
Scooby Snacks EP	Released: 25 May 2017; Label: Cotton Club Records; Formats: CD, digital download	
Stay Shining EP	Released: 3 November 2017; Label: Cotton Club Records; Formats: CD, digital download	
Ungazincishi	Released: 2020; Label: Cotton Club Records; Formats: digital download	

=== Mixtapes ===
- Comeback Kid (2011)

== Awards and nominations ==
Year	Awards	Category	Results	Ref.
2020	KZN Entertainment Awards	Best Male Award	Nominated	
2021	South African Hip Hop Awards	Best Collaboration	Won	
2021	South African Hip Hop Awards	Artist of the Decade	Nominated	
2021	South African Hip Hop Awards	MVP/Hustler of the Year	Won	
