= Amanda Black discography =

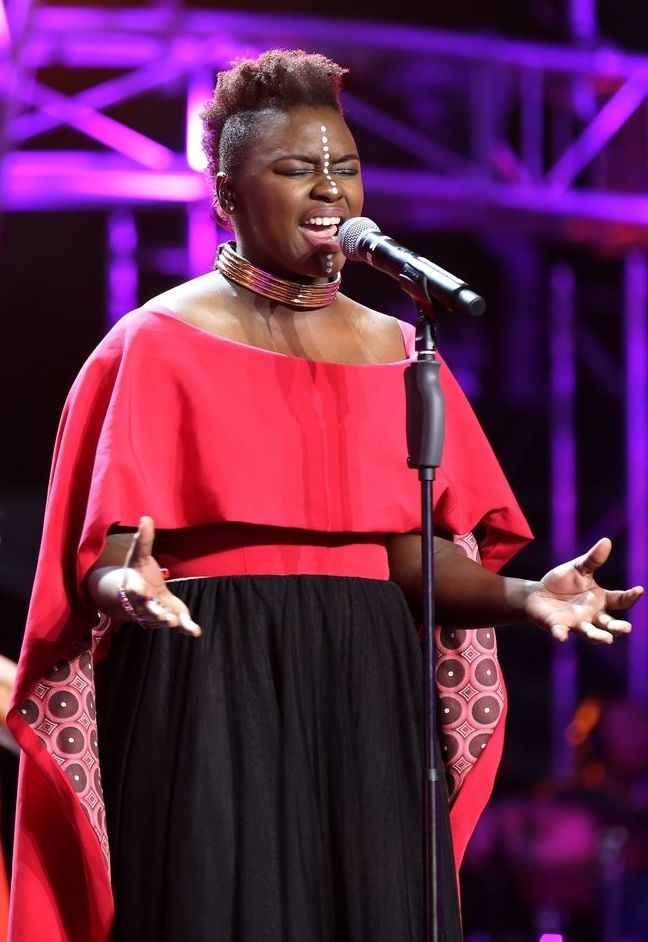
- Studio albums: 4
- Singles: 5
- Music videos: 4

South African singer Amanda Black has released four studio albums, eleven singles (including six as a featured artist) and seven music videos (including three as a featured artist). She achieved recognition in 2016 following the release of her hit single "Amazulu", which was nominated for several music awards. Her debut studio album Amazulu was certified platinum three weeks after its official release. Black's music has been released through record labels Ambitiouz Entertainment, Sony Music, and her own label AfroRockstar.

== Albums ==
=== Studio albums ===
List of studio albums, with selected information
Title	Album details	Peak chart positions	Certification
Title	Album details	ZA	Certification
Amazulu	Released: 11 November 2016; Label: Ambitiouz Entertainment; Formats: CD, Digital download	1	RISA: 3× Platinum
Power	Released: 25 October 2019; Label: Sony Music Entertainment; Formats: CD, Digital download	1	
Mnyama	Released: 6 August 2021; Label: Sony Music Entertainment; Formats: CD, Digital download		
From My Soil To Yours	Released: 17 November 2023; Label: Sony Music Entertainment; Formats: Digital download, Streaming	—	
"—" denotes a recording that did not chart or was not released in that territory.

== Singles ==
=== As lead artist ===
List of singles as lead artist, with selected chart positions and certifications, showing year released and album name
Title	Year	Peak chart positions			Certifications	Album
Title	Year	ZA	UK	US	Certifications	Album
"Amazulu"	2016	1	—	—	RISA: 3× Platinum	Amazulu
"Separate"	2016	8	—	—	RISA: Platinum	Amazulu
"Kahle"	2016	15	—	—		Amazulu
"Thandwa Ndim"	2019	13	—	—		Power
"Egoli"	2019	15	—	—		Power
"Kutheni Nah" (featuring Kwesta)	2019					Mnyama
"Let It Go"	2019					Mnyama
"Mahala"	2023					Non-album single
"—" denotes a recording that did not chart or was not released in that territory.

=== As featured artist ===
Title	Year	Peak chart positions			Certifications	Album
Title	Year	ZA	UK	US	Certifications	Album
"Sebenza" (A-Reece featuring Amanda Black)	2016	—	—	—		Paradise
"Phumelela" (Miss Pru featuring Amanda Black, Saudi, Sjava, LaSauce, A-Reece, Fifi Cooper and Emtee)	2016	15	—	—	RISA: Platinum	Non-album single
"I Do" (LaSauce featuring Amanda Black)	2017	1	—	—	RISA: 2× Platinum	Broken Lipstick
"Round & Round" (Joey B featuring Amanda Black)	2017	39	—	—		Non-album single
"Gaz' Lam" (Vusi Nova featuring Amanda Black)	2018	20	—	—		Non-album single
"Promised Land" (Yanga featuring Amanda Black)	2019	—	—	—		Promised Land
"Siyathandana" (Berita featuring Amanda Black)	2020	—	—	—		Songs in the Key of Love

== Guest appearances ==
List of non-single guest appearances, with other performing artists, showing year released and album name
Title	Year	Other artist(s)	Album
"My Baby"	2016	Jaziel Brothers	Out of the Box
"Why"	2016	Jaziel Brothers	Out of the Box
"Family"	2016	A-Reece & P-Jay	Paradise

== Music videos ==
=== As lead artist ===
List of music videos as lead artist, showing year released and directors
Title	Year	Director(s)
"Amazulu"	2016	Ambitiouz Visuals / RB Films
"Kahioile"	2016	Ambitiouz Visuals
"Thandwa Ndim"	2019	Vanishia Kirsten
"Egoli"	2019	Kuda Jembe
"Ndizele Wena"	2020	Kuda Jembe

=== As featured artist ===
List of music videos as featured artist, showing year released and directors
Title	Year	Director(s)
"Seb enza" (A-Reece featuring Amanda Black)	2016	Ambitiouz Visuals / RB Films
"Phumelela" (Miss Pru featuring Amanda Black, Saudi, Sjava, LaSauce, A-Reece, Fifi Cooper and Emtee)	2016	Ambitiouz Visuals
"I Do" (LaSauce featuring Amanda Black)	2017	Ambitiouz Visuals
"Promised Land" (Yanga featuring Amanda Black)	2018	Pilot Films
