= List of awards and nominations received by Zonke =

Zonke awards and nominations
Awards and nominations
Award	Wins	Nominations
Channel O Music Video Awards	1	1
Metro FM Music Awards	1	9
MTV Africa Music Awards	0	1
South African Music Awards	6	17

Totals (Note: Certain award groups do not simply award one winner. They acknowledge several different recipients, have runners-up, and have third place. Since this is a specific recognition and is different from losing an award, runner-up mentions are considered wins in this award tally. For simplification and to avoid errors, each award in this list has been presumed to have had a prior nomination.)
- Wins: 8
- Nominations: 28

South African singer-songwriter and record producer Zonke has won eight awards from twenty-eight nominations. She won her first major award in 2008 at the 14th South African Music Awards after her song "Ekhaya" won "Best Record of the Year".

== Channel O Africa Music Video Awards ==
First held in 2003 as Reel Music Video Awards, the Channel O Africa Music Video Awards are Pan-African music awards organised by South Africa-based television channel Channel O. Zonke has won the award once.

Year	Nominee / work	Award	Result	Ref.
2013	"Feelings"	Most Gifted Female Video of the Year	Won	

== Metro FM Music Awards ==
Metro FM Music Awards is an annual awards ceremony that was established in 2000 by Metro FM with the aim of offering its listeners to honour their favorite South African artists. Zonke has won one award out of nine nominations.

Year	Nominee / work	Award	Result	Ref.
2007	"Ekhaya"	Song of the Year	Nominated	
2007	Herself	Best Newcomer	Nominated	
2011	"Thinking About You" with Theo	Best Collaboration of the Year	Nominated	
2013	Ina Ethe	Best Female Album	Won	
2013	Ina Ethe	Best Produced Album	Nominated	
2013	"Feelings"	Song of the Year	Nominated	
2016	"Reach It"	Best R&B Single	Nominated	
2016	Work of Heart	Best African Pop Album	Nominated	
2016	Work of Heart	Best Female Album	Nominated	

== MTV Africa Music Awards ==
The MTV Africa Music Awards were established in 2008 by MTV Networks Africa to celebrate the most popular contemporary music in Africa.

Year	Nominee / work	Award	Result	Ref.
2008	Herself	Best Female Artist	Nominated	

== South African Music Awards ==
The South African Music Awards (also known as The SAMAs) are the Recording Industry of South Africa's music industry awards, established in 1995.

Year	Nominee / work	Award	Result	Ref.
2008	"Ekhaya"	Record of the Year	Won	
2008	Life, Love 'n Music	Album of the Year	Nominated	
2008	Life, Love 'n Music	Best Urban Pop Album	Nominated	
2008	Life, Love 'n Music	Best Female Album	Nominated	
2012	"Thinking About You" (with Theo Kgosinkwe)	Record of the Year	Nominated	
2012	Ina Ethe	Album of the Year	Nominated	
2012	Ina Ethe	Best African Adult Album	Won	
2012	Herself	Female Artist of the Year	Nominated	
2014	Give and Take Live	Best African Adult Album	Won	
2014	Give and Take Live	Best Live DVD	Won	
2016	Herself	Female Artist of the Year	Won	
2016	Work of Heart	Best Engineered Album of the Year	Nominated	
2016	Work of Heart	Best Produced Album of the Year	Nominated	
2016	Work of Heart	Best R&B/Soul/Reggae Album	Nominated	
2019	L.O.V.E	Album of the Year	Nominated	
2019	L.O.V.E	Female Artist of the Year	Nominated	
2019	L.O.V.E	Best R&B/Soul Album	Nominated	
2019	L.O.V.E	Best Produced Album	Won	
