= List of awards and nominations received by Amanda Black =

Amanda Black awards and nominations
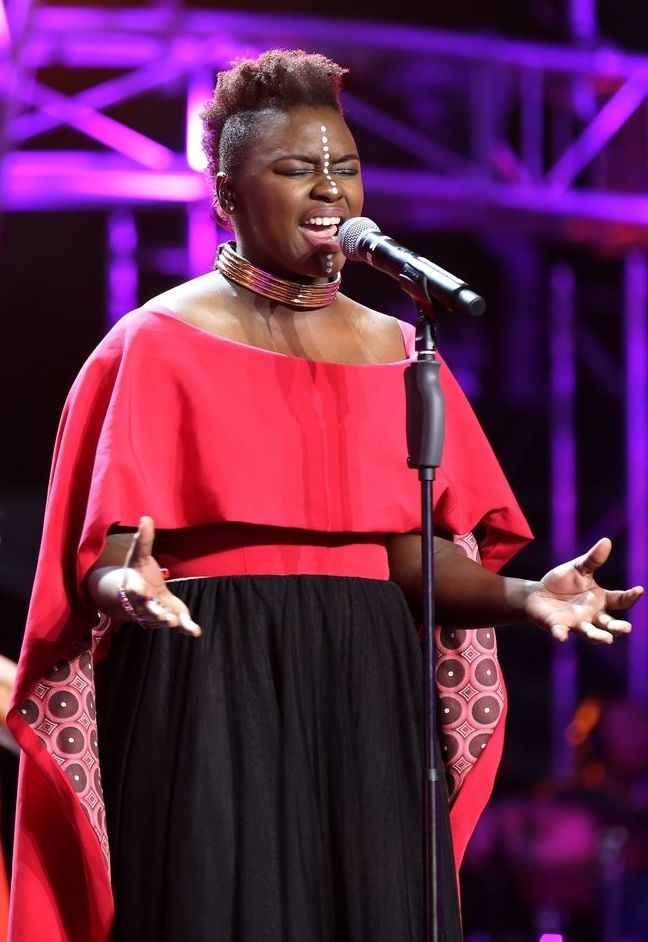
Awards and nominations
Award	Wins	Nominations
Metro FM Music Awards	2	6
South African Music Awards	4	6
BET Awards	0	1
DStv Mzansi Viewers' Choice Awards	0	1
All Africa Music Awards	0	1
Nigeria Entertainment Awards	0	1
Dance Music Awards South Africa	0	1
South African Afro Music Awards	0	2

Totals (Note: Certain award groups do not simply award one winner. They acknowledge several different recipients, have runners-up, and have third place. Since this is a specific recognition and is different from losing an award, runner-up mentions are considered wins in this award tally. For simplification and to avoid errors, each award in this list has been presumed to have had a prior nomination.)
- Wins: 6
- Nominations: 17

The following is a list of accolades received by the South African singer Amanda Black.

== Awards and nominations ==
=== Metro FM Music Awards ===
Year	Nominee / work	Award	Result	Ref
2017	Amazulu	Best African Pop Album	Nominated	
2017	Amazulu	Best Female Album	Nominated	
2017	Herself	Best New Artist	Nominated	
2017	"Amazulu"	Song of the Year	Nominated	
2017	"Separate"	Best R&B Single	Won	
2017	Herself	Listeners Choice Award	Won	

=== South African Music Awards ===
Year	Nominee / work	Award	Result	Ref
2017	Amazulu	Album of the Year	Won	
2017	"Amazulu"	Record of the Year	Nominated	
2017	Herself	Best Newcomer of the Year	Won	
2017	Herself	Best Female Artist of the Year	Won	
2017	Amazulu	Best R&B Soul Reggae Album	Won	

=== BET Awards ===
Year	Nominee / work	Award	Result	Ref
2017	Herself	Viewers Choice: Best International Act	Nominated	

=== DStv Mzansi Viewers' Choice Awards ===
Year	Nominee / work	Award	Result	Ref
2017	Herself	Rising Star	Nominated	

=== AFRIMA ===
Year	Nominee / work	Award	Result	Ref
2017	Herself	Best Female Artist Southern Africa	Nominated	
2017	Herself	Best Female Artiste in Inspirational Music	Nominated	

=== Nigeria Entertainment Awards ===
Year	Nominee / work	Award	Result	Ref
2017	Herself	Best African Female Artist (Non Nigerian)	Nominated	

=== Dance Music Awards South Africa ===
Year	Nominee / work	Award	Result	Ref
2018	Herself	Best African Vocalist of the Year	Nominated	
