= DJ Citi Lyts =

South African DJ and musician (1989–2022)

- Born: Sandile Nkululeko Mkhize; December 8, 1989; Soweto, South Africa
- Died: 14 February 2022 (aged 32); Dube, Soweto, South Africa
- Resting place: Soweto
- Occupations: DJ, Rapper, Producer
- Years active: 2014–2022
- Children: 1

Sandile Nkululeko Mkhize (8 December 1989 – 14 February 2022), popularly known by his stage name DJ Citi Lyts, was a South African hip hop deejay, rapper and producer. He was the younger brother of prominent rapper Pro.

He was known for his hit tracks like "Washa" and "Vura", and had collaborated with several major artists. He was tragically shot and killed in Dube, Soweto on 14 February 2022 in what was believed to be a botched hijacking.

== Early life ==
DJ Citi Lyts was born on 8 December 1989 in Soweto, South Africa. He was the younger brother of Linda Mkhize, who was known in the hip hop circles as Pro.

Citi Lyts discovered his love for music while still in school in Yeoville, central Johannesburg, where he was part of a Pantsula dance group and the school choir.

== Music career ==
DJ Citi Lyts started his career after meeting F-Eezy and soon joined Ambitiouz Entertainment, where he worked alongside artists such as Sjava, Emtee, and Fifi Cooper.

Citi Lyts released the hit song Vura in 2016, which featured Sjava and Saudi. The song was nominated for the South African Music Awards and a Metro FM Award in 2017.

He followed up with Washa, featuring Emtee, Fifi Cooper, and B3nchmark, which cemented his name in the South African music industry. Washa became one of the biggest hip hop songs in South Africa in 2015 and ranked within the top five on South Africa’s Top 100 charts during the New Year’s Eve countdown.

Besides music, DJ Citi Lyts was also a co-owner of a restaurant, Ezio Cafe, located on Vilakazi Street, Soweto.

== Murder ==
In the early hours of 14 February 2022, police were called to a murder scene in Dube at approximately 2:00 am. On arrival, they found a 32-year-old man lying on the ground with gunshot wounds to the upper body.

The rapper was with his friends when they were shot at by suspects driving a silver VW Polo. He was certified dead by paramedics at the scene, having been shot eight times during the attack.
