= P2: The Big Hearted Bad Guy =

2023 studio album by A-Reece

Studio album by A-Reece
- Released: 20 October 2023
- Genre: Hip-hop
- Length: 46:09
- Label: Revenge Club
- Producers: Michael Tuohy; Myrthe Van de Weetering; Benjamin Zolile Gewer; Mélange; Zeke Dalton; SoulKit; Trigganasty; IceMan Beatz; Sundae Beats; Chistopher Corgan; Kennedy Sabin; Lokombe Nathan Wemba; Archi; Lucasg

A-Reece chronology
Deadlines: Free P2 (2022)	P2: The Big Hearted Bad Guy (2023)

Singles from P2: The Big Hearted Bad Guy
- 1. "Bruce Wayne" Released: 20 September 2023; 2. "Ving Rhames" Released: 5 October 2023

P2: The Big Hearted Bad Guy (stylized in all uppercase; also known as Paradise 2) is the third studio album by South African rapper A-Reece released on 20 October 2023 by Revenge Club Records, it is the sequel to his 2016 studio album Paradise. It features guest appearances from Ghanaian rapper M.anifest, South African musicians Sjava, Shekhinah, Jay Jody, Blxckie, and American rappers Joey Fatts and Fly Anakin.

== Background ==
The album of 19 songs was led by two singles, "Bruce Wayne" and "Ving Rhames", the latter released on 5 October 2023 and accompanied by music video released the following day on YouTube. The pre-order link, release date as well as the track list were announced by the rapper on 16 October 2023 on Instagram, and by amapiano DJ and record producer DJ Maphorisa in an Instagram Live.

== Track listing ==
P2: The Big Hearted Bad Guy track listing
No.	Title	Writer(s)	Producer(s)	Length
1.	"Intro"	Phologo Judah Mataboge	Myrthe Van de Weetering	0:49
2.	"The Run"	Lehlogonolo Ronald Mataboge	Benjamin Zolile Gewer	3:35
3.	"West Africa Time" (featuring M.anifest)	Lehlogonolo Ronald Mataboge; Kwame Ametepee Tsikata	Michael Tuohy; Mélange	4:03
4.	"El Dorado" (featuring Fly Anakin)	Lehlogonolo Ronald Mataboge; Frank L Walton Jr.	Michael Tuohy; Zeke Dalton	1:54
5.	"One Time" (featuring Blxckie)	Lehlogonolo Ronald Mataboge; Sihle Sithole	Michael Tuohy	3:04
6.	"Ving Rhames"	Lehlogonolo Ronald Mataboge	Michael Tuohy	1:21
7.	"Changes Interlude"	Lehlogonolo Ronald Mataboge	Michael Tuohy	0:42
8.	"Angelz and Demonz"	Lehlogonolo Ronald Mataboge	SoulKit	2:33
9.	"White Noise" (featuring Jay Jody)	Lehlogonolo Ronald Mataboge; Jody Judah Mataboge	Trigganasty	3:08
10.	"Set in Stone" (featuring Joey Fatts)	Lehlogonolo Ronald Mataboge; Joey Vercher	Michael Tuohy	2:06
11.	"Ronnie's Interlude"	Lehlogonolo Ronald Mataboge	Michael Tuohy	1:30
12.	"God Laughs" (featuring Sjava and Shekhinah)	Lehlogonolo Ronald Mataboge; Jabulani Hadebe; Shekhinah Donnell	IceMan Beatz	3:19
13.	"Bruce Wayne"	Lehlogonolo Ronald Mataboge	Michael Touhy	1:55
14.	"Too Much"	Lehlogonolo Ronald Mataboge	Sundae Beats	3:20
15.	"Champion" (featuring M.anifest)	Lehlogonolo Ronald Mataboge; Kwame Ametepee Tsikata	Michael Tuohy; Chistopher Corgan; Kennedy Sabin; Lokombe Nathan Wemba	4:06
16.	"Better Now Interlude"	Lehlogonolo Ronald Mataboge	Michael Tuohy; Chistopher Corgan; Kennedy Sabin	1:24
17.	"Better Now"	Lehlogonolo Ronald Mataboge	Michael Tuohy; Chistopher Corgan; Kennedy Sabin	2:43
18.	"Want It All"	Lehlogonolo Ronald Mataboge; Gabriel Archibald Horowitz	Michael Tuohy; Chistopher Corgan; Archi; Lucasg	2:39
19.	"Outro"	Lehlogonolo Ronald Mataboge		1:58
Total length:				46:09
