= Pro (South African rapper) =

South African rapper (1981–2018)

PRO
- Also known as: Pro Kid
- Born: Linda Mkhize; 22 June 1981; Soweto, South Africa
- Died: 8 August 2018 (aged 37) Johannesburg, South Africa
- Genres: Hip hop
- Occupation: Rapper
- Instrument: Vocals
- Years active: 1994–2018
- Labels: Gallo Records; TS Records; MFE Records; Ivilik Records
- Spouse: Tshimollo Mwelase 2010-2018

Linda Mkhize (22 June 1981 – 8 August 2018), better known by his stage name PRO and formerly as Pro Kid, was a South African rapper and producer. He was known for rapping in a mixture of South African township Soweto vernacular (tsotsi taal) and English. His music spoke on township realities. Mkhize contributed to the development of Kasi Rap; he is also regarded as one of the pioneers of South African hip-hop. His work created opportunities and influence other artists such as AKA, Micky m, Red Button, Siya Shezi(Deep soweto), F-eezy, Chippa M K.O, Maseven, Touchline, Emtee, Kwesta and his younger brother DJ Citi Lyts and many more Kasi rap emcees.

== Life and career ==
Linda Mkhize was born and raised in Orlando, Soweto. When he was a teenager, he would take part in rap battles and cyphers, to showcase his skills. In 2004, he went on to win an emcee battle competition hosted by Tbo Touch. On the urban youth radio station YFM, his success on this show is what led to his breakthrough record deal. In 2017, he co-hosted the SABC 1 rap battle competition One Mic for two seasons along with Big Zulu. He became famous after the release of his first single "Soweto". The song is an ode to his birthplace Soweto. It was produced by his long-time producer and collaborator, Omen The Chef. A follow-up to that was a song called, "Wozobona" which gained widespread popularity in South Africa and set the path for his début album Heads & Tales in 2005.

== Discography ==
=== Studio albums ===
- Heads & Tales (2005)
- DNA (2006)
- Dankie San (2008)
- Snakes & Ladders (2010)
- Continua (2012)

== Death ==
Mkhize died on 8 August 2018 after a seizure, while visiting a friend in Johannesburg CBD. After the announcement of his death, media stations across the country produced tributes to him.
