= Me and You (Emtee song) =

Single by Emtee featuring Tiwa Savage

from the album Manando
- Released: September 10, 2017
- Recorded: 2016–2017
- Studio: Ambitiouz Studios
- Genre: Hip hop; R&B
- Length: 3:42 (album version)
- Label: Ambitiouz Entertainment
- Songwriters: Mthembeni Ndevu; Tiwatope Savage-Balogun
- Producers: Christer; Ron Epidemic

Emtee singles chronology
"Ghetto Hero" (2017)	"Me and You" (2017)	"Manando" (2017)

"Me and You" is a song by South African rapper Emtee. It is the lead single from his sophomore studio album, Manando.

The song was released under Ambitiouz Entertainment just a week before the release of the album Manando, and received good reviews from critics as it exposed a more musical and mature side or the rapper. The track was produced by multi platinum selling producer Christer and Ron Epidemic and features Nigerian superstar Tiwa Savage.

== Background ==
"Me and You" was initially created for Emtee's former label mates, B3nchMarQ. The song leaked on local blog site, Zkhiphani.com with verses from the rap duo featuring Emtee, but after legal threats from Ambitiouz Entertainment, it was then taken down.

== Awards ==
Me And You has been certified Gold by RISA, and was nominated for the RnB and Soul award at the fifth annual All Africa Music Awards (AFRIMA) held in Ghana on 24 November 2018.

== Music video ==
The music video was released two days after the song was released. Shot and directed by Ambitiouz Visuals, the video boasts of beautiful scenes and a summer feel. The video was shot in Durban, South Africa and Gaborone, which is the capital city of Botswana. The music video has surpassed 1 million views on YouTube.
