= Mpumelelo =

- Gender: Male
- Language: Nguni

Other gender
- Feminine: Nompumelelo

Origin
- Meaning: Success

Other names
- Nickname: Mpumi

Mpumelelo is a South African masculine given name. It may refer to:

- Pommie Mbangwa (born Mpumelelo Mbangwa, 1976), Zimbabwean cricket commentator and former cricketer
- Mpumelelo Mhlongo (born 1994), South African sprint and long jump athlete
- Mpumelelo Saziwa, South African politician and trade unionist
- Mpumelelo Xulu (born 1999), South African cricketer
- Mpumelelo Zulu, South African politician
