= Cici (singer) =

South African singer-songwriter and actress

CiCi
- Born: Busisiwe Thwala; 15 February 1987 (age 39); Ladysmith, KwaZulu-Natal, South Africa
- Occupation: Singer-songwriter
- Years active: 2015–present
- Television: Rhythm City (2016)
- Awards: Metro FM Music Awards (Best R&B single. 2016)
- Musical career
- Also known as: CiCi
- Genres: R&B; Afro pop
- Instruments: Vocals
- Labels: Ambitiouz Entertainment; 999 Music (formerly)
- Website: instagram.com/cici

Busisiwe Thwala (born 15 February 1987), is a South African singer-songwriter and actress prominently known under the alias of Cici (often stylized CiCi) who gained recognition in late 2015 subsequent to the release of her single "Runaway".

The "Runaway" single won her two awards in 2016 at the 15th Metro FM Music Awards. In 2017 she left her ex-partner's and manager's (Arthur Mafokate) record label 999 and went on to sign a recording deal with Ambitiouz Entertainment.

She created two albums titled Busisiwe (2017) and Sukulila (2021) under the latter label.

Cici made collaboration with DJ Zinhle, "Thula" released on July 7, 2023. It debuted number 3 and charted number 1 on Metro FM Top 30 Countdown Charts.

== Feuds ==
After signing a recording contract with 999 music in 2016, In 2017 Cici opened a domestic violence case against her former boss and ex-lover Arthur Mafokate, Mafokate retaliated by opening a counter-charge for assault.

== Discography ==
- Busisiwe (2021)
- Sukulila (2017)

=== As lead artist ===
List of singles as lead artist, with selected chart positions and certifications, showing year released and album name
Title	Year	Peak chart positions	Certifications	Album
Title	Year	ZA	Certifications	Album
"Hamba" (Lady Amar, JL SA, Cici, Murumba Pitch)	2023	1	RiSA: Platinum	Non-album single
Thula (DJ Zinhle, Cici)	2023	—		Non-album single
"Mjolo" (Cici JL SA)	2024	—		Non-album single
"Xola" (Msongi, Cici, Sir Trill, featuring Dot Mega)	2024	—		Non-album single
"Impumelelo" (Cici, Liema Pantsi)	2024	—		Non-album single
"Ibhanoyi" (Tee Jay, Cici featuring Seemah & Exclusive Drumz)	2024	—		Non-album single
"—" denotes a recording that did not chart or was not released in that territory.

== Filmography ==
=== Television ===
Year	Title	Role	Notes	Ref.
2016	Rhythm City	Lihle	Recurring role	

== Awards and nominations ==
Year	Award ceremony	Category	Recipient/Nominated work	Results	Ref.
2022	28th SAMAs	Best Afro Pop Album	Sukulila	Nominated	
2018	24th SAMAs	Best R&B/Soul/Reggae Album	Busisiwe	Nominated	
2016	15th Metro FM Music Awards	Best R&B Single	"Runaway"	Won	
2016	15th Metro FM Music Awards	Best Styled Video	"Runaway"	Won	
2016	15th Metro FM Music Awards	Best Compilation Feature		Won	
2023	Basadi in Music Awards	Song of the Year	"Hamba Juba" - Lady Amar, Cici, JL & Murumba Pitch	Nominated	
