= Roll Up (Emtee song) =

Single by Emtee

from the album Avery
- Released: April 22, 2015
- Recorded: 2014
- Genre: Hip hop; trap
- Length: 4:19
- Label: Ambitiouz Entertainment
- Songwriter: Mthembeni Ndevu
- Producer: Ruff

Emtee singles chronology
| "Roll Up" (2015) | "Washa" (2015) |

"Roll Up" is a song by South African rapper Emtee from his debut studio album, Avery. The song was voted "Song of The Year" at the 2015 South African Hip Hop Awards.

== Critical reception ==
Upon its release, "Roll Up" was met with positive reviews among music critics. With massive airplay, it peaked at #1 on YFM's DJ Speedsta's hip hop charts and also peaked at #2 on the local iTunes hip hop/rap chart.

Roll Up has been downloaded over 500,000 times and RiSA has certified it 3× Platinum

== "Roll Up (Re-Up)" ==
On November 28, 2015, a remix for "Roll Up" titled "Roll Up (Re-Up)" was released. It featured vocal appearances from Wizkid and AKA. The video for "Roll Up (Re-Up)" was shot by Ofentse Mwase Films and RB Films in South Africa and was released on YouTube on December 8, 2015.

== Accolades ==
| Year | Award ceremony | Prize | Result |
|---|---|---|---|
| 2015 | South African Hip Hop Awards 2015 | Song of The Year | Won |
| 2016 | 15th Metro FM Music Awards | Best Music Video | Won |
| 2016 | 15th Metro FM Music Awards | Best Remix | Won |
| 2016 | 22nd South African Music Awards | Amstel Record of the Year | Won |
