= Today's Tragedy, Tomorrow's Memory: The Mixtape =

Mixtape by A-Reece
- Released: March 26, 2021
- Recorded: 2020
- Studio: Tea Time Studios, South Africa
- Genre: Hip hop
- Length: 44:00
- Producer: A-Reece; MashBeatz; IMP THA DON; Jimmy Dludlu; Logical Rhymez

A-Reece chronology
Reece Effect (2019)	Today's Tragedy, Tomorrow's Memory: The Mixtape (2021)	Heaven Can Wait: The Narrow Door Vol. 1 (2021)

Singles from Today's Tragedy, Tomorrow's Memory
- 1. "Re$idual Self-Image" Released: August 15, 2020; 2. "The 5 Year Plan" Released: January 22, 2021; 3. "Morning Peace" Released: February 26, 2021

Today's Tragedy, Tomorrow's Memory: The Mixtape is the second official mixtape from South African rapper A-Reece. It was released on March 26, 2021. This mixtape features guest appearances Ayanda Jiya, Stogie T, Wordz, Jay Jody and Belo Salo.

== Background ==
On February 2, 2020, Reece performed unreleased songs, including "The 5 Year Plan", during his show at Riky Rick's Cotton Fest music festival. Reece told Flaunt magazine that he was inspired by Kanye West.

== Awards and nominations ==
List of awards and nominations received by Today's Tragedy, Tomorrow's Memory: The Mixtape
Year	Award	Category	Result	Ref.
2021	South African Hip Hop Awards	Mixtape of the year	Won	
2022	South African Music Awards	Best Hip Hop Album	Nominated	

== Track listing ==
No.	Title	Writer(s)	Producers(s)	Length
1.	"Mark 15:35"	Lehlogonolo Mataboge	Mashbeatz	2:18
2.	"Hibachi"	L. Mataboge	Mashbeatz	2:18
3.	"The 5 Year Plan" (featuring Wordz)	L. Mataboge; Wordz	A-Reece; Mashbeatz; Logical Rhymez	3:21
4.	"The Same Thing" (featuring Jay Jody)	L. Mataboge; P.J. Mataboge	Mashbeatz	4:42
5.	"Nightmare on Bryanston Dr (Freestyle)" (featuring Belo Salo)	L. Mataboge; Belo Salo	Mashbeatz; Logical Rhymez	4:17
6.	"Dichotomy"	L. Mataboge	A-Reece	1:41
7.	"No Man's Land" (featuring Wordz)	L. Mataboge; Wordz	IMP THA DON	4:04
8.	"Jimmy's Interlude" (featuring Ayanda Jiya)	L. Mataboge; Ayanda Jiya; Jimmy Dludlu	Mashbeatz; Dludlu	4:19
9.	"Re$idual Self-Image" (featuring Ayanda Jiya)	L. Mataboge; Jiya	Mashbeatz	4:20
10.	"Morning Peace" (featuring Jay Jody)	L. Mataboge; P.J. Mataboge	Mashbeatz	3:59
11.	"Bravo" (featuring Stogie T and Belo Salo)	L. Mataboge; Stogie T; Salo	Mashbeatz	3:49
12.	"Over Me"	L. Mataboge	A-Reece	2:38
13.	"Dotted Linez"	L. Mataboge	Mashbeatz	2:20
Total length:				44:00

- Note: All songs are stylized in all caps, and with the symbol "$" replacing the letter "S" in the title. For example, "The Same Thing" is stylized as "THE $AME THING"
