= Separate (song) =

Single by Amanda Black

from the album Amazulu
- Released: November 7, 2016
- Recorded: 2016
- Genre: Ballad; R&B
- Length: 3:15
- Label: Ambitiouz
- Songwriter(s): Jabulani Hadebe
- Producer(s): Christer; Sammy

Amanda Black singles chronology
| "Amazulu" (2016) | "Separate" (2016) | "Lila" (2016) |

"Separate" is a song by South African singer Amanda Black, released as the second single from her debut studio album Amazulu. It was sent to radio stations across South Africa in late 2016. Upon its release, the song topped charts on Metro FM. It peaked at number 1 on the South African iTunes R&B Chart. "Separate" was written by Ambitiouz Entertainment label mate, Sjava and produced by Christer, who also acts as Amanda Black's music director.

== Composition ==
"Separate" is a slow piano ballad with an orchestral feel. The song was originally recorded by Sjava and featured a rap verse by label mate Saudi. It is a very emotional heart break song written from a female point of view.

== Accolades ==
The song "Separate" won Best R&B Single at the 15th Metro FM Music Awards.

| Year | Awards ceremony | Award description(s) | Results | Ref |
|---|---|---|---|---|
| 2017 | Metro FM Music Awards | Best R&B Single | Won | |
