= Reach It =

Single by Zonke

from the album Work of Heart
- Released: August 20, 2015
- Genre: afrosoul
- Length: 3:34
- Label: TMP; SME
- Songwriter(s): Zonke Dikana

Zonke singles chronology
"Jik'Izinto" (2015)	"Reach It" (2015)	"Meet Me in My Dreams" (2015)

"Reach It" is a song by South African singer and record producer Zonke. It was released as one of the lead singles from her 2015 studio album Work of Heart.

== Live performances ==
During the 2016 Africa Magic Viewers Choice Awards, Zonke performed a live rendition of "Reach It" along with another single titled "S.O.S (Release Me)".

== Release history ==
List of release dates, showing region, formats, label, editions and reference
Region	Date	Format(s)	Label	Edition(s)	Ref.
Worldwide	20 August 2015	digital download	TMP; Sony	Standard	

== Accolades ==
Year	Award ceremony	Prize	Result	Ref
2016	15th Metro FM Music Awards	Best R&B Single	Nominated	
