= Nompumelelo =

- Gender: Female
- Language: Nguni

Other gender
- Masculine: Mpumelelo

Origin
- Meaning: Success

Nompumelelo is a feminine Nguni name meaning "success". Notable people with the name include:

- Nompumelelo Mhlongo (born 1961), South African politician
- Nompumelelo Mqwebu (born 1977), South African chef and author
- Nompumelelo Ngoma (born 1984), South African visual artist
- Nompumelelo Ntuli Zuma, former South African first lady
- Nompumelelo Maduna (born 1995), South Africa beauty pageant titleholder

== Places ==
- Nompumelelo township of Hanover, Northern Cape
- Nompumelelo township of Buffalo City Metropolitan Municipality
