= Amazulu (song) =

Single by Amanda Black

from the album Amazulu
- Released: July 1, 2016
- Recorded: 2016
- Genre: R&B; Afro-soul; World music
- Length: 4:14
- Label: Ambitiouz Entertainment
- Songwriter(s): Amanda Antony; Christer Kobedi
- Producer(s): Lunatik; Christer; Vuyo Manyike

Amanda Black singles chronology
"Amazulu" (2016)	"Separate" (2016)

"Amazulu" is the debut single by South African singer Amanda Black, released on 1 July 2016. The song is credited to have been instrumental in the upward trajectory of her career following its massive reception which saw it gain rotational nationwide airplay and downloaded over 53,000 times.

== Composition ==
When asked about what the song is about, Amanda Black had this to say: "Amazulu is a journey song in a nutshell. It is a relationship between me and my music and where I want it be, from the disappointment of Idols to being told I wasn't good enough. When I came to Joburg, the only person I knew was my cousin and it was hard as I felt like I wasn't good enough, I had so many doors closed in my face."

The song was written by herself alongside Christer Kobedi and produced by Lunatik with additional production from Christer and Vuyo Manyike.

== Accolades ==
"Amazulu" was nominated for Record of the Year at the 23rd South African Music Awards and Song of the Year at Metro FM Awards.

Year	Awards ceremony	Award description(s)	Results	Ref
2017	Metro FM Music Awards	Song of the Year	Nominated	
2017	South African Music Awards	Record of the Year	Nominated	
