= Paradise (A-Reece album) =

Studio album by A-Reece
- Released: 21 October 2016
- Recorded: 2015–16
- Genre: Hip hop
- Length: 72:25
- Label: Ambitiouz Entertainment
- Producer: Tweezy; MashBeatz; Christer; WiziBeatz; Ruff; RonEpidemic; Troubiga; XLR

A-Reece chronology
Cutaways EP (2016)	Paradise (2016)	From Me to You And Only You (2017)

Singles from Paradise
- 1. "Couldn't" Released: 18 December 2015; 2. "Mgani" Released: 3 June 2016; 3. "Zimbali" Released: 13 September 2016; 4. "Sebenza" Released: 23 September 2016; 5. "Paradise" Released: 2 December 2016

Paradise is the debut studio album by South African hip-hop artist A-Reece. It was released by Ambitiouz Entertainment on 21 October 2016. It features guest appearances from Emtee, P-Jay (member of hip hop duo B3nchMarQ and A-Reece's older brother) and Amanda Black. Paradise topped the iTunes chart under 24 hours of release.

== Singles ==
The album's first single, "Couldn't" which features rapper Emtee, was released on 18 December 2015. The second single, "Mgani" (correctly spelt as "Mngani") which means friend in the Zulu language was released on 3 June 2016. The album's third single "Zimbali" was released on 13 September 2016. The fourth single "Sebenza", meaning "Work" in Zulu was released on 23 September 2016 accompanied by its music video, it features singer Amanda Black.

== Content removal ==
After departing from Ambitiouz Entertainment, the former label removed all of A-Reece's music videos from their YouTube channel. Millions of views were removed.

== Track listing ==
Credits were adapted from the album's liner notes,

Paradise
No.	Title	Writer(s)	Producer(s)	Length
1.	"Paradise"	Lehlogonolo Ronald Mataboge; Amanda Benedicta Antony; Tumelo Thandokuhle Mathebula	Tweezy	4:49
2.	"Kena"	Lehlogonolo Mataboge; Nhlawulo Shipambuli Mashimbyi	MashBeatz	3:40
3.	"Make Up Your Mind"	Lehlogonolo Mataboge; Nhlawulo Shipambuli Mashimbyi	MashBeatz	4:02
4.	"Couldn't" (featuring Emtee)	Lehlogonolo Mataboge; Mthembeni Ndevu	WiziBeatz	4:19
5.	"Uber"	Lehlogonolo Mataboge; Phologo Judah Solomon Mataboge; Tebelelo Kgele Mathiba	XLR	3:32
6.	"This Is My Bitch"	Lehlogonolo Mataboge; Nhlawulo Shipambuli Mashimbyi	MashBeatz	3:47
7.	"Hamba Nami"	Lehlogonolo Mataboge; Mfanafuthi Nkosi	Ruff	3:50
8.	"Ama Hater"	Lehlogonolo Mataboge; Jabulani Makhubo; Tumelo Thandokuhle Mathebula	Tweezy	4:11
9.	"Run Around Jozi"	Lehlogonolo Mataboge; Lesego Kyle Mnyandu	Flame	3:41
10.	"Mgani"	Lehlogonolo Mataboge; Ronald Baloyi	Ron Epidemic	4:06
11.	"What U in 4"	Lehlogonolo Mataboge; Mnqobi Nxumalo	Lunatik	6:01
12.	"Family" (featuring P-Jay and Amanda Black)	Lehlogonolo Mataboge; Amanda Benedicta Antony; Phologo Mataboge; Mfanafuthi Nkosi	Ruff	5:21
13.	"Sebenza" (featuring Amanda Black)	Lehlogonolo Mataboge; Amanda Antony; Nhlawulo Shipambuli Mashimbyi	MashBeatz	3:35
14.	"Zimbali"	Lehlogonolo Mataboge; Nhlawulo Shipambuli Mashimbyi	MashBeatz	4:39
15.	"Boom"	Lehlogonolo Mataboge; Nhlawulo Shipambuli Mashimbyi	MashBeatz	4:05
16.	"Not Anymore"	Lehlogonolo Mataboge; Christer Kobedi; Ronald Baloyi	Christer; Ron Epidemic	3:41
17.	"Let Em' Know"	Lehlogonolo Mataboge; Christer Kobedi	Christer	3:47
18.	"You Welcome (Outro)"	Lehlogonolo Mataboge; Lesego Kyle Mnyandu	Flame	3:13
Total length:				72:25

Notes
- "Paradise", "Zimbali" and "Let Em' Know" contain uncredited vocals from Amanda Black

- "Ama Hater" contains uncredited vocals from Sjava

- "Boom" contains additional vocals from P-Jay

== Personnel ==
Credits for Paradise are adapted from AllMusic.

- Amanda Benedicta Anthony - Composer
- Amanda Black - Featured Artist, Primary Artist
- Bontle Mosetlha - Composer
- Christer Kobedi - Composer
- Emtee - Featured Artist
- Jabulani Makhubo - Composer
- Lesego Kyle Mnyandu - Composer
- Mfanafuthi Nkosi - Composer
- Mnqobi Nxumalo - Composer
- Mthembeni Ndevu - Composer
- Nhlawulo Shipambuli Mashimbyi - Composer
- P-Jay - Featured Artist
- Phologo Mataboge - Composer
- Reece - Primary Artist
- Ronald Baloyi - Composer
- Ronald Lehlogonolo Mataboge - Composer
- Tumelo Thandokuhle Mathebula - Composer

== Release history ==
Country	Date	Format	Label
South Africa	21 October 2016	CD; download	Ambitiouz Entertainment
