= Ayanda Jiya =

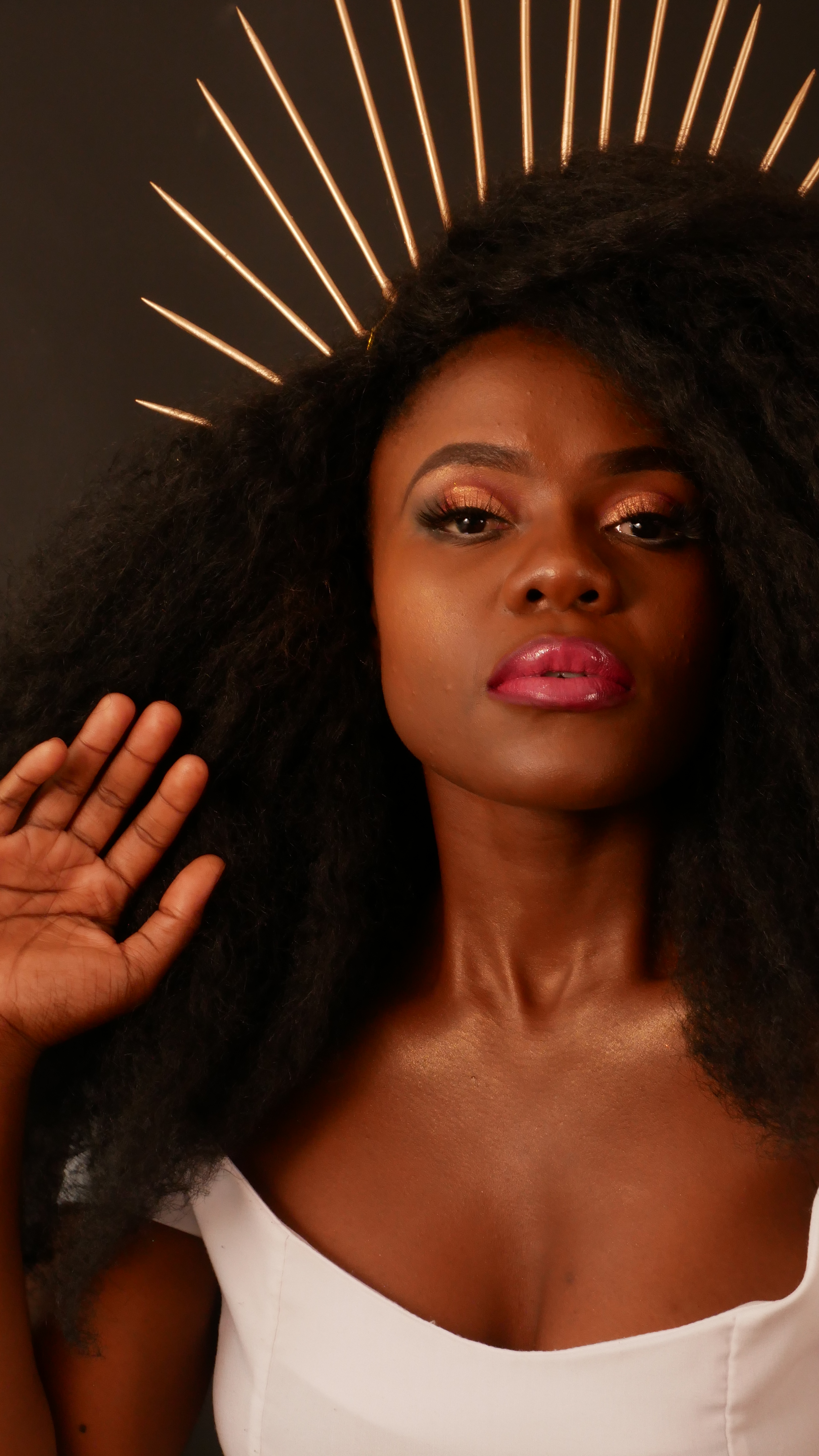

Background information
- Also known as: Ayanda Jiya, AJ
- Born: Sibongile Ayanda Sizwesiyanda Jiya; 18 June 1987 (age 39); Klerksdorp, North West, South Africa
- Origin: Johannesburg, South Africa
- Genres: R&B; Soul; House Music
- Occupations: Singer; songwriter; musician
- Instrument: Vocals
- Years active: 2010–present
- Labels: TinismDotc0m; Ayandastand Music; Zephbeats Studios (currently)

Sibongile Ayanda Sizwesiyanda Jiya (born June 18, 1987), known professionally as Ayanda Jiya, is a South African singer, songwriter and record producer, born in Klerksdorp, North West. She was signed under TinismDotc0m in 2010. Her single, "Go Go Girl," was released in 2014, which earned her a nomination for Best RnB Single at the 14th ceremony of the Metro FM Music Awards. She later departed from TinismDotc0m and partnered with Zephbeats Studios.

She released her first EP under TinismDotc0m titled V.I.C. (Very Intimate Conversations) (2014), which respectively produced the singles "Go Go Girl" and "Wrecking My Brain." The EP was removed from all streaming and digital platforms when she left TinismDotC0m in 2015. In 2017, they released Jiya's second EP, To Whom It May Concern.

== Life and career ==
=== Early life and career beginnings ===
Ayanda Jiya was born in Klerksdorp, a city in the North West Province. In 2007, she met Wax Lyrikal, a rapper and producer. Ayanda recorded her first song, entitled "Rescue Me," with J. Smallz in Arcadia, Pretoria. In 2010, Ayanda and Michael Sathekge (co-founder of TinismDotc0m) created instrumentals, which she recorded. She then released a single titled "Don't Let Me Go," produced by Wax Lyrikal. That was the first official song she recorded on the then-new indie label TinismDotc0m, which led to another song entitled "I'm Grateful." Ayanda Jiya later released another single titled "Happier Alone," produced by J. Smallz. She continued to work on her EP titled "Very Intimate Conversations (V.I.C.)," which was released in 2014. The lead single "Go Go Girl" (sound engineered by J. Smallz and Trompie Beatmochini) granted her a nomination for the 'Best R&B Single' at the 14th Metro FM Awards. The nomination led to international recognition, and in 2016, she was granted permission to perform in Sri Lanka performing in their capital city, Colombo at their annual jazz festival.

=== Growth and independence ===
In 2015, Ayanda Jiya parted ways with the label TinismDotc0m and took a break from the music scene. After a two-year break from music, she decided to become autonomous and start her own record label, "Ayandastand Music." In the same year, former label member Ginger Trill introduced Ayanda to record producer and sound engineer Simphiwe Mhlongo, known as Zeph/Zephbeats. Zephbeats, who has worked with the likes of Taiylor Manson, Riky Rick, Stogie T and A-Reece joined ventures with Ayandastand Music. Together, they worked on her second EP, 'To Whom It May Concern', which went number one on iTunes and Google Play. Ayanda's debut project, titled 'AYANDASTAND', dropped on August 8, 2019 and debuted at number one on iTunes and Google Play on the day of release. Guest features on the album include Stogie T, Ziyon and Naomi Parchment. The album was musically directed, produced, and mixed by producer/sound engineer Zephbeats, who has been working closely with Jiya since 2017.

Ayanda has worked with many South African artists, including Lady Zamar on the album King Zamar. She also appears on A-Reece's second studio album From Me to You and Only You, Stogie T's Honey and Pain Mixtape, Flame's CandyMan album, Ralf Gum's Progression album, Ginger Trill's Gang Tapes EP, and Sir LSG's Moving Circle album.

== Discography ==
=== Albums ===
Album title	Album details
Ayandastand	Released: 8 August 2019; Label: Ayandastand Music/Zephbeats Studios; Formats: Digital download

=== Extended Play ===
Album title	Album details
To Whom It May Concern	Released: 8 June 2017; Label: Ayandastand Music/Zephbeats Studios; Formats: Digital download

== Awards and nominations ==
Year	Award Ceremony	Prize	Work/Recipient	Result
2015	14th Metro FM Music Awards	Best R&B Single		Nominated
