= Soulitary =

Studio album by Zonke
- Released: December 2006
- Recorded: 2004–2006
- Genre: soul, rhythm and blues
- Label: Upper Street
- Producer: Various

Zonke chronology
Soulitary (2006)	Life, Love 'n Music (2007)

Soulitary is the debut studio album of South African singer-songwriter and record producer Zonke. The album was released in December 2006 in Germany, Japan and Italy.

== Track listing ==
1. "Listen"
2. "Betta Days"
3. "Wena Wedna"
4. "Groove Train" D M' Baye)
5. "I Wanna Thank You"
6. "Someday"
7. "Only You"
8. "Soulitary"
9. "It's Love"
10. "Phaphama"
11. "How Long"
12. "Across 110th Street"
13. "Take Me There"
14. "Ngena"
15. "Walk On" (D M' Baye)
16. "How Can I Say"
17. "Music"
18. "Someday (Remix)" (Bonus)

== Release history ==
List of release dates, showing region, formats, label, editions and reference
Region	Date	Format(s)	Label	Edition(s)
Germany; Japan; Italy	December 2006	CD	Upper Street Records	Standard
