= Avery (album) =

Studio album by Emtee
- Released: 4 December 2015
- Recorded: 2014–2015
- Genre: Trap
- Length: 73:02
- Language: English; Sesotho; Setswana; isiZulu; Xhosa
- Label: Ambitiouz Entertainment
- Producer: Emtee philani; Ruff; Tweezy; Bizz Boy

Emtee chronology
Avery (2015)	Manando (2017)

Singles from Avery
- 1. "Roll Up" Released: 22 April 2015; 2. "Roll Up Re-Up" Released: 27 November 2015; 3. "Pearl Thusi" Released: 22 January 2016; 4. "Ngeke" Released: 9 July 2016; 5. "We Up" Released: 7 October 2016; 6. "Winning" Released: 30 March 2017

Avery is the debut studio album by South African rapper and singer Emtee, released on 4 December 2015, through Ambitiouz Entertainment.

== Artwork ==
Album art was designed by Mpho Ngakane.

== Commercial performance ==
As of 22 January 2016, the album peaked at the top of the South African Hip hop / Rap iTunes Chart. The single "Roll Up" entered the top 3 of the South African Hip hop / Rap Singles Chart on iTunes.

As of July 2016, the album has since been certified platinum by RISA for selling over 40,000 units.

First Single From Avery Roll Up debuted at no. 3 on the SA Top 100 chart topping for 5 weeks in a row with that said Roll Up has been certified 3× Platinum by RiSA. Second single which is the remix which features SA Hip Hop heavyweight AKA and Nigerian star WizKid put released as Roll Up(Re-Up) peaked at no. 2 on the SA Top 100 chart charting in the top ten for 7 weeks until dropping to no.13 in its eighth week on the chart. Roll Up(Re-Up) has been since certified Platinum by RiSA.The Third single from Avery Pearl Thusi debuted at no.7 on the SA Top 100 chart and peaked at no.1 for 3 weeks in a row and has become one of the best songs in SA Hip Hop History. Pearl Thusi has since been certified Platinum by RiSA becoming Emtee's third Certified single Since Roll Up. Ngeke which features South African rapper, Fifi Cooper has since peaked at no.13 on the SA Top 100 chart. A promotional single titled Mama was released on mother's day to honour all mothers, and has since peaked at no.9 and was certified Gold by RiSA.The fifth single from Avery titled We Up was one of the biggest songs in SA in 2016 and is still the biggest song to ever drop in SA Hip Hop History. We Up peaked at no.7 on the SA TOP 100 becoming Emtee's fifth Top Ten Single and has since been certified Platinum by RiSA.

== Track listing ==
No.	Title	Writer(s)	Producer(s)	Length
1.	"About Me"	Mthembeni Ndevu; Mfanafuthi "Ruff" Nkosi		3:42
2.	"Feel Me Now"	M. Ndevu		3:50
3.	"We Up"	M. Ndevu; M. Nkosi		3:43
4.	"Dreams"	M. Ndevu; Bizz Boi	Bizz Boy	4:24
5.	"Winning" (featuring Nasty C)	Mthembeni Ndevu; Nsikayesizwe David Junior Ngcobo; Mnqobi Nxumalo; M. Mofokeng		4:27
6.	"Pray For Me"	M. Ndevu; M. Nxumalo		4:19
7.	"Mama"	M. Ndevu; M. Nkosi		3:32
8.	"Ready"	M. Ndevu; M. Nkosi		4:05
9.	"Roll Up"	M. Ndevu; K. Mahumapelo; M. Nkosi	Ruff	4:20
10.	"Pikipiki"	M. Ndevu; T. Dibakwane; Tumelo Thandokuhle Mathebula		3:20
11.	"Mamie Game"	M. Ndevu; M. Nkosi		4:26
12.	"U Got It"	M. Ndevu; M. Nkosi		3:46
13.	"Avery" (featuring Nondumiso)	Anele Mbishe; M. Ndevu; M. Nkosi		3:27
14.	"Where Were You"	M. Ndevu; M. Nkosi		4:02
15.	"Ngeke" (featuring Fifi Cooper)	M. Ndevu; Ronald Baloyi; Precious Mooketsi		4:28
16.	"Pearl Thusi"	M. Ndevu; M. Nkosi		3:46
17.	"Five-O"	K. Mahumapelo; Tumelo Thandokuhle Mathebula; M. Ndevu	Tweezy	4:40
18.	"Roll Up (Re-Up)" (featuring Wizkid and AKA)	M. Ndevu; Ayodeji Ibrahim Balogun; Kiernan Forbes	Ruff	4:45
Total length:				1:13:02

== Accolades ==
Avery won Best Hip Hop Album at Metro FM Music Awards and also won Best Rap Album at South African Music Awards.

Year	Awards ceremony	Award description(s)	Results
2016	15th Metro FM Music Awards	Best Hip Hop Album	Won
2016	22nd South African Music Awards	Best Rap Album	Won

== Certifications ==
Region	Certification	Certified units/Sales
South Africa (RiSA)	Platinum	30 000+
