= Feelings (Zonke song) =

Song by South African singer Zonke Dikana

- A still from the official music video.

Single by Zonke

from the album Ina Ethe
- Released: 12 July 2012
- Recorded: 2011
- Genre: Jazz
- Length: 4:22
- Label: TMP
- Songwriter: Zonke Dikana
- Producer: Zonke Dikana

Zonke singles chronology
"Ina Ethe" (2012)	"Feelings" (2012)	"Jik'Izinto" (2012)

Music video
- "Feelings" on YouTube

"Feelings" is a song by South African singer Zonke from her third studio album Ina Ethe (2011). It was released as the parent record's second single on 12 July 2012 through TMP Entertainment. Solely written and produced by the singer herself, "Feelings" is a jazz song that is accompanied by a combination of African drums and beats. The single was nominated for "Record of the Year" at the 2013 South African Music Awards, but lost to "Kulungile Baba" by Sifiso Ncwane in the category.

The accompanying music video was directed and produced by Shawn Borcherding and won the recognition of "Most Gifted Female Video" at the Channel O Music Video Awards, also in 2013. Zonke performed "Feelings" live on several occasions, including as part of the pre-show for select Lionel Richie concerts and during her 2013 Give and Take Live Tour. The live rendition would later be included on her first live album, Give and Take Live (2013).

== Background and composition ==
Following the commercial and radio success of the singer's previous single, "Ina Ethe", the track was commercially available for digital consumption on 12 July 2012 through TMP Entertainment. "Feelings" was solely written and produced by Zonke in 2011, who also instructed the instrumentation for its composition. She remarked that it is important for her to handle the production of her music as it displays her skills and sets her apart from other female musicians; unlike the majority of Zonke's catalogue, she sang "Feelings" and other tracks from Ina Ethe (2011) in the English language, instead of Xhosa. Lasting for a duration of four minutes and twenty-two seconds, the music incorporates the jazz genre through "a mixture of African drums and beats".

== Reception ==
A staff member from Channel O described "Feelings" as a highlight on Ina Ethe and appreciated Zonke for going "back to basics". The video for the song premiered on Channel O on 23 November 2012. At the 2013 South African Music Awards, "Feelings" was nominated under the "Record of the Year" category, the only of which to be decided by the public's vote. However, "Kulungile Baba" by Sifiso Ncwane won the award instead, in addition to "Album of the Year" for the same-titled work. The official accompanying music video for the song was released on 27 November 2012 and was directed by Shawn Borcherding; the visual displays Zonke performing "Feelings" in a variety of different dark-toned rooms. It won the "Most Gifted Female Video" category at the 2013 Channel O Music Video Awards.

=== Accolades ===
Year	Award ceremony	Prize	Result	Ref
2013	2013 South African Music Awards	Record of the Year	Nominated	
2013	2013 Channel O Music Video Awards	Most Gifted Female Video	Won	

== Promotion ==
As part of Lionel Richie's 2016 All the Hits, All Night Long world tour, it was announced in February of the same year that Zonke would open all five of the South African shows. Regarding the press release, she stated: "And I am especially excited to be sharing the stage with Lionel Richie who I have admired for taking pride in his art. This is an opportunity for South Africans to experience a quality production." Beginning 13 March 2016, the singer gave a live rendition of "Feelings" and also sang songs "S.O.S" and "Release Me". During her own Give and Take Live Tour, she performed "Feelings" during the conclusion of "Spring" section of the concert, which was accompanied by her songs "When All Is Said and Done" and "Mzi Ka Phalo". The aforementioned series was released on both versions of her 2013 live album, Give and Take Live, as part of a collaboration with Sony Music Entertainment and Leely Music.
