= Logan (album) =

EMTee third studio album

Studio album by Emtee
- Released: 9 April 2021
- Genre: Hip hop
- Length: 58:32
- Label: Emtee Records
- Producer: BFB; Black Tears; IPappi; Johnny Basz; J-Smash; KnifeBeatz; Master BC; Ruff; Young2unnBeats

Emtee chronology
| DIY2 (2018) | Logan (2021) | D.I.Y 3 (2024) |

Singles from Logan
- 1. "Wave" Released: January 29, 2020; 2. "Johustleburg" Released: May 8, 2020; 3. "Brand New Day (feat. Lolli Native)" Released: January 29, 2020

Logan (stylized LOGAN) is the third studio album by South African rapper and singer Emtee, released by Emtee Records on April 9, 2021, and features guest appearances from Lolli Native, Moozlie, J Smash, Flash Ikumkani as well as Malawian rapper Gwamba. The album was produced by Ruff and others. Emtee renamed this album after his second born Logan.

The album was preceded by three singles: "Wave", "Logan","Johustleburg", "Brand New Day" featuring Lolli Native. It debuted at number 1 on the Apple Music charts in South Africa.

== Critical reception ==
Logan generally received positive reviews from music critics, Sekese Rasephei from OkayAfrica called the album "All in all, LOGAN is a solid addition to Emtee's rich discography". Unorthodox's staff said "The project is authentic and executed in true eMtee style with a few surprises that Hip Hop lovers globally will appreciate".

== Title ==
The albums title was named after his second-born son, Logan.

== Awards and nominations ==
List of awards and nomination received by LOGAN
| Year | Award | Category | Result | Ref |
|---|---|---|---|---|
| 2021 | South African Hip Hop Awards | Album of the year | Nominated | |
| 2022 | South African Music Awards | Best Hip Hop Album | Nominated | |

== Track listing ==
| No. | Title | Writer(s) | Producer(s) | Length |
|---|---|---|---|---|
| 1. | "Revolutionary" | Mthembeni Ndevu | Master BC | 03:04 |
| 2. | "Logan" | Mthembeni Ndevu | BFB | 02:27 |
| 3. | "Long Way" | Mthembeni Ndevu | KnifeBeatz | 04:41 |
| 4. | "Pressure" | Mthembeni Ndevu | Master BC | 04:43 |
| 5. | "Wave" | Mthembeni Ndevu | Ruf | 04:18 |
| 6. | "iThemba" | Mthembeni Ndevu | Ruff; Master BC | 03:15 |
| 7. | "Uzoyimela" (featuring Gwamba) | Mthembeni Ndevu; Gwamba | BFB | 03:15 |
| 8. | "Slide" | Mthembeni Ndevu | Ruff | 02:46 |
| 9. | "Johustleburg" | Mthembeni Ndevu | Ruff | 03:56 |
| 10. | "Brand New Day" (featuring Lolli Native) | Mthembeni Ndevu; Lolli Native | Ruff | 03:17 |
| 11. | "Where I'm at" | Mthembeni Ndevu; Ruff | Ruff | 03:31 |
| 12. | "Saam Sokol'" (featuring Moozlie) | Mthembeni Ndevu; Moozlie; M'du Masilela | Ruff | 02:58 |
| 13. | "Family" | Mthembeni Ndevu | Young2unnBeats | 04:37 |
| 14. | "All my life" | Mthembeni Ndevu; Tuckshop Bafanaz | Black Tears | 03:47 |
| 15. | "Laqhasha" (featuring Lolli Native and Flash Ikumkani) | Mthembeni Ndevu; Flash Ikumkani; Lolli Native | Johnny Basz | 04:59 |
| 16. | "Come Closer" (featuring J Smash) | Mthembeni Ndevu | IPappi; J-Smash | 02:58 |
| Total length: | | | | 58:32 |
