= Runaway (Cici song) =

2015 debut single by Cici

Single by Cici
- Released: 20 October 2015
- Recorded: 2015
- Venue: Gauteng
- Genre: R&B; Afro-pop
- Length: 4:21
- Label: 999 music
- Songwriters: Busisiwe Thwala; Arthur Mafokate; W. Mahlangu

Cici singles chronology
| "Runaway" (2015) | "Wena Wedwa" (2023) |

Music video
- "Runaway (Official music video)" on YouTube

"Runaway", is the debut R&B single by South African singer-songwriter known under the alias of CiCi, it was released on 20 October 2015 under 999 Music and was co-written by Arthur Mafokate.

In 2016 the song was nominated by the Metro FM Music Awards for two categories, for Best R&B single and for Best Styled Video, the song came out victorious in both categories.

== Awards and nominations ==
| Year | Award ceremony | Category | Recipient/Nominated work | Results | Ref. |
|---|---|---|---|---|---|
| 2016 | Metro FM Music Awards | Best R&B Single | "Runaway" | Won | |
| 2016 | Metro FM Music Awards | Best Styled Video | "Runaway" | Won | |
| 2016 | Metro FM Music Awards | Best Compilation Feature | | Won | |
