= A-Reece =

South African rapper (born 1996)

- Also known as: The Boy Doing Things; Baby Boy; Young King; The Big Hearted Bad Guy; |Slime
- Born: Lehlogonolo Ronald Mataboge; 27 March 1997 (age 29); Danville ext. 3, Pretoria, Gauteng, South Africa
- Origin: Pretoria, Gauteng, South Africa
- Genre: Hip-hop
- Occupations: Rapper; record producer; songwriter
- Years active: 2011–present
- Labels: Ambitiouz Entertainment (former); The Wrecking Crew (former); Rubberbandgang (former); Revenge Club Records (current)
- Website: babyboy1606.com

Lehlogonolo Ronald Mataboge (born 27 March 1997), known professionally as A-Reece, is a South African rapper, songwriter and record producer. He was born and raised in Pretoria, Gauteng.

At the age of 16, A-Reece was signed under Raw X Productions by South African Hip-Hop music producer pH Raw X. He gained national prominence under Ambitiouz Entertainment in 2015, following the release of his single, "Couldn't", which featured Emtee. A-Reece released his debut studio album, Paradise (2016) which produced the singles, "Couldn't" and "Mgani". After disputes with the label's management, A-Reece left Ambitiouz to become an independent artist late 2016.

In 2017, A-Reece collaborated with his friends and producer Mashbeatz to establish The Wrecking Crew. In those studio sessions, he released his second album From Me to You & Only You. In 2018, he released a collaborative album with Ecco the Beast and Wordz titled Long Lost Letters (L3), the lead single was "Welcome to My Life". In October that year he released his fifth EP, And I'm Only 21. In 2019, he released Reece Effect.

In 2021, A-Reece signed a distribution deal with Apple Music-owned A&R company Platoon, which specializes in packaging emerging artists before they get a major-label contract, and his mixtape Today's Tragedy, Tomorrow's Memory: The Mixtape was publicised in Forbes, Clash and Flaunt magazines.

A-Reece's third studio album P2: The Big Hearted Bad Guy (2023), debuted at number one in South Africa.

On 2025 A-reece released an album BUSINESS AS USUAL.

A-reece is also a brand ambassador for compaVans clothig.

== Early life and career ==
Lehlogonolo was born on 27 March 1997 and came from Danville, Pretoria, Gauteng. He started writing music in primary school following the footsteps of his older brother Phologo Jody Mataboge, known as Jay Jody from the hip-hop duo B3nchMarQ. He got his stage name A-Reece from his star sign Aries.

=== 2014-16 ===
In 2014, A-Reece released an EP titled Browniez EP. In 2015, A-Reece signed to Ambitiouz Entertainment and released his first single "Couldn't" under the label, featuring Emtee. He released Cutaways, an EP, on 29 September 2016, which consists of songs that did not make the cut for his debut album Paradise. His debut album was later released on 21 October 2016, and topped the No.1 spot on iTunes just under 24 hours after its release.

=== 2017 ===
Following a financial squabble with Ambitiouz Entertainment, he formed the Wrecking Crew (TWC) in 2017 with MashBeatz, Flvme & B3nchMarQ. The Wrecking Crew consisted of A-Reece, MashBeatz,FLVME, Ex Global, Ecco the Beast, Mellow Don Picasso , IMP THA DON, Wordz, Ghoust Trvpbully, Enkei, Louw, Kri$h, Tyga Bankz and Thando Nje. He released a single "Meanwhile in Honeydew" early in 2017. On 21 October, he released his second album From Me to You & Only You, which included Feelings featuring FLVME.

=== 2018 ===
In 2018, he released "A Real N*gga Tale", which featured 1000 Degreez, and then released a collaborative album with Ecco the Beast and Wordz titled Long Lost Letters (L3), the lead single was "Welcome to My Life". Mataboge then released two EPs, Gwan Big Up Urself 2 in March and in October his fifth EP, And I'm Only 21. Early in 2018 Flvme, Ecco the Beast and Mellow Don Picasso left the Wrecking Crew due to financial disputes.

=== 2019 ===
In 2019, A‑Reece released a single, "Carele$$", to address his squabble with Flvme. He then released his second collaborative album with MashBeatz titled "Reece Effect". The Wrecking Crew later changed its name to Rvbberband Records.

=== 2020 ===
In 2020, A-Reece had a fallout with MashBeatz and this led to him collaborating with his older brother Jay Jody. He also released a number of singles, including "$elfish [Exp.2]", which lead up to the release of his mixtape Today's Tragedy, Tomorrow's Memory.

=== 2021 ===
In 2021, he released his second mixtape Today's Tragedy, Tomorrow's Memory containing 13 tracks. He also released his third collaborative album, Heaven Can Wait: The Narrow Door, Vol. 1, with Jay Jody. The album included "The Confrontation", which is a song that addresses his beef with his former producer MashBeatz. In December 2022, A-Reece was featured in Africa Cypher (Hennessy Cypher) that took place in Nigeria, which also featured artists such as Vector, M.I Abaga, M.anifest and Octopizzo.

=== 2023-present: P2: The Big Hearted Bad Guy ===
His third studio album P2: The Big Hearted Bad Guy, was released on 20 October 2023. It was supported by two singles: "Bruce Wayne" and "Ving Rhames".

P2: The Big Hearted Bad Guy debuted number 1 on iTunes All Genres Top 200 Chart, became his first album to reach the summit of the chart.

"Ving Rhames" debuted No. 47 on International Top 200 and No. 16 on the Local Top 100 respectively. In addition "God Laughs" reached No. 17 on the Local Top 100 and No. 16 on International Charts respectively.

His studio mixtape with PistolWhipPapi Kill The King: the mixtape, was released on 13 September 2024 . The mixtape debuted number one on iTunes, and acquired 3 million streams on Spotify in just a week.

== Endorsement ==
He is well known for his collaboration with a clothing brand Vans. and back in 2019 he had fans speculating whether he was sponsored by Nike.

== Ambitiouz Entertainment controversy ==
Ambitiouz Entertainment came under scrutiny after artists Fifi Cooper, B3nchMarQ, A-Reece and Flvme left the label in a public dispute. Artists claimed that they decided to part ways with the record label because of financial disagreements. Fifi Cooper went on to say that she had been signed for over two years to the label yet had not received any payment for her performances, as well as royalties. The record label also went on to remove all of A-Reece's music videos from their YouTube channel and his Facebook page was also deleted. A-Reece released "Loyal" where he addressed his reason for leaving Ambitious Entertainment. In the song A-Reece slammed his former colleague Emtee for staying with the record label. Seven months later on his album Manando, Emtee responded with a diss track called "Crown" calling A-Reece "whack" and "emotional" on songs.

== Discography ==
=== Studio albums ===
List of studio albums, with selected chart positions and certifications
Title	Details	Peak chart positions
Title	Details	ZA
Paradise	Released: 21 October 2016; Label: Ambitiouz Entertainment; Format: Digital download	1
From Me to You and Only You	Released: 21 October 2017; Label: The Wrecking Crew; Format: Digital download	1
P2: The Big Hearted Bad Guy	Released: 20 October 2023; Label: Revenge Club Records; Format: Digital download	1
"—" denotes a recording that did not chart or was not released in that territory.

=== Mixtapes ===
Title	Details
Forever King	Released: 11 May 2013; Label: XLR Media; Format: digital download
Today's Tragedy, Tomorrow's Memory: The Mixtape	Released: 26 March 2021; Label: A-Reece; Format: digital download
Kill The King: the mixtape	Released: 13 September 2024; Label: Revenge Club Records; Format: Digital download, Streaming

=== Collaborative albums ===
Title	Details
L3 (Long Lost Letters) (with Ecco & Wordz)	Released: 15 June 2018; Label: The Wrecking Crew; Format: digital download
Reece Effect (with MashBeatz)	Released: 1 April 2019; Label: The Wrecking Crew; Format: digital download
Heaven Can Wait (The Narrow Door vol. 1) (with Jay Jody & Blue Tape)	Released: 10 December 2021; Label: Revenge Club; Format: Digital download

=== Extended plays ===
Title	Details
Browniez	Released: 31 October 2014; Label: MyThron, Raw X; Format: digital download
1997/03/27 (The Best Things in Life Are Free)	Released: 27 March 2015; Label: A-Reece; Format: digital download
CUTaways	Released: 29 September 2016; Label: Ambitiouz Entertainment; Format: digital download
Gwan Big Up Urself 2 (You Should've Taken Me Seriously)	Released: 26 March 2018; Label: The Wrecking Crew; Format: digital download
And I'm Only 21	Released: 21 October 2018; Label: The Wrecking Crew; Format: digital download
The Burning Tree	Released: 20 April 2022; Label: Revenge Club Records; Format: Digital download
Deadlines: Free P2	Released: 21 October 2022; Label: Revenge Club Records; Format: Digital download
Business As Usual	Released:8 September 2025; Label: Revenge Club Records; Format: Digital download

=== Singles ===
==== As lead artist ====
List of singles as lead artist, with certifications, showing year released and album name
Title	Year	Album
"Come Up"	2014	Non-album single
"Couldn't" (featuring Emtee)	2015	Paradise
"Mgani"	2015	Paradise
"?"	2017	Non-album singles
"Sloppy"	2017	Non-album singles
"Meanwhile in Honeydew"	2017	Non-album singles
"FourTwenty 4:20" (featuring Flame, Ecco and Ex-Global)	2017	Non-album singles
"Feelings" (featuring Flame)	2017	From Me to You and Only You
"Kim Kardashian" (featuring Ex-Global and Wordz)	2018	Non-album singles
"Amber Rose"	2018	Non-album singles
"Welcome 2 My Life" (with Ecco and Wordz)	2019	Long Lost Letters (L3)
"A Message From Reece"	2019	Non-album singles
"Blood in Blood Out"	2019	Non-album singles
"Carele$$"	2019	Non-album singles
"In Hi$ Image [Exp.1]"	2020	The Exp$
"$elfish [Exp.2]"	2020	The Exp$
"Formula [Exp.3]"	2020	The Exp$
"John Doe [Last Exp.]"	2020	The Exp$
"$trictly for My Bitch"	2021	Non-album single
"Re$idual Self-Image" (featuring Ayanda Jiya)	2021	Today's Tragedy, Tomorrow's Memory: The Mixtape
"The 5 Year Plan" (featuring Wordz)	2021	Today's Tragedy, Tomorrow's Memory: The Mixtape
"Morning Peace" (featuring Jay Jody)	2021	Today's Tragedy, Tomorrow's Memory: The Mixtape
"Tuff Luck" (with Jay Jody & Blue Tape)	2021	Heaven Can Wait (The Narrow Door vol. 1)
"Ridiculou$" (with Jay Jody & Blue Tape)	2021	Heaven Can Wait (The Narrow Door vol. 1)
"Couldn't Have Said It Better Part 3"	2022	Non-album single
"Bruce Wayne"	2023	P2: The Big Hearted Bad Guy
"Ving Rhames"	2023	P2: The Big Hearted Bad Guy
Str8 to hell	2024	Kill The King: the mixtape
Mad	2024	Non-album single

=== Guest appearances ===
Title	Year	Other artist(s)	Album
Deep Waters	2024	25K	Loyal To The Plug : The Life & Death Of Don Kilograms
"Got the Feeling (Interlude)"	2024	Kelvin Momo	Sewe
Dilemma	2025	K.Keed	Bite The Bullet
Four Horsemen	2025	Stogie T ,Nasty C, Maggz & AReece	Anomy

== Awards and nominations ==
Award	Year	Recipient(s) and nominee(s)	Category	Results	Ref.
South African Hip Hop Awards	2016	Himself	Lyricist of the year	Won	
South African Hip Hop Awards	2016	"Couldn't" (featuring Emtee)	Best video	Nominated	
South African Hip Hop Awards	2016	"Ameni" (with Miss Pru, Fifi Cooper, Emtee, B3nchmarq, Saudi and Sjava)	Best video	Won	
South African Hip Hop Awards	2016	"Ameni" (with Miss Pru, Fifi Cooper, Emtee, B3nchmarq, Saudi and Sjava)	Song of the year	Nominated	
South African Hip Hop Awards	2016	"Ameni" (with Miss Pru, Fifi Cooper, Emtee, B3nchmarq, Saudi and Sjava)	Best Collabo	Won	
South African Hip Hop Awards	2021	Himself	Lyricist of the year	Won	
South African Hip Hop Awards	2021	Today's Tragedy, Tomorrow's Memory: The Mixtape	Mixtape of the year	Won	
South African Hip Hop Awards	2021	Himself	Artist of the decade	Lost	
South African Hip Hop Awards	2021	"The 5 Year Plan" (feat. Wordz) Directed by (SXMZX for Poison Cure Productions)	Best video	Lost	
South African Hip Hop Awards	2021	"Hustlers Prayer" (with 25K) Directed by (Nate Thomas for Uprooted Media)	Best video	Nominated	
South African Hip Hop Awards	2021	"Hustlers Prayer" (with 25K) Directed by (Nate Thomas for Uprooted Media)	Best Collaboration	Lost	
MTV Africa Music Awards	2021	Himself	Best Fanbase	Cancelled	
South African Music Awards	2022	Himself	Artist of the year	Lost	
South African Music Awards	2022	Today's Tragedy, Tomorrow's Memory: The Mixtape	Best Hip Hop Album	Lost	
