= Nompumelelo Mqwebu =

South African chef (born 1977)

- Born: 1977 (age 48–49); KwaZulu-Natal
- Occupations: Chef and author

Nompumelelo Mqwebu (born 1977) is a South African chef and author. In 2018, her book, Through the Eyes of an African Chef, was named the world's best self-published cookbook at the Gourmand World Cookbook Awards which took place in China. The Gourmand World Cook Awards is an international competition that honours the best food and wine books.

== Early years and education ==
Mqwebu was born on the North coast in KwaZulu-Natal, but grew up in Umlazi. She studied marketing management at Centec College, acquired a Culinary Diploma from City and Guilds of London Institute, and trained as a cook at the Chef School of Food and Wine in Morningside, Durban, and Ballymaloe Cookery School in Ireland.

== Career ==
Mqwebu worked in supply chain and logistics of commodities and textiles for a while before branching into cooking in 2005. She is the founder of the Mzansi International Culinary Festival (MICF) and Africa Meets Europe Cuisine. Prior to establishing Africa Meets Europe Cuisine, she worked at Janet's Restaurant in Kloof and Zimbali Lodge.

== Works ==
- She is the author for Through the Eyes of an African Chef. This book features traditional African classics and recipes using African ingredients but with a modern twist.

== Personal life ==
She is a mother of two sons.

== Awards ==
2018 – Her book won the Gourmand World Cookbook Awards
