= L.O.V.E (Zonke album) =

2015 Zonke fifth album

- Standard cover

Studio album by Zonke
- Released: June 14, 2018
- Studio: TMP Entertainment
- Genre: Funk; Soul; World
- Length: 39:21
- Label: Sony Music Entertainment
- Producer: Zonke

Zonke chronology
Work of Heart (2015)	L.O.V.E (2018)	Enigma (2022)

L.O.V.E. (Living Out of Various Emotions) is the fifth studio album by South African singer-songwriter and music producer Zonke. It was released on June 14, 2018, in South Africa by Sony Music Entertainment. It features a production from Zonke Dikana, Alex D. Samuel, Herb Powers Jr. The album features a guest appearance by Kwesta.

It has been certified platinum by Recording Industry of South Africa (RiSA).

== Commercial performance ==
The album was certified with a gold plaque within five months after its release by the Recording industry of South Africa (RiSA) with sales of over 20,000 copies.

== Accolades ==
L.O.V.E. earned Zonke awards and nominations. At the 25th annually ceremony of South African Music Awards, L.O.V.E. was nominated for Album of the Year, Female Artist of the Year and won Best R&B/Soul Album

Year	Nominee / work	Award	Result
2018	L.O.V.E.	Album of the Year	Nominated
2018	L.O.V.E.	Best R&B/Soul Album	Won
2018	L.O.V.E.	Female Artist of the Year	Nominated

== Tracklisting ==
No.	Title	Length
1.	"NdiliMpondo"	4:08
2.	"Uphelelwa Lixesha"	4:16
3.	"Intliziyo"	4:56
4.	"Soul To keep (featuring Kwesta)"	5:07
5.	"Tonight"	5:43
6.	"Best Days Of My Life"	3:39
7.	"L.O.V.E."	4:24
8.	"Uyandithanda"	4:09
9.	"Ndiyah'thembisa"	4:19
Total length:		39,21

== Certifications ==
Region	Certification	Certified units/Sales
South Africa (RiSA)	Platinum	40,000+

== Personnel ==
All credits adapted from Discogs.

=== Instrument ===
- Amaechi Ikechi – Bass Guitar (tracks: 2–9)
- Guitar – Cameron Ward (tracks: 4, 5, 8, 9), Khumo Kganyago (tracks: 3), Shawn Van Staden (tracks: 2, 3)
- Alex D. Samuel – Keyboards, Piano, Synthesizer
- Mixed By – Don Laka (tracks: 2, 6, 8), Jürgen Von Wechmar (tracks: 1, 3–5, 7, 9), Mazwe Mtetwa (tracks: 2, 6, 8)
- Mabeleng Moholo – Percussion (tracks: 4, 5)

=== Production ===
- Zonke Dikana – Producer, Lyrics, Music, Arranged, Lead Vocals, Backing Vocals
- Alex D. Samuel, Oyama Songo – Recording Engineer
- Herb Powers Jr. – Mastered

== Release history ==
List of release dates, showing region, formats, label, editions and reference
Region	Date	Format(s)	Label	Edition(s)	Ref.
South Africa	14 June 2018	CD; digital download	Sony Music Entertainment	Standard	
