= Ina Ethe =

Studio album by Zonke
- Released: 1 October 2011
- Recorded: 2010–2011
- Studio: B&S Studio
- Genre: Jazz, afrosoul
- Label: TMP
- Producer: Zonke Dikana

Zonke chronology
Life, Love 'n Music (2007)	Ina Ethe (2011)	Give and Take Live (2013)

Singles from Ina Ethe
- 1. "Ina Ethe" Released: 2012; 2. "Feelings" Released: 12 July 2012; 3. "Jik'Izinto" Released: 2012

Ina Ethe is the second studio album of South African singer-songwriter and record producer Zonke. Solely produced and written by Zonke, Ina Ethe was released on 1 October 2011 through TMP Entertainment.

== Commercial reception ==
Upon its release, Ina Ethe was certified double platinum by the Recording Industry of South Africa with over 80, 000 units sold. The album was also nominated in three music categories at the 18th South African Music Awards.

== Critical reception ==
Professional ratings
Review scores
Source	Rating
Channel O	4/5 stars
Just Curious	8/10 stars

Ina Ethe was received to positive reviews among music critics. It was rated 4 stars out of 5 by Channel O, with the critic further stating that the album "sounds like it was definitely made for consumption and listening.". Zamani Khethelo of Just Curious gave the album 8 starts out of 10, stating that, "Overall this is a beautiful album and it deserves its place in your music collection".

== Track listing ==
No.	Title	Length
1.	"Ina Ethe"
2.	"Uzohamb’ubuye"
3.	"Viva the Legend"
4.	"Ngomso"
5.	"Feelings"
6.	"Jik'Izinto"
7.	"Nameless"
8.	"Thank You for Loving Me"
9.	"I Know a Place"
10.	"Mzi Kaphalo"
11.	"When All is Said and Gone"
12.	"Sobabini"
13.	"Chivalry is Dead"
14.	"My Song"

== Release history ==
List of release dates, showing region, formats, label, editions and reference
Region	Date	Format(s)	Label	Edition(s)	Ref.
South Africa	1 October 2011	CD; digital download; Vinyl	TMP Entertainment	Standard	

== Accolades ==
Year	Award ceremony	Prize	Result	Ref
2012	18th South African Music Awards	Best African Adult Album	Won	
2012	18th South African Music Awards	Album of the Year	Nominated	
2013	2013 Metro FM Music Awards	Best Produced Album	Nominated	
2013	2013 Metro FM Music Awards	Best Female Album	Won	
