= Manando (album) =

Studio album by Emtee
- Released: 15 September 2017
- Studio: Ambitiouz Studios
- Genre: Hip-hop; R&B
- Length: 81:00
- Label: Ambitiouz Entertainment
- Producer: Ruff; Tweezy; Christer; Lunatik; BizzBoy; Co-Kayn; Lisa Nojoko

Emtee chronology
Avery (2015)	Manando (2017)	DIY 2 (2018)

Manando is the second studio album by South African rapper and singer Emtee, released by Ambitiouz Entertainment on September 15, 2017 and features guest appearances from fellow Ambitiouz label-mates Sjava and Saudi, as well as Nigerian singer Tiwa Savage. The album was produced by Ruff, Tweezy, Christer, Lunatik, Ron Epidemic and Bizz Boy.

== Title ==
According to Emtee, the album was named after his late "street brother" and the cover art was designed by Mpho Ngakane.

== Track listing ==
No.	Title	Writer(s)	Producer(s)	Length
1.	"Platinum"	Mthembeni Ndevu	Lunatik	03:39
2.	"I Try"	Mthembeni Ndevu	Ruff	04:36
3.	"Me and You" (featuring Tiwa Savage)	Mthembeni Ndevu; Tiwa Savage	Christer	03:41
4.	"Manando"	Mthembeni Ndevu	Ruff	04:20
5.	"Plug"	Mthembeni Ndevu; Anele Mbisha	Tweezy	04:07
6.	"Ghetto Hero"	Mthembeni Ndevu; Jolondy Jacobs	Ruff	03:53
7.	"All Night"	Mthembeni Ndevu	Emtee; Ruff	03:34
8.	"My Crown"	Mthembeni Ndevu	Co-Kayn Beats	03:33
9.	"My OG"	Mthembeni Ndevu	Lunatik	04:44
10.	"Bambelela"	Mthembeni Ndevu	Lunatik	04:33
11.	"Jets"	Mthembeni Ndevu	Ruff	04:02
12.	"Emazweni"	Mthembeni Ndevu	BizzBoy; Ruff	03:54
13.	"Corner Store"	Mthembeni Ndevu	Tweezy	04:00
14.	"Ubuya Nin"	Mthembeni Ndevu	Ruff	04:20
15.	"Pour Up"	Mthembeni Ndevu	Ruff	03:44
16.	"RIP Swati" (featuring Saudi, Sjava and Njabulo)	Mthembeni Ndevu; Anele Mbisha; Sjava	Ruff	04:06
17.	"Summertime High" (featuring Saudi)	Mthembeni Ndevu; Anele Mbisha	Christer	03:46
18.	"No More"	Mthembeni Ndevu	Ruff	04:31
19.	"Take Flight"	Mthembeni Ndevu	Ruff	04:10
20.	"Thank You"	Mthembeni Ndevu	Emtee; Lisa Nojoko	03:32
Total length:				81:00

== Accolades ==
At 25th South African Music Awards Manando received a nomination for Male Artist of the year and Best hip hop album category.

Year	Nominee / work	Award	Result
2018	Manando	Male Artist of the year	Nominated
2018	Manando	Best hip hop album	Nominated

== Personnel ==
Manando credits are adapted from AllMusic.

- Mfanafuthi Nkosi - Composer
- Christer Kobedi - Composer
- Ronald Baloyi - Composer
- Bhekimuzi Baphanga - Composer
- Jabulani Makhubo - Composer
- Tumelo Thandokuhle Mathebula - Composer
- Anele Mbishe - Composer
- Ndivhuwo Cayenne Mudimeli - Composer
- Mthembeni Ndevu(eMTee) - Composer, Primary Artist
- Lisa Mbalentle Nojoko - Composer
- Mnqobi Nxumalo - Composer
- Saudi - Featured Artist
- Tiwa Savage - Featured Artist
- Sjava - Featured Artist

== Release history ==
Release dates and formats for Manando
Region	Date	Format(s)	Edition(s)	Label	Ref.
South Africa	15 September 2017	Digital download; streaming	Standard	Ambitiouz Entertainment	
