= Zonke =

South African singer-songwriter

- Born: Zonke Dikana; 11 October 1979 (age 46); KwaZakhele, Port Elizabeth, Eastern Cape, South Africa
- Origin: Johannesburg, South Africa
- Genres: Soul; R&B; house
- Occupations: Singer-songwriter; record producer
- Instrument: Vocals
- Years active: 1997–Present
- Label: Sony
- Website: zonkedikana.com

Zonke Dikana (born 11 October 1979), known simply as Zonke, is a South African singer-songwriter and record producer. Her rise to stardom came in 2011 following the release of her third album, Ina Ethe, which was certified double platinum and was nominated at the 18th South African Music Awards. In 2013, she recorded and released Give and Take Live, which was certified gold just two months after its release and earned her a place in the Channel O list of "Africa's Top 10 Female Singing Sensations". In September 2015, Zonke released Work of Heart, her fifth album, to critical acclaim with nominations in several categories at the 15th Metro FM Music Awards and 22nd South African Music Awards. She signed a record deal to Sony Music Entertainment in 2013. On 15 June 2018, she released L.O.V.E, her fifth studio album, with Sony.

== Early life and education ==
Zonke was born in KwaZakhele, Eastern Cape, South Africa. Her father, Vuyisile Dikana, was a drummer for a group called Black Slave and the Flamingo, her mother, Fundiswa Peter, was a medical technician while her late stepmother Anneline Malebo was a singer for a musical band known as Joy. She is a young sister to Lulu Dikana who is also a music artist. She is an alumna of the University of the Free State, from where she graduated with a degree in human resource management in 1997.

== Career ==
=== 1996–2007: early beginnings, Soulitary and Life, Love 'n Music ===
During Zonke's early years as a singer, Chippa introduced her to several artists, including Ringo, Joe Nina and Deborah Fraser, who she worked with either in writing or vocal capabilities. Zonke had her big break when she wrote a song titled "Africa, My Motherland" for the band Jazzkantine, based in Germany. The band later became known as Culture Clan after Zonke and the rappers Mandla and Mzo.

In 2003, Culture Clan released an album titled Africa. It was released in Germany, winning awards from the Channel O and Metro FM Music Awards. During her time in Germany, Zonke's first studio album, Soulitary, was released by Upper Street Records with distribution in Germany, Japan and Italy in 2004. In 2007, Kalawa Jazmee Records released her second album, Life, Love 'n Music.

=== 2008–13: Ina Ethe and Give and Take Live ===
In June 2011, Zonke left Kalawa Jamzee for TMP Records and started to record Ina Ethe, her third studio album. Preceding the album's release were two singles, "Jik'Izinto" and "Feelings". Ina Ethe was self-produced and was released by TMP Records to critical reviews. The album did well commercially, going double platinum.

On 25 October 2013, Zonke recorded a live album at the Lyric Theatre in Goldreef City, Johannesburg, released by Sony Music Entertainment as Give and Take Live. The album achieved gold status within two months of its release. Give and Take Live also won two category awards at the 20th South African Music Awards.

=== 2014–2017: Work of Heart ===
Following the death of Zonke's older sister Lulu Dikana, Zonke started working on her fourth studio album, Work of Heart, by releasing the singles "Reach It" and "Meet Me in My Dreams". In an interview with Katlego Mkhwanazi of The Mail & Guardian, Zonke said that the album was inspired by everything that happened to her. The album contains 13 songs and was released on 11 September 2015 by Sony Music Entertainment. Work of Heart was nominated in the Best Female Album and Best African Pop Album categories at the 15th Metro FM Music Awards. It was also nominated in five categories at the 22nd South African Music Awards, winning one. On 14 July 2016, it was certified platinum.

At 2017 South African Afro Music Awards, she was nominated for; Best Afro Female Artist, Best Adult Contemporary, Best Afro Album, Best Afro Producer and won Best Afro-soul Album award.

=== 2018-2019: L.O.V.E ===
Her seventh studio album, L.O.V.E, was released on 15 June 15, 2018. It is a 9-track album featuring Kwesta on a song titled "Soul to Keep". In April 2018, Zonke released the lead single "Tonight", which had platinum sales. The album was certified gold with sales of 25 000 units.

L.O.V.E. was nominated for Album of the Year, Female Artist of the Year and won Best R&B/Soul Album at the 25th annually ceremony

=== 2020-present: Enigma Tour, Embo ===
Zonke embarked on Zonke: The Evergreen In Concert on February 19 in Cape Town, Grand Arena, GrandWest; the tour included 10 dates that ran through to February 29.

In October 2021, her single "Lady" was released as album's lead single.

On April 22, 2022, she announced that her upcoming album Enigma, has done recording it, scheduled to be release on May 27.

In April 26, she teased an art cover of her second single "Oko", via her Facebook. The song was released on April 29, 2022. It debuted number one in South Africa.

Her studio album Embo, was released on 3 November 2023. To further promote the album Zonke announced 3 dates national tour commerced on April 29 at the Grand Arena, Cape Town.

== Tours and notable performances ==
On 5 July 2013, Zonke performed and recorded her live album Give and Take Live at a sold-out concert at the Lyric Theatre in Johannesburg after it was postponed following the death of her sister Busisiwe Dikana. On 20 March 2016, Zonke performed at the Ticketpro Dome in Johannesburg alongside American soul singer Lionel Richie, who was touring South Africa as part of his "All The Hits All Night Long" tour.

== Artistry ==
Zonke Dikana is a versatile singer who sings in English and Xhosa language. During her time as a Kalawa Jazmee Records artist, her genre of music was mostly house music before she switched to afrosoul and neo soul on signing to TMP Entertainment. Her musical influences include Sade, Busi Mhlongo, Miriam Makeba and Brenda Fassie.

== Discography ==
=== Live album ===
Title	Album details	Peak chart positions							Certifications	Sales
Title	Album details	FIMI	GER	GHA	RIAJ	RSA	UK	US	Certifications	Sales
Give and Take Live	Released: 25 October 2013; Label: TMP Entertainment, Sony Entertainment Africa; Format: DVD, digital download	–	—	—	—	—	—	—	RISA: Gold	70,000 units
"—" denotes a recording that did not chart or was not released in that territory.

=== Studio albums ===
Title	Album details	Peak chart positions							Certifications	Sales
Title	Album details	FIMI	GER	GHA	RIAJ	RSA	UK	US	Certifications	Sales
Soulitary	Released: 2004; Label: Columbia Records; Format: CD	–	—	—	—	—	—	—		
Life, Love 'n Music	Released: 1 January 2007; Label: Kalawa Jazmee Records; Format: CD, digital download, vinyl	–	—	—	—	—	—	—		
Ina Ethe	Released: 1 October 2011; Label: TMP Entertainment; Format: CD, digital download, vinyl	–	—	—	—	—	—	—	RISA: 2× platinum	100,000 units
Work of Heart	Released: 11 September 2015; Label: TMP Entertainment, Sony Entertainment Africa; Format: CD, digital download, vinyl	–	—	—	—	—	—	—	RISA: Platinum	
L.O.V.E	Released: 15 June 2018; Label: Sony; Format: CD, digital download, vinyl	–	—	—	—	—	—	—	RISA: Platinum	
Embo	Released: 03 November 2023; Label: Format: Streaming, digital download, vinyl	–	—	—	—	—	1	—		
"—" denotes a recording that did not chart or was not released in that territory.

=== As lead artist ===
List of singles as lead artist, with selected chart positions and certifications, showing year released and album name
Title	Year	Peak chart positions	Certifications	Album
Title	Year	ZA	Certifications	Album
"Crush" (Blaxtar, Zonke)	2010	—		Non-album single
"Say Now"	2013	—		Non-album single
"Ngyazifela" (Emjay sweetcheesy, DJ Shandies, Zonke)	2021	—		Non-album single
"Thando" (Emjay sweetcheesy, Zonke)	2021	—		Non-album single
"Lady"	2021			Embo
"Oko"	2022	1		Non-album single
"Oko (Bass N Beat-Mix)" (Bass N Beat Zonke)	2022	—		Non-album single
"MA Africa"	2024	—		Non-album single
"—" denotes a recording that did not chart or was not released in that territory.

== Television appearance ==
In July 2014, Zonke was announced as one of three celebrities to act as judges in the first episode of the X Factor SA which was broadcast on SABC 1 between September and December 2014.

== Awards and nominations ==
Zonke's contribution to the South African music industry has earned her several awards and nominations in music award events including the South African Music Awards, Metro FM Music Awards, the Channel O Music Video Awards and MTV Africa Music Awards.
