= Amazulu (album) =

Studio album by Amanda Black
- Released: 11 November 2016
- Recorded: October 2016
- Studio: Ambitiouz Studios
- Genre: RnB, afro-soul, soul
- Length: 55:58
- Language: Xhosa; Zulu; English
- Label: Ambitiouz
- Producer: Christer (also exec); Amanda Black; Ruff; Lunatik; Vuyo Manyike; Ron Epidemic

Amanda Black chronology
Amazulu (2016)	Power (2019)

Singles from Amazulu
- 1. "Amazulu" Released: 1 July 2016; 2. "Separate" Released: 7 November 2016; 3. "Kahle" Released: 12 May 2017

Amazulu is the debut studio album of South African singer Amanda Black. It was released on 11 November 2016 through Ambitiouz Entertainment with music production credits from Christer, Ruff, Vuyo Manyike and Lunatik; and additional songwriting credits from Jabulani Makhubo, Christer Kobedi and Sizwe Thabethe. The 14-track album was nominated in five categories each at the 2016 Metro FM Music Awards and at the 23rd edition of the South African Music Awards.

== Commercial performance ==
The album was certified platinum three weeks after its release which led Ngwako Malatji of Sunday World to name Amanda Black as "the new queen of ballads".

== Track listing ==
No.	Title	Writer(s)	Producer(s)	Length
1.	"Amazulu"	Amanda Antony; Christer Kobedi	Christer; Lunatik; Vuyo Manyike	4:13
2.	"Kahle"	Amanda Antony; Jabulani Makhubo	Lunatik	3:31
3.	"Uzobuya"	Amanda Antony; Christer Kobedi; Sizwe Andrew Thabethe	Christer	3:20
4.	"Free"	Amanda Antony	Ron Epidemic	4:24
5.	"Mna Nawe"	Amanda Antony	Christer; Ruff; Vuyo Manyike	3:49
6.	"Kulomhlaba"	Amanda Antony	Christer; Amanda Black	4:31
7.	"Sinazo"	Amanda Antony	Christer	4:42
8.	"Lila"	Amanda Antony; Jabulani Makhubo	Christer; Ruff	3:58
9.	"Buyela Kum"	Amanda Antony	Christer; Vuyo Manyike; Ruff	5:06
10.	"Crush"	Amanda Antony	Lunatik	4:04
11.	"Sabela"	Amanda Antony	Lunatik	3:36
12.	"Msizeni"	Amanda Antony	Christer	3:30
13.	"Separate"	Jabulani Makhubo	Christer	3:15
14.	"Thank You"	Amanda Antony	Vuyo Manyike	3:27
Total length:				55:58

Notes
- "Kahle" - Keyboards by Christer • Bass and Guitars by Vuyo Manyike
- "Uzobuya" - Bass by Elisha Dapo Kehinde
- "Sabela" - Guitars by Vuyo Manyike
- "Thank You" - Additional vocals by Vuyo Manyike

=== Sample credits ===
- "Lila" - Contains sample from "Baby I'm Missing You" by Blondie Makhene

== Personnel ==
Credits for Amazulu are adapted from AllMusic.

- Amanda Antony - Composer
- Amanda Black - Primary Artist
- Christer Kobedi - Composer
- Jabulani Makhubo - Composer
- Karabo Makhene - Composer
- Lesego Kyle Mnyandu - Composer
- Melvin Tities - Composer
- Mfanafuthi Nkosi - Composer
- Mnqobi Nxumalo - Composer
- Ronald Baloyi - Composer
- Ruff Nkosi - Composer
- Sizwe Thabethe - Composer
- Vuyo Manyike - Composer

== Release history ==
List of release dates, showing region, formats, label, editions and reference
Region	Date	Format(s)	Label	Edition(s)	Ref.
Various	11 November 2016	Digital download	Ambitiouz Entertainment	Standard	

== Certifications ==
Region	Certification	Certified units/sales
South Africa (RISA)	Platinum	20,000^{*}
^{*} Sales figures based on certification alone.

== Accolades ==
Year	Awards ceremony	Award description(s)	Results
2016	16th Metro Fm Music Awards	Best African Pop Album	Nominated
2016	16th Metro Fm Music Awards	Best Female Album	Nominated
2016	23rd South African Music Awards	Album of the Year	Won
2016	23rd South African Music Awards	Best R&B/Soul/Reggae Album	Won
