= Power (Amanda Black album) =

Studio album by Amanda Black
- Released: 25 October 2019
- Studio: AfroRockstar Studios
- Genre: R&B, afro-soul, soul
- Length: 67:06
- Language: English; Xhosa; Zulu
- Label: AfroRockstar; Sony Music
- Producer: Christer (also exec); Amanda Black (exec); Colin Gayle (exec); Nandi Mwepu (exec); Loud Haileer; Gemini Major; Vuyo Manyike; Phonikz; Dhapsykord; Victory Chauke; Kenneth Crouch

Amanda Black chronology
Amazulu (2016)	Power (2019)	Mnyama (2021)

Singles from Power
- 1. "Thandwa Ndim" Released: 31 January 2019; 2. "Egoli" Released: 13 September 2019; 3. "Ndizele Wena" Released: 19 February 2019

Power is the second studio album by South African singer-songwriter Amanda Black. It was released on 25 October 2019 through her new formed record label AfroRockstar in joint-venture with Sony Music Entertainment. The album boasts 18 tracks with music production credits from Christer, Gemini Major, Vuyo Manyike, Loud Haileer and more.

Power was nominated for Best Adult Contemporary Album at 2020 South African Music Awards.

== Accolades ==
Year	Nominee / work	Award	Result	Ref.
2020	Power	Best Adult Contemporary Album	Nominated	

== Track listing ==
All tracks are written by Amanda Benedicta Antony

No.	Title	Writer(s)	Producer(s)	Length
1.	"Intro (featuring Kush Mahleka)"	Amanda Antony; Kuhle Mahleka	DG; Christer	2:13
2.	"Baninzi"	Amanda Antony	Christer	3:17
3.	"Hamba"	Amanda Antony	Christer	4:24
4.	"Mmangwane"	Amanda Antony	Christer	3:50
5.	"Bayile"	Amanda Antony	Christer	5:31
6.	"Famous"	Amanda Antony	Christer	3:40
7.	"Ndizele Wena"	Amanda Antony	Christer; Loud Haileer	2:38
8.	"Egoli"	Amanda Antony	Christer; Loud Haileer; Gemini Major	3:05
9.	"Vuka (featuring Anthony Hamilton and Soweto Gospel Choir)"	Amanda Antony	Christer; Victory Chauke; Loud Haileer	4:40
10.	"Afrika (featuring Adekunle Gold)"	Amanda Antony; Adekunle Kosoko; Ndumiso Manana	Christer; Loud Haileer; Dharpsykord	2:49
11.	"High Interlude"	Amanda Antony	Loud Haileer; Christer	0:50
12.	"Love Again"	Amanda Antony	Christer	4:03
13.	"Khumbula (featuring Ami Faku)"	Amanda Antony; Amanda Faku	Christer; Loud Haileer; Phonikz; Vuyo Manyike	4:16
14.	"Phambili"	Amanda Antony	Christer	5:14
15.	"Ndilinde Prelude"		Kenneth Crouch	0:57
16.	"Ndilinde"	Amanda Antony	Christer	5:45
17.	"Thandwa Ndim"	Amanda Antony	Christer	4:35
18.	"Power"	Amanda Antony	Christer	4:47
Total length:				67:06

Notes

- "Baninzi" - Guitars by Phonikz
- "Hamba" - Additional background vocals by Christer; Bass by Earl Breezy & Ishmail Ndlovu
- "Mmangwane" - Additional background vocals by Christer; Guitars by Given Zulu
- "Bayile" - Strings produced, arranged and directed by Kenneth Crouch and Performed by The Muses; Violin by Ashley Bodill & Olivia Kotze, Cello by Neo Buthelez; Strings engineered by George Vardas at CSR Studios, Johannesburg, South Africa
- "Egoli" - Guitars by Given Zulu; Bass Guitar by Jody Willard
- "Vuka" - Choir directed & produced by Milton Ndlakuse; Bass by Ishmail Ndhlovu; Drums by Kearabetswe "K-Beat" Moalusi
- Afrika - Additional background vocals by Manana; Guitars by Given Zulu; Bass Guitar by Andziso; Horns by Adekunle Gold
- "Love Again" - Guitars by Ryno Zeelie; Guitars engineered by Ryno Zeelie at Figure of 8 Studios, Johannesburg, South Africa
- "Phambili" - Additional background vocals by Sjava & Christer
- "Ndilinde" - Piano by Kenneth Crouch
- "Thandwa Ndim" - Bass Guitars by Victory Chauke, Ishmail Ndhlovu & Zwelakhe Masemola; Guitars by Shadrack Fana
- "Power" - Guitars by Phonikz & Andziso, Bass by Ishmail Ndhlovu, Organs by Kenneth Crouch

=== Sample credits ===
- "Hamba" - Contains interpolation from "Hamba Bekhile (We Are Growing)" by Margaret Singana
- "Mmangwane" - Contains interpolation from "The Way Kungakhona" by Bongo Maffin
- "Bayile" - Contains interpolation from "Baile" by Pilani Bubu

== Release history ==
List of release dates, showing region, formats, label, editions and reference
Region	Date	Format(s)	Label	Edition(s)	Ref.
Various	25 October 2019	Digital download	Sony Music	Standard	
