= Work of Heart (Zonke album) =

Studio album by Zonke
- Released: 11 September 2015
- Recorded: 2014–2015
- Genre: Neo soul, afrosoul
- Length: 44:13
- Label: Sony
- Producer: Zonke Dikana

Zonke chronology
Give and Take Live (2013)	Work of Heart (2015)	L.O.V.E (2018)

Singles from Work of Heart
- 1. "Reach it" 2. "Meet Me in My Dreams"

Work of Heart is the self-produced fourth studio album of South African singer, songwriter, and record producer Zonke. Released on 11 September 2015 through Sony Entertainment Africa., it is the follow-up of her gold-certified live album Give and Take Live.

== Background ==
On 23 August 2015, Zonke announced the release date, pre-order link, track listing and cover art of the album. Preceding the album's release were two singles titled "Reach It" and "Meet Me in My Dreams", the later a song she dedicated to her older sister Lulu Dikana. Work of Heart was nominated in two categories at the 15th Metro FM Music Awards and four categories at the 22nd South African Music Awards, winning one.

== Commercial performance ==
On 15 July 2016, the album was certified platinum.

== Critical reception ==
Upon its release, Work of Heart was met to positive critical reviews among local music critics. Lesley Mofokeng of SowetanLIVE gave the overall album production and songs an excellent verdict but however suggested that Zonke should experiment infusing some other genres of music in her upcoming projects. Lebogang Boshomane, a music critic for SowetanLIVE gave the album 3.9 stars out of 5, further stating that, "All in all, it is a good album which will have you tearing up one moment then slowly moving to the beat the next".

== Track listing ==
No.	Title	Length
1.	"Birds of a Feather (Intro)"	1:30
2.	"Dear Child (So Many Ways)"	3:46
3.	"Great Storm"	3:48
4.	"S.O.S (Release Me)"	4:03
5.	"Meet me in my Dreams"	3:34
6.	"Free State of Mind"	3:49
7.	"Reach It"	3:34
8.	"Grateful (Interlude)"	0:59
9.	"This Is It"	3:34
10.	"Heavenly"	3:40
11.	"Funky Lovin' (Stay With Me)"	3:59
12.	"Those Days"	3:50
13.	"Forever in Love"	3:54

== Release history ==
List of release dates, showing region, formats, label, editions and reference
Region	Date	Format(s)	Label	Edition(s)	Ref.
Worldwide	11 September 2015	CD; digital download; Vinyl	Sony	Standard	

== Accolades ==
Year	Award ceremony	Prize	Result	Ref
2016	15th Metro FM Music Awards	Best African Pop Album	Nominated	
2016	15th Metro FM Music Awards	Best Female Album	Nominated	
2016	22nd South African Music Awards	Female Artist of the Year	Won	
2016	22nd South African Music Awards	Best R&B/Soul/Reggae Album	Nominated	
2016	22nd South African Music Awards	Best Produced Album of the Year	Nominated	
2016	22nd South African Music Awards	Best Engineered Album of the Year	Nominated	
