= Life, Love 'n Music =

Studio album by Zonke
- Released: 1 January 2007
- Recorded: 2004–2006
- Genre: Urban pop, house music
- Label: Kalawa Jazmee

Zonke chronology
Soulitary (2004)	Life, Love 'n Music (2007)	Ina Ethe (2011)

Singles from Life, Love 'n Music
- 1. ""Ekhaya""; 2. "Nomanyange"

Life, Love 'n Music is the second studio album of South African singer-songwriter and record producer Zonke. It was released on 1 January 2007 through Kalawa Jazmee Records. Preceding its release were two singles titled "Ekhaya" and "Nomanyange" with the former going on to be nominated in the "Record of the Year" category at the 14th South African Music Awards.

== Track listing ==
No.	Title	Length
1.	"Nomanyange"	4:40
2.	"Ndigoduse"	5:03
3.	"Ekhaya"	5:22
4.	"Anywhere U Go"	4:30
5.	"Malibongwe"	5:05
6.	"Uzondilinda"	5:07
7.	"Pleasure"	5:01
8.	"Never Again"	4:33
9.	"Learn to Love"	5:07
10.	"I Believe"	5:00
11.	"My Music"	6:06
12.	"Bafazi Belali"	5:31
13.	"Phuma Kum"	5:31
14.	"Amanga"	5:18
15.	"Ugagile"	5:22

== Release history ==
List of release dates, showing region, formats, label, editions and reference
Region	Date	Format(s)	Label	Edition(s)	Ref.
Worldwide	1 January 2007	CD; digital download; Vinyl	Kalawa Jazmee	Standard	

== Accolades ==
Year	Award ceremony	Prize	Result	Ref
2008	14th South African Music Awards	Album of the Year	Nominated	
2008	14th South African Music Awards	Best Female Album	Nominated	
2008	14th South African Music Awards	Best Urban Pop Album	Nominated	
