= Mpumi =

Mpumi is a South African given name. Notable people with the name include:

- Mpumi Madisa (born 1980), South African businesswoman
- Mpumi Mpofu, South African Secretary of Defence
- Mpumi Nyandeni (born 1987), South African footballer
- Mpumi Mpama (born 1977), South African Actor
