= Give and Take Live =

Give and Take (Live)

Live album by Zonke
- Released: 25 October 2013
- Recorded: 5 July 2013
- Venue: Lyric Centre, Golden Reef City, Johannesburg
- Genre: Jazz, afrosoul
- Length: 126:06
- Label: TMP; Sony

Zonke chronology
Ina Ethe (2011)	Give and Take (Live) (2013)	Work of Heart (2015)

Give and Take (Live) is a live album by South African singer-songwriter and record producer Zonke. It was recorded on 5 July 2013 at the Lyric Centre, Golden Reef City, Johannesburg and features live performances recorded from 2007 to 2012.

== Commercial reception ==
Give and Take (Live) was certified gold upon selling over 20,000 units sold under two months.

== Track listing ==
No.	Title	Length
1.	"Overture (Live)"	1:15
2.	"Ina Ethe (Live)"	5:36
3.	"My Music (Live)"	6:15
4.	"Thank You for Loving Me (Live)"	5:14
5.	"Say Now (Live)"	6:59
6.	"Nameless (Live)"	5:40
7.	"Sobabini (Live)"	5:21
8.	"Nomanyange (Live)"	6:04
9.	"Ngomso (Live)"	7:44
10.	"Viva the Legend (Live)"	5:38
11.	"Uzohamb'ubuye (Live)"	6:45
12.	"Chivalry is Dead (Live)"	5:28
13.	"When All is Said and Done (Live)"	5:22
14.	"Mzi Ka Phalo (Live)"	5:28
15.	"Feelings (Live)"	8:17
16.	"Nameless (Live)"	5:40
17.	"Malibongwe (Live)"	7:32
18.	"Pleasure (Live)"	7:42
19.	"Jik'Izinto (Live)"	7:13
20.	"Say Now"	5:38

Bonus track
No.	Title	Length
20.	"Say Now"	4:23
Total length:		126:06

== Release history ==
List of release dates, showing region, formats, label, editions and reference
Region	Date	Format(s)	Label	Edition(s)	Ref.
Worldwide	25 October 2013	DVD; digital download	Leely Music; SME Africa	Standard	

== Accolades ==
Year	Award ceremony	Prize	Result	Ref
2014	20th South African Music Awards	Best African Adult Album	Won	
2014	20th South African Music Awards	Best Live DVD	Won	
