= Amanda Black =

South African singer and songwriter (born 1993)

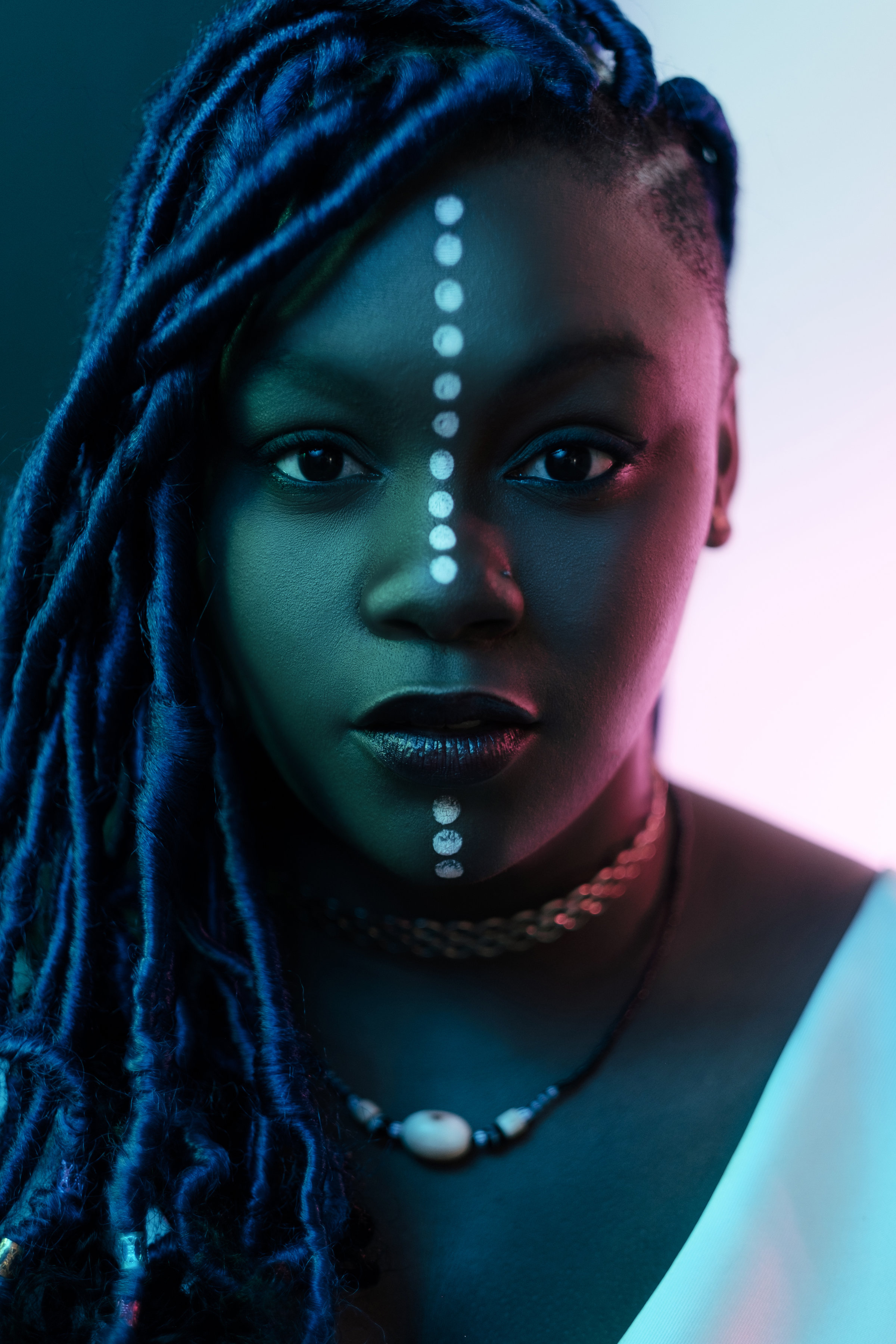
- Black in 2017

Background information
- Born: Amanda Benedicta Antony; 24 July 1993 (age 33); Mthatha, Eastern Cape, South Africa
- Genres: Soul; R&B; Afro-soul
- Occupations: Singer; songwriter
- Years active: 2015–present
- Labels: AfroRockstar; Sony Music

Amanda Benedicta Antony (born 24 July 1993), known professionally as Amanda Black, is a South African singer and songwriter. Born and raised in Gcuwa, her career began in 1999 at the age of 6 singing in church choirs. Amanda was a contestant on Idols South Africa season 11. Black relocated to Johannesburg in 2016 to pursue her music career. She signed a record deal with Ambitiouz Entertainment in 2016 and achieved recognition in the same year following the release of her hit single "Amazulu", which was nominated for several music awards.

Her debut studio album Amazulu (2016), was commercially successful and won "Album of the Year", "Best Newcomer of the Year," "Best Female Artist of the Year" and "Best R&B Soul/Reggae Album". In 2019, she was named the most-streamed artist on Apple Music.

Amanda's third studio album, Mnyama was released in 2021. It was preceded by two singles; "Kutheni Na" and "Let It Go".

== Early life and education ==
Amanda Benedicta Antony is Xhosa. She was born on 24 July 1993 in Mthatha, Eastern Cape, South Africa, and grew up in Butterworth, Eastern Cape, where she spent most of her early life; she also lived in East London. She later moved to Port Elizabeth, where she completed her high school studies at Kabega Christian School, Port Elizabeth, before she proceeded to further her education at Nelson Mandela Metropolitan University, where she studied Music Education.

== Career ==
She started singing at a young age in church and at school until she turned 12, when she began competing in talent hunts which exposed her to stage performance.

=== 2015–2018: Career beginnings and Amazulu ===
The album is about a journey. There are songs in there about me losing and finding myself, my knowing who I am and thriving, songs about heartbreak, love, being happy and comfortable in my skin; and all these are my stories. They are honest.

— Amanda Black, speaking to Amanda Maliba of Independent Online about her debut studio album

She had taken part in three editions of Idols South Africa but became fans' favourite at the Season 11 of the talent show in which she made it to the top 7. In view of pursuing her music career, she moved to Johannesburg in January 2016, where she was approached by Ambitiouz Entertainment, who offered her a recording contract.

On 1 July 2016, she released her first official single, "Amazulu" – a song off her debut studio album, Amazulu. The song received more than 4 million views on YouTube. On 11 November 2016, she released her long anticipated debut album Amazulu through Ambitiouz Entertainment to commercial success and positive critical review. Under a month after its release, the album sold more than 31,000 copies, which led the Recording Industry of South Africa to certify it platinum. It also earned her nominations in five categories both at the 16th edition of the Metro FM Music Awards, and at the 2017 South African Music Awards each. She also got nominated for Viewers Choice: Best International Act at the 2017 edition of the BET Awards.

On 20 July 2018, she released "Kahle", which gained more than a million views on YouTube.

=== 2019–2020: Growth and Power ===
Anthony Hamilton announced in December 2018 that he and Amanda Black were collaborating on music together. On 30 January 2019 Amanda announced that she had signed with Sony Music Entertainment. She later released her single "Thandwa Ndim", which was her first release in two years. The song debuted on Metro FM's Fresh Breakfast Show with DJ Fresh and Somizi Mhlongo and peaked at No. 1 on the local iTunes charts the day of release.

In 2020, She also collaborated with Berita on the single, "Siyathandana" from the album Songs in the Key of Love.

Her album Power won Best Album of the year at South African Afro Music Awards (Saafma).

=== 2021–present: Mnyama, From My Soil To Yours ===
On 4 June 2021, she released a song "Kutheni Na" featuring Kwesta as second single from her album. On 2 July 2021, her third single "Let It Go" was released. Her third studio album Mnyama was released on 6 August 2021.

Her fourth studio album From My Soil To Yours released on 17 November 2023. Production was handled by her long-time producers Christer Kobedi and Vaughan Fourie with three producers Fundile Dlamini, Thato Modika Andziso Ngobeni and Batundi Muisha resulting to genre spanning rnb, afro-pop, and soul. It was supported by two singles "Nguwe", and "Love is for Mahala".

== Artistry ==
=== Musical style ===
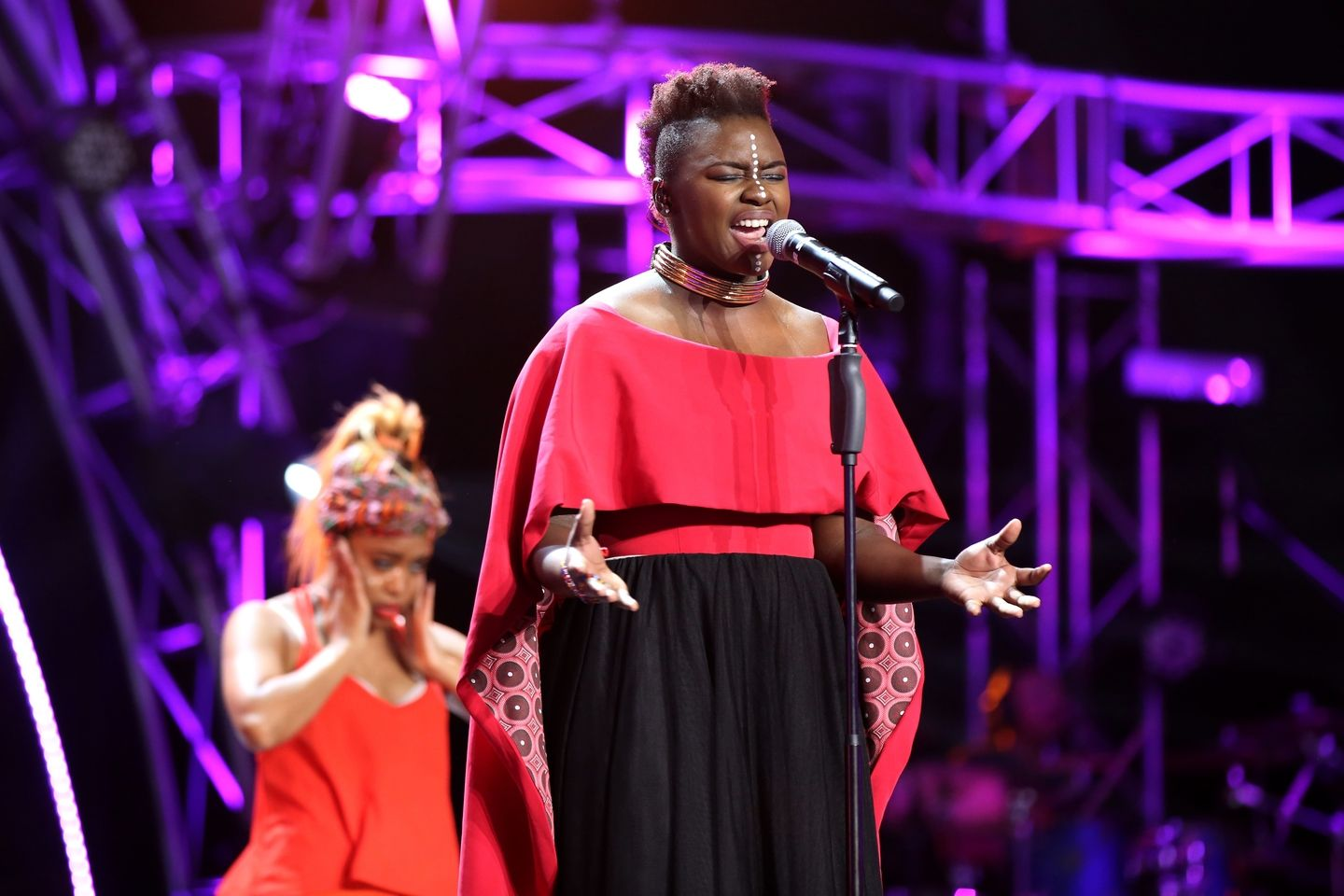
Amanda Black on Idols South Africa 2016

Amanda Black began singing at an early age in church then later continued to sing to her favourite artists, including Beyoncé, Whitney Houston, Brandy Norwood, and Brenda Fassie. She sings in Xhosa and in English. In an interview with Patience Bambalele of The Sowetan, she describes her genre of music as Afro-soul with a fusion of hip-hop and a bit of soul and R&B. On 29 May 2017 the singer appeared in an interview on the SuperSport TV show Homeground—hosted by Minnie Dlamini and Lungile Radu—just a few months after her album Amazulu was released. Alongside her was her music producer Christer Kobedi, who claimed that the album was created and finalised in just over one month. The singer also expressed that the album title song "Amazulu" was, in fact, the first song she had ever written in her home language, Xhosa.

=== Facial art ===
Amanda Black usually adorns her face with Stipples of Xhosa face paint as an expression of how proud she is of her roots. "Xhosa facial art – Xhosa umchokozo – is used to represent Xhosa people. There are different types of patterns, which are created mostly by women. When I was growing up, they were mostly done on special occasions – but in some rural parts of the Eastern Cape, for example, umchokozo is an everyday practise. The Xhosa facial art that I wear on my face has quickly become part of my brand as Amanda Black. But it started as a way of expressing myself and embracing who I am. For me, it's taking back my culture as a Xhosa woman – and feeling beautiful while doing it. It's about me living the way I understand my culture to be. It's a way of representing my roots and where I am from."

Growing up, Amanda did not like the fact that she is dark skinned, she says because TV celebrates light skin and she felt like she was not good enough because she is dark-skinned. She started learning about her roots as a Xhosa woman, her history and origins. Doing this helped her understand who she is and helped her to love herself as an African woman. This also influenced her decision to start painting her face with tribal art, the way she writes, the music she makes and the stories she tells sonically. Amanda started embracing who she is after reading Steve Biko's Black Consciousness.

== Discography ==
- Amazulu (2016)
- Power (2019)
- Mnyama (2021)
- From My Soil To Yours (2023)
