= Emtee =

South African rapper, musical artist & song-writer

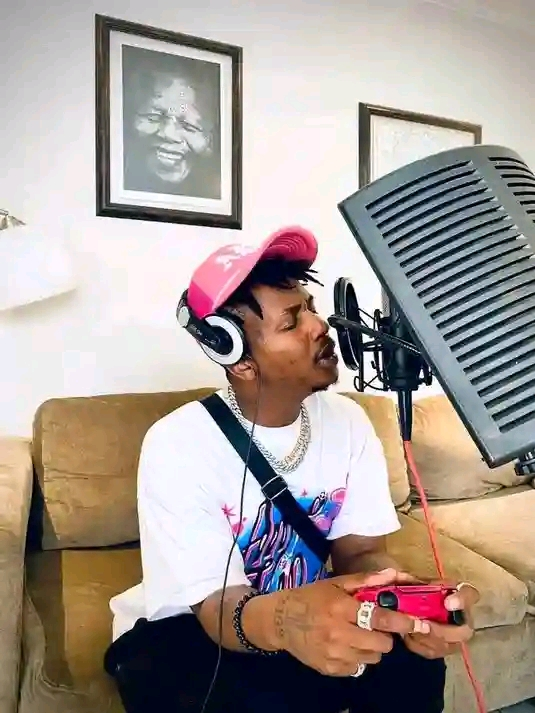

Background information
- Born: Mthembeni Ndevu; 17 September 1992 (age 34); Matatiele, South Africa
- Origin: Soweto, Johannesburg, South Africa
- Genres: African Trap Music (ATM); Hip Hop; trap
- Occupations: Rapper; record producer; singer-songwriter; actor
- Instruments: Vocals, marimba
- Years active: 2010–present
- Labels: Ambitiouz Entertainment; Emtee Records
- Spouse: Nicole Kendall Chinsamy (m. 2019— present)
- Website: www.emtee.co.za

Mthembeni Ndevu, professionally known by his stage name Emtee (stylized as eMTee) is a South African rapper. Regarded as one of the best and most influential figures in the South African music scene. He was born in Matatiele, Eastern Cape and grew up in Rockville, Soweto, where he was involved in talent shows. His career began at the age of 16, and his debut hit single, "Roll Up" was released in 2015. Emtee was signed to Ambitiouz Entertainment, released his debut album Avery (2015), which was commercially successful and was eventually certified platinum by Recording Industry of South Africa (RiSA).

The album was preceded by two successful hit singles: "Roll Up" and "We Up".

His sophomore studio album Manando (2017), was met with critical acclaim the title referring to his late high school friend. His second mixtape DIY 2 was released in 2018 with the lead single titled "Abantu". After departure with his former record label, he then established his own record label Emtee Records in 2019.

eMtee's third studio album Logan (2021), which debuted number 1 in South Africa. The album reflects on overcoming personal struggles. He released his long-anticipated Album DIY 3 on 31 October 2024, which is the third installment of his DIY projects, with the first being DIY 1[DIY I].

== Career ==
=== Early career ===
Emtee kept working on his music throughout his late teen years, opting to not repeat his final year in school, although his pass was not good enough to enter him into the major universities in South Africa.

In 2010, Emtee collaborated with South African rapper Maraza on a song titled "In It To Win It". They appeared on Channel O's show HeadRush. Before his solo career, Emtee was part of the rap trio, African Trap Movement/Music, alongside fellow South African rappers Sjava, Saudi and their producer Ruff before they were all signed by Ambitiouz Entertainment.

=== 2015-2019: Avery ===
In early 2015, a friend of Emtee, his producer Ruff produced the beat for the song that would eventually become his debut single, "Roll Up". Emtee claimed that the entire track was recorded and finalized in two hours. "Roll Up" received major radio play in Southern Africa and peaked at the top of DJ Speedsta's hip hop chart on YFM. Wizkid and South African rapper AKA featured on the official re-release of his single, which eMTee called "Roll Up Re-Up". The late South African rapper AKA was also known to be the person who believed in him and helped nurture his talent when no one else would. In 2023, Emtee stated that AKA is also the reason for his accolades & success. He said that "Roll Up" was recorded within a tight schedule, because he and his team were finalizing his debut album.

At the 22nd South African Music Awards, Emtee received five nominations, winning the awards for Rap Album of The Year for Avery and Song of the Year for "Roll Up". Emtee won his second award for Song of the Year at the 2015 South African Hip Hop Awards, again for "Roll Up". "Roll Up" competed in a category where two South African gold selling artists, as well as Khuli Chana each made at least two appearances.

On December 4, 2015, Emtee's debut album Avery was released on iTunes and to domestic music retailers. eMtee was the third most played South African hip hop artist in the latter part of 2015 (10th most played artist overall).

=== 2018-2020: New label and upcoming music ===
In August 2019, Emtee announced that he was leaving his label Ambitiouz Entertainment, amid controversy. In September 2019, Emtee established his own record label, Emtee Records under his company African Trap Movement. In November, the rapper said he would be releasing a new EP in 2020.
On 21 January 2020, Emtee announced via Twitter the working on his fourth studio album, DIY 3, in 2020. The album will serve as a follow-up to his third album DIY 2. On 8 May 2020, Emtee released a new single, titled "Johustleburg". "Johustleburg" was first teased during Emtee's "hit battle" with fellow rapper Nasty C in April 2020. It marks the third single from Emtee in 2020, following "Wave" and "Brand New Day," which he released earlier in 2020.

=== 2021-present: Logan and DIY 3 ===
In early February 2021, his single "iThemba" was released. The song debuted number one in South Africa.

On April 9, 2021, his fourth studio album Logan was released in South Africa. At the 2021 South African Hip Hop Awards, Logan received a nomination for Album of the Year and was also nominated for artist of the decade which was won by Cassper Nyovest.

== Personal life ==
Emtee has two sons and a daughter with his childhood girlfriend Nicole Chinsamy, who he later married in 2019. His first son, Avery was born in 2015, second son, Logan in 2018 and his daughter Nairobi born in 2023. His debut album was named after Avery. He also named his 2021 Album after his second born Logan .

== Discography ==
=== Studio albums ===
Album title	Album details
Avery	Released: 4 December 2015; Label: Ambitiouz Entertainment; Formats: CD, digital download; Certification: Platinum
Manando	Released: 15 September 2017; Ambitiouz Entertainment; Formats: CD, digital download
DIY 2	Released: 21 September 2018; Label: Ambitiouz Entertainment; Formats: CD, digital download
Logan	Released: 9 April 2021; Label: Emtee Records; Formats: CD, digital download, streaming
DIY 3	Released: 31 October 2024; Label: Emtee Records; Formats: CD, digital download, streaming

=== Extended plays ===
Album title	Album details
DIY	Released: July 2015; Label: DogMow Studios; Formats: CD, digital download

=== Singles ===
- "Roll Up" (2015)
- "Pearl Thusi" (2015)
- "Roll Up (Re-Up)" featuring Wizkid & AKA (2015)
- "Couldn't" (A-Reece featuring Emtee) (2016)
- "My People" (2016)
- "Ngeke" featuring Fifi Cooper (2016)
- "We Up" (2016)
- "Winning" featuring Nasty C (2016)
- "By Any Means" (Stogie T featuring Yanga Chief and Emtee) (2017)
- "Ghetto Hero" (2017)
- "Corner Store" (2017)
- "Plug" (2017)
- "Me and You" featuring Tiwa Savage (2017)
- "Manando" (2017)
- "Thank You" (2017)
- "Abangani" (Sjava featuring Emtee and Saudi) (2018)
- "Lesson" (2018)
- "Abantu" (2018)
- "Wave" (2020)
- "Brand New Day" featuring Lolli (2020)
- "Johustleburg" (2020)
- "Good Time" (2024)
- "Believer" (2024)
- "WAR" (2024)

== Awards and nominations ==
Year	Award Ceremony	Prize	Recipient/Nominated work	Result
2015	South African Hip Hop Awards 2015	Song of The Year	"Roll Up"	Won
2016	Metro FM Music Awards	Best Music Video	"Roll Up"	Won
2016	Metro FM Music Awards	Best Remix	"Roll Up"	Won
2016	Metro FM Music Awards	Best Hip Hop Album	Avery	Won
2016	Metro FM Music Awards	Best New Artist	Himself	Nominated
2016	Metro FM Music Awards	Listeners Choice Award	Himself	Won
2016	22nd South African Music Awards	Album of the Year	Avery	Nominated
2016	22nd South African Music Awards	Male Artist of the Year	Himself	Nominated
2016	22nd South African Music Awards	Newcomer of the Year	Himself	Nominated
2016	22nd South African Music Awards	Best Rap Album	Avery	Won
2016	22nd South African Music Awards	Amstel Record of the Year	"Roll Up"	Won
2016	2016 BET Awards Viewers’ Choice	Best New International Act	Himself	Nominated
2017	AFRIMA Awards	Best male artiste in South Africa	Himself	Nominated
2019	SAMA Awards	Best Hip Hop Album	DIY 2	Nominated
2022	Global Music Awards Africa	Hip Hop artist	Himself	Won
