= Ambitiouz Entertainment =

South African record label

- Official logo
- Parent company: Ambitiouz Group (Pty) Ltd
- Founded: 2015; 11 years ago
- Founder: Kgosi Mahumapelo
- Status: Active
- Distributors: Nyce Entertainment, The Orchards
- Genre: Hip-hop
- Country of origin: South Africa
- Location: Midrand (City of Johannesburg Metropolitan Municipality), South Africa
- Official website: ambitiouzentertainment.com

Ambitiouz Entertainment is a South African independent record label owned and founded by Kgosi Mahumapelo. The label was founded in April 2015 and houses notable acts including Emtee Da Hustler, Sjava and Blaq Diamond.

== History ==
The label was founded in 2014. Its first artists were Emtee, Fifi Cooper and B3nchMarQ.

Fifi Cooper, B3nchMarQ, A-Reece, and Flvme left the label in 2017. The artists claimed that they decided to part ways with the record label due to financial disagreements.

In late 2017, the record label filed a lawsuit against former artist Cooper, banning her from performing any and all songs that she had released while under the label. This caused an uproar from fans and supporters of the artist. The political party EFF stepped in to assist Cooper in the legal battle, which she eventually won.

In 2018, their biggest act at the time, Amanda Black announced that she was going to leave the record label and signed a joint-venture with Sony Music Entertainment. She then proceeded to sue the record label for over 1 million Rand that was owed to her for unpaid performances, which she won. Following Amanda Black's exit were Emtee, Priddy Ugly, Gigi Lamayne, KLY, DJ Citi Lyts, Saudi & NEO. In May 2020, Sjava departed the label.

== Discography ==
=== Studio albums ===
Year	Artist	Album title	Album details	Certification
2025	Emtee	Avery	Released: 4 December 2015; Formats: CD, digital download, streaming	RiSA: 2× Platinum
2016	Sjava	Isina Muva	Released: 22 July 2016; Formats: CD, digital download, streaming	RiSA: Gold
2016	A-Reece	Paradise	Released: 21 October 2016; Formats: CD, digital download, streaming	
2016	Amanda Black	Amazulu	Released: 11 November 2016; Formats: CD, digital download, streaming	RiSA: 3× Platinum
2017	Emtee	Manando	Released: 15 September 2017; Formats: CD, digital download, streaming	
2017	Blaq Diamond	Inqola	Released: 22 November 2017; Formats: CD, digital download, streaming	
2020	Blaq Diamond	Umuthi	Released: 31 January 2020; Formats: digital download, streaming	
2021	Kid Tini	The Second Coming	Released: 18 December 2020; Formats: digital download, streaming	
2021	Cici	Sukulila	Released: 3 September 2021; Formats: digital download, streaming	
2022	Malome Vector	Karabo	Released: 7 January; Formats: digital download, streaming	
2022	Intaba Yase Dubai	Amagama	Released: 23 April 2022; Formats: digital download, streaming	

=== Extended plays ===
Year	Artist	EP Title	EP Details
2016	A-Reece	Cutaways EP	Released: 29 September 2016; Formats: Digital download
2019	Kid Tini	Sound Mind EP	Released: 29 September 2016; Formats: Digital download
