= 15th Metro FM Music Awards =

2016 South African music awards

- Sponsored by: Metro FM
- Date: February 27, 2016
- Location: Inkosi Albert Luthuli International Convention Centre; Durban, KwaZulu-Natal
- Country: South Africa
- Hosted by: Bonang Matheba
- Website: www.metrofm.co.za

Television/radio coverage
- Network: SABC1

The 15th installment of the annual Metro FM Music Awards is an award ceremony in the South African music industry honouring musicians who did exceedingly well in their field throughout 2015. The show first aired on SABC 1 on February 27, 2016.

The winner in each category will receive a R100,000 prize for each category they win. Metro FM is investing in musicians; building wealth and benefiting financially from their trade over and above the artistic recognition that comes with the MMA's coveted statuette. This will be the first installment of the award show to include a new category, namely the Pan-African Category.

Nathi and Sphectacular & DJ Naves led the nominations with five each, followed by Riky Rick and Emtee with four nominations each, and AKA, Fifi Cooper and Black Coffee with three nominations each.

Emtee is the biggest winner of the event, having won in four categories. AKA won three awards, one of which he shares with newcomer Emtee.

== Winners and nominees ==
Below is the full list of nominees. Winners are highlighted green.

Category	Nominee	Work nominated	Result
Best African Pop Album	Nathi	Buyelekhaya	Won
Best African Pop Album	Zahara	Country Girl	Nominated
Best African Pop Album	Zonke	Work of Heart	Nominated
Best African Pop Album	Maleh	You Make My Heart Go	Nominated
Best African Pop Album	Kabomo	Sekusile	Nominated
Best Compilation Album	DJ Fresh	Fresh House Flava 8	Nominated
Best Compilation Album	DJ Kanunu	Soul Meditation 2	Nominated
Best Compilation Album	Various Artists	It's Not a Party Without Us	Nominated
Best Compilation Album	999 music	Summer Ya Di Summer	Won
Best Dance Album	DJ Sphectacula & DJ Naves	Kings of the Weekend	Nominated
Best Dance Album	Black Coffee	Pieces of Me	Nominated
Best Dance Album	Prince Kaybee	Better Days	Won
Best Dance Album	Mobi Dixon	Tribal Soul Special Edition	Nominated
Best Dance Album	Heavy K	Respect The Drumboss 2015	Nominated
Best Female Album	Maleh	You Make My Heart Go	Nominated
Best Female Album	Zonke	Work of Heart	Nominated
Best Female Album	Zahara	Country Girl	Nominated
Best Female Album	Thiwe	Soul Therapy	Nominated
Best Female Album	Fifi Cooper	20FIFI	Won
Best Duo or Group Album	Durban Nyts	Believe	Won
Best Duo or Group Album	Deep Xcape	Pandora's Box	Nominated
Best Duo or Group Album	DJ Sphectacula & DJ Naves	Kings of the Weekend	Nominated
Best Duo or Group Album	Junior Taurus & Lady Zamar	Cotton Candy	Nominated
Best Duo or Group Album	Mi Casa	Home Sweet Home	Nominated
Best Hit Single	AKA featuring Burna Boy, Khuli Chana and Yanga	Baddest	Won
Best Hit Single	L-Tido	Dlala Ka Yona	Nominated
Best Hit Single	Kwesta	Nomayini	Nominated
Best Hit Single	WTF	Nomusa	Nominated
Best Hit Single	Shekinah & Kyle Deutshmann	Back to the Beach	Nominated
Best Music Video	Da L.E.S featuring AKA and Burna Boy	P.A.I.D	Nominated
Best Music Video	Donald	What Goes Around	Nominated
Best Music Video	Emtee	Roll Up	Won
Best Music Video	DJ Sphectacula & DJ Naves	Kings of the Weekend Anthem	Nominated
Best Music Video	Tumi featuring Busiswa	Visa	Nominated
Best Hip Hop Album	Cassper Nyovest	Refiloe	Nominated
Best Hip Hop Album	Riky Rick	Family Values	Nominated
Best Hip Hop Album	Emtee	Avery	Won
Best Hip Hop Album	Fifi Cooper	20Fifi	Nominated
Best Hip Hop Album	Zakwe	Impande	Nominated
Best Urban Jazz Album	Benjamin Jephta	Homecoming	Nominated
Best Urban Jazz Album	Judith Sephuma	One World	Nominated
Best Urban Jazz Album	Mpumi Dlamini	Mpumi Dlamini	Nominated
Best Urban Jazz Album	Nduduzo Makhathini	Listening to the Ground	Nominated
Best Urban Jazz Album	Nomfundo Xaluva	From Now On	Won
Best Kwaito Album	Big Nuz	For The Fans	Nominated
Best Kwaito Album	Durban Nyts	Believe	Nominated
Best Kwaito Album	DJ Bongz	Game Changer	Won
Best Kwaito Album	Kabelo Mabalane	Immortal Vol 3	Nominated
Best Male Album	Nathi	Buyelekhaya	Nominated
Best Male Album	Black Coffee	Pieces of Me	Nominated
Best Male Album	Cassper Nyovest	Refiloe	Won
Best Male Album	Prince Kaybee	Better Days	Nominated
Best Male Album	Riky Rick	Family Values	Nominated
Best New Artist	Nathi	Buyelekhaya	Nominated
Best New Artist	Emtee	Avery	Nominated
Best New Artist	Riky Rick	Family Values	Nominated
Best New Artist	Prince Kaybee	Better Days	Nominated
Best New Artist	Fifi Cooper	20Fifi	Won
Best R&B Single	Zonke	Reach It	Nominated
Best R&B Single	Nathi	Nomvula	Nominated
Best R&B Single	Maleh	Feels So Good	Nominated
Best R&B Single	Cici	Runaway	Won
Best R&B Single	Vincent Bones	My Lady	Nominated
Best Remix	Kelly Khumalo	Asine (Afrikan Soul Remix)	Nominated
Best Remix	DJ Sliqe featuring Riky Rick, Reason, L-Tido, Nadia Nakai, Kwesta and Flabba	Do Like I Do (Remix)	Nominated
Best Remix	Emtee featuring Wizkid and AKA	Roll Up Re-Up	Won
Best Remix	Tresor	Never Let Me Go (Mobi Dixon Remix)	Nominated
Best Remix	AKA featuring Fifi Cooper, Rouge, Moozlie and GiGi Lamayne	Baddest (Remix)	Nominated
Best Urban Gospel Album	Ntokozo Mbambo	Spirit and Life	Nominated
Best Urban Gospel Album	Andile ka Majola	Chapter 7	Nominated
Best Urban Gospel Album	Malusi Mbokazi	Ngisize Nkosi	Nominated
Best Urban Gospel Album	Ayanda Ntazi	Udumo	Nominated
Best Urban Gospel Album	Worship House	True Worship 2015 (Live)	Won
Song of the Year	Black Coffee	We Dance Again	Nominated
Song of the Year	Nathi	Nomvula	Won
Song of the Year	DJ Sphectacula & DJ Naves	Kings of the Weekend Anthem	Nominated
Song of the Year	Durban Nyts	Shumaya	Nominated
Song of the Year	Heavy K	Umoya	Nominated
Song of the Year	DJ Ganyani	Talk to Me	Nominated
Song of the Year	Prince Kaybee	Wajelwa	Nominated
Song of the Year	Riky Rick	Boss Zonke	Nominated
Song of the Year	DJ Shimza	Akulalwa	Nominated
Song of the Year	Prince Kaybee	Better Days	Nominated
Best Collaboration	DJ Sphectacula & DJ Naves: featuring Professor	Kings of the Weekend Anthem	Nominated
Best Collaboration	Heavy K: featuring Professor & Mpumi	Umoya	Nominated
Best Collaboration	Major League DJs: featuring Cassper Nyovest, Riky Rick and OkMalumKoolKat	Slyza Tsotsi	Nominated
Best Collaboration	AKA: featuring Burna Boy, Khuli Chana and Yanga	Baddest	Won
Best Collaboration	DJ Sliqe: featuring JR, OkMalumKoolKat and WTF	iLife	Nominated
Listeners Choice	Emtee		Won
Best Produced Album	Fifi Cooper	20Fifi	Won
Best Styled Video	Cici		Won
Lifetime Achiever	Arthur Mafokate		
