= Son of a gun (disambiguation) =

Son of a gun is an exclamation in American and British English.

Son of a Gun may also refer to:

== Film and television ==
- Son of a Gun, a 1918 film featuring Hugh Fay
- Son of a Gun (film), a 2014 Australian crime film
- "Son of a Gun" (Homicide: Life on the Street), an episode
- "Son of a Gun" (Inspector George Gently), a 2015 TV episode
- "Son of a Gun", an episode of MythBusters
- The Son of a Gunn Show, a New Zealand children's TV show

== Music ==
=== Albums ===
- Son of a Gun (EP) or the title song, by the Vaselines, 1987
- Son of a Gun, an album by Carey Bell, 1984
- Son of a Gun, an EP by Martin Bisi, 2010
- Son of a Gun, a mixtape by Key Glock, 2020

=== Songs ===
- "Son of a Gun (I Betcha Think This Song Is About You)", by Janet Jackson, 2001
- "Son of a Gun" (JX song), 1994
- "Son of a Gun", by Black Oak Arkansas from Street Party, 1974
- "Son of a Gun", by Bruce Dickinson from Tattooed Millionaire, 1990
- "Son Of A Gun", by K.O from Skhanda Republic, 2013
- "Son of a Gun", by BWO from Prototype, 2005
- "Son of a Gun", by Clouddead from Ten, 2004
- "Son of a Gun", by Dead or Alive from Mad, Bad, and Dangerous to Know, 1986
- "Son-Of-A-Gun", by Hoodoo Gurus from Blue Cave, 1996
- "Son of a Gun", by KMFDM from Xtort, 1996
- "Son of a Gun", by the La's from The La's, 1990
- "Son of a Gun", by Mapleoak, fronted by Pete Quaife, 1970
- "Son of a Gun", by Search the City, 2008
- "Son of a Gun", a song by Silver Convention from the album Save Me (1975)

== See also ==
- Sonofabitch stew, euphemistically sonofagun stew, a cowboy dish of the American West
- Sons of Guns, a 2011–2014 American reality television series
- "Sun of a Gun", a song by Oh Land, 2010
