= SR 3 =

SR 3 may refer to:

- SR-3 Vikhr, a Russian assault rifle
- SR-3 Blackstar, the first stage of a reported American covert spaceplane program
- Matich SR3, an Australian sports car
- Radical SR3, an English sports car
- Saints Row: The Third, a video game
- Szekely SR-3, an aircraft engine
- State Road 3 or State Route 3; see List of highways numbered 3
- The third iteration of Solar Roadways' panels, and the first to be publicly installed
- VR Class Sr3, a Finnish electric locomotive
- SR3 (album), an album by K.O
