= Stone Cold Heart =

Studio album by Elaine
- Released: 11 October 2024
- Recorded: 2021–2024
- Studio: Columbia Records, Los Angeles; South Africa
- Genre: R&B; soul
- Label: Colombia Records
- Producer: Charles Nkateko Shilovwa; Elysee Ilunga Mubikay

Elaine chronology
Elements (2019)	Stone Cold Heart (2024)

Singles from Stone Cold Heart
- 1. "Love Me Slowly"; 2. "Loving featuring Blxckie"; 3. "Fake Deep"

Stone Cold Heart is the debut studio album by South African singer Elaine. It was released on 11 October 2024 by Columbia Records. Stone Cold Heart blends elements of R&B, trap soul and neo-soul with inspiration from R&B singers such as Beyoncé and Lauryn Hill. Tirus Thomas and Elyzée Mubikay are credited as producers.

== Track listing ==
No.	Title	Writer(s)	Length
1.	"Lost And Found"	Elaine	4:42
2.	"Love Me Slowly"	Elaine and Charles Nkateko Shilovwa
3.	"Stone Cold"
4.	"Loving" (featuring Blxckie)
5.	"Rumours"
6.	"Know Each Other"
7.	"Lavida Loca"
8.	"My Lover"
9.	"Waiting On You"
10.	"Las Palm Avenue"
11.	"Relapsing"
12.	"Fake Deep"

== Reviews ==
Reviews for Elaine's album "Stone Cold Heart" have been overwhelmingly positive, with many praising her emotional depth and versatility. One review noted that the album is a "well-crafted masterpiece that highlights Elaine's growth as an artist and solidifies her place as one of the brightest stars in R&B"

The album's ability to balance different genres, from R&B to Afrobeats and rock, has also been praised. Reviewers have noted that Elaine's experimentation with different sounds pays off, creating a unique and captivating listening experience

Lyrically, the album has been praised for its honesty and vulnerability, with Elaine tackling themes of love, heartbreak, and self-discovery. One reviewer noted that Elaine's songwriting is "unparalleled" and that she has a "unique ability to capture raw emotion"

Some standout tracks from the album include "Broken Hearted Ass Bitch", "La Vida Loca", and "Stone Cold", which have been praised for their production, lyrics, and emotional delivery ² ³.

Overall, "Stone Cold Heart" has been praised as a cohesive and impactful album that showcases Elaine's artistry and growth as a musician.

== Awards and nominations ==
Awards and nominations for Stone Cold Heart
Year	Ceremony	Category	Result	Ref.
2025	South African Music Awards	Best R&B/Soul Album	Won	
