= Elements (Elaine EP) =

EP by Elaine
- Released: 29 September 2019
- Genre: R&B
- Length: 21:35
- Label: Elaine Music; Columbia Records
- Producer: Clxrity; Elizée; Elaine (also exec.)

Elaine chronology
Elements (2019)	Stone Cold Heart (2024)

Elements is the debut extended play by South African singer and songwriter Elaine. It was self-released on 29 September 2019. It was certified Platinum by the Recording Industry of South Africa (RiSA).

Elements was nominated for Best R&B/Soul Album at the 2020 South African Music Awards.

== Track listing ==
Elements track listing
No.	Title	Writer(s)	Producer(s)	Length
1.	"Say It"	Elaine Mukheli; Elyzée Ilunga Mubikay	Elyzée	2:42
2.	"When We're Alone"	Mukheli; Mubikay	Elyzée	2:32
3.	"I/You"	Mukheli; Charles Nkateko Shilowa	clxrity	3:17
4.	"You're the One"	Mukheli; Shilowa	clxrity	3:20
5.	"Changes"	Mukheli; Mubikay	Elyzée	3:26
6.	"I Just Wanna Know"	Mukheli; Mubikay	Elyzée; Elaine	3:14
7.	"Risky"	Mukheli; Shilowa	clxrity	3:02
Total length:				21:35

== Personnel ==
All credits adapted from discogs.

- Clxrity - producer (tracks: 3 , 4, 7)
- Elizée - producer (tracks: 1, 2, 5, 6)
- Elaine - writer, vocals, executive producer

== Certifications ==
Region	Certification	Certified units/sales
South Africa (RISA)	Platinum	20,000^{‡}
^{‡} Sales+streaming figures based on certification alone.
