= Sete (song) =

2022 song by K.O

Single by K.O featuring Young Stunna, Blxckie

from the album SR3
- Released: 19 August 2022
- Recorded: 2022
- Length: 4:10
- Label: Skhanda World; Sony Music
- Songwriters: Ntokozo Mdluli; Sandile Msimango; Sihle Sithole
- Producer: Lunatik

K.O singles chronology
| "Playback" | "Sete" (2022) | "Thatha" (2023) |

Young Stunna singles chronology
| "Adiwele" (2021) | "Sete" (2022) | "uNonkosi" (2023) |

Blxckie singles chronology
| "Ye ×4" (2021) | "Sete" (2022) |

"Sete" (stylized in all caps) is a single by South African rapper K.O featuring Young Stunna and Blxckie released on 19 August 2022 through Skhanda World and Sony, off SR3 (2022), as album's lead single. It was written by Ntokozo Mdluli, Sandile Msimango, Sihle Sithole.

The song debuted at number one and has been certified Multi-Platinum by the Recording Industry of South Africa (RiSA).

== Commercial performance ==
"Sete" was certified gold in South Africa 5 days after its initial release and became the fastest surpassed 1 million streams on Spotify in South Africa. It peaked number 1 on Top 5 Spotify Charts. It also peaked number one on Radio Monitor Charts for 9 consecutive weeks.

The song reached platinum on 14 September 2022, sixteen days after release and double platinum on September 27.

== Accolades ==
The song won three awards includes Best Video, Song of the Year and Best Collaboration at the 2022 South African Hip Hop Awards. At 2023 Metro FM Awards "Sete" received 5 nominations includes Artist of the Year, Best Collaboration, Best Music Video, Song of the Year, Best Viral Challenge & Artist of the Year. In addition, "Sete" received nomination for Song of the Year at 2023 Trace Awards. At the 29th South African Music Awards, "SETE" earned 4 nomination for Best Collaboration, Best Produced Music Video, Remix of the Year and Song of the Year.

| Year | Nominee / work | Award | Result |
|---|---|---|---|
| 2022 | "SETE" featuring Young Stunna and Blxckie | Song of the Year | Won |
| 2022 | "SETE" featuring Young Stunna and Blxckie | Best Collaboration | Won |
| 2022 | "SETE" featuring Young Stunna and Blxckie | Best Video | Won |
| 2023 | "SETE" featuring Young Stunna and Blxckie | Best Collaboration | Nominated |
| 2023 | "SETE" featuring Young Stunna and Blxckie | Song of the Year | Nominated |
| 2023 | "SETE" featuring Young Stunna and Blxckie | Best Viral Challenge | Nominated |
| 2023 | "SETE" featuring Young Stunna and Blxckie | Artist of the Year | Nominated |
| 2023 | "SETE" featuring Young Stunna and Blxckie | Best Music Video | Nominated |
| 2023 | "SETE" featuring Young Stunna and Blxckie | Song of the Year | Nominated |
| 2023 | "SETE" featuring Young Stunna and Blxckie | Best Collaboration | Nominated |
| 2023 | "SETE" featuring Young Stunna and Blxckie | Best Produced Music Video | Nominated |
| 2023 | "SETE" featuring Young Stunna and Blxckie | CAPASSO Most Streamed Song | Won |
| 2023 | "SETE" featuring Young Stunna and Blxckie | SAMRO Highest AirPlay Composer | Won |
| 2023 | "SETE" (featuring Young Stunna, Oxlade and Diamond Platnumz) | Remix of the Year | Nominated |

== Remix ==
"Sete"

Remix by K.O, Young Stunna, Blxckie, Diamond Platnumz and Oxlade
- Released: 24 March 2023
- Recorded: 2022
- Length: 4:15
- Label: Sony; Skhanda Republic

Blxckie chronology
| Ye ×4 (2021) | Ke Sete (2023) |

"Sete" remix by K.O, Young Stunna, Blxckie, Diamond Platnumz and Oxlade, released on March 24, 2023 by Sony & Skhanda Republic.

== Charts ==
Chart performance for "SETE"
| Chart (2022) | Peak position |
|---|---|
| South Africa (RiSA) | 1 |

== Certifications ==
| Region | Certification | Certified units/sales |
|---|---|---|
| South Africa (RISA) | 3× Platinum | 60,000^{‡} |
^{‡} Sales+streaming figures based on certification alone.

== Release history ==
Release history and formats for "Sete"
| Region | Date | Format | Version | Label | Ref. |
|---|---|---|---|---|---|
| South Africa | 19 August 2022 | Digital download; streaming | Original | Skhanda World; SME | |
