= TNS (DJ) =

South African DJ

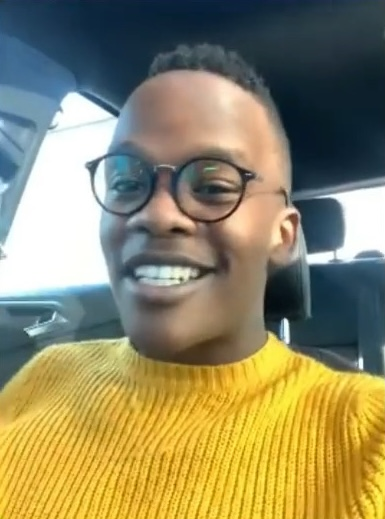
- TNS in 2020

Background information
- Born: Nkazimulo Ngema; July 2000 (age 25)
- Origin: Durban
- Genres: House
- Occupations: Singer; music producer; DJ
- Years active: 2018–present
- Labels: Sony; TNS Music

TNS (born Nkazimulo Ngema; July 2000) is a South African DJ and music producer.

== Early life ==
Born and raised in KwaZulu-Natal, his career in music began at the age of 12, he rose to fame after his collaborations on "Club Controller" and "Banomoya". Nkazimulo Ngema was born in Mandeni, during his childhood at the age of 8, he was involved in church choirs activities.

== Career ==
=== Beginnings and breakthrough ===
In 2010, Ngema relocated to Durban, his musical career began in early 2012 at the age of 12 as music producer. In January 2018, Ngema was featured on "Club Controller" a single by South African DJ's Prince Kaybee and LaSoulMates.

His breakthrough single "My dali" featuring Indlovukazi was released on January 25, 2019. The song was certified 3× platinum in South Africa. That same month, TNS also announced his single "Umona" featuring South African singer Mpumi. The song was released on July 26, 2019. In 2019, he signed a record deal with Sony Music, and released his debut studio album Madlokovu King of African House on September 20, 2019. Having signed a record deal with Sony, his debut studio album Madlokovu King of African House (2019), spawned with chart-topping singles "My Dali" and "Umona".

=== 2021–present: Phupholethu ===
On December 11, 2020, his single "Zodwa Wabantu" featuring Zodwa Wabantu and Luqua was released and album's pre-add were made available. His second studio album Phupholethu was released on March 6, 2021. The song "Sikelela" with Kasango featuring South African singer Bukeka was released on January 28, 2022, and its music video. "Summer Banger" featuring Sino Msolo, Mpumi, Da Musiqal Chef, Malumnator, and De Mthuda was released on 27 October 2022. On November 18, 2022, his Extended Play King of African House was released.

== Discography ==
- Madlokovu King of African House (2019)
- Phupholethu (2021)
- King of African House (2022)
- Warriors of Afro (with Blaq Rhythm) (2024)
- Submerged (2024)

=== Singles ===
==== As lead artist ====
List of singles as lead artist, with selected chart positions and certifications, showing year released and album name
Title	Year	Peak chart positions	Certifications	Album
Title	Year	ZA	Certifications	Album
"Bath' uThwele" (TNS, Funky Qla)	2024	—		Non-album single
"—" denotes a recording that did not chart or was not released in that territory.
