= Elaine (singer) =

South African R&B Singer

- Born: Ndivhuwo Elaine Mukheli; 2 April 1999 (age 27); Pretoria, South Africa
- Origin: Limpopo, South Africa
- Genre: R&B
- Occupations: singer; songwriter
- Instrument: Vocals
- Years active: 2019–present

Ndivhuwo Elaine Mukheli (born 2 April 1999), known mononymously as Elaine, is a South African R&B singer and songwriter from Pretoria. While studying law at the University of the Witwatersrand, she self-released her debut EP Elements in September 2019. The EP reached No. 1 on both the national iTunes and Apple Music album charts, making her the first independent female artist to do so. Elements was certified Platinum by the Recording Industry of South Africa (RiSA) a year after its initial release, and in 2020 it was nominated for Best R&B/Soul Album at the South African Music Awards. Elaine was subsequently signed to Columbia Records in December 2020.

== Early life ==
=== 1999–2018: early years ===
I remember the owner of the pre-school came to me and gave me a solo – this solo was ‘Silent Night’ and girl, that’s when my career took off. This was my time to shine, and I think from the moment I sang that solo, I knew that this is what I want to do for the rest of my life.

— Elaine on her childhood introduction to singing

Elaine was born in Pretoria on 2 April 1999. She started singing at age six and participated in the school choir and various talent competitions while growing up. In 2014 she received a gold medal at the 8th World Choir Games in Riga, Latvia. While attending high school, Mukheli began writing her own music. She began studying law at University of the Witwatersrand in approximately 2018, and stated in November 2019 that she was part of the university's Golden Key Honour Society.

== Career ==
=== 2019-20: Elements ===
Elaine uploaded her debut single, "Slip Away" onto SoundCloud in February 2019, before officially self-releasing it in April 2019. Her follow-up single, "I Just Wanna Know" was released in August 2019. Elaine was the first South African artist to be part of Spotify's Radar artist program alongside Taiylor Manson . She released her debut EP, Elements, on 29 September 2019. The 7-track EP was produced by Clxrity alongside Elizee from South African hip-hop duo Elizee and Malachi and was described by OkayAfrica as "a mellow blend of trap-soul and R&B with incisive explorations of adolescent love." The EP was successful on streaming charts, helping Elaine clock one million accumulative streams within two weeks of its initial release. She was deemed as Apple Music's New Artist Spotlight after Elements reached No. 1 on the album chart in South Africa. At one point in February 2020, all seven songs from Elements simultaneously placed in the top 10 of the national Apple Music R&B/Soul songs chart.

The EP, spawned the single "You're The One", which also topped both iTunes and Apple Music single charts. The single earned Elaine both her radio debut and first number one on the Metro FM Top 40, as well as several weeks atop both the 947 Top 40, and KFM Top 40. Her debut music video for "You're The One" was released in early April 2020 and gained approximately 100 thousand views within 24 hours of its initial release. As of late April 2020, Elaine continues to "dominate" South African music charts. Elements, along with every song on the project were certified Platinum by the Recording Industry of South Africa (RiSA) in July 2020. The EP was also nominated for Best R&B/Soul Album at the 26th South African Music Awards. Elaine was signed to Columbia Records in August 2020.

In November 2020, she was nominated for Best Female Southern Africa at 2020 African Muzik Magazine Awards.

Elaine was announced as Most streamed South African women in South Africa by Spotify at position number 1 in December 2020.

=== 2021-present: Singles and debut album Stone Cold Heart ===
In May 2021, Elaine released her single "Right Now". A year later, on March 24, 2022, the single "Shine" was released, which she first teased the song on TikTok and Instagram. In September 2022, Elaine had released the single, "Deja Vu".

In early October 2022, Elaine was announced as Spotify's EQUAL Africa artist for October.

The single "Loving" with rapper Blxckie was released on March 17, 2023. The song was certified Gold by the Recording Industry of South Africa (RISA).

On August 2, 2024, Elaine released the single "Waiting on You", which served as the lead single for her debut album Stone Cold Heart. The album was released on October 11, and within the same month, leading up to the album's release, Elaine was also announced as an EQUAL Artist Ambassador by Spotify.

== Artistry ==
Elaine's musical style regarding genre has been described as trap-soul (a blend of trap and soul music), alternative R&B, contemporary R&B, and neo-soul. She has cited R&B singers such as Lauryn Hill and Beyoncé as her biggest inspirations. Elaine's musical style has been compared to that of Tsakani Mhinga and H.E.R., as well as Jhené Aiko and Summer Walker.

== Discography ==
=== Studio albums ===
Title	Details	Certifications
Stone Cold Heart	Released: 11 October 2024; Label: Columbia Records; Format: Digital download, streaming	

=== Extended plays ===
Title	Details	Certifications
Elements	Released: 29 September 2019; Label: Self-Released; Format: Digital download, streaming	RISA: Platinum

=== Singles ===
Title	Year	Certification	Album
"Slip Away"	2019	—	Non-album single
"I Just Wanna Know"	2019	RiSA: Platinum	Elements EP
"Say It"	2019	RiSA: 3×Platinum	Elements EP
"When We’re Alone"	2019	RiSA: Platinum	Elements EP
"I/You"	2019	RISA: 2× Platinum	Elements EP
"Changes"	2019	RiSA: 3× Platinum	Elements EP
"You're the One"	2020	RISA: 7× Platinum	Elements EP
"Risky"	2020	RiSA: 3× Platinum	Elements EP
"Right Now"	2021	—	Non-album single
"Fading Away"	2022		Non-album single
"DeJa Vu"	2022		Non-album single
"Shine"	2022		Non-album single
"Loving You" (with Blxckie)	2023	RiSA: Gold	Stone Cold Heart
"Waiting on You"	2024		Stone Cold Heart
"Love Me Slowly"	2024		Stone Cold Heart

== Awards and nominations ==
Award	Year	Recipient(s) and nominee(s)	Category	Result	Ref.
South African Music Awards	2020	Elements	R&B/Soul Album of the Year	Nominated	
African Muzik Magazine Awards	2020	Herself	Best Female Southern Africa	Nominated	
BET Awards	2021	Herself	Best New International Act	Nominated	
MTV Africa Music Awards	2021	Herself	Best Breakthrough Act	Cancelled	
African Muzik Magazine Awards	2021	Herself	Best Female Southern Africa	Won	
Headies	2022	Herself	Best Southern African Artiste Of The Year	Nominated	
Metro FM Music Awards	2025	"Love Me Slowly"	Best R&B Song	Nominated	
