= 26th Annual South African Music Awards =

2020 award ceremony

26th South African
- Date: August 3–7, 2020
- Location: Virtual event, multiple venues
- Country: South Africa
- Hosted by: Dineo Langa; Donovan Goliath
- Most nominations: Prince Kaybee & Sha Sha (5 each)

Television/radio coverage
- Network: Mzansi Magic

The 26th Annual South African Music Awards were held on 3–7 August 2020. Unlike previous years shows, the ceremony was broadcast as a five-night event, with the first four episodes being 30 minutes long, while the fifth one was a 45-minute grand finale. It was held virtually due to the effects of COVID-19 lockdowns, and for the first time, the award show was to be broadcast live on Multichoice's Mzansi Magic Channel (the award show was originally broadcast on SABC 1, but due to the channel's financial problems it was cancelled, then it was picked up by Multichoice). This was the first year the show was broadcast live via My Muze by Vodacom.

The award show was originally scheduled to take place on 2 June, in Sun City Arena, North West and was to air live. The nominees were announced on July 9, 2020.

== Winners and nominees ==
Nominees are as listed below. Winners are in bold.

| Record Of The Year (fan-voted) | Album of the Year | Female Artist of the Year | Male Artist of the Year |
|---|---|---|---|
| **Blaq Diamond - Ibhanoyi**; Semi Tee - Labantwana Ama Uber feat. Miano & Dee; Black Motion - Joy Joy feat. Brenden Praise; TNS - My Dali feat. Indlovukazi; Kay Gee DaKing & Bizizi - Kokota Feat. killer Kau; Black Coffee - Lalala feat. Usher; AKA - Jika feat. Yanga; Tshego - No Ties feat. King Monada; Tresor - Sondela feat. Msaki; De Mthuda & Njelic - Shesha; Holly Rey - You; Tellaman - Whipped feat. Nasty C & Shekinah; DJ Zinhle - Umlilo feat. Mvzzle & Rethabile; Lady Zamar - This is love; K.O - Supa Dupa; Prince Kaybee - Gugulethu feat. Afro Brotherz, Indlovukazi & Supho; Samthing Soweto - Akulaleki feat. Sha Sha, DJ Maphorisa & Kabza De Small; Nasty C - SMA feat. Rowlene; Prince Kaybee - Fetch your life feat. Msaki | **Scorpion Kings - DJ Maphorisa, Kabza De Small, MFR Souls & Virgo Deep**; Re Mmino – Prince Kaybee; Isphithiphithi – Samthing Soweto; Season, Volume II – We Will Worship; Bongo Riot Di Dancehall Wakanda – Trust Stories; Amanzi Nemifula: Umkhuleko – Sibusiso Mash Mashiloane | **Ami Faku – Imali**; Riana Nel – Sterker; Lady Zamar – Monarch; Manu Grace – June; Spha Mdlalose – Indlel’eyekhaya | **Prince Kaybee – Re Mmino**; Benjamin Dube – Glory in His Presence; Samthing Soweto – Isiphithiphithi; Sibusiso Mash Mashiloane – Amanzi Nemifula: Umkhuleko; Bongo Riot Di Dancehall Wakanda – True Stories |
| Newcomer of the Year | Duo/Group of the Year | Best Rock Album | Best Pop Album |
| **Ndabo Zulu & Umgidi Ensemble – Queen Nandi : The African**; Sbu Noah – A David Kind of Psalm (Live); Ami Faku – Imali; Spha Mdlalose – Indlel’eyekhaya; Symphony Viwe Mkizwana -Tributes | **Ndabo Zulu & Umgidi Ensemble – Queen Nandi: The African Symphony**; Malumz on Decks – Find Your Way; Worship House – Project 17 (Live at Carnival City); We Will Worship – Seasons, Volume II; Qadasi & Maqhinga – Ungabanaka | **Dagdrome in Suburbia – Francois Van Coke**; Until The Last Prayer – Gunshot Blue; The Bright Blue Orchids – The Plastics; Sins of the Father – Black Pistol; Plastic Kids – The Tazers | **Ghost – Matthew Mole**; DEEP BREATH – Deep Breath; Here I Am – Christian Heath; Lifeline – Josh Wantie; Solitude – Mike Stent |
| Best Pop Album | Best Afro Pop Album | Best R&B/Soul Album | Best Adult Contemporary Album |
| **Partytjiedier – Kurt Darren**; Elektrisiteit – Dewald Wasserfall; Hou Vas – HANCO; Patriot – Appel; Swaeltjies – Danny Smoke | **Isiphithiphithi – Samthing Soweto**; From Bongo With Love – Bongo Maffin; Imali – Ami Faku; Selimathunzi – Mthunzi; Umuthi – Blaq Diamond | **My Heart to Your Soul – Lungisa Xhamela**; Elements – Elaine; God Decides – Tellaman; Pink Panther – Tshego; Promised Land – Yanga Sobetwa | **Africa – Ndlovu Youth Choir**; Swansong – Lance James; Something Old, Something New, Something Borrowed, Something Blue – The Parlotones; Power – Amanda Black; In a Different Light – Wouter Kellerman |
| Best Classical Album | Beste Kontemporere Musiek Album | Best Hip Hop Album | Best Reggae Album |
| **Music of Spain III – James Grace**; Vignettes for Violin – Kristel Birkholtz; Die Tale Van My Hart – Wilhelm Lichtenburg; Freehand – Charl du Plessis Andaluza; Africa Celebrates – University of Limpopo Choristers (and the KwaZulu-Natal Philharmonic Orchestra) | **Sterker – Riana Nel**; Coenie 2.2 – Coenie de Villiers; Boomhuis – Elandré; Jou Huis – Elvis Blue; Pure Plaas – Ricus Nel | **Becoming a Pop Star – Yanga Chief**; 3T – YoungstaCPT; Injayam Vol.2 – DJ Sliqe; PTYunLTD – KO; Ungqongqoshe Wongqongqoshe – Big Zulu | **True Stories - Bongo Riot Di Dancehall Wakanda**; From the Low Land - Skeleton Blazer; Impilo Kantanga - Jeremiah Fyah Ises; The Revealer - Botanist; Vision 2020 - Fruitystar |
| Remix of the Year | Best Collaboration | Best Dance Album | Best Kwaito/Gqom/Amapiano |
| **Shay’inumber (Deep Sen) - Oscar Nyathi**; Utatakho Remix - Yanga Chief (featuring Boity, Dee Koalaand Riky Rick); Sad To Think (Fka Mash Glitch Dub) - Sculptured Music; Culture Vulture (Remix) - 25K; When Jazz Meets House (The Squad Remix) - DJ General Slam (featuring Bruno Soares Sax) | **Say U Will - KO (featuring Nandi Madida)**; Akulaleki - Samthing Soweto (featuring Sha Sha, DJ Maphorisa and Kabza De Small); Fetch Your Life - Prince Kaybee (featuring Msaki); Love You Tonight - MFR Souls (featuring DJ Maphorisa, Sha Sha and Kabza De Small); Tender Love - Sha Sha (featuring DJ Maphorisa and Kabza De Small) | **Re Mmino - Prince Kaybee**; Akhiwe - Oskido; Find Your Way - Malumz on Decks; Monarch - Lady Zamar; Vibez - DJ Mshega | **Ikhenani - DJ Tira**; Baby Boy III - Vigro Deep; Scorpion Kings - DJ Maphorisa (& Kabza De Small); The Beginning - MFR Souls; The Return of the Scorpion Kings - Kabza De Small (& DJ Maphorisa) |
| Best Live Audio Visual Recording | Best Alternative Music Album | Best African Indigenous Faith | Best Traditional Faith Music Album |
| **Glory in His Presence - Benjamin Dube**; A David Kind of Psalm (Live) - Sbu Noah; Calvary - Dumi Mkokstad; Krone 6 Live - Krone Various Artists; Your Word Alibuyi Lilambatha - Kholeka | **Cult Pop - Lo-Ghost**; Zeno - Muzi; The Calling - James Deacon; Ndim Nani - Zu.; June - Manu Grace | **Folklore: Chapter 1 - Pilani Bubu**; Toro ka Mmino - T.S; S.G 2.0 - Tlale Makhene and Ziyawa Ka Zitha; Power of Dreams - Judith Sephuma; I Write What I Dream - Ntsika | **Calvary - Dumi Mkokstad**; Re-Birth - TYGC Family; Psalm 103 - Jeffrey Mkansi; Praise & Repentance 2nd Offering - Muzie B; OkaJehova Akanqotshwa - Deborah Fraser |
| Best Contemporary Faith Music Album | Best Maskandi Album | Rest of Africa Artist | Best Traditional Album |
| **Glory in His Presence - Benjamin Dube**; A David Kind of Psalm (Live) - Sbu Noah; Friends in Praise, Vol.2 - Neyi Zimu and Omega Khunou; Project 17 Live at Carnival City -Worship House; Seasons, Volume II - We Will Worship | **Upopayi - Thokozani Langa**; Bawucisha ngo Paraffin - Abafana baka Mgqumeni; Hlanga Lomhlabathi - Izingane Zoma; Inhloko Nes’Xhanti - Khuzani; Inyoka Yodumo - Sgwebo Sentambo | **A Good Time - Davido** (Nigeria); Blossom - Sha Sha (Zimbabwe); I Love Girls With Trobul - Sarz and WurlD (Nigeria); Metamorfose - Isabel Novella (Mozambique); YPSZN2 - PsychoYP (Nigeria) | **Ungabanaki - Qadasi & Maqhinga**; Botshelo - Makopanela Pineng; Richang - Tswelelang Cultural Dancers; Sialala - Vha Venda Cultural Group; Tshimo Ea Tlholwa - Mma Ausi |
| Best Engineered Album | Best Produced Music Video | | |
| **Into Dust/Waltz for Jozi - Peter Auret**; I Write What I Dream - Robin Walsh; Isiphithiphithi - Samthing Soweto, Pete Maher and Mas Musiq; Promised Land - Kurt Michael; The Return of the Scorpion Kings - Mas Musiq | **Uncle Scroooch - Fetch Your Life (Prince Kaybee)**; Akulaleki - Yolanda Hlakula and Paul Ramaema; Whipped - Kyle White; SMA - Kyle White; Pearls to Swine - Msaki (featuring Tresor & Kid X) | | |

Best Produced Music Video DJ Maphorisa, MFR Souls, Vigro Deep & Kabza De Small - Scorpion Kings

Music Video of the Year K.O - Supa Dupa Nasty C - SMA Prince Kaybee - Fetch your life Simmy - Umahlalela Tellaman - Whipped TNS - My Dali Prince Kaybee - Gugulethu Kwesta - Khethile Khethile Black Motion - Joy Joy Holly Rey - You AKA - Jika K.O - Say U Will Mobi Dixon - Abantu DJ Maphorisa & Kabza De Small - Koko TLT - Mai Zuzu Lady Zamar - This Is Love DJ Sumbody - Ngwana Daddy Zero12Finest - Baby Are You Coming? MFR Souls - Love You Tonight DJ Zinhle - Umlilo

== Special awards ==
=== International Achievement Award ===
- Ndlovu Youth Choir

=== Lifetime Achievement Award ===
- Dan Tshanda
- Benjamin Dube

Music Video of the Year AKA featuring Yanga Chief - Jika
