= Rands and Nairas =

Song by Emmy Gee

Single by Emmy Gee featuring AB Crazy and DJ Dimplez
- Released: October 28, 2013
- Recorded: 2013
- Genre: Hip hop
- Length: 4:21
- Label: TeamTalkLess
- Songwriters: Emmanuel Nwankwo; Tumelo Dibakwane; Tumi Mooi
- Producer: Vybe Beatz

Emmy Gee singles chronology
"Rands and Nairas" (2013)	"Rands and Nairas (Remix)" (2014)

"Rands and Nairas" is a song by Nigerian recording artist Emmy Gee featuring AB Crazy and DJ Dimplez. The song was produced by American producer Christian "Vybe Beatz" Arceo. It peaked at number 7 on South Africa's official music chart.

== Accolades ==
"Rands and Nairas" won the Best Music Video of the Year award at the 2014 Nigeria Entertainment Awards. The music video for "Rands and Nairas" was nominated for Most Gifted Newcomer and Most Gifted Video of the Year at the 2014 Channel O Music Video Awards.

Year	Awards ceremony	Award description(s)	Results
2014	Channel O Music Video Awards	Most Gifted Newcomer	Nominated
2014	Channel O Music Video Awards	Most Gifted Video of the Year	Nominated
2014	Nigeria Entertainment Awards	Best Music Video of the Year (Artist & Director)	Won

== Charts ==
=== Weekly charts ===
Chart (2013)	Peak position
South Africa (EMA)	7

== Release history ==
Country	Date	Format	Label
Nigeria	October 30, 2013	Digital download	TeamTalkLess

== Rands and Nairas (Remix) ==
"Rands and Nairas (Remix)"

Single by Emmy Gee featuring Ice Prince, Phyno, AB Crazy, Anatii, Cassper Nyovest and DJ Dimplez
- Released: July 14, 2014
- Recorded: 2013
- Genre: Hip hop
- Length: 4:55
- Label: TeamTalkLess
- Songwriters: Emmanuel Nwankwo; Tumelo Dibakwane; Panshak Zamani; Azubuike Chibuzo Nelson; Anathi Mnyango; Refiloe Maele Phoolo; Tumi Mooi
- Producers: Vybe Beatz; Shizzi

Emmy Gee singles chronology
"Rands and Nairas" (2013)	"Rands and Nairas (Remix)" (2014)

"Rands and Nairas (Remix)" is a song by Nigerian recording artist Emmy Gee, featuring Ice Prince, Phyno, AB Crazy, Anatii, Cassper Nyovest and DJ Dimplez. It is a follow-up to his first single "Rands and Nairas". The song was produced by Christian "Vybe Beatz" Arceo with co production from Shizzi, and released under TeamTalkLess.

=== Release history ===
Country	Date	Format	Label
Nigeria	July 14, 2014	Digital download	TeamTalkLess
