= 2014 Channel O Music Video Awards =

Award

Channel O Music Video Awards
- Date: November 29, 2014
- Venue: Nasrec Expo Centre, Soweto
- Country: South Africa

Highlights
- Most awards: Cassper Nyovest, Diamond Platnumz (3 each)
- Most nominations: Cassper Nyovest, Davido, K.O. (5 each)
- Related: South African Music Awards

The 2014 Channel O Music Video Awards took place on 29 November 2014 at the Nasrec Expo Centre in Soweto. Nominees were announced on 4 September. Cassper Nyovest, K.O and Davido led the nominations with 5 each. DJ Clock's hit song "Pluto", which features the singing trio Beatenberg, followed with 4. AKA and Uhuru both received three nominations apiece. Cassper Nyovest and Diamond Platnumz both took home three awards apiece.

== Performers ==
- Davido
- Cassper Nyovest
- K.O
- AKA
- Kwesta
- Patoranking
- Bucie
- Riky Rick
- Lil Kesh
- Olamide
- DJ Dimplez

== Winners and nominees ==
=== Male ===
- Cassper Nyovest - "Doc Shebeleza"
  - Davido - "Aye"
  - Riky Rick featuring Okmalumkoolkat - Amantombazane
  - K.O featuring Kid X - "Caracara"
  - Sarkodie - "Illuminati"

=== Female ===
- Tiwa Savage featuring Don Jazzy - "Eminado"
  - Thembi Seete - "Thuntsha Lerole"
  - Bucie featuring Heavy K - "Easy To Love"
  - Lizha James featuring Uhuru - "Quem Ti Mandou"
  - Seyi Shay - "Irawo"

=== Newcomer ===
- Diamond Platnumz - "Number One"
  - Dream Team featuring Tamarsha, AKA and Big Nuz - Tsekede (Remix)
  - Cassper Nyovest - "Doc Shebeleza"
  - Emmy Gee featuring AB Crazy and DJ Dimplez - "Rands and Nairas"
  - Patoranking featuring Tiwa Savage - "Girlie O (Remix)"

=== Duo/Group or Featuring ===
- KCee featuring Wizkid - "Pull Over"
  - Uhuru featuring Oskido and Professor - "Y-Tjukutja"
  - DJ Clock featuring Beatenberg - "Pluto (I Remember)"
  - R2Bees featuring Wizkid - "Slow Down"
  - K.O featuring Kid X - "Caracara"

=== Dance ===
- Busiswa featuring Oskido and Uhuru - "Ngoku"
  - Uhuru featuring Oskido and Professor - "Y-Tjukutja"
  - Davido - "Skelewu"
  - DJ Clock featuring Beatenberg - "Pluto (I Remember)"
  - P-Square - "Personally"

=== Ragga Dancehall ===
- Buffalo Souljah - Turn Up
  - Orezi - Rihanna"
  - Jesse Jagz featuring Wizkid - "Bad Girl"
  - Patoranking - Girlie O
  - Shatta Wale - "Everybody Likes My Ting"

=== Afro Pop ===
- Diamond Platnumz - "Number One"
  - Davido - "Aye"
  - Mafikizolo featuring May D - "Happiness"
  - Flavour - "Ada Ada"
  - Iyanya - "Jombolo"

=== Kwaito ===
- Uhuru featuring Oskido and Professor - "Y-Tjukutja"
  - Character featuring Mono T and Oskido - "Inxeba Lendoda"
  - Big Nuz featuring Khaya Mthethwa - "Incwadi Yothando"
  - DJ Vetkuk VS Mahoota - "Khaba Lenja"
  - DJ Cndo - "Yamnandi Into"

=== R&B ===
- Donald - "Crazy But Amazing"
  - 2Face featuring T-Pain - "Rainbow"
  - Jimmy Nevis featuring Kwesta - "Balloon"
  - GB Collective featuring Brian Temba and Reason - "Chocolate Vanilla"
  - Niyola - "Toh Bad"

=== Hip-hop ===
- AKA - "Congratulate"
  - Cassper Nyovest - "Doc Shebeleza"
  - Khuli Chana featuring Da L.E.S and Magesh - "Hape Le Hape 2.1"
  - Phyno - "Alobam"
  - K.O featuring Kid X - "Caracara"

=== Southern ===
- Cassper Nyovest - "Doc Shebeleza"
  - DJ Clock featuring Beatenberg - Pluto (I Remember)
  - AKA - "Congratulate"
  - Zeus - Psych
  - K.O featuring Kid X - "Caracara"

=== West ===
- Olamide - "Turn Up"
  - R2Bees featuring Wizkid - "Slow Down"
  - Davido - "Aye"
  - Burna Boy featuring D'banj - "Won Da Mo"
  - Dr SID featuring Don Jazzy - "Surulere"

=== East ===
- Diamond Platnumz - "Number One"
  - Sauti Sol - "Nshike"
  - Navio - "No Holding Back"
  - Eddy Kenzo - "Sitya Loss"
  - Elani - "Kookoo"

=== Video of the Year ===
- Cassper Nyovest - "Doc Shebeleza"
  - Emmy Gee featuring AB Crazy and DJ Dimplez - "Rands and Nairas"
  - Davido - "Aye"
  - K.O featuring Kid X - "Caracara"
  - Burna Boy - "Run My Race"
  - Tiwa Savage featuring Don Jazzy - "Eminado"
  - Dr SID featuring Don Jazzy - "Surulere"
  - Riky Rick featuring Okmalumkoolkat - "Amantombazane"
  - Sarkodie - "Illuminati"
  - DJ Clock featuring Beatenberg - Pluto (I Remember)
  - AKA - "Congratulate"
  - Diamond Platnumz - "Number One"
