= Tkinzy =

Anthony Chukwuebuka Felix aka T'Kinzy
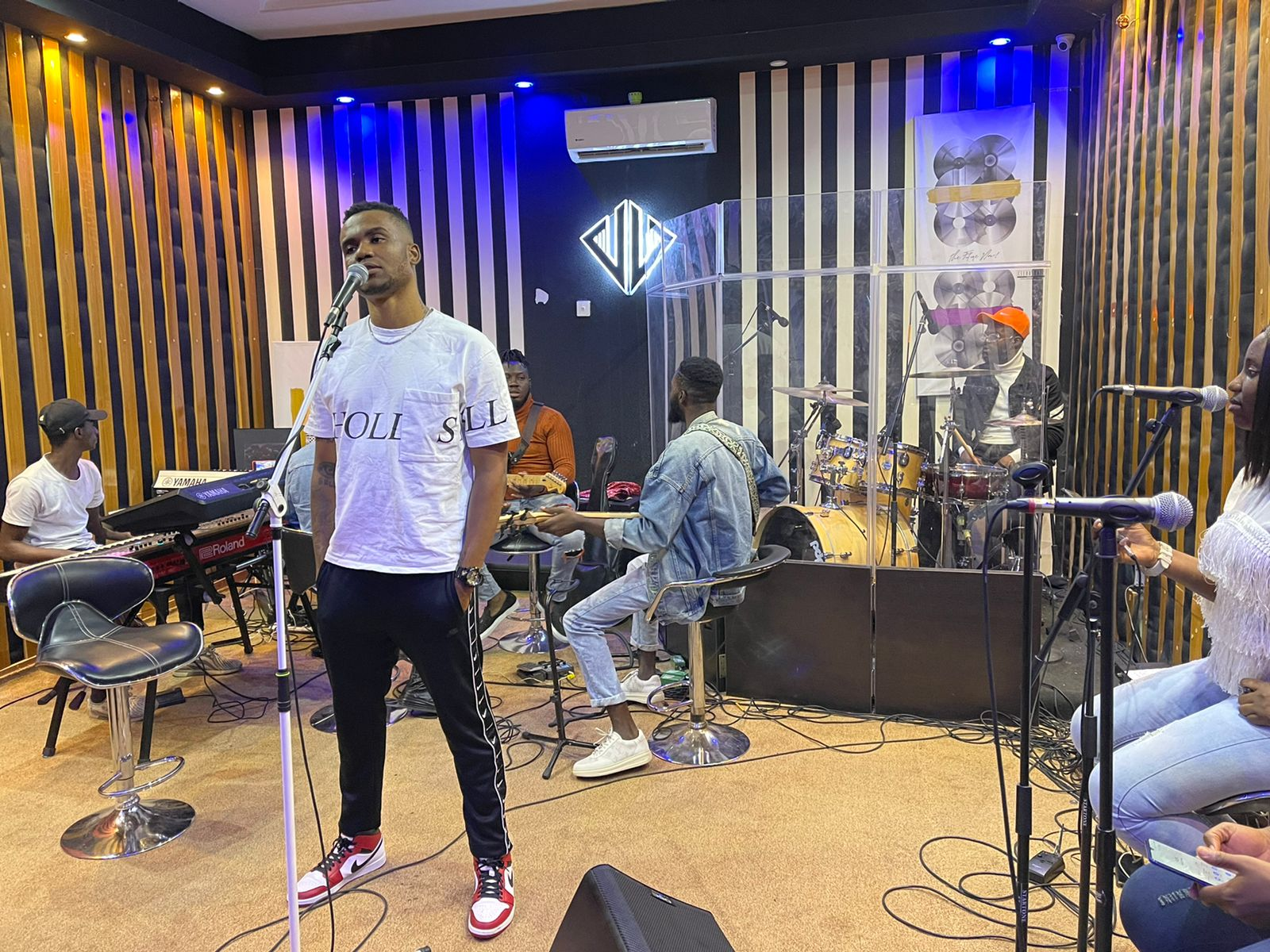

Background information
- Also known as: T'Kinzy
- Born: Anthony Chukwuebuka Felix; Imo State, Nigeria
- Genres: Afrobeat; Reggae; Afrosoul
- Occupations: Singer; songwriter; entrepreneur; rapper
- Years active: 2012–present
- Labels: Gallo Records; Kinging Music Records

Anthony Chukwuebuka Felix (born 10 August 1997), known by his stage name T'kinzy, is a Nigerian singer/songwriter. He is known for his great vocal abilities and for his abilities in writing hit records and verses. He featured in Ndikhokhele Remix by Jub in 2020. The song formally introduced him to his growing fanbase in South Africa, Which also became the number one song on Apple Music worldwide. In 2021, he released a single "Uthando" featuring MLINDO the vocalist, which became a huge success. 2022 has seen his debut EP, Which has a hit song; Sola, featuring Teni

== Biography ==
=== Early life and education ===
The only child of his parents of the Igbo extraction in southeastern Nigeria, T'Kinzy was born in Yenagoa, Bayelsa State, Nigeria. When he was two, his mother died in an auto crash and he moved to Aba with his father.

=== Music ===
He released two singles under Soul Candi and did a collaboration with a top South African artiste called Ntando Bangani, "That’s The Way". The song brought him to the attention of Gallo Records, with whom he signed in 2012, becoming the first Nigerian artist to sign a full record deal with a South African record company. He released a single, "Shake Ikebe", which featured fellow Nigerian rapper Emmy Gee co-produced by South African rapper and producer Emtee. Other notable T'kinzy tracks include "Wozaza" featuring AB Crazy. He then embarked on a musical hiatus after exiting Gallo Records, returning to the music industry in 2020. Again, 2020 saw him feature in Ndikhokhele Remix By Jub Jub. The song introduced him to his South African fans, as it became more popular in Apple Music. 2021, he released "Uthando" as a single with MLINDO the vocalist, before releasing his debut EP featuring Teni in 2022.

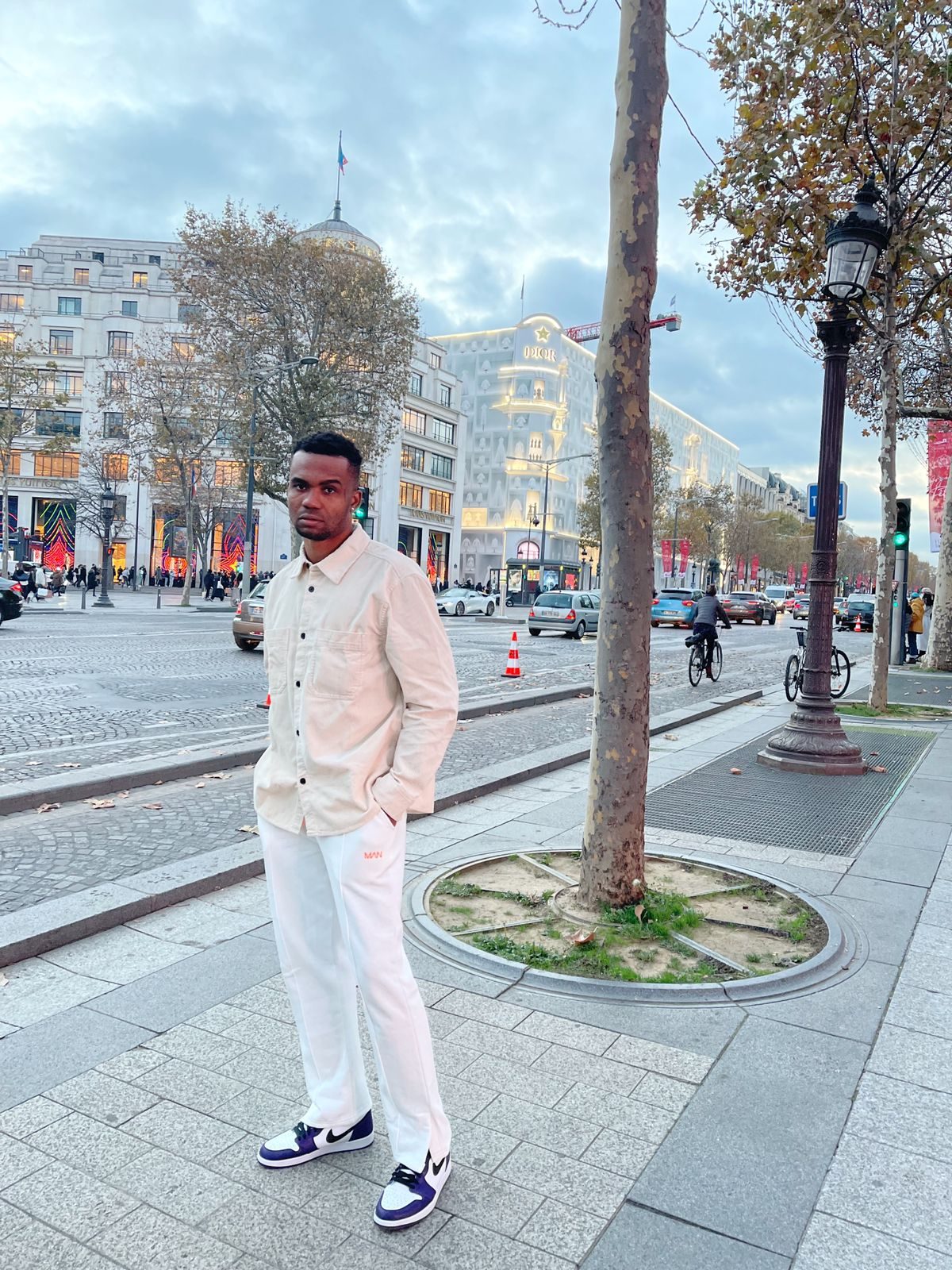
Tkinzy in Paris

== See also ==
List of Nigerian rappers
