= Caracara (song) =

2014 single by K.O

Single by K.O featuring KiD X

from the album Skhanda Republic
- Released: 3 March 2014
- Recorded: 2014
- Genre: Hip hop, Kwaito, Skhanda rap
- Length: 3:46
- Label: Cashtime Life
- Songwriters: Ntokozo Mdluli; Bonginkosi Mahlangu
- Producers: Lunatik; K.O

K.O singles chronology
"Run Jozi (Godly)" (2013)	"Caracara" (2014)	"One Time" (2015)

Music video
- "Caracara" on YouTube

"Caracara" is the second solo single by South African recording artist K.O, featuring Kid X, released by Cashtime Life on 3 March 2014. It was released on various digital platforms. A major crossover hit, "Caracara" peaked at number 6 on South Africa's official music chart. It was the first South African music video to surpass 1 million views on YouTube.

Production was handled by Lunatik, who also produced Kid X's debut single "Pass n Special". The music video for "Caracara" was released via YouTube on 25 April 2014.

== Accolades ==
=== Channel O Africa Music Video Awards ===
Year	Nominee / work	Award	Result	Ref
2014	"Caracara"	Most Gifted Male	Nominated	
2014	"Caracara"	Most Gifted Duo/Group or Featuring Artist	Nominated	
2014	"Caracara"	Most Gifted Hip Hop	Nominated	
2014	"Caracara"	Most Gifted Southern Artist	Nominated	
2014	"Caracara"	Most Gifted Video of the Year	Nominated	

== Composition and meaning ==
"Caracara" marks the departure of K.O from his previous sound with Teargas. The majority of the song's chorus heavily interpolates "Bengimngaka" by Kwaito group Trompies. The song explores a new subgenre of hip hop known as Skhanda rap which fuses elements of Kwaito and rap music.

"Caracara" is a South African term for the Volkswagen Microbus, considered a popular vehicle in South African townships during the 90's. During the second part of the chorus, which is in Zulu, K.O recites "Ngiblome neziphalaphala, phakathi kwe caracara", which, when loosely translated, means, "I'm hanging around beautiful women, sitting inside a microbus".

== Reception ==
The song's general reception was positive, earning K.O 5 nominations at the 2014 Channel O Music Video Awards.

== Music video ==
In April 2014, its music video was released on YouTube. It features K.O and Kid X dressed in pantsula attire as well as cameo appearances by AKA, Cashtime Life and its affiliates.

The video also features numerous scenes showing Caravelles cruising through the township.

"Caracara" became the first South African music video to surpass 1 million views, achieving this 7 months after its release, and has garnered over 3 million views on YouTube.

== Charts ==
Chart (2014)	Peak position
South Africa (EMA)	6
