= Skhanda Republic =

2014 studio album by K.O

Studio album by K.O
- Released: 7 November 2014
- Recorded: 2013–14
- Genre: Hip hop; rap; Skhanda rap
- Length: 43:32
- Label: Cashtime
- Producer: Lunatik; Dj Vigilante

K.O chronology
Skhanda Republic (2014)	Skhanda Republic 2 (2017)

Singles from Skhanda Republic
- 1. "Mission Statement" Released: 25 September 2013; 2. "Caracara" Released: 3 March 2014; 3. "Son Of A Gun" Released: 13 September 2014; 4. "Skhanda Love" Released: 28 January 2015; 5. "One Time" Released: 9 June 2015

Skhanda Republic is the debut studio album by South African hip hop artist K.O. The album was released on 7 November 2014 under Cashtime record label.

== Track listing ==
No.	Title	Writer(s)	Producer(s)	Length
1.	"Delakufa"	Ntokozo Mdluli	Lunatik	4:59
2.	"Caracara" (featuring Kid X)	Ntokozo Mdluli; Bonginkosi Mahlangu	Lunatik	3:46
3.	"No Fear (freestyle)"	Ntokozo Mdluli		3:52
4.	"Son Of A Gun"	Ntokozo Mdluli		3:18
5.	"One Time" (featuring Maggz, Masandi & Ma-E)	Ntokozo Mdluli; Gift Magubane; Sandile Mfusi; Ezee Hanabe		3:57
6.	"Skhanda Love" (featuring Nandi Mngoma)	Ntokozo Mdluli; Nandi Mngoma	Lunatik	4:10
7.	"Benithin"	Ntokozo Mdluli		3:31
8.	"Askies I'm sorry"	Ntokozo Mdluli		4:10
9.	"Nombolo"	Ntokozo Mdluli		4:26
10.	"Ding Dong"	Ntokozo Mdluli		3:26
11.	"Mission Statement"	Ntokozo Mdluli	Brian Soko	3:44
Total length:				43:32

== Certifications ==
Region	Certification	Certified units/sales
South Africa (RISA)	Platinum	30,000^{‡}
^{‡} Sales+streaming figures based on certification alone.
