= Risky (Elaine song) =

2019 song by Elaine

Song by Elaine

from the EP Elements
- Released: 28 September 2019
- Genre: Contemporary R&B
- Length: 3:02
- Label: Elaine Music; Columbia Records
- Songwriter: Ndivhuwo Elaine Mukheli
- Producer: Clxrity

Elaine chronology
"I Just Wanna Know" (2019)	"Risky" (2019)	"Right Now" (2021)

Music video
- "Risky (Official music video)"

Official audio
- "Risky"

"Risky" is a song by South African singer-songwriter mononymously known as Elaine from her debut extended play Elements (2019), it was released on 28 September 2019 through Elaine Music and re-released on 11 August 2020 through Columbia Records (a division of Sony Music). In late 2020 It was certified multi-platinum by the Recording Industry of South Africa (RiSA).

Elaine released the visuals for "Risky" subsequent to signing a recording deal with Columbia Records.

== Certifications ==
Region	Certification	Certified units/sales
South Africa (RISA)	3× Platinum	60,000^{‡}
^{‡} Sales+streaming figures based on certification alone.
