= Emmy Gee =

Nigerian rapper (born 1986)

- Born: Emmanuel Nwankwo; 10 August 1986 (age 40); Nigeria
- Origin: Johannesburg, South Africa
- Genre: Hip hop
- Occupations: Rapper; singer; entrepreneur
- Years active: 2013–present
- Label: Teamtalkless

Emmanuel Nwankwo (born 10 August 1986), known by his stage name Emmy Gee, is a Nigerian rapper who currently resides in South Africa. His debut single, "Rands and Nairas", peaked at number 7 on South Africa's official music chart. He started recording music at the age of 16, and worked with producer Shizzi in 2004. He co-founded the entertainment and clothing apparel company known as Teamtalkless.

== Early life and breakthrough single ==
Emmy Gee was born in Nigeria and is a descendant of the Igbo tribe. He is the last born of four siblings. He completed his primary and secondary education in Nigeria prior to relocating to South Africa. Emmy Gee's debut single, "Rands and Nairas", was released in 2013 and features rappers AB Crazy and DJ Dimplez. In an interview with Zalebs in 2014, Emmy Gee said he had a feeling the song was going be successful after recording it. He revealed that AB Crazy wrote the song's hook and said they recorded the song to showcase the unity between Nigeria and South Africa. The music video for "Rands and Nairas" was filmed in South Africa by Nick Roux of Molotov Cocktail Productions. On July 14, 2014, Emmy Gee released the remix of "Rands and Nairas", which includes rap verses by Ice Prince, AB Crazy, Anatii, Phyno, Cassper Nyovest and DJ Dimplez. Emmy Gee was among the few artists selected to perform at the first Mandela Day concert in 2014.

== Personal life ==
Emmy Gee has a daughter who was born in South Africa in 2016.

== Discography ==
=== Singles ===
List of singles as featured artist, with selected chart positions, showing year released and album name
Title	Year	Peak chart positions	Album
Title	Year	SA	Album
"Rands and Nairas" (featuring AB Crazy and DJ Dimplez)	2013	7	TBA
"Rands and Nairas (Remix)" (featuring Ice Prince, AB Crazy, Anatii, Phyno, Cassper Nyovest and DJ Dimplez)	2014		TBA
"Champagne Showers" (featuring King Jay)	2015		TBA

==== As featured artist ====
List of singles as featured artist, with selected chart positions and certifications, showing year released and album name
Artist	Title	Year	Peak chart positions	Album
Artist	Title	Year	SA	Album
Buffalo Souljah	"Ziyawa" (featuring. Red Button & Emmy Gee)	2014		The Chosen One
Bolo J	"This Year" (featuring. Emmy Gee)	2015		Non-album singles
DJ Dimplez	"Bae Coupe" (featuring. Ice Prince, Emmy Gee & Riky Rick)	2015		Non-album singles
DJ Scratch Masta	"To the Tope" (featuring. Emmy Gee, AB Crazy & Eindo)	2016		Non-album singles
King Jay	"Owami" (featuring. Emmy Gee)	2016		Non-album singles
Tkinzy	"Shake Ikebe" (featuring. Emmy Gee)	2016		Non-album singles
Teamtalkless	"Church" (featuring. DJ Dimplez, TRK, Emmy Gee & King Jay)	2017		Non-album singles
DJ Kaywise	"Normal Level" (featuring. Ice Prince, Kly & Emmy Gee)	2018		TBA

== Awards and nominations ==
Year	Awards ceremony	Award description(s)	Recipient	Results	Ref
2014	Nigeria Entertainment Awards	Best Music Video of the Year (Artist & Director)	"Rands and Nairas"	Won	
2014	Nigeria Entertainment Awards	Diaspora Artist of the Year	Himself	Nominated	
2014	Channel O Music Video Awards	Most Gifted Newcomer	Himself	Nominated	
2014	Channel O Music Video Awards	Most Gifted Video of the Year	"Rands and Nairas"	Nominated	
2015	Nigeria Entertainment Awards	Diaspora Artist of the Year	"Himself"	Nominated	

== See also ==
List of Nigerian rappers
