= SR3 (album) =

Studio album by K.O
- Released: September 16, 2022
- Length: 48:00
- Label: Skhanda World; Sony Music
- Producer: Ntokozo Mdluli (exec.) Lunatik Tsolofelo Moremedi (exec.)

K.O chronology
PTY UnLTD (2019)	SR3 (2022)

Singles from SR3
- 1. "Sete" Released: 19 August 2022

SR3 (short for Skhanda Republic 3) is a fourth studio album by South African rapper K.O, released on September 16, 2022, through Skhanda World and Sony Music.

== Background ==
Release date was announced on August 19, 2022, on Twitter by K.O captioned; "#SR3 dropping 16/09/2022". It was scheduled to be released on September 16, 2022.

SR3's final track listing was revealed on September 9, 2022.

== Critical reception ==
The Plug said, "As much as he reinvents himself regularly, he never loses the essence of his artistic DNA".

== Commercial performance ==
The album was certified Platinum in South Africa.

== Awards ==
At the 2023 Metro FM Awards SR3, was nominated for Best Hip hop Artist. At the 29th South African Music Awards, SR3 received two nominations for Male Artist of the Year and Album of the Year.

Year	Nominee / work	Award	Result
2023	SR3	Best Hip hop Artist	Nominated
2023	SR3	Male Artist of the Year	Nominated
2023	SR3	Album of the Year	Pending

== Track listing ==
SR3 Track listing
No.	Title	Writer(s)	Length
1.	"Empire - Intro"		4:13
2.	"Moshito"		2:25
3.	"SETE" (featuring Young Stunna and Blxckie)	Ntokozo Mdluli; Sihle Sithole	4:09
4.	"MS3"		3:34
5.	"Fezeka" (featuring Pabi Cooper, Zuma and Sarkodie)		3:55
6.	"The Calling"		3:07
7.	"Owami" (featuring Msaki)	Asanda Mvana Lusaseni	3:13
8.	"SkhandaVille (Free Style)"		3:56
9.	"Demon" (featuring Ruger)
10.	"Hate LUV"		4:27
11.	"Piano"		1:55
12.	"The Light"		3:03
13.	"B.O.A.T"		3:06
14.	"Stapura" (featuring Sjava)	Jabulani Hadebe	3:26
Total length:			48:00

== Singles ==
"Sete" featuring Young Stunna and Blxckie was released on August 19, 2022, as album's lead single. It debuted number one in South Africa.

== Certifications ==
Region	Certification	Certified units/sales
South Africa (RISA)	Platinum	30,000^{‡}
^{‡} Sales+streaming figures based on certification alone.

== Release history ==
Release history and formats for SR3
Region	Date	Format	Version	Label	Ref.
South Africa	16 September 2022	Digital download; streaming	Original	Skhanda World; Sony Music	
