= Malumz on Decks =

South African DJ and producer

- Origin: Johannesburg, South Africa
- Genres: House; Afro house; Deep House
- Years active: 2016–present
- Labels: OWN IT MUSIC; Music Central Africa
- Members: Oscar Nyathi; Mandla Mtshali

Malumz on Decks is a house music DJ and producer duo originating from South Africa, consisting of Oscar Nyathi and Mandla Mtshali. Their name "Malumz" when translated from Zulu, means "Uncles".

== History ==
Malumz on Decks music group members are originally from Ekurhuleni, east of Johannesburg. Before they became a duo, the Kempton Park residents were on separate paths with different names. Mtshali, also known as Mandla the DJ, was in partnership with Noxious Deejay, who was a solo music producer at the time, while Nyathi was a promoter who later became a DJ. The duo often spent time together before they eventually became friends and supported each other during their respective gigs.

In 2017, they released their debut album The journey. A year later they released their single, "Shay’ Number" which became the most played song on South African radio stations.

In June 2019, they released the album Find Your Way which featured singers KB Motsilanyane on the single "Taba tsa ha" and Moneoa on the single "I’m Moving On". In that same year, To further expand the duo's vision in 2020 they partnered up with Roro Morudi and relaunched Jubilee Vibes, a shisa nyama in Kempton Park. The duo has also received recognition and nominations for their songs. Later that year, they were nominated for Record of the Year at the 2019 South African Music Awards. The album, Find Your Way which brought them the SAMA Song of the year nominated single "Shayi’Number", was further recognised by gaining three more SAMA nominations at the 2020 South African Music Awards. The duo is also signed as resident DJs on Metro FM's Urban Beat.

In October 2020, their third album Afro Is Africa. The album featured collaborations from local musicians SoulStar, Eltonnick, Lizwi, Bontle Smith, Tabia, Lizwi, Khanyisa and DOT.

Their single "S'vuthela iNumber" featuring Murumba Pitch was released on August 26, 2021. The song debuted number 1 on Channel 0 Top 30.

At the end of October 2023, Malumz teased their single "Teka", a collaboration with Mpho.Wav, captioned "Counting down to November 10". The song was released on November 10, 2023. It debuted number 4 on Radio Monitor Chart.

Their extended play Uzuri, was released on May 24, 2024.

== Musical style ==
They create house music containing elements of afro house and Deep house, combining live instruments such as bass, keyboards, percussions, flute, and vocals with samplers, effects and synths. Explaining their musical style:

Different songs give us different feelings and it's almost as if we can feel the energy or potential to get people on the dance floor, as well as visualise how people will move to the music. A lot of music moves us emotionally, whether it makes us sad, happy, hyper, energetic or relaxed. We find music to be extremely powerful.

== Members ==
- Oscar Nyathi – basslines, kicks, vocals, percussions
- Mandla Mtshali – melodies, chords, drums, piano

== Awards and nominations ==
Year	Award ceremony	Prize	Result
2019	South African Music Award	Record of the Year	Nominated
2020	South African Music Award	Best Dance Album	Nominated
2020	South African Music Award	Best Duo/Group of the Year	Nominated
2020	South African Music Award	Best Remix of the Year	Won
2021	South African Music Award	Best Produced Video	Nominated

== Discography ==
- The Journey (2017)
- Find Your Way (2019)
- Afro Is Africa (2020)
- Uzuri (2024)
- Abadu (with Zulu Mageba) (2024)

=== As lead artist ===
List of singles as lead artist, with selected chart positions and certifications, showing year released and album name
Title	Year	Peak chart positions	Certifications	Album
Title	Year	ZA	Certifications	Album
"Teka" (Malumz on Decks, Mpho.Wav)	2023	4		Uzuri
"—" denotes a recording that did not chart or was not released in that territory.

=== Guest appearances ===
Title	Year	Other artist(s)	Album
"Rain Down"	2024	Mpho.Wav, Fasto 98	Book of Wav
