= B4Now =

Studio album by Blxckie
- Released: 21 May 2021
- Genres: Hip Hop; R&B
- Length: 35:36 (Standard); 58:00 (Deluxe)
- Languages: English; Zulu
- Label: M4 Entertainment
- Producers: Christer (also exec); Loud Haileer; Blxckie; Herc; Wxvambient; Geek Fam; 808 Sallie; Jeremiah Beyer

Blxckie chronology
Blxck Panda EP (2020)	B4Now (2021)	4LUV EP (2022)

Singles from B4Now
- 1. "Big Time Sh'lappa" Released: 13 November 2020; 2. "David" Released: 30 April 2021; 3. "Ye x4" Released: 14 May 2021

B4Now (pronounced Before Now) is the debut studio album by South African rapper Blxckie, released on 21 May 2021 through M4 Entertainment. It debuted at number one in South Africa. The album was certified Gold in South Africa. The album features guest appearances from South African rapper, Nasty C, FLVME and Lucasraps. Production is handled by Christer, Loud Haileer, Herc, Geek Fam, 808 Sallie and others.

The Deluxe version was released a few months later in August of 2021 and was loaded with features, including Nigerian Afrobeat artists Oxlade, Alone, Rowlene, Christer and more.

== Background ==
In early May 2021, he announced released date his debut album B4Now.

"B4now is a mixture of stuff I was doing before I got into the ‘;Big Time Sh;lappa' era, and then some new songs also," Blxckie said. "I'm also telling people a story about how things happened—me being in Durban for a while, and then coming to Jozi to work out a plan to do everything. It's basically an introduction."

== Commercial performance ==
The album debuted number one in South Africa. B4Now deluxe edition was certified gold with sales of over 10,000 units.

== Release and promotion ==
B4Now was released on 21 May 2021. To further promote his album he embarked on B4Now Tour which included 10 dates.

== Critical reception ==
Upon its release, it received positive reviews from music critics, Ubetoo wrote; "It's a highly relatable compilation that should have an eager audience out there".

== Track listing ==
B4now track listing
No.	Title	Writer(s)	Producer(s)	Length
1.	"Mama It's Bad"	Sihle Sithole; Christer Mofenyi Kobedi; Kagiso Wandile Mabunda	Christer; Wxvambiant	2:55
2.	"Stripes" (featuring FLVME)	Sihle Sithole; Lesego Kyle Mnyandu; Isaiah Nkhalo Zuza	Herc	2:45
3.	"David"	Sihle Sithole; Kagiso Wandile Mabunda	Wxvambiant	3:52
4.	"Gas"	Sihle Sithole; Isaiah Nkhalo Zuza	Herc	3:04
5.	"Hut"	Sihle Sithole; Jeremiah Beyer	Jeremiah Beyer	2:12
6.	"Sika"	Sihle Sithole; Christer Mofenyi Kobedi	Christer	2:55
7.	"Hold"	Sihle Sithole; Christer Mofenyi Kobedi; Vaughan Fourie	Christer; Loud Haileer	5:06
8.	"Big Time Sh'lappa" (featuring Lucasraps)	Sihle Sithole; Luke Malong		3:21
9.	"Steppin'"	Sihle Sithole	808 Sallie	1:47
10.	"Uppity"	Sihle Sithole	808 Sallie	2:12
11.	"Ye x4" (featuring Nasty C)	Sihle Sithole; Nsikayesizwe David Jr. Ngcobo	Geek Fam	2:45
12.	"Tall"	Sihle Sithole	Blxckie	3:13
Total length:				35:36

Deluxe edition
No.	Title	Writer(s)	Producer(s)	Length
13.	"Mama It's Bad 2"	Sihle Sithole; Christer Mofenyi Kobedi; Kagiso Wandile Mabunda	Christer; Wxvambiant	2:14
14.	"Godbody"	Sihle Sithole		2:47
15.	"Joy" (featuring Oxlade)	Sihle Sithole; Ikuforiji Abdulrahman Olaitan; Christer Mofenyi Kobedi	Christer	3:38
16.	"Guns and Roses" (featuring Alone)	Sihle Sithole; Alone; Isaiah Nkhalo Zuza	Herc	1:48
17.	"Whoa" (featuring Rowlene)	Sihle Sithole; Rowlene Nicole Bosman; Christer Mofenyi Kobedi; Vaughan Fourie	Christer; Loud Haileer	2:59
18.	"Quick Maths" (featuring Leodaleo)	Sihle Sithole		1:47
19.	"Blessed"	Sihle Sithole; Jeremiah Beyer	Jeremiah Beyer	2:25
20.	"Tired" (featuring Christer)	Sihle Sithole; Christer Kobedi; Vaughan Fourie; Fundile Dlamini; Tshupho Khutsoane	Christer; Loud Haileer; FD; Zadok	4:25
Total length:				58:00

== Awards ==
At the 2021 South African Hip Hop Awards, B4Now was nominated for Album of the Year and won Freshman of the Year. In addition, B4Now won Best Hip Hop Album at the 28th South African Music Awards.

Year	Nominee / work	Award	Result	Ref.
2021	B4Now	Fresheman of the Year	Won	
2021	B4Now	Album of the Year	Nominated	
2022	B4Now	Best Hip Hop Album	Won	

== Release history ==
Country	Date	Edition(s)	Label
South Africa	May 21, 2021	Standard	M4 Entertainment
South Africa	August 13, 2021	Deluxe	M4 Entertainment
