= Ace of Spades (De Mthuda and Ntokzin album) =

2020 studio album by De Mthuda and Ntokzin

Studio album by De Mthuda and Ntokzin
- Released: 20 November 2020
- Genre: Amapiano
- Length: 102:40
- Language: Zulu language
- Label: Universal Music South Africa; Born in Soweto
- Producer: De Mthuda; Ntokzin; Da Muziqal Chef; Sam Deep

De Mthuda chronology
Story to Tell, Vol. 1 (2020)	Ace of Spades (2020)	The Landlord (2021)

Ntokzin chronology
Ace of Spades (2020)	Black Duke (2021)

Singles from Ace of Spades
- 1. "Maplankeng" Released: 15 October 2020

Ace of Spades is a collaborative studio album by De Mthuda and Ntokzin, it was released on 20 November 2020 through Born in Soweto under exclusive license from Universal Music South Africa. On 21 June 2023 the album was certified Platinum by the Recording Industry of South Africa (RiSA).

The collaborative album was led by a single "Maplankeng" which was certified Gold on 21 June 2023, it also features certified songs like "Dakwa Yini" which is Gold, and "uMsholozi" was certified Multi-Platinum.

== Track listing ==
All music is composed by Mthuthuzeli Gift Khoza and Ntokozo Rarane

Ace of Spade credits adapted from Apple Music.
No.	Title	Writer(s)	Producer(s)	Length
1.	"uMsholozi (featuring MalumNator)"	Sizwe Alfred Mthimunye	De Mthuda; Ntokzin	6:41
2.	"Maplankeng"		De Mthuda; Ntokzin	6:18
3.	"Dakwa Yini (featuring MalumNator)"	Sizwe Alfred Mthimunye	De Mthuda; Ntokzin	6:19
4.	"Vula Vala"		De Mthuda; Ntokzin	7:13
5.	"Ghost"		De Mthuda; Ntokzin	9:08
6.	"Gear 1"		De Mthuda; Ntokzin	5:51
7.	"Boss Zonke"		De Mthuda; Ntokzin	6:35
8.	"Wawela (featuring TaSkipper and Khanya Greens)"	F Shabalala; Khanyisile Ngutshane	De Mthuda; Ntokzin	6:44
9.	"Igama Lam (featuring DJ Boo, Lady Du and Da Muziqal Chef)"	T. Semake; D. Ngwenya	De Mthuda; Ntokzin; Da Musiqal Chef	8:22
10.	"Vutha (featuring Sam Deep)"		De Mthuda; Ntokzin; Sam Deep	8:03
11.	"Forbes (featuring Kammu Dee and Njelic)"	Kamogelo Duma; Tshwarelo Albert Motlhako	De Mthuda; Ntokzin	5:07
12.	"Rough Dance"		De Mthuda; Ntokzin	6:11
13.	"Kabo Yellow (featuring MalumNator and Njelic)"	Sizwe Alfred Mthimunye; Tshwarelo Albert Motlhako	De Mthuda; Ntokzin	6:37
14.	"Moja"		De Mthuda; Ntokzin	7:03
15.	"Extended"		De Mthuda; Ntokzin	6:28
Total length:				1:42:40

== Certifications ==
Region	Certification	Certified units/sales
South Africa (RISA)	Platinum	30,000^{‡}
^{‡} Sales+streaming figures based on certification alone.

== Awards and nominations ==
In 2021 the album was nominated and also won an Amapiano Music Award for Amapiano Album of the Year.

Year	Award ceremony	Category	Recipient/Nominated work	Results	Ref.
2021	SA Amapiano Music Awards	Amapiano Album of the Year	Ace of Spades	Won	
