= You're the One (Elaine song) =

2019 song by Elaine

Song by Elaine

from the EP Elements
- Released: 29 September 2019
- Genre: Contemporary R&B
- Length: 3:20
- Label: Elaine Music; Columbia Records
- Songwriter(s): Ndivhuwo Elaine Mukheli
- Producer(s): Clxrity

Elaine chronology
"I/You" (2019)	"You're the One" (2019)	"Changes" (2019)

Music video
- "You're the One (Official music video)"

Official audio
- "You're the One"

"You're the One" is a self-released song by South African singer-songwriter mononymously known as Elaine from her debut extended play Elements (2019). It was released on 29 September 2019 through Elaine Music, and re-released on 11 August 2020 through Columbia Records (a division of Sony Music). The song was certified multi-platinum by the Recording Industry of South Africa (RiSA).

== Certifications ==
Region	Certification	Certified units/sales
South Africa (RISA)	7× Platinum	140,000^{‡}
^{‡} Sales+streaming figures based on certification alone.
