= Fka Mash =

Mashoto Gabedi Lekgothoane, professionally known as Fka Mash, is a South African DJ and music producer. Born and raised in Soweto, his musical career began at the age of 12 in 2006.

Mash collaborated on "Sad To Think Remixes" by Stay True Sounds released on June 7, 2019. His remix "Sad To Think (Fka Mash Glitch Dub)" won Remix of the Year at the 2019 Dance Music Awards South Africa and was nominated for Remix of the Year at the 26th ceremony of South African Music Awards.

Mash appeared on "Caution To The Wind" remix by Everything But The Girl released on May 31, 2023.

== Singles ==
=== As lead artist ===
List of singles as lead artist, with selected chart positions and certifications, showing year released and album name
Title	Year	Peak chart positions	Certifications	Album
Title	Year	ZA	Certifications	Album
"Bumblebee" (Fka Mash, Sio)	2022	—		Non-album single
"Makwande" (Sun-El Musician, Ami Faku, Fka Mash)	2022	—		AEDM: Interstellar
"Mend It / Your Eyes" (Lazarusman, Stimming, Fka Mash)	2023	—		Non-album single
"In The Crowd" (Fka Mash, Biishop)	2024	—		Non-album single
"Sensibility" (Fka Mash, Soul Of Zoo, Tyler W)	2024	—		Non-album single
"—" denotes a recording that did not chart or was not released in that territory.

== Discography ==
=== Extended plays ===
- What I Think About (2022)
- Layki (2023)

=== Guest appearances ===
Title	Year	Other artist(s)	Album
"Andifuni ngawe"	2020	Lemon & Herb, Yallunder	Aura
"Huzet"	2022	Kwesta, Kabza De Small	Speak n Vrostaan

== Awards and nominations ==
=== Dance Music Awards South Africa ===
Year	Nominee / work	Award	Result	Ref.
2019	"Sad To Think" (Fka Mash Glitch Dub) - Sculptured Music	Remix of the Year	Won	

=== South African Music Awards ===
Year	Nominee / work	Award	Result	Ref.
2020	"Sad To Think" (Fka Mash Glitch Dub) - Sculptured Music	Remix of the Year	Nominated	
