= Lunatik (music producer) =

South African producer / disc jockey

Background information
- Born: Mnqobi Nxumalo; 8 June 1994 (age 31); Empangeni, KwaZulu-Natal, South Africa
- Origin: Esikhawini, KwaZulu-Natal
- Genres: Hip hop; Kwaito; Skhanda
- Occupations: record producer; songwriter
- Instruments: Piano; sampler
- Years active: 2009–present
- Label: Wav Fiends

Mnqobi Nxumalo (born 8 June 1994), professionally known as Lunatik (or Lunatik Beats) is a recording artist, songwriter, and record producer born in the town of Empangeni, KwaZulu-Natal, South Africa. He founded the hip hop sub-genre known as Skhanda along with South African rapper K.O.

== Early life ==
Lunatik started making music in 2009. He started releasing his own mixtapes at the age of 15 while producing for a number of local rappers from his hometown. He matriculated from Grantliegh College in 2012 and subsequently relocated to Johannesburg, where he enrolled at the Academy of Sound Engineering but later dropped out. Through his uncle he was introduced to Jabu Nkabinde (Rich Mahog) who is close friends with rapper AKA, who then took him under his wing.

== Career ==
=== 2013–15 ===
He became one of the most sought after producers in the industry after the release of rapper K.O's 2014 mainstream hip hop album Skhanda Republic. He produced 9 out of 11 songs on the album. The album included the self produced hit song Caracara featuring former label mate Kid X which was released by Cashtime Life on 3 March 2014. The song was a major crossover hit and peaked at number 6 on South Africa's official music chart. The song also went on to become the first hip hop song in South African history to amass over 1 million views on YouTube. The song was also nominated for Best Hit Single, Best Collaboration and Best Music Video at the 14th Annual Metro FM Awards. During his tenure at Cashtime Life, Lunatik was also handling production for then label mates Kid X, Ma-E, Moozlie and Maggz.

=== 2015–17 ===
After the success of Skhanda Republic Lunatik left Cashtime Life to partner with Ambitiouz Entertainment, a record label founded by Kgosi Mahumapelo, brother to the South African politician Supra Mahumapelo. During his partnership with Ambitiouz he produced a number of singles for Fifi Cooper, A-Reece, Saudi, Sjava, Miss Pru and Emtee. The most notable production during this era was Ameni, produced alongside Tweezy, Ruff & Bizzboi and Amanda Black's hit singles "Amazulu", produced alongside Christer & Vuyo Manyike, which went on to be certified platinum by RISA and "Kahle" which was certified Gold.

=== 2021–present: New projects ===
At the 2021 South African Hip Hop Awards, he received a nomination for Producer of the Year.

== Discography ==
=== Singles produced ===
- "Caracara" (feat. Kid X)" (2014)
- "Pass n Special" Kid X (2014)
- "Coolerbag" Kid X (2014)
- "uGogo" Ma-E (2014)
- "Cho Dlozi" Maggz (2014)
- "Dont Panic" Dj Speedsta & Moozlie
- "Phanda Mo" Dj Slim (feat. Yanga, Tshego, Emtee and Cassper Nyovest) (2016)
- "Ameni" Ms. Pru (2016)
- "Vura" Dj Citilyts (2015)
- "Winning" A-Reece
- "Platinum" Emtee (2017)
- "Pray For Me" Emtee
- "Bambelela" Emtee
- "My OG" Emtee
- "Kulomhlaba" Sjava
- "Wamuhle" Sjava
- "Amazulu" Amanda Black
- "Kahle" Amanda Black
- "Amalobolo" Okmalumkoolkat
- "Smokolo" Priddy Ugly (2017)
- "Hase Mo States" Cassper Nyovest (2018)
- "Mshimane 2.0" Stino Le Thwenny (feat. K.O, Khuli Chana and Major League DJ's)
- "K:HOVA" K.O
- "GODLIKE" A-Reece
- "Khuliyano" Khuli Chana
- "Let Me Cook" K.O & Maglera Doe Boy
- "Dlala Vilakazi" Kwesta
- "Ghost" Kwesta
- "Nyakanyaka" Kwesta

== Awards and nomination ==
Award	Year	Recipient(s) and nominee(s)	Category	Result	Ref.
South African Hip Hop Awards	2021	Himself	Producer of the Year	Nominated	
South African Hip Hop Awards	2022	Himself	Producer of the Year	Won	
