= K.O (rapper) =

South African rapper, songwriter, record producer and businessman

- Also known as: Skhanda Gawd; K:Hova; Ndade; Mr. Cashtime
- Born: Ntokozo Mdluli; 13 October 1980 (age 46); Mkhondo, Mpumalanga, South Africa
- Genre: Hip hop
- Occupations: Rapper; songwriter; record producer; businessman
- Years active: 2005–present
- Labels: Cashtime Life (former); Sony Music Africa; Skhanda World
- Formerly of: Teargas

Ntokozo Mdluli (born 13 October 1978), known professionally as K.O, is a South African rapper, songwriter, record producer and businessman He began his career as a member of Teargas, a hip hop group which released its debut album, K'shubile K'bovu, in 2006, followed by Wafa Wafa (2008), Dark or Blue (2009) and Num8er Num8er (2012).

After leaving Teargas, K.O pursued a solo career and released his solo debut album, Skhanda Republic (2014). It debuted at #1 in South Africa and was certified platinum by the Recording Industry of South Africa (RISA).

K.O's second studio album, Skhanda Republic 2 (2017), was released in partnership with Sony Music Entertainment Africa.

His fourth studio album, SR3 (2022), was certified platinum by Recording Industry of South Africa. It spawned a single, "SETE", which debuted at number one on Radio Monitor Charts, where it stayed for 19 consecutive weeks, his first single to reach that summit.

His accolades includes six South African Music Awards, three South African Hip Hop Awards and an MTV Award.

== Early life ==
Ntokozo Mdluli was born 13 October 1980 in Soweto Johannesburg. He is the son of Thembisile Mdluli and Jabulani Mdluli. K.O attended Vaal University of Technology and obtained a National Diploma in Public Relations Management. After graduating, he spent two years unemployed before his mother submitted his résumé to the South African Police Service, although he ultimately did not attend the interview.

While attending Vaal University of Technology, Mdluli met his would-be bandmates Ezee "Ma-E" Hanabe and Bantu "Ntukza" Hanabe. After completing his studies, K.O spent two years unemployed before his mother sent his CV to the South African Police Service. "I was trying to make demos with funding from my parents and they believed in my dream but I eventually started giving up. My mother sent my CV to the SAPS but I didn't go for the interview. The day of the interview I knew I was struggling but I couldn't go through with it," K.O was quoted saying in the Sowetan.

== Music career ==
=== 2004–2009: Teargas ===
In 2004, while he was employed in Public Relations, K.O, Ma-E and Ntukza formed a hip hop group called Teargas. In 2005, Teargas signed with Electromode Music. "We realised it would be better to join since we were already good friends who knew each other's rhyming style", K.O was quoted by News24.

In 2006, Teargas released their debut album, K'shubile K'bovu. The album was very successful. The fifteen-track album featured "Chance", a hip hop song chronicling a life of a township gangster seeking redemption, reminiscent of the early days of Kwaito.

In 2008, Teargas released their second studio album, Wafa Wafa. In the sixteen-track album, the group worked with Bongo Riot on two songs, "Champions" and "Sunshine".

In 2009, they released their third studio album, Dark or Blue. In the thirteen-track album, Teargas collaborated with Tamarsha on the song titled "Life", with DJ Tira and Liesl Penniken on the song titled "Party 101", with Hip Hop Pantsula and Pro on the song "Goodfellaz" and with Danny K on the song "T.L.C. (Tender, Love and Care)".

In 2012, Teargas released their fourth and final studio album, called Number Number (stylized Num8er Num8er). In the fifteen-track album, they worked with 2Face on "Turning Tables", with Lilly Million on "Forgive Me", with Toya Delazy on "Paradise" and Ziyon on "Put U On".

In an interview with the Sunday World K.O dismissed claims that Teargas split: "We have decided to individually try new things just like Mafikizolo did. We are taking a break but it does not mean we are a dead group."

=== 2013–2015: Skhanda Republic ===
In 2013, K.O joined forces with Teargas bandmate Ma-E and music and marketing executive Thabiso Khati to form an entertainment company, Cashtime Life. K.O became its first artist.

In 2014, K.O was featured on AKA's single "Run Jozi (Godly)". The verse by K.O was ranked as one of the greatest verses in South African hip hop.

In March 2014, he released a second single from his debut studio album, "Caracara", and it garnered over one million views on YouTube. "Caracara" won Record of the Year and Best Collaboration at the 20th annual ceremony of South African Music Awards. In addition, "Caracara" was nominated for Best Hit Single, Best Collaboration and Best Music Video at the 14th Annual Metro FM Awards.

K.O later released "Son of a Gun", a third single from his first album.

In November 2014, K.O's first solo album, Skhanda Republic, was released. Skhanda Republic was nominated for Male artist of the Year and Album of the Year, and won Best Rap Album at 20th ceremony of South African Music Awards. In addition, Skhanda Republic was nominated for Best Hip Hop Album and Best Male Album at the 14th Annual Metro FM Awards.

K.O won the MTV Base MC of the year crown in November 2014.

=== 2016–2019: SR2, PTY UnLTD ===
In July 2017, Ntokozo signed a partnership and distribution with Sony Entertainment. He released his single "No Feelings" on 21 July. Production was handled by Hylton Brooker and Gemini Major. The song was certified platinum, with sales of 25,000 copies. He released a single, "Don Dada", featuring Okmalumkoolkat, on 14 October.

Ntokozo released his second album, Skhanda Republic 2, in October 2017. In March 2019, his single "Supa Dupa" was released as his third album's lead single. The song was certified 2× gold, with sales of 20,000 copies. "Say U Will" was released as the second single. He followed up with his third solo album, titled PTY UnLTD, in 2019.

"Supa Dupa" was the only South African hip hop song to receive a gold plaque in 2019.

=== 2021–2023: Skhanda Republic 3 ===
In September 2021, he announced his fourth album, Skhanda Republic 3, and released "Playback" on October 15, 2021.

The second single, "Emoyeni", was released on March 25, 2022.

His single "SETE" featuring Young Stunna and Blxckie was released on 22 August 2022, along with a music video. The song debuted at number one on Radio Monitor Charts and remained there for 19 consecutive weeks, became the longest-charting single. It also entered Local and International Radio Chart Top 10 at number 1. In addition, "SETE" was number 1 on Official SA Charts list of SA's most streamed songs of 2022.

The song was certified Multi-Platinum by the Recording Industry of South Africa.

His fourth studio album, Skhanda Republic 3, was released on 16 September 2022. It features Sjava, Msaki, Zuma, Pabi Cooper and Sarkodie.

Upon its release the album debuted at number one on Spotify Weekly Top Albums SA Chart and was certified platinum by RISA.

=== 2024–present: Upcoming album ===
His single "Too Much" with Nasty C was released on 15 August 2024. It debuted at number 10 on Local Streaming Charts.

In August 2024, K.O announced his fifth studio album, I Think You Spoke Too Soon, set to be released on October 18. On October 16 2024, K.O took to Instagram to announce that he has decided to push his album to the first quarter of 2025. As of May 2025, the album has not been released.

K.O's new album, titled "Phara City" is scheduled to be released on June 13th, 2025.

== Personal life ==
In May 2014, K.O lost a significant amount of weight. Rumours appeared on social media that K.O was HIV-positive. His manager, Thabiso Khati, denied those rumours, stating that K.O had undergone a strict diet plan and was exercising regularly. K.O later released a statement regarding his health and posted a picture of his blood test results on his Twitter and Instagram pages showing that he was HIV negative.

== Awards and nominations ==
=== Channel O Africa Music Video Awards ===
Year	Nominee / work	Award	Result	Ref
2014	"Caracara"	Most Gifted Male	Nominated	
2014	"Caracara"	Most Gifted Duo/Group or Featuring Artist	Nominated	
2014	"Caracara"	Most Gifted Hip Hop	Nominated	
2014	"Caracara"	Most Gifted Southern Artist	Nominated	
2014	"Caracara"	Most Gifted Video of the Year	Nominated	

=== South African Music Awards ===
Year	Nominee / work	Award	Result
2015	"Skhanda Republic"	Record of The Year ("Caracara")	Won
2015	"Skhanda Republic"	Rap Album of The Year	Won
2015	"Skhanda Republic"	Best Collaboration ("Caracara" ft Kid X)	Won
2020	"PtyUnltd"	Record of The Year ("Supa Dupa")	Nominated
2020	"PtyUnltd"	Rap Album of The Year	Nominated
2020	"PtyUnltd"	Best Collaboration ("Say You Will ft Nandi Madida")	Won
2021	"Lucky Star"	Best Produced Music Video	Nominated
2023	SR3	Male Artist of the Year	Nominated
2023	SR3	Album of the Year	Nominated
2023	"SETE" featuring Young Stunna, Blxckie	Best Collaboration	Nominated
2023	"SETE" featuring Young Stunna, Blxckie	Best Produced Music Video	Nominated
2023	"SETE" featuring Young Stunna, Blxckie	SAMRO Highest AirPlay Composer	Won
2023	"SETE" featuring Young Stunna, Blxckie	CAPASSO Most Streamed Song	Won
2023	"SETE" featuring Young Stunna, Oxlade and Diamond Platnumz	Remix of the Year	Nominated

=== AFRICAN NTUZUMO NONGOMA / PROD'S South African Hip Hop Awards ===
Year	Nominee / work	Award	Result	Ref.
2022	"SETE"	Best Video	Won	
2022	"SETE"	Best Collaboration	Won	
2022	"SETE"	Song of the Year	Won	

=== Metro FM Music Awards ===
K.O leads the 2023 Metro FM Music Awards nomination list with 7 nominations.
Year	Category	Recipient/Nominated work	Results	Ref.
2023	Song of the Year	"SETE"	Nominated	
2023	Artist of the Year	"SETE"	Nominated	
2023	Best Hip Hop Artist	"SETE"	Nominated	
2023	Best Male Artist	"SETE"	Nominated	
2023	Best Music Video	"SETE"	Nominated	
2023	Best Collaboration Song	"SETE"	Nominated	
2023	Best Viral Challenge	"SETE"	Nominated	

== Discography ==
=== Studio albums ===
- Skhanda Republic (2014)
- Skhanda Republic 2 (2017)
- PTY UnLTD (2019)
- Skhanda Republic 3 (2022)
- Phara City (2025)

=== Extended plays ===
- 2Piece (2018)

=== As member of Teargas ===
- Teargas Mixtape (2005)

K'shubile K'bovu (2006)

- Wafa Wafa (2008)
- Dark or Blue (2009)
- Num8er Num8er (2012)

== Singles ==
=== As lead artist ===
List of singles as lead artist, with selected chart positions and certifications, showing year released and album name
Title	Year	Peak chart positions	Certifications	Album
Title	Year	ZA	Certifications	Album
"Caracara" (featuring KiD X)	2014	6		Skhanda Republic
"Say You Will" (featuring Nandi Madida)	2019			PTY Unltd
"Supa Dupa"	2019	1		PTY Unltd
"Lucky Star"	2021			Non-album singles
"K:HOVA"	2021			Non-album single
"Playback"	2021			Non-album single
"Emoyeni"	2022			Non-album single
"SKHANDAVILLE (Freestyle)"	2022			SR3
"Omega (Freestyle)"	2022			Non-album single
"SETE" (featuring Young Stunna and Blxckie)	2022	1	RISA: 3× Platinum	SR3
"Rockabye" (featuring Toss)	2023			Non-album single
"Y.O.U."	2024	—		Non-album single
"Let Me Cook" (featuring Maglera Doe Boy)	2024	—		Non-album single
"Electra"	2024	—		Non-album single
"On The Way (From "Losing Lerato 2")"	2024	—		Non-album single
"Too Much" (K.O, Nasty C)	2024	10		Non-album single
"We are K.O"	2024	—		Non-album single
"King Size" (K.O, AKA)	2024	—		Non-album single
"—" denotes a recording that did not chart or was not released in that territory.

=== As featured artist ===
List of singles as featured artist, with selected chart positions and certifications, showing year released and album name
Title	Year	Peak chart positions	Certifications	Album
Title	Year	ZA	Certifications	Album
"God's Will" (DJ Vigilante featuring AKA & K.O)	2013	—		
"Nobody But Me" (Vanesse Mdee featuring K.O)	2015	—		Non-album single
"Kabelai (Pucado featuring Wizkid, K.O)	2015	—		
"Money" (Ryki feat. K.O)	2018	—		
"iWalk Ye Phara" (DJ Maphorisa, DJ Raybel featuring Moonchild Sanelly, K.O, Zulu Mkhathini)	2018	—		
"Pasop! (DJ Vigilante feat. K.O, Maggz, Moozlie, MA-E, Kid X)	2019	—		
"Bang Out" (DJ Vigilante featuring AKA, K.O, Nasty C)	2019	—		Non-album single
"Killa Combo" (Skhanda World featuring K.O, Tellaman, Zingah, Mariechan, Loki.)	2020	—		
"Section (Loki. featuring K.O)	2020	—		
"Navigator" (MA-E featuring K.O)	2020	—		
"Cold Summer" (Skhandaworld featuring K.O, Loki., Roiii, Kwesta)	2020	—		
"Mshimane 2.0" (Stini Le Thwenny featuring K.O, Major League Djz, Khuli Chana)	2021	—		
"Asambe" (DJ Mr X featuring K.O, Cassper Nyovest, Loki., Roiii)	2021	—		
"Dear My Love" (Big Zulu featuring K.O, Siya Ntuli & Xowla)	2022	—		
"Isitha" (Skhandaworld featuring Aymos, K.O, Loki., Roiii)	2023	—		
"Namhlanje" (Xowla featuring K.O)	2024	—		Non-album single
"—" denotes a recording that did not chart or was not released in that territory.
