= Prince Kaybee =

South African DJ and record producer

- Born: Kabelo Motsamai; June 15, 1989 (age 37); Senekal, Free State, South Africa
- Genres: Afro-house; afro-tech
- Occupations: DJ; record producer
- Instrument: Piano
- Labels: Universal; PLAYY.

Kabelo Motsamai (born 15 June 1989), professionally known Prince Kaybee is a South African DJ and record producer.

== Career ==
Shortly after he dropped out at school in Grade 11, Kaybee relocated to Bloemfontein and got a club DJ gig. Kaybee rose to prominence after contested on second season of the SABC1 reality competition 1's and 2's, and won, in 2015. Following year, he received his first nomination for Listener's Choice at the 6th ceremony of MTV Africa Music Awards.

His single "Charlotte" featuring Lady Zamar was released on 4 November 2016.

"Club Controller" with LaSoul Mates featuring TNS, Zanda Zakuza was released on 19 January 2018. It peaked at number 1 on Channel O Top 30 Charts. In addition, the song was certified 6× platinum in South Africa with over 120 000 units sold.

In September 2018, Kaybee bagged a role on a television show 1's and 2's, as resident judge for season 18.

His single "Banomoya" featuring Busiswa, TNS was released on 31 August 2018. The song charted number 1 on Channel O Top 30 Charts. In addition the "Banomoya" won song of the year on Ukhozi FM and certified 4× platinum in South Africa.

His second studio album Re Mmino was released on 8 March 2019. The album was certified Platinum in South Africa.

Kaybee received the most nominations at the 26th ceremony of South African Music Awards for Music Video of the Year and Record of Year, both songs nominated for two categories "Gugulethu" and "Fetch Your Life". In addition, Kaybee was nominated for Best Music Video and won Best House Record at the 2019 Dance Music Awards South Africa.

His single "Uwrongo" with guest appearances from Shimza, Black Motion and Ami Faku was released on 31 January 2020. The song debuted number 1 on the Radiomonitor Top 100 AirPlay Chart for 26 consecutive weeks.

In February 2021, Kaybee was featured on Rhythms of Zamunda: Music Inspired By Coming 2 America by Def Jam Africa released on March 15, 2021.

Project Hope (Season 1) was released on 2 October 2020. It incorporated the elements of rnb, afro-house and, amapiano.

In early February 2021, Kaybee announced his fourth studio album via Instagram.

The 4th Republic, was released on March 5, 2021.

Kaybee fifth studio album Gemini, was released on 17 June 2022. It was supported by four singles "Zimbali", "Sbindi Uyabulala", "Tayari", "Breakfast in Soweto".

Three singles "Amaphiko Ezono", "Inkubulo" featuring Azana, and "Oh boy" featuring Start Healers were released on June 4, 2023, as albums lead singles.

In June 2026, Prince Kaybee signed a recording deal with PLAYY. Records and announced upcoming single, "Heno Babayo" scheduled for release on 26 June.

== Controversies ==
Botlhale Phora, a former SA Idols star, accused Prince Kaybee of stealing his song in 2024, claiming to have sent the song to him in 2021.It was not for the first time, as he was accused of the same thing in 2020 by another artist.

== Discography ==
=== Studio albums ===
- I Am Music (2017)
- Re Mmino (2019)
- Project Hope (Season 1) (2020)
- The 4th Republic (2021)
- Gemini (2022)
- Music Theory (2023)

== Achievements ==
=== South African Music Awards ===
Year	Nominee / work	Award	Result	Ref.
2020	Re Mmino	Male Artist of the Year	Won	
