= Cashtime Life =

Former music publishing and entertainment company in South Africa

Cashtime
- Founder: K.O and Ma-E
- Defunct: 2018
- Genre: Various
- Country of origin: South Africa
- Location: Johannesburg

CashTime Life was a South African Music Publishing Company and Entertainment Company, as well as a record label and Management Service. The CashTime Fam was a South African hip hop collective, consisted of South African hip hop musicians, performers and entertainers K.O, Ma-E, Maggz, Kid X, Smashis, AB Crazy and Ntukza.

== Roster ==
=== Current roster ===
- (CashTime is No Longer Active)

=== Former acts ===
- K.O
- Ma-E
- Maggz
- AB Crazy
- Ntukza
- Zingah
- Nomuzi a.k.a. Moozlie
- Michamelo
- KiD X
- zandie_buthelezi
- andi
- AirDee

== Full Discography ==
=== Compilation albums ===
Year	Artist	Album title	Album details	Certification	Sales
2006	Teargas	K'shubile K'bovu	Released: July 6, 2006; Label: Electrode; Formats: CD, digital download	RiSA: Gold	South Africa: +25,000
2008	Teargas	Wafa Wafa	Released: March 23, 2008; Label: Electrode; Formats: CD, digital download		
2009	Teargas	Dark or Blue	Released: November 11, 2009; Label: Electrode; Formats: CD, digital download	RiSA: Gold	South Africa: +20,000
2011	Cashtime Fam	Now or Never	Released: October 13, 2011; Label: Electrode; Formats: CD, digital download		
2012	Teargas	Num8er Num8er	Released: August 22, 2012; Label: Electrode; Formats: CD, digital download		

=== Solo studio albums ===
Year	Artist	Album title	Album details	Certification	Sales
2013	K.O.	Skhanda Republic	Released: November 7, 2014; Label: Cashtime Life, Electrode; Formats: CD, digital download	RISA: Platinum	South Africa: + 40,000
2016	Ma-E	Township Counsellor	Released: March 28, 2016; Label: Cashtime Life; Formats: CD, digital download		

=== Mixtapes ===
Year	Artist	Album title	Album details	Downloads
2013	Cashtime Fam	Cashtime R.A.D.I.O	Released: March, 2013; Label: Cashtime Life; Formats: Digital download	
2015	KiD X	3 Quarter Pace	Released: October, 2015; Label: Cashtime Life; Formats: Digital download	+600,000

== Nomuzi's Departure ==
Cashtime Life CEO Thabiso Khati announced in March 2016 that artist Nomuzi Mabena otherwise known as Moozlie, was no longer part of the Cashtime Roster. It was said that due to the differences between Nomuzi's vision and the label's vision for her development in her music career, the label opted to release her from her contract. Nomuzi departed on good terms with the label.
