= De Mthuda =

South African record producer and DJ

- Born: Mthuthuzeli Gift Khoza; Vosloorus, South Africa
- Origin: Gauteng, South Africa
- Genre: Amapiano
- Occupations: Record producer; DJ
- Instruments: Piano, keyboard, vocals
- Years active: 2018–present

Mthuthuzeli Gift Khoza, known commonly by his stage name De Mthuda, is a South African record producer and DJ. He is best known for his singles "Shesha Geza" and "John Wick".

== Early life and career ==
De Mthuda was born in Vosloorus, Johannesburg. He started producing music in 2010 when he was still in high school and eventually dropped out while he was in Grade 11 to his pursue his music career.

In May 2019, he released the single "Shesha Geza". The song was certified gold by RiSA and nominated for Record of the year at the 26th South African Music Awards.

In November 2020, he released the album Ace of Spades. The album was nominated for Amapiano album of the year at the South African Amapiano Awards.

In October 2021, he released the album The Landlord. The album features amapiano musicians Sir Trill, Daliwonga, Kabza De Small, Focalistic, Njelic, Da Muziqal Chef and Malumnator.

== Discography ==
- Ace of Spades (with Ntokzin) (2020)
- The Landlord (2021)
- Story To Tell: Vol.2 (2022)
- Sgudi Sync (with Da Muziqal Chef) (2023)
- Baba Yaga (2024)

== Awards and nominations ==
Year	Award ceremony	Prize	Result
2019	Dance Music Awards South Africa	Best Amapiano Record	Nominated
2020	South African Music Awards	Record of the Year	Nominated
2021	South African Amapiano Awards	Best amapiano music producer	Nominated
2021	South African Amapiano Awards	Best amapiano produced song	Nominated
2021	South African Amapiano Awards	Best album of the Year	Nominated
2022	2022 DStv Mzansi Viewers' Choice Awards	Favourite DJ	Nominated
