= Sibusiso Mashiloane =

South African jazz musician

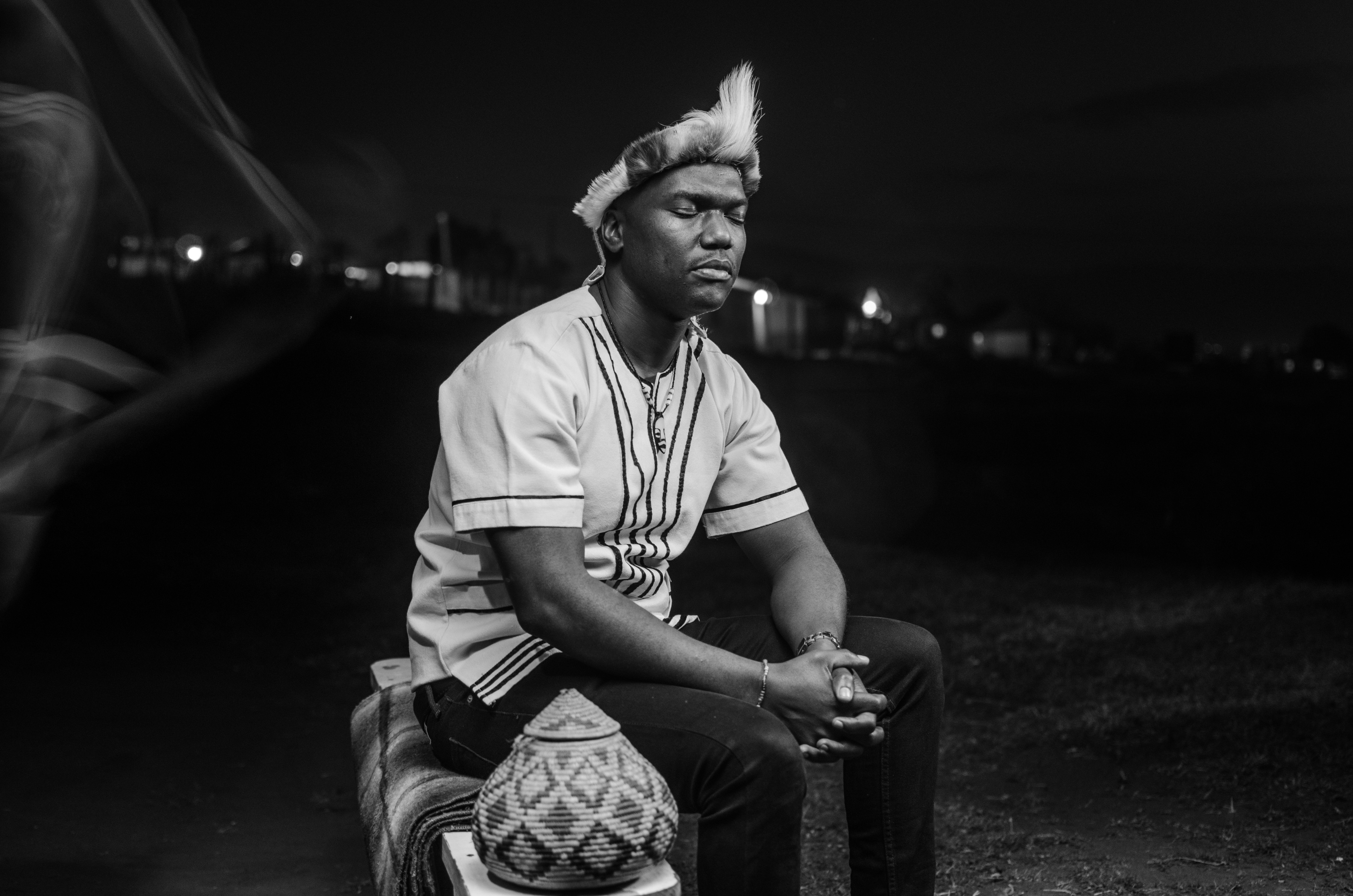

Background information
- Birth name: Sibusiso Joseph Mashiloane
- Also known as: Sibusiso Mash Mashiloane
- Born: 26 May 1984; Bethal, South Africa
- Genres: South African jazz
- Occupation(s): Musician, composer, educator
- Instrument: Piano
- Years active: 2002–present
- Website: sibumash.com

Sibusiso Mash Mashiloane (26 May 1984) is a South African jazz musician. He is a pianist, composer, educator, arranger and award winner who studied jazz at the University of KwaZulu-Natal.

== Biography ==
Mashiloane was born in Bethal. He started playing music in church and went on to study music professionally. He has a Masters in Jazz Performance and graduated from the University of KwaZulu-Natal. His albums include Amanz' Olwandle (2016) and Rotha – A Tribute to Mama (2017). Amanz' Olwandle won two Mzantsi Jazz Awards for Best Jazz album. Rotha was nominated for the Afrima Awards for best Best African Jazz. He lectures at the University of KwaZulu-Natal and Durban Music School. His intent is to teach and organize live music performances with his students, focusing on South African composers.

== Discography ==
- Amanz' Olwandle - 2016
- Rotha - A Tribute to Mama - 2017
- Closer to Home - 2018
- Amanzi Nemifula : Umkhuleko - 2020
- Ihubo Labomdabu - 2021
- Music from my People - 2022
- Izibongo - 2023

== Awards ==
- Amanz' Olwandle – Mzantsi Jazz Awards 2017– 2 Awards for Best Jazz Album, public vote and jury.
- Rotha - All Africa Music Awards 2018 – nominated for Best African Jazz and Best Male in Southern Africa.
