= Maggz =

South African rapper

- Born: Gift Magubane; Pimville, Soweto, South Africa
- Occupations: Rapper; singer; songwriter; record producer; composer
- Years active: 2006–present
- Known for: His time at Cashtime Life
- Musical career
- Also known as: Maggz Paraffin
- Genres: Hip Hop; Kwaito
- Labels: Cashtime Life (former); Mabala Noise
- Website: twitter.com/Maggz100

Gift Magubane, professionally known as Maggz is a South African rapper known for his time with Cashtime Life when Hip-hop music was at its peak in South Africa, and for his guest appearances on Da L.E.S's "Heaven" and "Real Stuff" alongside AKA.

The rapper went on a music hiatus, and was facing legal charges that nearly landed him 15 years in prison because of Bongani Fassie.
