= Blxckie =

South African rapper and singer (born 1999)

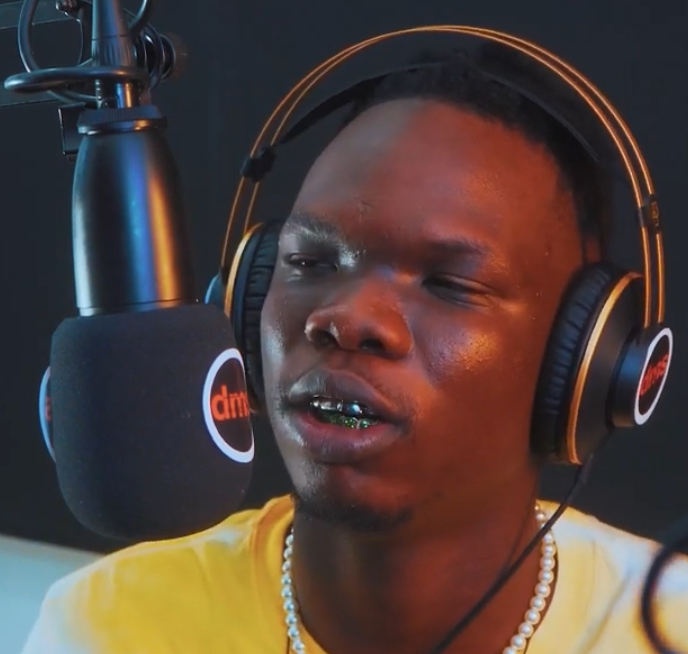
- Blxckie in 2021
- Born: Sihle Philmon Sithole; 24 November 1999 (age 26); Sydenham Heights, Durban, South Africa
- Other names: Somnyama, King Bhuxuza, Blxckie Somnyama the man. Yena Yedwa
- Education: University of KwaZulu-Natal
- Occupations: Rapper; songwriter; singer; record producer
- Children: 1
- Musical career
- Genres: Hip hop; trap
- Labels: M4 Entertainment; CCA; Taylor Records; Def Jam
- Website: blxckie.com

Sihle Sithole (born 24 November 1999), known professionally as Blxckie, is a South African rapper, singer, songwriter and record producer from Sydenham Heights, Durban. His debut studio album B4Now (2021) was certified gold in South Africa.

== Early and personal life ==
Sihle Sithole was born on 24 November 1999 in Sydenham Heights, Durban, South Africa. His musical interest started at the age of 6 when he recorded music with his friends.

Sithole enrolled at the University of KwaZulu-Natal with a degree in Psychology, but failed to graduate during the lockdown during the COVID-19 pandemic.

In September 2024 Blxckie had his first daughter.

== Career ==
In March 2020, he was named Up Next artist by Apple Music. On 30 April 2021, his single "David" was released. The song was certified gold in South Africa.

On 14 May 2021, he released the single "Ye ×4" featuring Nasty C; it was certified double platinum with sales of over 40,000 units. His debut studio album B4Now was released on 21 May 2021. It features appearances from artists such as Nasty C, LucasRaps, FLVME, Rowlene, and LeoDaleo. The album was certified gold in South Africa with sales of over 10,000 units.

Blxckie embarked on his B4Now Tour on 26 November, kicking off in his home city of Durban at The Warehouse and including 10 dates that ran through to December 2021. He won Freshman of the Year and was nominated for Album of the Year (B4Now), Song of the Year ("Ye×4") and Best Collaboration at the South African Hip Hop Awards 2021.

In December 2021, he ranked number 1 on MTV Base: SA's Hottest MCs. "Cold" was released as his new EP's lead single on 3 February 2022. On 18 February 2022, his EP 4LUV was released.

In November 2023, Blxckie signed a recording deal with Def Jam. Towards the end of February 2024, he was announced as supporting act on the We Only Talk About Real Shit When We're Fucked Up Tour with Bas, commerced on 3 March in Dallas, Texas, and concluded in New York on 9 April. His extended play see u soon, was released on 26 July 2024.

== Discography ==
=== Studio albums ===
Title	Type	Album details	Certification
B4Now	Studio album	Release date: 21 May 2021; Label: M4 Entertainment; Formats: Digital download	Gold

=== Extended plays ===
Title	Type	Album details	Certification
Eqnx II	EP	Release date: 2019; Label: CCA; Formats: Digital download, Streaming	
It Feels Like a Dream	EP	Release date: 2020; Label: Blxckie; Formats: Digital download, Streaming	
Blxck Panda (with Khumz)	EP	Release date: 2020; Label: Taylor Records; Formats: Digital download, Streaming	
4LUV	EP	Release date: 18 February 2022; Label: M4 Entertainment; Formats: Digital Download, Streaming	
The 4Mula	EP	Release date: 2022; Label: Taylor Records; Formats: Digital download, Streaming	
see u soon	EP	Released: 26 July 2024; Label: Def Jam; Formats: Digital download, Streaming	

=== As featured artist ===
List of singles as featured artist, with selected chart positions and certifications, showing year released and album name
Title	Year	Peak chart positions	Certifications	Album
Title	Year	ZA	Certifications	Album
"Sete" (K.O featuring Blxckie and Young Stunna)	2022	1	2× Platinum	SR3
"Slow Down"( Holly Rey featuring Blxckie)	2023	—		Non–Album single
"—" denotes a recording that did not chart or was not released in that territory.

== Awards and nominations ==
=== BET Hip-Hop Awards ===
Year	Nominee / work	Award	Result	Ref.
2024	Himself	Best International Flow	Pending	

=== BET UK Hip Hop Awards ===
Year	Nominee / work	Award	Result	Ref.
2022	Himself	Best International Flow	Nominated	

=== Clout Africa Awards ===
Year	Nominee / work	Award	Result	Ref.
2022	Himself	Songwriter of the Year	Won	

=== South African Hip hop Awards ===
Year	Nominee / work	Award	Result	Ref.
2021	B4Now	Fresheman of the Year	Won	
2021	B4Now	Album of the Year	Nominated	
2022	B4Now	Best Hip Hop Album	Won	
