= List of Zulu people =

This is a list of notable Zulu people.

== Kings, Chiefs, princes and princesses ==
- King Zulu kaMalandela, founder of the Zulu clan
- King Shaka kaSenzangakhona, founder of the Zulu Nation
- King Goodwill Zwelithini kaBhekuzulu, Zulu king
- King Senzangakhona kaJama, Zulu king and father of Shaka
- Mcwayizeni Zulu, Zulu prince
- Mkabayi kaJama, Zulu princess and sister of Senzangakhona
- Nandi, Mhlongo princess and mother of Shaka
- Magogo kaDinuzulu, Zulu princess and mother of Mangosuthu Buthelezi
- Nomusa kaBhekuzulu, Zulu princess, Regent Queen of AmaRharhabe and sister of Zwelithini
- Mangosuthu Buthelezi, Buthelezi prince
- Bhambatha kaMancinza, Zulu chief
- Dabulamanzi kaMpande, Zulu commander
- Dingiswayo, Mthethwa chief, mentor of Shaka Zulu
- Albert Lutuli, chief of Zulu Christian
- Langa KaXaba, the Ndwandwe, king nation
- Matshobana KaMangete, the chief of the Northern Khumalo
- Sigananda kaSokufa, Zulu aristocrat
- Zwangendaba, Shaka's general
- Zwide kaLanga, the Ndwandwe king nation
- Ntshingwayo Khoza, InDuna of Khoza
- Umhlangana kaSenzangakhona, Zulu prince
- Ndlela kaSompisi, InDuna for Shaka and Dingaan
- Nongalaza KaNondela, inDuna for Mpande
- Zibhebhu kaMaphitha, Zulu chief
- Mbongeleni Zondi, Zulu chief and great-grandson of Inkosi Bambatha kaMancinza
- Nothando Dube as known as Inkhosikati LaDube, member of the House of Dlamini as the twelfth wife of King Mswati III of Eswatini

== Politicians and activists ==
- Edward Bhengu, founder member of the PAC
- Sibusiso Bengu, Minister of Education, ambassador to Germany
- Mangosuthu Buthelezi, founder and first president of the Inkatha Freedom Party
- Bheki Cele, former national S.A. police commissioner and police minister
- Siyabonga Cwele, former minister of communication; intelligence service; state security; home affairs
- Thoko Didiza, former Minister of Agriculture and Land Affairs and Minister of Agriculture, Land Reform and Rural Development
- Jackson Mthembu, former Minister in the Presidency
- Bathabile Dlamini, ANC Women's League leader
- Nkosazana Clarice Dlamini-Zuma, chairperson of the African Union Commission
- John Langalibalele Dube, first president of the African National Congress, founder of the Ohlange Institute, educator
- Nokutela Dube, wife of John L. Dube, founder of the Ohlange Institute
- Malusi Gigaba, Minister of Home Affairs
- Archie Gumede, lawyer, politician, activist
- Josiah Tshangana Gumede, politician and father of Archie Gumede
- Zandile Gumede, former Mayor of Durban
- Harry Gwala, ANC and communist activist
- Nkululeko Gwala, political activist
- Princess Constance Magogo Sibilile Mantithi Ngangezinye kaDinuzulu, Zulu princess, ethnomusicologist and composer
- Velenkosini Hlabisa, Inkatha Freedom Party leader
- Mbali Ntuli, member of the Democratic Alliance
- Mxolisi Kaunda, Mayor of Durban
- Makoti Khawula, EFF Member of Parliament and former anti-apartheid activist
- Ntombikayise Priscilla Khubeka, anti-apartheid activist
- Duma Kumalo, South African human rights activist and one of the Sharpeville Six
- Dumisani Kumalo, South African politician
- Ellen Kuzwayo, political activist
- Anton Lembede, political activist
- Chief Albert Luthuli, President of the African National Congress and first South African Nobel Peace Prize laureate
- Zanele kaMagwaza-Msibi, Deputy Minister of Science and Technology, founder of the National Freedom Party (splinter from the IFP)
- Moses Mabhida, political activist
- Nozizwe Charlotte Madlala-Routledge, South African politician, former Deputy Minister of Defence and former Deputy Minister of Health
- Amos Masondo, Chairperson of the National Council of Provinces
- Veronica Mate-Sobukwe, political activist and wife of Robert Sobukwe
- Joseph Mathunjwa, trade union leader and the head of the Association of Mineworkers and Construction Union (AMCU)
- Lindiwe Mazibuko, South African politician and musician
- Seth Mazibuko, political activist
- Tryphina Mboxela Jokweni, political activist
- Senzo Mchunu, former premier of KwaZulu-Natal
- Willies Mchunu, former premier of KwaZulu-Natal
- Bandile Mdlalose, 2014 general secretary of the South African shackdwellers' movement Abahlali baseMjondolo
- Frank Mdlalose, first former premier of KwaZulu-Natal
- Richard Mdluli, former head of Police Crime Intelligence
- Bertha Mkhize, political activist
- Florence Mkhize, political activist
- Nomhlangano Beauty Mkhize, South African activist, politician, shop steward and wife to late Saul Mkhize
- Zweli Mkhize, former premier of KwaZulu-Natal and former treasure of ANC
- Obed Mlaba, former mayor of Durban
- Johnson Mlambo, revolutionary
- Phumzile Mlambo-Ngcuka, first female deputy president of South Africa (2005-2008)
- Zwakele Mncwango, former Leader of the Opposition in the KwaZulu-Natal Legislature
- James Mpanza, political activist
- Saul Msane, South African politician and intellectual
- Bongani Msomi, UDM secretary
- Ricardo Mthembu, political activist
- Nathi Mthethwa, Minister of Arts and Culture
- Eric Mtshali, political activist
- Siphiwe Mvuyane, IFP member and police officer
- Sibusiso Ndebele, former Minister of Correctional Services, former premier of KwaZulu-Natal
- Phila Portia Ndwandwe, anti-apartheid activist
- Chris Ngcobo, former head of Police Intelligence
- Sipho Ngwenya, political activist
- Ben Ngubane, former chair of the South African Broadcasting Corporation, and former premier of KwaZulu-Natal
- Mxolisi Nxasana, Director of Public Prosecutions in South Africa
- Sizwe Nxasana, South African businessman
- Mzala Nxumalo, political activist
- Dorothy Nyembe, political activist
- Blade Nzimande, Minister of Higher Education
- Nqobile Nzuza, resident in the Marikana Land Occupation
- Jeff Radebe, Minister in the Presidency for Planning, Performance, Monitoring, Evaluation and Administration
- Pixley ka Isaka Seme, founder of the African National Congress and first black lawyer in South Africa
- Sihle Zikalala, premier of KwaZulu-Natal
- S'bu Zikode, co-founder of Abahlali baseMjondolo
- Andrew Zondo, former Umkhonto we Sizwe activist
- Lindiwe Zulu, South Africa's Minister of Small Business Development
- Jacob Zuma, former president of the Republic of South Africa

== Religion leaders ==
- Nicholas Bhengu, Assemblies of God founder
- John L. Dube, Christian preacher
- Smangaliso Mkhatshwa, Catholic priest
- Saul Msane, Wesleyan Methodist Church member
- Vusamazulu Credo Mutwa, Zulu traditional healer
- Selby Mvusi, theologian and artist
- Isaiah Shembe, Nazareth Baptist Church founder

== Business and professional figures ==
- Robert Gumede
- Khanyi Dhlomo, TV host and the founder and CEO of Ndalo Media and Ndalo Luxury Ventures
- Sizwe Nxasana, former CEO of First Rand, Telkom (South Africa) & former chairman of NSFAS.
- Phuthuma Nhleko, former CEO of the MTN Group
- Nonkululeko Nyembezi-Heita, CEO of the Dutch mining group, IchorCoal N.V., CEO of the JSE Limited & Chairperson of Alexander Forbes
- Duduzane Zuma, businessman and son of Jacob Zuma
- Khulubuse Zuma, businessman and nephew of Jacob Zuma

== Academics, educators, and writers ==
- Zodwa Dlamini, biochemist
- Zodwa Dlamini, scientist
- Herbert Isaac Ernest Dhlomo, author, educator
- Rolfes Robert Reginald Dhlomo, author
- Nokutela Dube, educator, Christian preacher
- Magema Magwaza Fuze, author
- Mafika Gwala, poet, editor
- John Hlophe, judge president of the Western Division
- Bheki W. J. Langa, diplomat
- Mandla Langa, poet
- Pius Langa, former chief justice
- Sizwe Mabizela, vice-chancellor of Rhodes University
- Tholie Madala, judge in the Constitutional Court of South Africa
- Dunstan Mlambo, judge president of the Gauteng Division of the High Court of South Africa
- Oswald Mbuyiseni Mtshali, author
- Vusamazulu Credo Mutwa, author and Zulu traditional healer
- Njabulo Ndebele, former Vice Chancellor of the University of Cape Town, writer
- Sandile Ngcobo, former chief justice
- Lewis Nkosi, South African writer
- Mxolisi Nxasana, former National Prosecuting Authority director
- Henry Nxumalo, investigating journalist
- Sibusiso Nyembezi, Zulu writer, novelist, poetry and scholar
- Menzi Simelane, former National Prosecuting Authority director
- Benedict Wallet Vilakazi, poet and novelist
- Raymond Zondo, Deputy Chief Justice of South Africa

== Actors, TV & radio personalities ==
- Thembinkosi Mthembu, actor
- Dumisani Dlamini, actor
- Baby Cele, actress
- Henry Cele, actor
- Pallance Dladla, actor
- Minnie Dlamini-Jones, on-air personality, actress and model
- Sweet Guluva, singer, actor and television personality
- Gugu Gumede, actress
- Kelly Khumalo, singer and actress
- Leleti Khumalo, actress
- Siyabonga Thwala, actor
- Hamilton Dhlamini, actor
- Sindi Dlathu, actress, singer and producer
- Ayanda Borotho, actress
- Themba Ndaba, actor
- Linda Mtoba, actress
- Celeste Ntuli, actress and comedian
- Dawn Thandeka King, actress
- Vusi Kunene, actor
- Khaya Dladla, actor
- Nandi Madida, actress
- Mandla Maseko, aviator
- Bridget Masinga, 2002 Miss South Africa 2nd princess, actress, businesswoman
- Gugu Mbatha-Raw, actress
- Nomzamo Mbatha, actress and model
- Zamani Mbatha, actor
- Hope Mbhele, actress and television presenter
- Nomonde Mbusi, actress
- Ndaba Mhlongo, actor
- Somizi Mhlongo, actor
- Gcina Mhlophe, actress, storyteller, poet and politician
- Bafana Mlangeni, actor
- Don Eric Mlangeni, actor
- Roland Mqwebu, actor
- Masoja Msiza, actor
- Siphesihle Ndaba, actress
- Duma Ndlovu, filmmaker, playwright, director and screenwriter
- Mbongeni Ngema, writer, lyricist, composer, director and theatre producer
- Shadrack Ngema, actor and sport commentator
- Menzi Ngubane, actor
- Mimi Ndiweni, actress
- Jessica Nkosi, actress
- Lindani Nkosi, actor
- Lalela Mswane, Miss South Africa 2021
- Winnie Ntshaba, actress
- Nandi Nyembe, actress
- Lerato Nxumalo, actress
- Lunga Shabalala, actor and television personality
- Sjava, actor and musician
- Siyabonga Shibe, actor
- Linda Sibiya, radio host, radio producer, DJ, television producer, television host and broadcaster
- Linda Sokhulu, actress
- Ayanda Gugulethu Thabethe, television presenter and beauty pageant titleholder
- Ayanda Thabethe, television presenter
- Thando Thabethe, actress, radio and television personality
- Pearl Thusi, actress, model, radio, and television personality
- Mary Twala, actress
- Thishiwe Ziqubu, actress
- Eddie Zondi, radio personality and music composer
- Luyanda Zuma, actress and beauty pageant titleholder
- Luyanda Zwane, actress
- Thandeka Zulu, actress
- Zuluboy, actor
- Ntokozo Dlamini, actor
- Gugulethu Zuma-Ncube, actress and producer

== Sport figures ==
- Makhosonke Bhengu, footballer
- Phumelele Bhengu, footballer
- Bafo Biyela, footballer
- Gideon Buthelezi, boxer
- Amanda Dlamini, footballer
- Ayanda Dlamini, footballer
- Thamsanqa Gabuza, footballer
- Siboniso Gaxa, footballer
- Siboniso Gumede, footballer
- Two-Boys Gumede, footballer
- Mhlengi Gwala, triathlete
- Andile Jali, footballer
- Mabhuti Khenyeza, footballer
- Doctor Khumalo, footballer
- Brilliant Khuzwayo, footballer
- Njabulo Ngcobo, footballer
- Mbulelo Mabizela, footballer
- Thulani Malinga, boxer
- Peter Mathebula, boxer
- Senzo Meyiwa, footballer
- Wiseman Meyiwa, footballer
- Brighton Mhlongo, footballer
- Helman Mkhalele, footballer
- Siyabonga Mpontshane, footballer
- Moruti Mthalane, boxer
- Emmanuel Ngobese, footballer
- Mlungisi Ngubane, footballer
- Siphelele Mthembu, footballer
- Siyabonga Nkosi, footballer
- Siyabonga Nomvethe, footballer
- Luyanda Ntshangase, footballer
- Siyabonga Sangweni, footballer
- Thabani Mthembu, footballer
- Thamsanqa Sangweni, footballer
- Thulani Hlatshwayo, footballer
- Lucas Sithole, tennis
- Lucas Sithole, sculptor
- Lucas Radebe, footballer
- Samkelo Radebe, Paralympic runner and gold medalist
- Siphiwe Tshabalala, footballer
- Benedict Vilakazi, footballer
- Sibusiso Vilakazi, footballer
- Cedric Xulu, footballer
- Siyanda Xulu, footballer
- Dumisani Zuma, footballer
- Sibusiso Zuma, footballer
- Bongani Zungu, footballer
- Themba Zwane, footballer

== Musicians ==
- Ladysmith Black Mambazo, musicians
- Toya Delazy, singer, pianist, dancer, and performer
- Lucky Dube, reggae musician and Rastafarian
- Blxckie, rapper
- Azana, musician
- Babes Wodumo, Gqom musician
- Big Nuz, music group
- Big Zulu, musician
- Black Coffee, record producer and DJ
- Doja Cat, (half Zulu, half Jewish), American musician
- Sun-El Musician, musician
- DJ Clock, musician
- DJ Lag, Dj
- DJ Tira, musician
- DJ Zinhle, Dj and businesswoman
- Blaq Diamond, music duo
- Nandi Madida, musician and businesswoman
- Imithente, musicians
- Izingane Zoma, musicians
- Magogo kaDinuzulu, Zulu princess and artist
- Jabu Khanyile, musician
- Joe Nina, musician
- Babes Wodumo, musician
- Kelly Khumalo, musician
- K.O, rapper, musician
- Killer Kau, musician
- Sibongile Khumalo, musician
- Thokozani Langa, musician
- Solomon Linda, musician
- Nomcebo Zikode, musician
- Bhekumuzi Luthuli, musician
- Sipho Mabuse, musician
- Mandoza, musician
- Mthunzi, musician
- Vusi Mahlasela, musician
- Mfaz'Omnyama, musician
- Phumlani Mgobhozi, musician
- Busi Mhlongo, virtuoso singer, dancer and composer
- Somizi Mhlongo, television personality
- Bheki Mseleku, musician
- Sjava, musician and actor
- Nasty C, musician, rapper, songwriter and record producer
- Patrick Ngcobo, musician
- Shiyani Ngcobo, musician
- Zanefa Ngidi, musician
- Professor, musician, formally half of Tzozo and Professor
- Riky Rick, rapper
- Robert Sithole, musician
- Usimamane, musician
- Zola, musician, poet, actor and presenter
- Kwesta, rapper and songwriter
- Khaya Mthethwa, singer-songwriter, musician, composer, arranger, and the multi-instrumentalist
- Okmalumkoolkat, rapper
- Tyla, musician (half Zulu /half Indian)
- Sello Twala, musician
- Vusi Ximba, musician
- Zakes Bantwini, musician
- Zakwe, musician
- Zuluboy, musician
- Mlindo the Vocalist, musician
- Simmy, singer-songwriter, musician
- Young Stunna, musician
- Distruction Boyz, DJ duo
- Sipho Mchunu, singer, musician, dancer
- Dudu Zulu, musician, percussionist, dancer

== Criminals ==
- Sibusiso Duma
- Simon Majola
- Samuel Bongani Mfeka
- Elifasi Msomi
- Velaphi Ndlangamandla
- Moses Sithole
- Sipho Thwala
- Christopher Mhlengwa Zikode

== See also ==
- List of Xhosa people
- List of South Africans
- List of Southern Ndebele people
- List of South African office-holders
- Zulu language
- Zulu people
