= Zodwa =

Zodwa is a given name. Notable people with the name include:

- Zodwa Dlamini (born 1963), South African scientist
- Zodwa Dlamini (biochemist), South African biochemist
- Zodwa Mkandla, Zimbabwean businesswoman
- Zodwa Nsibande, South African activist
- Zodwa Nyoni (born c. 1988), Zimbabwean-born poet and playwright
- Zodwa Wabantu, South African media personality
