= Bafana Mlangeni =

South African actor

- Born: 1967
- Died: 11 July 2015 (age 48); Soweto, South Africa
- Occupation: Actor
- Years active: 1990s – 2015
- Spouse: Maki Maleka (m. 2003–his death)
- Children: 5

Bafana Mlangeni (1967 – 11 July 2015) was a South African actor most famous for acting as Sibeko, a drunkard and security spy in the sitcom Emzini Wezinsizwa.

== Acting career ==
Mlangeni acted as Sibeko, a spy for security guards in a hostel compound and reported about events around the place mostly Room 8 where Roland Mqwebu (James Mkhize), Jerry Phele (Thabang Mofokeng), Jabulani Nkosi (Benson Chirwali), Vusi Thanda (Moses Tshawe) and Shadrack Ngema (inyanga uMagubane) lived. He also did the sitcom's soundtrack. He later acted on e.tv's eKasi: Our Stories and Mzansi Bioskop movies until his death.

== Personal life ==
Mlangeni was married to Maki Mlangeni for 12 years and had five children with her. She described him as "a loving husband who cracked jokes even when they were quarreling".

== Death ==
Mlangeni got ill and was admitted to hospital in mid-June while he was shooting a film in Durban. He was discharged on 29 June 2015 and was admitted again on 11 July and Mlangeni died that same evening, 11 July 2015, at Bheki Mlangeni Hospital in Soweto. He was suffering from diabetes.
