= Top Billing =

Top billing refers to the actors named first in performing arts credits.

Top Billing may refer to:

- Top Billing (TV programme), a South African TV series
- Top Billing (magazine), a monthly magazine in South Africa

== See also ==
- "Top Billin'", a 1987 hip-hop single by Audio Two
