= Ngcobo (surname) =

Ngcobo is a surname. It may refer to:

- Abednigo Ngcobo (1950–2014), South African association football player
- Chris Ngcobo, former Acting head of Intelligence for the South African Police Service
- David Junior Ngcobo, South African hip hop musician, songwriter and record producer known as Nasty C
- Gabi Ngcobo, South African curator
- Lauretta Ngcobo (1931–2015), South African novelist and essayist
- Patrick Ngcobo (died 2015), South African Carnatic classic musician
- Njabulo Ngcobo, South African footballer
- Sandile Ngcobo (born 1953), former Chief Justice of South Africa
- Sandile Ngcobo (rugby union) (born 1989), South African rugby union player
- Shiyani Ngcobo, South African Maskandi guitarist and teacher
- Sthembiso Ngcobo (born 1983), South African association football player
