= Empini (TV series) =

South African TV series

- Genre: Drama
- Written by: Zaba Leroto Hlatshwayo (HW.); Byron Abrahams; Linda Bere; Nonzi Bogatsu; Vanishia Kisten; Thabo Kolatsoeu; Lurdes Laice; Tony Miyambo; Sasha Stokes
- Directed by: Menga Nhlabathi; Sibusiso Phakathi; Zimkhitha Maseko; Eric Mogale
- Starring: Siyabonga Thwala; Mpumi Mpama; Nambitha Ben-Mazwi; Amahle Khumalo; Angela Sithole; Joseph Sedibo; Ernest Ndlovu; Sparky Xulu; Sello Motloung
- Composer: Modia Shole
- Country of origin: South Africa
- Original languages: English; Zulu
- No. of seasons: 2
- No. of episodes: 104

Production
- Executive producers: Marc Jury; Nomsa Philiso; Nicola van Niekerk; Nomusa Nzima; Khayelihle Dominique Gumede; Clive Morris; Pamela Morris
- Cinematography: Lesiba Teffo
- Editors: David Gordon; Vanishia Kisten
- Running time: 20-23 minutes

Original release
- Network: Showmax
- Release: 23 May 2024

Empini is a 2024 South African Showmax Original television drama. The series was executive produced by Marc Jury, Nomsa Philiso, Nicola van Niekerk, Nomusa Nzima, Khayelihle Dominique Gumede, Clive Morris, and Pamela Morris. It stars Siyabonga Thwala, Mpumi Mpama, Nambitha Ben-Mazwi, Amahle Khumalo, Angela Sithole, Joseph Sedibo, Ernest Ndlovu, Sparky Xulu, and Sello Motloung as the main cast.

== Series overview ==
Each episode in season 1 was released twice on Thursday, and each episode in season 2 was released twice on Tuesday.

Season	Episodes	Originally released	
Season	Episodes	First released	Last released
1	52	May 23, 2024	November 14, 2024
2	52	March 4, 2025	August 26, 2025

=== Season 1 (2024) ===
Empini tells the story of a hot-headed Ndoni, who suspects her father's death was at the hands of his best friend, Khaya Bhodoza. She embarks on a politically charged journey to clear his name and uncover the government conspiracies surrounding his murder.

=== Season 2 (2025) ===
In the season, how far is she willing to go for revenge? A vengeful daughter, Ndoni, makes it her mission to repay her father's betrayal. Ndoni infiltrates the shady world of VIP security to face her enemies and fulfill her duty.

== Cast and character ==
- Mpumi Mpama as Khaya Bhodoza
- Siyabonga Thwala as Khaya Bhodoza
- Nambitha Ben-Mazwi as Ndoni Themba
- Angela Sithole as Winnie Bhodoza
- Amahle Khumalo as Nosipho Bhodoza
- Joseph Sedibo as Mkhonto Bhodoza
- Ernest Ndlovu as Enoch Mbatha
- Sparky Xulu as Zenzele Fassie
- Sello Motloung as General Moeti
- Terrence Ngwila as Thobani Kodisang
- Neo Ntlatleng as Uhuru Moeti
- Sandile Mahlangu as Jabulani Ngubane
- Charmaine Mtintaas as Dorah Themba
- Kabelo Thai as Madlopa Mkhwanazi
- Owen Sejakeas as General Moeti
- Jacques de Silva as Striker
- Nqobile Sipamla as Masasa Fassie
- Sonnyboy Mabasa as Dingane
- Palesa Shongwe as Tsala
- Khayelihle Sibisi as Vutha
- Simphiwe Sip Nkabinde as Bonga Themba

== Premiere and release ==
On 30 April 2024, Showmax Stories announced that Empini would premiere on 23 May, as part of its list of what to watch on Showmax in May 2024. On 23 May 2024, the series premiered with two episodes released every Thursday.

== Reception ==
On 27 May 2024, YoMzansi named Empini its TV Show of the Week.
