= Empini season 1 =

Empini
- Season 1
- Starring: Mpumi Mpama; Siyabonga Thwala; Nambitha Ben-Mazwi; Angela Sithole; Amahle Khumalo; Joseph Sedibo; Ernest Ndlovu; Sparky Xulu; Sello Motloung
- No. of episodes: 52

Release
- Original network: Showmax
- Original release: 23 May – 14 November 2024

Season chronology
- Next → Season 2

The first season of the Showmax Original action-drama series Empini premiered on 23 May 2024, and concluded on 14 November 2024, with a total of 52 episodes. It was announced that Empini would have only 2 episodes released every Thursday for 26 weeks. On 14 November 2024, Showmax announced the end of season 1, shortly after the release of the 52 episodes titled "Biting The Bullet/Hellfire". On 27 February 2025, showmax announce the release date for its second season.

== Cast and characters ==
=== Main cast ===
- Mpumi Mpama as Khaya Bhodoza
- Siyabonga Thwala as Khaya Bhodoza
- Nambitha Ben-Mazwi as Ndoni Themba
- Angela Sithole as Winnie Bhodoza
- Amahle Khumalo as Nosipho Bhodoza
- Joseph Sedibo as Mkhonto Bhodoza
- Ernest Ndlovu as Enoch Mbatha
- Sparky Xulu as Zenzele Fassie
- Sello Motloung as General Moeti

=== Supporting cast ===
- Terrence Ngwila as Thobani Kodisang
- Neo Ntlatleng as Uhuru Moeti
- Sandile Mahlangu as Jabulani Ngubane
- Charmaine Mtintaas as Dorah Themba
- Kabelo Thai as Madlopa Mkhwanazi
- Owen Sejakeas as General Moeti
- Jacques de Silva as Striker
- Nqobile Sipamla as Masasa Fassie
- Sonnyboy Mabasa as Dingane
- Palesa Shongwe as Tsala
- Khayelihle Sibisi as Vutha
- Simphiwe Sip Nkabinde as Bonga Themba
