= Daniel Ford (editor and writer) =

- Born: 1967 (age 57–58)

Daniel Ford (born England 1967) is a British/South African writer, editor and publisher. After emigrating to South Africa in 1994, he joined Independent Newspapers, working on the Weekend Argus and forming part of the launch team for Sunday Life magazine. He was subsequently appointed editor of that title before being recruited by Condé Nast to launch the men’s title GQ, again as editor. He later teamed up with the South African Broadcasting Corporation to launch another title, this time translating the weekly Top Billing TV programme into a print magazine. He launched Two Dogs, a book imprint aimed at men, in partnership with Penguin Random House, an initiative the Mail & Guardian dubbed Dick Lit. He later consulted to the Laureus World Sports Awards, Old Mutual, and Engen Petroleum on branding and media publications. He returned to England to produce books and e-books for the international co-edition market for book packagers Chase My Snail. A series of travel, sport and fitness titles have been put together and published across the world, including the UK, Spain, Denmark, France, Spain Russia, Indonesia, China, Australia and Southern Africa. He is frequently interviewed on TV and radio including the BBC, SABC and Colombia’s business channel DATAifx

== Non-fiction ==
Ford has written or co-written a number of books including

- Football Grounds Then and Now
- Don't Touch the Nuts: and the Other Unwritten Rules of British Pubs
- A Football Fan’s Guide to Europe
- A Fan’s Guide to World Cricket
- A Fan’s Guide to World Rugby
- Walking with Lions
- A series of fitness guides, Your 12-Week Guide to Running, Your 12-Week Guide to Cycling, Your 12-Week Guide to Swimming, and Your 12-Week Guide to Gym.
- A-Z of the Coronavirus
