= Ngidi =

Ngidi people are a Southern African Bantu Nguni group who trace their ancestors through central Africa. They were the head house Chief leaders of AmaLala nation. They are settled at the forests of Nkandla stretching to the mountains of Hlobane and the modern day Mlalazi municipality and Mzinyathi municipality on the upper Tukela river ruled by their last King MNguni omnyama kaKhuzwayo kaHlomuka.

After many attempts by Zulu King and his chiefs to summon MNguni to submit to the Mthethwa-Zulu kraal, He never came because he had no King above him. Fighting had to take place and that left many of his Chiefs, headmen and amabuto defeated and join the Mthethwa-Zulu tribe.

The Zulu king had to reinforce more of amabuto to summon MNguni at the last battle at Hlobane were the Ngidis were defeated and MNguni lost his eldest son Mteli after four days of battle night and day at Hlobane mountain.

In 1815 King MNguni and his followers dispersed to other Nguni tribe’s lands and crossing Tukela to seek shelter and to mourn his son Mteli whom lost his head on the battlefield. MNguni omnyama fled to the western parts of Drakensberg Mountain near orange river to seek refuge with other followers.

King Shaka was not pleased by the victory, as he wanted King MNguni’s head to gain him the highest supremacy power over other Nguni clans and tribes.

Notable people with the surname include:

- Lungi Ngidi (born 1996), South African cricketer
- Zanefa Ngidi (born 1986), South African Maskandi musician
