= Empini season 2 =

Empini
- Season 2
- Starring: Nambitha Ben-Mazwi; Mpumi Mpama; Angela Sithole; Amahle Khumalo; Joseph Sedibo; Ernest Ndlovu; Sparky Xulu; Sello Motloung
- No. of episodes: 52

Release
- Original network: Showmax
- Original release: 4 March – 26 August 2025

Season chronology
- ← Previous; Season 1

The second season of the Showmax Original action-drama series Empini began streaming on 4 March 2025, produced by Crystal Pics TV, starring Nambitha Ben-Mazwi, Angela Sithole, Mpumi Mpana, Amahle Khumalo, Joseph Sedibo, Ernest Ndlovu, Sparky Xulu, and Sello Motloung.

== Plot ==
In this season, Ndoni looks to take revenge on her father following his betrayal.

== Cast and characters ==
=== Main cast ===
- Mpumi Mpama as Khaya Bhodoza
- Nambitha Ben-Mazwi as Ndoni Themba
- Angela Sithole as Winnie Bhodoza
- Amahle Khumalo as Nosipho Bhodoza
- Joseph Sedibo as Mkhonto Bhodoza
- Ernest Ndlovu as Enoch Mbatha
- Sparky Xulu as Zenzele Fassie
- Sello Motloung as General Moeti

=== Supporting cast ===
- Terrence Ngwila as Thobani Kodisang
- Neo Ntlatleng as Uhuru Moeti
- Sandile Mahlangu as Jabulani Ngubane
- Charmaine Mtintaas as Dorah Themba
- Kabelo Thai as Madlopa Mkhwanazi
- Owen Sejakeas as General Moeti
- Jacques de Silva as Striker
- Nqobile Sipamla as Masasa Fassie
- Sonnyboy Mabasa as Dingane
- Palesa Shongwe as Tsala
- Khayelihle Sibisi as Vutha
- Simphiwe Sip Nkabinde as Bonga Themba

== Episodes ==
No. overall	No. in season	Title	Directed by	Written by	Original release date
53	1	"Welcome Home"	Unknown	Unknown	4 March 2025
54	2	"The Return Of Khaya Bhodoza"	Unknown	Unknown	4 March 2025
55	3	"My Comrade, My Friend"	Unknown	Unknown	11 March 2025
56	4	"Forgiveness Is A Curse"	Unknown	Unknown	11 March 2025
57	5	"Keep Your Comrades Close And Their Wives Closer"	Unknown	Unknown	18 March 2025
58	6	"Pawns"	Unknown	Unknown	18 March 2025
59	7	"The Darkest Night"	Unknown	Unknown	25 March 2025
60	8	"Comrades Don't Die"	Unknown	Unknown	25 March 2025
61	9	"The Rise And Fall Of Gilbert"	Unknown	Unknown	1 April 2025
62	10	"It's Your Job To Shoot Them"	Unknown	Unknown	1 April 2025
63	11	"Manipulate, If You Must"	Unknown	Unknown	8 April 2025
64	12	"Forbidden"	Unknown	Unknown	8 April 2025
65	13	"We Don't Question Our Parents"	Unknown	Unknown	15 April 2025
66	14	"For Better Or Worse"	Unknown	Unknown	15 April 2025
67	15	"A Man Can't Have Too Many Sons"	Unknown	Unknown	22 April 2025
68	16	"My Client Is Your Client"	Unknown	Unknown	22 April 2025
69	17	"Wolf In Bodyguard's Clothing"	Unknown	Unknown	29 April 2025
70	18	"What Are The Odds?"	Unknown	Unknown	29 April 2025
71	19	"The Footage Doesn't Lie"	Unknown	Unknown	6 May 2025
72	20	"Consequence Management"	Unknown	Unknown	6 May 2025
73	21	"Demotion"	Unknown	Unknown	13 May 2025
74	22	"Shots Fired"	Unknown	Unknown	13 May 2025
75	23	"A Reckoning"	Unknown	Unknown	20 May 2025
76	24	"Striker While The Iron Is Hot"	Unknown	Unknown	20 May 2025
77	25	"Flying Close To The Sun"	Unknown	Unknown	27 May 2025
78	26	"Missing And Missed"	Unknown	Unknown	27 May 2025
79	27	"Closure"	Unknown	Unknown	3 June 2025
80	28	"Damsel In Distress"	Unknown	Unknown	3 June 2025
81	29	"I'm Nothing Like You"	Unknown	Unknown	10 June 2025
82	30	"Mutually Assured Destruction"	Unknown	Unknown	10 June 2025
83	31	"The Next Best Ceo"	Unknown	Unknown	17 June 2025
84	32	"Good Bodyguard, Bad Bodyguard"	Unknown	Unknown	17 June 2025
85	33	"You're My Equal"	Unknown	Unknown	24 June 2025
86	34	"Political Partners"	Unknown	Unknown	24 June 2025
87	35	"I Know Who Killed Our Leader"	Unknown	Unknown	1 July 2025
88	36	"Mbali's First Mission"	Unknown	Unknown	1 July 2025
89	37	"I Don't Play Games With My Money"	Unknown	Unknown	8 July 2025
90	38	"My Comrade Didn'T Make It"	Unknown	Unknown	8 July 2025
91	39	"I Thought We Were Friends"	Unknown	Unknown	15 July 2025
92	40	"Don't Burst My Bubble"	Unknown	Unknown	15 July 2025
93	41	"Fall From Grace"	Unknown	Unknown	22 July 2025
94	42	"You're Not A Fool"	Unknown	Unknown	22 July 2025
95	43	"You're Not A Fool"	Unknown	Unknown	29 July 2025
96	44	"The Right Thing To Do"	Unknown	Unknown	29 July 2025
97	45	"The Almighty Enoch"	Unknown	Unknown	5 August 2025
98	46	"The Elective Conference - Part 1"	Unknown	Unknown	5 August 2025
99	47	"The Elective Conference - Part 2"	Unknown	Unknown	12 August 2025
100	48	"Honourable Members"	Unknown	Unknown	12 August 2025
101	49	"The New And Improved Deputy President"	Unknown	Unknown	19 August 2025
102	50	"I Didn't Do Anything"	Unknown	Unknown	19 August 2025
103	51	"The Black Mamba"	Unknown	Unknown	26 August 2025
104	52	"We Are Our Father's Children"	Unknown	Unknown	26 August 2025

== Production ==
=== Casting ===
In this season, Mpumi Mpama took on the significant role formerly played by Siyabonga Thwala, while Ernest Ndlovu retained his role.
