= Emzini Wezinsizwa =

South African TV show

- Genre: Situation comedy
- Created by: Pixley Muziwakhe Thulani Shabangu
- Developed by: Pixley Muziwakhe Thulani Shabangu
- Written by: Pixley Muziwakhe Thulani Shabangu Sipho Sydney Shabangu Nyembezi Kunene
- Directed by: Muntu Zwane
- Starring: Shadrack Ngema Vusi Thanda Siyabonga Thwala Siphiwe Nkosi Augustine Shotholo
- Country of origin: South Africa
- Original languages: Zulu; Xhosa; Sesotho; English; Fanagalo
- No. of seasons: 9

Production
- Producer: Pixley Muziwakhe Thulani Shabangu Oupa Mbhele
- Production locations: Johannesburg & Mamelodi Hostels
- Running time: 30 minutes
- Production company: SHAMBE Productoins

Original release
- Network: SABC 1
- Release: 6 November 1994 – 2004

Emzini Wezinsizwa is a sitcom that was broadcast on SABC1 in South Africa between 1994 and 2004. It starred Roland Mqwebu, Jabulani Nkosi, Jerry Phele, Shadrack Ngema and Vusi Thanda.

== Plot ==
The sitcom is about the antics of five adult males who move to a Johannesburg hostel compound to earn a living. They live in Room 8 - the most controversial and popular room of the hostel - and always find themselves on the wrong side of the hostel's authorities.

== Production ==
The show ended in August 2003 after three starring actors Roland Mqwebu, Jabulani Nkosi and Jerry Phele who played Mkhize, Chirwali and Mofokeng respectively were fired for high salary demands and being "rebellious". They were later replaced by Siyabonga Thwala, Siphiwe Nkosi and Augustine Shotholo together with Vusi Thanda and Shadrack Ngema for the next season of 26 episodes which started on 15 December 2003.played different roles. Siyabonga Thwala appears as Mkhize jnr, Augustine appears as Pitros Madimetja, Siphiwe appears as Mazunya. The new series was met with negative remarks. South African musician and notable viewer of the sitcom Jabu Khanyile made it clear that he preferred the original characters and that the new series was "nonsense".
