= Mlangeni =

Mlangeni is a surname. Notable people with the surname include:

- Andrew Mlangeni (1925–2020), South African political activist and campaigner
- Bafana Mlangeni (1967–2015), South African actor
- Don Mlangeni (born 1959), South African actor
- Sabelo Mlangeni (born 1980), South African photographer
