= Gamede =

Gamede can refer to:

- Cyclone Gamede, the exceptionally wet seventh named storm of the 2006–07 South-West Indian Ocean cyclone season
- Mzikayifani Andries Gamede (born 1964), South African politician (ANC, MK Party)
- Bongeka Gamede (born 1999), soccer player and (as of 2024) member of the South Africa women's national team.
- Thulani Gamede, South African politician

== See also ==
- Gumede
- Gamedec
