= Maphumulo Local Municipality elections =

Local elections in KwaZulu-Natal, South Africa

The Maphumulo Local Municipality council consists of twenty-five members elected by mixed-member proportional representation. Thirteen councillors are elected by first-past-the-post voting in thirteen wards, while the remaining twelve are chosen from party lists so that the total number of party representatives is proportional to the number of votes received.

In the election of 4 November 2026 the uMkhonto weSizwe Party (MKP) obtained a plurality of ten seats as the council.

== Results ==
The following table shows the composition of the council after past elections.

Event	ANC	EFF	IFP	MKP	Other	Total
2000 election	4	—	17	—	0	21
2006 election	7	—	14	—	0	21
2011 election	12	—	8	—	2	22
2016 election	13	0	9	—	0	22
2021 election	11	1	10	—	1	23
2026 election	6	1	8	10	0	25

== December 2000 election ==
The following table shows the results of the 2000 election.

Party	Ward			List			Total seats
Party	Votes	%	Seats	Votes	%	Seats	Total seats
Inkatha Freedom Party	15,822	80.38	11	15,641	79.72	6	17
African National Congress	3,783	19.22	0	3,454	17.61	4	4
Democratic Alliance	78	0.40	0	524	2.67	0	0
Total	19,683	100.00	11	19,619	100.00	10	21
Valid votes	19,683	97.54		19,619	97.42		
Invalid/blank votes	496	2.46		520	2.58		
Total votes	20,179	100.00		20,139	100.00		
Registered voters/turnout	36,693	54.99		36,693	54.89		

== March 2006 election ==
The following table shows the results of the 2006 election.

Party	Ward			List			Total seats
Party	Votes	%	Seats	Votes	%	Seats	Total seats
Inkatha Freedom Party	13,752	64.41	9	13,809	64.65	5	14
African National Congress	7,076	33.14	2	7,093	33.21	5	7
Democratic Alliance	524	2.45	0	458	2.14	0	0
Total	21,352	100.00	11	21,360	100.00	10	21
Valid votes	21,352	98.01		21,360	97.86		
Invalid/blank votes	434	1.99		468	2.14		
Total votes	21,786	100.00		21,828	100.00		
Registered voters/turnout	40,972	53.17		40,972	53.28		

== May 2011 election ==
The following table shows the results of the 2011 election.

Party	Ward			List			Total seats
Party	Votes	%	Seats	Votes	%	Seats	Total seats
African National Congress	14,489	53.91	10	14,800	54.78	2	12
Inkatha Freedom Party	10,177	37.87	1	10,088	37.34	7	8
National Freedom Party	1,827	6.80	0	1,708	6.32	2	2
African Christian Democratic Party	172	0.64	0	130	0.48	0	0
Congress of the People	127	0.47	0	136	0.50	0	0
Democratic Alliance	84	0.31	0	155	0.57	0	0
Total	26,876	100.00	11	27,017	100.00	11	22
Valid votes	26,876	98.06		27,017	98.40		
Invalid/blank votes	533	1.94		440	1.60		
Total votes	27,409	100.00		27,457	100.00		
Registered voters/turnout	43,023	63.71		43,023	63.82		

== August 2016 election ==
The following table shows the results of the 2016 election.

Party	Ward			List			Total seats
Party	Votes	%	Seats	Votes	%	Seats	Total seats
African National Congress	17,025	55.97	7	17,427	57.11	6	13
Inkatha Freedom Party	12,142	39.91	4	12,120	39.72	5	9
Economic Freedom Fighters	419	1.38	0	435	1.43	0	0
Democratic Alliance	287	0.94	0	286	0.94	0	0
Ubumbano Lwesizwe Sabangoni	187	0.61	0	248	0.81	0	0
Independent candidates	360	1.18	0				0
Total	30,420	100.00	11	30,516	100.00	11	22
Valid votes	30,420	98.53		30,516	98.48		
Invalid/blank votes	453	1.47		470	1.52		
Total votes	30,873	100.00		30,986	100.00		
Registered voters/turnout	49,456	62.43		49,456	62.65		

== November 2021 election ==
The following table shows the results of the 2021 election.

Party	Ward			List			Total seats
Party	Votes	%	Seats	Votes	%	Seats	Total seats
African National Congress	12,543	46.97	6	12,288	46.74	5	11
Inkatha Freedom Party	11,152	41.76	6	11,183	42.54	4	10
Economic Freedom Fighters	861	3.22	0	870	3.31	1	1
Independent Alliance	247	0.92	0	454	1.73	1	1
Democratic Alliance	332	1.24	0	313	1.19	0	0
African Independent Congress	245	0.92	0	249	0.95	0	0
Independent candidates	455	1.70	0				0
Abantu Batho Congress	219	0.82	0	234	0.89	0	0
National Freedom Party	172	0.64	0	194	0.74	0	0
African People First	181	0.68	0	167	0.64	0	0
Justice and Employment Party	173	0.65	0	154	0.59	0	0
African Christian Democratic Party	82	0.31	0	81	0.31	0	0
African People's Movement	25	0.09	0	37	0.14	0	0
Congress of the People	10	0.04	0	39	0.15	0	0
African Transformation Movement	10	0.04	0	28	0.11	0	0
Total	26,707	100.00	12	26,291	100.00	11	23
Valid votes	26,707	97.67		26,291	97.60		
Invalid/blank votes	638	2.33		647	2.40		
Total votes	27,345	100.00		26,938	100.00		
Registered voters/turnout	49,978	54.71		49,978	53.90		

=== By-elections from November 2021 ===
The following by-elections were held to fill vacant ward seats in the period from November 2021.

After the assassination of the ANC's ward 11 councillor in September 2022, a by-election was held on 30 November. The ANC candidate won the by-election, increasing the party's share of the vote from under 50% to over 60%.

Date	Ward	Party of the previous councillor	Party of the newly elected councillor
30 November 2022	11	African National Congress	African National Congress

== November 2026 election ==
The following table shows the results of the 2026 election.

Party	Ward			List			Total seats
Party	Votes	%	Seats	Votes	%	Seats	Total seats
uMkhonto weSizwe Party	11,528	37.48	8	12,016	39.03	2	10
Inkatha Freedom Party	10,028	32.61	4	9,840	31.96	4	8
African National Congress	7,195	23.39	1	6,957	22.60	5	6
Economic Freedom Fighters	414	1.35	0	406	1.32	1	1
ActionSA	381	1.24	0	386	1.25	0	0
African Independent Congress	265	0.86	0	280	0.91	0	0
Democratic Alliance	212	0.69	0	208	0.68	0	0
KZN Independence	164	0.53	0	151	0.49	0	0
Independent Alliance	141	0.46	0	125	0.41	0	0
National Freedom Party	147	0.48	0	105	0.34	0	0
People's Freedom Party	46	0.15	0	144	0.47	0	0
Afrika Mayibuye Movement	62	0.20	0	56	0.18	0	0
Independent candidates	97	0.32	0				0
South African Communist Party	44	0.14	0	26	0.08	0	0
African Christian Democratic Party	28	0.09	0	40	0.13	0	0
African Transformation Movement	3	0.01	0	47	0.15	0	0
Total	30,755	100.00	13	30,787	100.00	12	25
Valid votes	30,755	98.71		30,787	98.83		
Invalid/blank votes	402	1.29		364	1.17		
Total votes	31,157	100.00		31,151	100.00		
Registered voters/turnout	55,772	55.86		55,772	55.85		
