= Phumlani =

Phumlani is a South African given name that may refer to

- Phumlani Mgobhozi (born 1978), Maskanda artist from South Africa
- Phumlani Nodikida (born 1978), South African rugby union player
- Phumlani Ntshangase (born 1994), South African football midfielder
