= Phuzushukela =

- Born: John Bhengu; 25 March 1930; Nkandla
- Died: 1982 Durban, South Africa
- Genre: Maskandi
- Occupations: Musician, songwriter
- Instruments: Guitar, Vocals

Phuzushukela (John Bhengu) was one of the first maskanda musicians, and has been described as a pioneer of the genre and the first rural artist in South Africa to achieve prominence.

He influenced later artists such as Johnny Clegg, Busi Mhlongo and Phuzekhemisi among others.

== Discography ==
- Sizwile Nsizwa (1975)
- Asambeni Siye Kwelakithi (1977)
- Sehlule Umkhomazi (1982)
