= Donald Nxumalo =

South African interior designer (born 1988)

- Born: Donald Ndlelene Nxumalo; July 2, 1988 (age 37); Tshwane, South Africa
- Education: Tshwane University of Technology
- Occupations: Interior decorator, television personality
- Years active: 2012–present
- Website: donaldnxumalo.africa

Donald Ndleleni Nxumalo (born July 2, 1988) is a South African interior designer and television personality.

He holds a degree in design from the Tshwane University of Technology and runs a Gauteng-based interior design studio called DNX Design Studio. He was a regularly featured guest on the South African Magazine Program Top Billing, where he was also the inaugural design winner of Win A Home in 2014.

He has released numerous interior design lines and is recognized as one of the most prolific and leading interior designers in South Africa.
