= Thabethe =

Thabethe is a South African Zulu surname that may refer to the following notable people:

- Elizabeth Thabethe (1959–2021), Deputy Minister of Tourism in South Africa
- Nonkhululeko Thabethe (born 1992), South African cricketer
- Thando Thabethe (born 1990), South African actress and radio presenter
- Ayanda Gugulethu Thabethe (born 1999), South African beauty pageant titleholder Miss Supranational South Africa 2023
- Ayanda Thabethe (born 1986), South African television presenter and entrepreneur
