= Madida =

Madida is a South African surname. Notable people with the surname include:

- Fani Madida (born 1966), South African football player
- Nandi Madida (born 1988), South African singer, actress, model, and television presenter
