= Shadrack Ngema =

South African actor and sports commentator

- Born: 10 October 1950; KwaZulu-Natal, South Africa
- Died: 5 December 2015 (aged 65); Durban, South Africa
- Occupations: Actor; sports commentator

Shadrack Ngema (10 October 1950 – 5 December 2015) was a South African actor and sports commentator. He is best known for playing the character Magubane on Emzini Wezinsizwa. He starred alongside Jerry Phele, Roland Mqwebu, Vusi Thanda and Jabulani Nkosi. The sitcom aired until 2004, on SABC 1.

Ngema was born in KwaZulu-Natal, South Africa in a traditional Zulu background. He was a sport commentator on Ukhozi FM.

== Death ==
He died of a heart condition on 5 December 2015.
