= Mfaz'Omnyama =

South African producer and singer

Mfaz’ Omnyama
- Born: Mpatheni Khumalo; 1959; Nongoma, KwaZulu-Natal, South Africa
- Origin: KwaZulu-Natal
- Died: 2001 (aged 41–42) St Benedict Hospital
- Genres: Maskandi
- Occupations: singer; producer
- Instrument: Guitar
- Label: Gallo Record Company

Mphatheni Khumalo popularly known as Mfaz’ Omnyama (1959–2001) was a South African performer of Maskandi music, guitar player, and lyricist.

He is known for his hit singles such as Khula Tshitshi Lami, Ngisebenzile Mama and Ngiyashisa Bhe.

== Early life and music career ==
Khumalo was born in rural Nongoma, KwaZulu-Natal. He was a left-handed self-taught master of the string and stage, and released many top-selling albums in his time.

Khumalo was discovered by former Ukhozi FM presenter and host Bodloza Nzimande while working in a mine in North West province which employed labourers from the Eastern Cape, specifically from Pondoland.

He was a solo musician and later became part of a music group called “Izingqungqulu Zomhlaba” consisting of Phuzekhemisi and Ihhashi Elimhlophe. Busi Mhlongo did several cover versions of his songs in his memory.

== Death ==
Mpatheni Khumalo died at the age of 42 in 2001, at St. Benedict Hospital in KwaZulu-Natal after struggling from pancreatic cancer. He left eight children and his wife.

== Discography ==
=== Studio albums ===
- Emazweni Baba (1995)
- Amagugu (1996)
- Khula Tshitshi Lami (1997)
- Ngiyashisa Bhe!! (1999)
- Ngisebenzile Mama (2000)
- Ngihlanze Ngedela (2001)

== International Performances ==
- Germany
- United Kingdom
- United States
- Hong Kong
