= Roland Mqwebu =

South African actor

- Born: Roland Bantubonke Mqwebu; 16 January 1941; Inanda, South Africa
- Died: 28 August 2015 (aged 74); Durban, South Africa
- Occupations: Actor, musician, businessman, director
- Years active: 1960s–2015
- Spouse: Pinky Mqwebu
- Children: 4

Roland Mqwebu (16 January 1941 – 28 August 2015) was a South African actor known for his role as James Mkhize, an induna and watchman in the sitcom Emzini Wezinsizwa.

== Early life ==
Mqwebu was born on 16 January 1941 in Inanda, the third of 13 children. He grew up in a Christian family with an interest in music and acting. He learned to play the piano and recorded his own songs, and also performed as a backup singer for Phuzekhemisi.

== Career ==
Mqwebu appeared in films including Diamante sir Gefahrlich (1965), uDeliwe (1976), and the television series Shaka Zulu (1986). In Shaka Zulu, he served as assistant director and portrayed Ngomane kaMqoboli.

He is best known for his role as Mkhize, an induna and security guard in the sitcom Emzini Wezinsizwa, where he appeared alongside Jerry Phele, Jabulani Nkosi, Vusi Thanda, and Shadrack Ngema.

== Personal life ==
Mqwebu lived in Belleview Gardens in Durban. He married Pinky Mqwebu, a former teacher, and they had four children. One of his children, Lawrencia, works as a content producer at Ukhozi FM.

== Death ==
Mqwebu died of kidney failure on 28 August 2015 at Ethekwini Heart Hospital and Heart Centre, aged 74.
