= Shwi no Mtekhala =

South African musical duo

- Origin: Johannesburg
- Genres: Maskandi
- Years active: 1990s–2026
- Labels: Gallo; Bula
- Past members: Mandla Xaba; Zwelenduna Rodgers Magubane

Shwi no Mtekhala was a South African Maskandi duo formed in the late 1990's. The group was composed of Mandla Xaba and Zwelenduna Rodgers Magubane.

== History ==
"Shwi", born "Mandla Xaba", and "Mtekhala", born "Zwelenduna Rodgers Magubane", met during their childhood at Msinga, KwaZulu-Natal. They relocated to Johannesburg in search of employment. They wrote songs for Hlanganani, an Isicathimiaya music group.

The duo signed a record deal with Gallo music, and released their first album "Dustbin", in 2003.

Two years later they released their second album titled, "Wangisiza Baba", which sold over 500,000 copies in South Africa. The album won "Best Selling Album of the Year" at the South African Music Awards 2006. The following year, at the 2007 SATMA Awards, the duo won "Best Song of the Year" and "Best Selling Album". (Wangisiza Baba)

On October 16th, 2020, the duo released a single, titled "Uthando", which featured South African singers Nathi Mankayi and Mnqobi Yazo. They also announced working on an album titled, "Wang'khulisa uMama", released on December 18th, 2021.

The duo was reportedly disbanded in April 2022.

== Band members ==
- Mandla Xaba (1990's - present)
- Zwelenduna Rodgers Magubane (1990's - present)
- In 2022, Shwi noMtekhala parted ways after Mtekhala was dissatisfied with how their manager Bongani Manyathi was handling the financial affairs of the duo. Shwi remained with Manyathi together with the additional member of the group, Khethonjani "Mthwalusobhokweni" Dludla. Mtekhala on the other side left with Madoda "Dogzin" Ntshingila, a bass guitarist who had worked with the group for decades, and they were joined by a young artist called Maqatha from Mnambithi.
- The new group Mtekhala, Maqatha noDogzin released only one album and we never heard of it again. Shwi on the side became a solo artist, Shwi Mantombazane, even though he was still working with both Manyathi and Dludla.
- Mtekhala in 2025 released a solo album titled Inkunz' Emavava, this project received a warm welcome. Many people were thrilled to know that Golog' Obomvu as Mtekhala is affectionately known can sing as a leading artist.
- In December 2025, in Mtekhala's festival in Vosloorus, Shwi was seen joining his long time partner and confirmed that the two was going to work together again. In 2026 February, the two released many videos on social media of them rehearsing together and singing their old hits. They also confirmed that Shwi noMtekhala project is underway, likely to be released during Easter Holidays.

== Discography ==
=== Studio albums ===
- Dustbin (2003)
- Wangisiza Baba (2005)
- Angimazi Ubaba (2006)
- Kukhulu Emgakubona (2007)
- Indod' Endlini (2011)
- Izinto Zomhlaba (2012)
- Bazali bami (2014)
- Emkhathini (2017)
- Seludlulile (2019)
- Wang'khulisa uMama (2021)

== Awards and nominations ==
Year	Award/Ceremony	Category	Results	Ref.
2007	South African Music Awards	Best-Selling Album of the Year	Won	
2007	South African Music Awards	Best Maskandi Album	Won	
2022	South African Music Awards	Best Maskandi Album	Nominated	
2022	South African Music Awards	Duo/Group of the Year	Nominated	
