= Bhekumuzi Luthuli =

South African Maskandi Artist

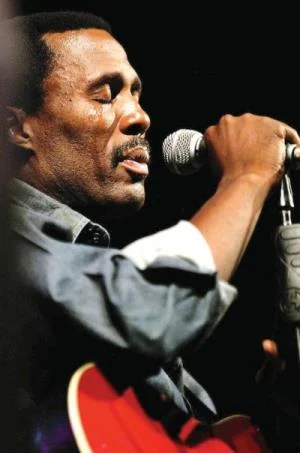

Background information
- Born: Bhekumuzi Luthuli; July 13, 1961; KwaMaqumbi, KwaMaphumulo, KwaZulu-Natal, South Africa.
- Died: April 7, 2010 (aged 48) Durban, KwaZulu-Natal, Republic of South Africa
- Genres: Maskandi
- Instrument: Vocals
- Years active: 1980–2010

Bhekumuzi Luthuli (13 July 1961 – 7 April 2010) was a well known South African Maskandi musician. Born in Kwa-Maphumulo, near the Kwa-Zulu Natal town of Stanger, he started making traditional Zulu music on a home-made guitar. In the early 1980s, he joined the Mbaqanga band Oshomi, based in Durban. After two albums with the group, Luthuli embarked on a successful solo career. His second and third solo releases, Unembeza and Wongikhonzela Enhliziyweni, won OKTV awards, and were followed by another 17 albums. Impempe attained platinum status, selling over 50,000 copies.

After 23 albums with over a million sales he released Imali YabeLungu in 2010. It reached gold status in just one week and the title track won a SATMA 2011 award in the category of best song.

== Discography ==
=== studio albums ===
- Uzoyidel' Inkani (1988)
- Wongikhonzela Enhliziyweni (1989)
- Ngizokwala Uzokhala (1990)
- Unembeza (1991)
- Ngizokwala Uzokhala (1992)
- Ubuyile (1992)
- Ziph' Ezakho (1993)
- Ngidedele (1994)
- Iphupho (1995)
- Impatha (1996)
- Afrika Hlangana (1996)
- Dear Msakazi (1997)
- Umaliyavuza (1998)
- Incwadi (1999)
- Phaphiyosi (2000)
- Khokha (2001)
- Igazi Lami (2002)
- Udumo Lwakhe (2003)
- A.T.M (2004)
- Impempe (2005)
- Inkinga Ngu R7 (2006)
- Unembeza (2008)
- 1818 (2009)
- Imali Yabelungu (2010)
- Isipho (The Gift) (2011)

== Death ==
Luthuli died aged 48 at McCord Hospital, Durban, after struggling for several weeks with the after-effects of a stroke. He was posthumously nominated for the 2012 18th South African Music Awards in the categories of Male Artist of the Year and Best Traditional Music Album for his last release, Isipho (Gift).

== Rivalry ==
Luthuli was engaged for some time in a musical rivalry with fellow Maskanda singer Thokozani Langa. The dispute is the subject of Langa's album entitled Phuma Kimi.
