= Gumede =

Gumede is a surname. Notable people with the name include:

- Gumede kaZulu (18th century), Zulu king
- Archie Gumede (1914–1998), South African anti-apartheid activist, lawyer and politician
- Elizabeth Komikie Gumede (1921–2016), South African anti-apartheid activist
- Josiah Tshangana Gumede (1867–1946), South African politician
- Josiah Zion Gumede (1919–1989), Zimbabwean politician
- Natalie Gumede (born 1984), British actress
- Nkosingiphile Gumede (born 1993), South African football goalkeeper
- Siboniso Gumede (born 1985), South African football defender
- Tshepo Gumede (born 1991), South African footballer
- Zandile Gumede (born 1961), South African politician
