= Maphumulo =

- Location within KwaZulu-Natal Location within South Africa
- Coordinates: 29.100°S 30.975°E
- Country: South Africa
- Province: KwaZulu-Natal
- District: Ilembe
- Municipality: Maphumulo

Area
  - Total: 5.11 km^{2} (1.97 sq mi)

Population (2001)
  - Total: 1,246
  - Density: 244/km^{2} (632/sq mi)
- Time zone: UTC+2 (SAST)

Maphumulo is a town in Ilembe District Municipality in the KwaZulu-Natal province of South Africa.

Settlement some 42 km north-west of Stanger and 38 km south-east of Kranskop. Named after the Mapumulo Zulu people who came to live here after being driven out by Shaka; the name is said to mean ‘heaven of rest’. This village had a trading store (owned by J.O. Christie) a police station, a magistrate's court, and a post office - all during the 1940s and 1950s.
