= Ntombikayise Priscilla Khubeka =

South African freedom fighter (1946-1987)

Ntombikayise (Ntombi) Priscilla Kubheka (1946-1987) was a South African anti-apartheid activist and a member of the armed wing of the ANC, Umkhonto we Sizwe. She died at the age of 41 in 1987 after being abducted and interrogated by the South African security forces due to her role as a co-ordinator for Umkhonto we Sizwe (MK). Kubheka's death was highly disputed during the hearings of the Truth and Reconciliation Commission, in which South African Police officials originally claimed they were not responsible for her death. Her body was exhumed in May 1997, near KwaDukuza, revealing that Kubheka had died of gunshot wounds.

== Disappearance ==
Kubheka lived in KwaMashu, a township north of Durban. She acted as a co-ordinator for externally and internally trained MK members living in KwaMashu. Wanting to obtain information on the arrival of four MK members from Swaziland, Vlakplaas police officers combined their resources with the Durban security branch to infiltrate Kubheka's network. Under the command of Captain Adriaan David Baker working with the Port Natal Security Branch, two C1/Vlakplaas askaris, Simon Radebe and Xola Frank ‘Jimmy’ Mbane, were tasked to make contact with her. Pretending to be MK members, they offered to help her accommodate activists from Swaziland. In May 1987, Mr Mbane drove Ms Kubheka to Battery Beach from where she was abducted by the Port Natal team. She was blindfolded, bound and taken to an abandoned shooting range at Winkelspruit, south of Durban. Still blindfolded, she was then subjected to interrogation by the Port Natal Security Branch. This team consisted of Colonel Andy Taylor, Captain Hentie Botha, Sergeant Laurance ‘Laurie’ Wasserman, Sergeant Cassie van der Westhuizen, Joe Coetzer and Warrant Officer ‘Bossie’ Basson.

== Testimony ==
During amnesty hearings conducted by the Truth and Reconciliation Commission, contrasting details surrounding Kubheka's death were given by those involved in her death. Captain Botha stated the interrogation was conducted largely in Zulu by Colonel Taylor, during which he struck Ms Kubheka across the back with a sjambok. According to Captain Botha, this was not a severe assault but intended to convey the gravity of the situation and persuade her to co-operate with them. Captain Botha testified that the interrogation lasted approximately fifteen to twenty minutes and that Taylor struck her approximately ten to fifteen times with a sjambok. Sergeant van der Westhuizen's testimony suggests that the interrogation lasted an hour. Both of these accounts were disputed by Mbane who alleged that the interrogation lasted for approximately two hours, during which he could hear her screams of pain from outside. Botha and other applicants testified that, during the course of the interrogation, Ms Kubheka agreed to co-operate with them but that she suddenly died of a heart attack. They claimed she grabbed her chest and fell over, experiencing a heart attack due to her being overweight.

Ms Kubheka's dead body was dumped near the Bhambayi informal settlement, some distance away from her home by Sergeants Wasserman and Salman Gerhardus du Preez. Captain Botha established that her family was unaware of her death and appeared to believe that she had gone into exile. It was subsequently rumoured that she had left the country for Mozambique because of the attentions of the Security Branch.

== Exhumation ==
These claims of the details surrounding Kubheka's death were seriously challenged by Kubheka's family. They contended that the police shot her in the head before dumping her body, which was confirmed following the exhumation of her body. The TRC's Investigative Unit exhumed remains believed to be Ms Kubheka's from a pauper's grave at Charlottedale Cemetery, KwaDukuza in May 1997. The applicants charged that the wrong body had been exhumed. In the post-mortem examination, a pathologist concluded that the remains matched those of Ntombi Kubheka. A spent 7.65mm bullet was found in the skull, indicating that she had been shot in the head. An attempt to use DNA testing from samples of bone and teeth failed as these had deteriorated and could not be used for DNA typing. The skull was sent to the University of Glasgow, which made a positive facial identification of the skull. Challenging these findings, the applicants demanded that another expert examine the skull. A report by the South African Police Service Forensic Science Laboratory in Pretoria further confirmed that the skull belonged to Ntombi Kubheka. The applicants did not challenge these conclusions, although they continued to contest the results of the investigation.

The six members of the Port Natal Security Branch, Radebe and Baker applied for amnesty for their role in the abduction, death and subsequent disposal of the body of Ms Kubheka. Applicants Botha, Du Preez, Wasserman and Van de Westhuizen were refused amnesty for failing to make full disclosure. Colonel Taylor died before his amnesty hearing. Applicants Radebe and Baker, who had not been present during the interrogation or involved in the disposal of the body, were granted amnesty for her abduction. Mr Mbane did not apply for amnesty.
