= Nandi Madida =

South African singer and songwriter (1988)

- Born: Nandi Mngoma; March 20, 1988 (age 37); Maphumulo, KwaZulu-Natal, South Africa
- Occupations: Singer; Model; Actress; Television personality
- Title: Miss Junior RSA
- Spouse: Zakes Bantwini (m. 2016)
- Parents: Thamsanqa Mngoma (father); Thandeka Mngoma (mother)
- Musical career
- Instruments: Vocals; Keyboard
- Years active: 2004–present
- Label: Universal Music Group

Nandi Madida (née Mngoma; born 20 March 1988) is a South African singer, actress, model and television presenter. Born and raised in Maphumulo, KwaZulu-Natal, South Africa, She rose to stardom after she was featured by DJ Franky as a vocalist on single "Tonight", which was released (2012).

Having signed with Universal Music Group in 2011, Madida released her self-titled debut studio album Nandi (2012).

== Life and career ==
Madida was born in Maphumulo and was raised in Durban, KwaZulu-Natal. She went to Danville Park Girls High School, after finishing her matric she went to study law at UKZN and later to Varsity College, even though her initial plan was to pursue journalism. Madida has been a dancer and model since childhood. She won the Miss Junior RSA title when she was eight.

=== Career ===
Her success in a talent search led to a position as a performer at the Gateway Mall in Umhlanga. In 2004, at the age of 15, she landed her first television job as host of the SABC2 pre-teen entertainment show called Bling, which mainly focused on music and movies.

=== 2011-2013:Nandi ===
In 2011, she released her first single "Tonight". She later signed with Universal Music Group and released her self-titled debut studio album Nandi in 2012.

In 2013, she co-hosted alongside ProVerb and Dineo Ranaka in the Mzansi Magic Magazine programme All Access Mzansi.

In 2014, Nandi Madida and K.O released the song "Skhanda Love", it became an instant hit in and was eventually nominated for several music awards.

From 2015 to 2016, she played Zokuthula Dhlomo in the Mzansi Magic telenovela The Road. She co-hosted the e.tv reality series Coke Studio.

In September 2016, she and Ayanda Thabethe co-hosted the BET entertainment magazine show BET A-List.

== Filmography ==
- All Access Mzansi (2013) – Herself
- ScreenTime with Nicky Greenwall (2014) – Herself
- The Road (2015) – Zokuthula "Zoe" Dhlomo
- Code Green (2015) – Herself
- Coke Studio (2016) – Herself
- BET A-List (2016) – Herself
- Lip Sync Battle Africa (2017) – Herself
- The Next Brand Ambassador (2019) – Herself
- Black Is King (2020) – Nala

== Discography ==
=== Solo studio albums ===
Title	Album details	Peak Chart Positions	Ref
Nandi	Released: 1 January 2012; Label: Universal Music (Pty) Ltd South Africa		

=== Singles ===
==== As lead artist ====
Title	Year	Peak Chart Positions	Album	Ref
"Mnandi"	2012		Nandi	
"Goodtimes"	2013		Nandi	
"In My Skin"	2014		Non-album single	
"Organic"	2020		TBA	

==== As featured artist ====
Title	Year	Peak Chart Positions	Album	Ref
"Skhanda Love" (K.O. feat. Nandi Mngoma)	2014		Skhanda Republic	
"Say U Will" (K.O. feat. Nandi Mngoma)	2019		PTY UnLTD	

== Awards and nominations ==
Year	Awards	Work	Category	Result	Ref.
2020	SAMA 26	"Say U Will"	Best Collaboration	Won	
2024	GQ Best Dressed Awards	Herself	Best Dressed Couple	Won	

== Personal life ==
Nandi Madida is married to Zakhele Madida known as Zakes Bantwini and they have two children.
