= Mhlengi Gwala =

Medal record

Men's paratriathlon

Representing South Africa

African Championships
Gold medal – first place	2025 Nelson Mandela Bay	PTS4

Mhlengi Gwala (born 12 April 1991) is an international elite triathlete from South Africa’s KwaZulu-Natal province. He was born in Durban, but considers his home town to be Chesterville.

== Career ==
Gwala has competed at international events since 2015:

- 2015 Chicago International Triathlon Union (ITU) Aquthlon World Championship (finished 24)
- 2015 ITU World Triathlon Grand Final Chicago (finished 57)
- 2017 ITU World Triathlon Grand Final Rotterdam (finished 47)

== Attack and injury ==
On 6 March 2018, Gwala was attacked on his pushbike by three men during a training ride before sunrise around Durban. The men pulled him from the bike and cut the calf of his right leg with a saw, damaging his muscles, nerves, and bone, then attacked his left leg. The attack continued even though he offered the attackers his wallet, mobile phone, and bike. The men departed and Gwala crawled to the road where he flagged down a car and was taken to a local hospital. Gwala said that the men spoke in a language he did not understand. Doctors were confident that his legs could be saved.

Within days, a crowdfunding effort had begun, with a goal of Rand 100,000 (about US$8,400) to “Get Mhlengi back on his bike”, by supporting his medical expenses‚ transportation‚ bike replacement and rehabilitation costs.
