= Eddie Zondi =

Radio personality and composer (b. 1967, d. 2014)

- Also known as: Makhosonke Zondi
- Born: Eddie Makhosonke Zondi; 9 October 1967; Soweto, South Africa
- Died: 16 June 2014 (aged 46) Johannesburg, South Africa
- Genres: Soul and RnB
- Occupation(s): Radio personality, composer
- Years active: 1996–2014

Eddie Makhosonke Zondi (9 October 1967 - 16 June 2014) was a South African radio personality known for his soul music ear, which he realised a number of compilation albums. Eddie was also famously recognized for his Sunday afternoon show The Romantic Repertoire on Metro FM as well as his well-received Sunday Soul sessions. He released two well-received compilations albums in his career.

== Radio career ==
Zondi's broadcast career began in the early 1990s on BOP TV. His first taste for radio developed at a shopping mall’s radio kiosk, where he was the host. He first joined Radio Metro (now known as Metro FM) as a weekend sports anchor and got his first professional break in 1996.

== Music compilation ==
Eddie was known to his listeners as the best romantic ballads compiler. His show The Romantic Repertoire' on Metro FM attracted thousands of listeners every Sunday afternoon. When the show ended on Sunday evening, he often took the soul session party to a physical venue where he would continue playing his Sunday Soul sessions.

== Personal life ==
Eddie grew up in Soweto, South Africa and was married to Phakamile Zondi. Zondi is survived by daughters Siphesihle Zondi and Zethembe Zondi. He began his radio career in 1996 and worked as a radio personality until the time of his death.

== Awards and nominations ==
- Metro FM Awards: 2015, Special Recognition Award

== Discography ==
=== Compilation albums ===
Year	Album name
2001	Zondi's Romantic Ballads: Label: EMI; Format: CD, digital download
2003	Zondi's Romantic Ballads – Vol.2: Label: EMI; Formal: CD, digital oceans
