= Zanefa Ngidi =

South African musician (born 1986)

- Born: 5 February 1986 (age 39); KwaMaphumulo, KwaZulu-Natal, South Africa
- Genres: Maskandi; alternative; indie
- Occupations: Singer; songwriter
- Instrument: vocals
- Labels: N'Groove Sound (former)

Zanefa Ngidi (born 5 February 1986) is a South African maskandi musician.

== Early life and education ==
He was born 1986 in Embizeni, Kwa-Maphumulo, near the Kwa-Zulu Natal town of KwaDukuza. He finished his secondary education at Velangezwi High School.

== Music career ==
Zanefa released more than four albums from 2010. He released his first album in 2010 titled Umona. The project got him a nomination for Best Maskandi Album of the Year at the 2011 SA Traditional Music Awards (SATMA Awards).

== Discography ==
=== Studio albums ===
- Umona (2010)
- Amangwinya (2011)
- Ebusweni bencwadi (2012)
- Kwanompumelelo (2014)
- Umalum'umbavumbavu (2015)
- Abahambe Osbali (2017)
- Amahliphihliphi (2017)
- Inyoka yami (2020)

== Awards and nominations ==
| Year | Award | Category | Results | Ref. |
|---|---|---|---|---|
| 2011 | SATMA | Best Maskandi Album | Nominated | |
