= Izingane Zoma =

South African Maskandi group

- Origin: Johannesburg
- Genre: Maskandi
- Years active: 1993–present
- Labels: Gallo; Sony
- Members: Thandoluni Phungula; Bongekile Ngobese; Tholakele Ngobese Busani Khuzwayo; Shobeni khuzwayo

Izingane Zoma are a Maskandi group from Nquthu, KwaZulu-Natal, South Africa formed in 1993. Their politically inspired songs have attracted wide discussion and chart success in their home country. This vocal trio has enjoyed a string of gold and platinum-level record sales in the South African market. The group were SATMA nominees in 2011, in the category of Best Video.

All of the group's songs are composed by the Khuzwayo brothers - Shobeni and Busani. Shobeni is also the Producer of the group, while Busani regularly performs guitar.

The live band includes drums, bass guitar, guitar, concertina, plus of course the vocals and dancers.

== Band members ==
=== Current members ===
- Thandoluni Phungula - lead vocals
- Bongekile Ngobese passed away
- Tholakele Ngobese - vocals
- Busani - guitarist and backing
- Shobeni - producer and backing

== Discography ==
=== Singles ===
- "Msholozi" 2006
- "Mzilikaze kaMashobane" 2011 June
- "Obama" (album) 2011 September
- "uMalema" 2011 November

== Awards and nominations ==
Year	Award	Category	Results	Ref.
2011	SATMA	Best Video	Nominated	
2020	26th SAMA	Best Maskandi Album	Nominated	
