= Zodwa Mkandla =

Zimbabwean businesswoman

Zodwa Mkandla is a Zimbabwean businesswoman. She founded a travel management company, Traverze Travel.

== Background ==
Mkandla was born in Mbembesi, Bubi in Matebeleland province. She had her early education at Mqwashini then proceeded to Mt. Pleasant High School for her secondary education then moved back to Bulawayo to St. Columbus where she finished her high school. She cofounded a travel agency in 1999, where she was the marketing director. In 2003, Mkandla established her own travel management company, Traverze Travel. The company has won several awards, including Emirates award as the best performing travel agent in Zimbabwe and was also nominated at the World Travel Awards 2021.

In an interview for the year 2018, Mkandla announced that she is the godmother of Tanzanian artist Diamond Platnumz daughter. In 2021, Mkandla was appointed into the ZANU PF Resource Mobilisation Committee by the president of Zimbabwe, Emmerson Mnangagwa.

== Recognition ==
In May 2017, Mkandla was recognised as International Business Woman of the Year at The Women4Africa Award and was included in the list of top 100 Women in the Tourism and Travel industry in Africa.

- Outstanding Woman CEO of the Year – Megafest Women's Awards 2018
- Tourism & Hospitality Businesswoman of the Year Award – Zimbabwe Leadership Awards – ZILA Nationals 2017
- Outstanding Woman of the Year – Megafest Women's Awards 2017
- International Business Woman of the Year – Women4Africa Awards UK 2017
- Business Woman of the Year Tourism and Hospitality Services Industry – Women4Africa Awards UK 2017
- Top Female Business Leader of the Year – Women's Business and Leadership Awards 2018
- Top Female Business Leader of the Year – International Women's Entrepreneurial Challenge (IWEC) 2016 Business Award
- 1st runner up Business Woman of the Year – Megafest Awards 2016
- Winner – Tourism category – Zimbabwe National Chamber of Commerce Women in Business Awards (WECA) 2015
