= Imithente =

South African Maskandi Group

- Origin: Johannesburg
- Genre: Maskandi
- Years active: 1993-present
- Label: Gallo Record Company
- Members: Dumisile Manana (Vocals); Nokwazi Ntuli (Vocals)
- Past members: Buselaphi Gxowa (Vocals)1993 – 2012; Simosakhe Mthalane (guitarist)

Imithente (named after a kind of grass that grows in rural KwaZulu Natal) is a Maskandi group from Johannesburg, South Africa.

The band was formed in 1993 by late guitarist, Simosakhe Mthalane, and three female singers: Buselaphi Gxowa, Dumisile Manana and Nokwazi Ntuli, all from KwaZulu-Natal. They have produced several albums attaining gold sales in their home country and won SAMA and SATMA awards.

The group performs as a 10-piece band with 6 singer/dancers and 4 musicians.

== Discography ==
=== studio albums ===
- Isidikiselo (2001)
- Awusay' Ebhodweni (2002)
- Ngiyakushiya Mawulele (2003)
- Umnyango Ongenasikhiye (2004)
- Igaz' Elibabayo (2005)
- Ake Niyek' Ukukhuluma (2006)
- Bamb' Ezakho (2007)
- Simqonda Ngqo (2008)
- Vimb' Ezansi (2010)
- Mbibi (2011)
- Vuka Mathambo (2012)
- Ichakijani (2014)
- Mhlobo Wami (2014)
- Washonaphi (2015)
- S'yawuvala Umlomo (2016)
- Asekhon' Amalahle ? (2018)
- Uzoyikhona Kanjani (2018)
- Umakoti Egoyile (2026)

== International performances ==
- 2002 La Rochelle, France and India
- 2008 Vienna
- 2009 Algiers for the Pan African Cultural Festival.
