= Maphumulo Local Municipality =

Coordinates: 29°09′00″S 31°03′58″E

Maphumulo
- Local municipality
- Seal

- Location in KwaZulu-Natal
- Country: South Africa
- Province: KwaZulu-Natal
- District: iLembe
- Seat: Maphumulo
- Wards: 13

Government
  - Type: Municipal council
  - Mayor: Zibuyisile Fortunate Khuzwayo-Dlamini (ANC)

Area
  - Total: 896 km^{2} (346 sq mi)

Population (2011)
  - Total: 96,724
  - Density: 108/km^{2} (280/sq mi)

Racial makeup (2011)
  - Black African: 99.7%
  - Coloured: 0.1%
  - Indian/Asian: 0.1%
  - White: 0.1%

First languages (2011)
  - Zulu: 95.4%
  - Southern Ndebele: 1.4%
  - English: 1.2%
  - Other: 2%
- Time zone: UTC+2 (SAST)
- Municipal code: KZN294

Maphumulo Local Municipality is an administrative area in the iLembe District of KwaZulu-Natal in South Africa. Maphumulo is an isiZulu name meaning "place of rest".

The municipality is predominantly rural, comprising mostly tribal land, which is administered by the Ingonyama Trust on behalf of local communities. Sugar-cane cultivation is the predominant economic activity and land use in the municipality. Subsistence agricultural activities in the form of small cropping areas attached to traditional family units dominate land usage.

The only major town in the municipality is Maphumulo.

== Main places ==
The 2001 census divided the municipality into the following main places:

Place	Code	Area (km^{2})	Population
Amabhedu	54601	27.75	6,159
Cele	54602	21.80	1,201
Embo	54603	38.96	4,704
Hlongwa	54604	33.88	7,044
Mabomvini	54605	118.39	13,850
Mkhonto	54606	255.76	35,208
Mpungose	54607	9.62	949
Ngcolosi	54608	177.93	19,370
Nodunga	54609	58.95	3,959
Qadi	54610	30.28	5,710
Qwabe/Waterfall	54611	80.50	16,906
Zubane	54612	41.25	5,594

== Politics ==
The municipal council consists of twenty-five members elected by mixed-member proportional representation. Thirteen councillors are elected by first-past-the-post voting in thirteen wards, while the remaining twelve are chosen from party lists so that the total number of party representatives is proportional to the number of votes received.

In the election of 4 November 2026 the uMkhonto weSizwe Party (MKP) obtained a plurality of ten seats as the council.

The following table shows the results of the election.

Party	Ward			List			Total seats
Party	Votes	%	Seats	Votes	%	Seats	Total seats
uMkhonto weSizwe Party	11,528	37.48	8	12,016	39.03	2	10
Inkatha Freedom Party	10,028	32.61	4	9,840	31.96	4	8
African National Congress	7,195	23.39	1	6,957	22.60	5	6
Economic Freedom Fighters	414	1.35	0	406	1.32	1	1
Independent candidates	97	0.32	0				0
11 other parties	1,493	4.85	0	1,568	5.09	0	0
Total	30,755	100.00	13	30,787	100.00	12	25
Valid votes	30,755	98.71		30,787	98.83		
Invalid/blank votes	402	1.29		364	1.17		
Total votes	31,157	100.00		31,151	100.00		
Registered voters/turnout	55,772	55.86		55,772	55.85		
