= Thokozani Langa =

South African maskanda musician

Thokozani 'Somnandi' Langa
- Born: Thokozani Langa; February 9, 1972 (age 54); Ulundi KwaZulu Natal, South Africa
- Other name: SomDelicious Somnandi
- Occupation: Musician
- Spouse: Senzekile Basi (m. 2010)
- Musical career
- Genre: Maskandi
- Years active: (1994 - Date)
- Label: Bula Music

Thokozani Langa (born 9 February 1972) is a Maskandi musician from Mahlabathini, Kwa-Zulu Natal, South Africa.

== Career ==
Langa signed with Bula Music in 2004 to release his third studio album I-Protection Order (2011). After receiving exposure on national radio and the traditional South African music program Ezodumo, he was nominated for SAMA for both his albums Ipeni Nephepha (2005) and Lishonil' Ilanga (2006), in the category of Best Maskandi Album and Best Mbaqanga Album respectively, alongside The Soul Brothers and Bhekumuzi Luthuli.

Langa was engaged for some time in a musical rivalry with fellow Maskandi singer Bhekumuzi Luthuli. The dispute is the subject of Langa's album entitled Phuma Kimi, released in 2007, which won the SATMA award for Best Male Artist in September that year. In 2020, he won Best Maskandi Album award at the SAMA.

== Discography ==
=== Studio albums ===
- Ipeni ne phepha (2005)
- Lishonile ilanga (2006)
- Phuma kimi (2007)
- Wawuthini (2008)
- Inganekwane (2009)
- Sthanda Ifamily(2010)
- I-Protection Order (2011)
- Nganginemali (2012)
- Inyakanyaka (2013)
- Igama Lami (2014)
- Khozeka Mchana (2015)
- Amabrazo (2016)
- Isiqalekiso (2017)
- Upopayi (2019)
- Iqatha Eliziqobayo (2020)
- Idayimani (2021)
- Iskhiye se coldroom (2022)
- View Once (2026)

== Awards and nominations ==
Year	Award	Category	Results	Ref.
2012	18th South African Music Awards	Best Maskandi Album	Won	
2014	20th South African Music Awards	Best Maskandi Album	Won	
2020	26th SAMA	Best Maskandi Album	Won	
