= Phumlani Mgobhozi =

South African musician (born 1978)

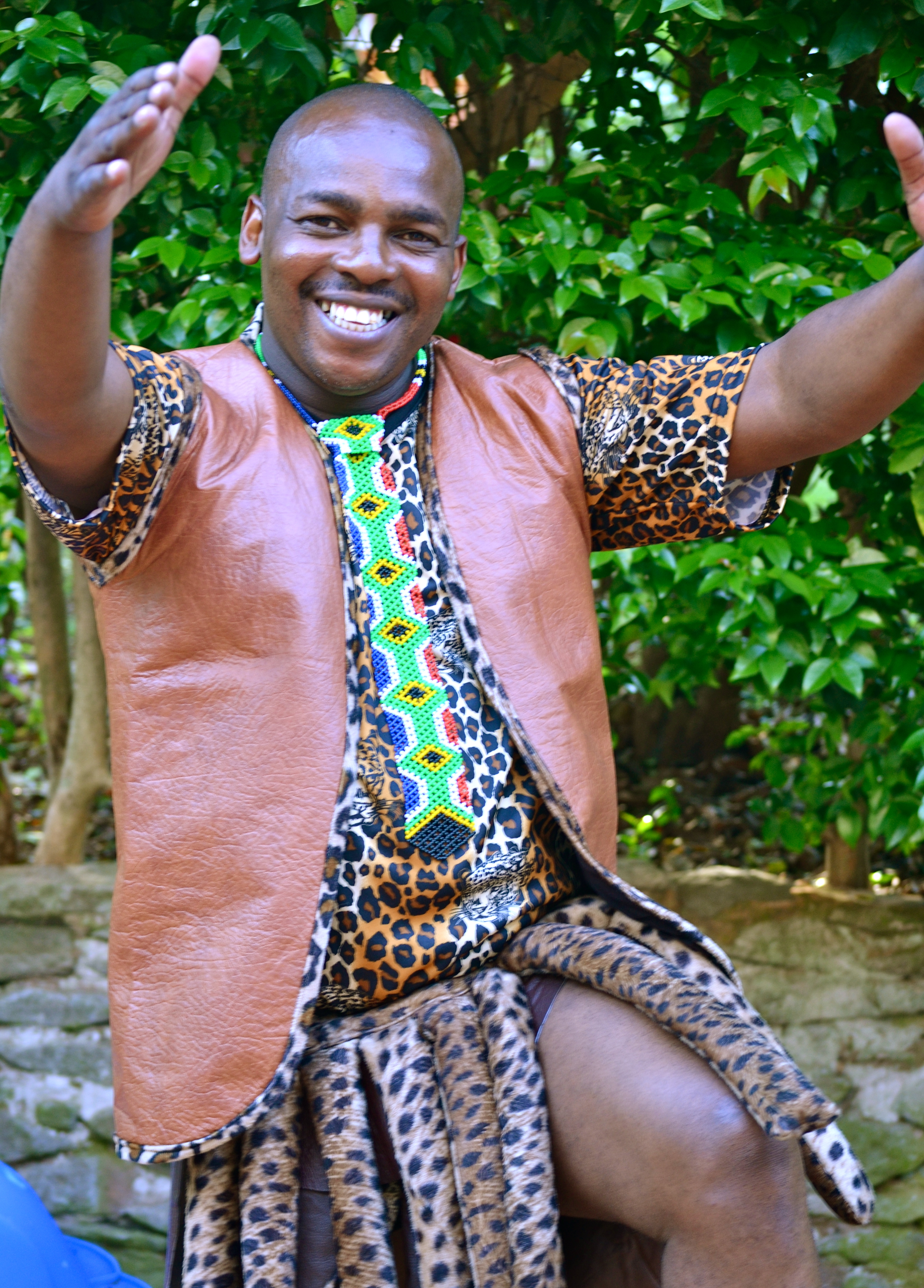
Phumlani Mgobhozi

Phumlani Mgobhozi (born 15 August 1978) is a Maskanda artist from Umkomaas, South Africa. He started his professional career as a Gospel singer in 2001. He released five gospel albums between 2002 and 2011, before being encouraged to try his hand at Maskandi.

This debut Album in Maskanda entitled Is'qomaqomane, was released in January 2014. He released his first music video for this song in May 2014. The music video was shot at Mahlongwa near Umkomaas on the KwaNatal south coast, the area of his birth.

He has been featured in Drum Magazine, where he was interviewed about his life and the road to the release of his first Maskanda Album, Is'qomaqomane.

He was signed by PM Productions in June 2008
