= Richard Mdluli =

South African police officer

Lieutenant General Richard Naggie Mdluli (born May 1958) was the head of Police Crime Intelligence in South Africa from 2009 to 2012. He was replaced by Chris Ngcobo.

He was dismissed from the South African Police Service on 17 January 2018. On 30 July 2019, Mdluli was found guilty of kidnapping and assaulting his former lover's husband. He received a five-year prison sentence, which he started serving on 29 September 2020.

== Career ==
Richard Mdluli joined the South African Police (SAP) in August 1979 as a Constable in Pietermaritzburg. Mdluli was promoted to the Officer Cadre in 1991 as part of the reforms and served as Station Commander at the Vosloorus police station and as the Deputy Police Commissioner of Gauteng. In 2007, then Deputy Commissioner Mdluli headed the investigation of fraud and corruption charges against advocate Gerrie Nel, then head of the elite Scorpions investigative unit in Gauteng. Nel was arrested in Pretoria on 8 January 2008 and appeared in the Pretoria Magistrate's Court the following day, where the chief prosecutor refused to charge him, due to insufficient evidence.

Mdluli was appointed as Divisional Commission of Police's Crime Intelligence Division effective from 1 July 2009, after an interview with four of Jacob Zuma's cabinet. The panel was led by Police Minister Nathi Mthethwa and included State Security Minister Siyabonga Cwele, the then home affairs deputy minister Malusi Gigaba and former safety and security deputy minister Susan Shabangu.

== Criminal charges ==
In March 2011, a warrant was issued for Mdluli's arrest, in connection with the murder of Oupa Ramogibe, who was shot dead on 17 February 1999. On 31 March, Mdluli handed himself over to the Boksburg Magistrate's Court, where he and three others were charged with intimidation, three counts of kidnapping, two counts of assault with intent to do grievous bodily harm, attempted murder, and conspiracy to commit murder. Mdluli faced an additional charge of defeating and obstructing the course of justice.

On 21 September 2011, Mdluli faced further charges of fraud and corruption in the Commercial Crimes Court in Pretoria. He was alleged to have employed his friends and family as intelligence operatives, and misused police funding to purchase luxury cars.

The fraud and corruption charges against Mdluli were dropped on 14 December 2011. The National Prosecuting Authority (NPA) provisionally withdrew murder charges against Mdluli on 10 April 2012, in order to complete an inquest of the case. Mdluli's suspension from the SAPS was lifted on Tuesday, 27 March.

Police Minister Nathi Mthethwa announced on 9 May that Mdluli would be moved from crime intelligence to a position in the office of the deputy national police commissioner for operations, Fannie Masemola. On 27 May a spokesperson for acting national police commissioner Nhlanhla Mkhwanazi, announced that Mdluli had been suspended based on allegations that have come to light during the inquest.

After several delays, the inquest hearing was postponed until September 2012. On 2 November, magistrate Jurg Viviers, ruled there was no evidence implicating Mdluli in the murder of Oupa Ramogibe.

== Reinstatement of charges ==
On 23 September 2013 Judge John Murphy instructed SAPS to reinstate all criminal charges against Mdluli without delay.

== Conviction and imprisonment ==
On 30 July 2019, Mdluli and his co-defendant Mthembeni Mthunzi were found guilty of four counts of intimidation, two counts of kidnapping, two counts of common assault and two counts of assault. On 29 September 2020, they were sentenced to 5 years in prison, which they both immediately began serving.
