= Seth Mazibuko =

South African student protestor

Seth Mazibuko was born in Orlando, Soweto on 15 June 1960 and was the youngest member of the South African Students' Organisation that planned and led the Soweto uprising. He was arrested in July 1976 at age sixteen. Mazibuko was held in solitary confinement for 18 months in Number Four at the Fort Prison in Braamfontein before being charged, tried, and sent to Robben Island for seven years where he studied English and obtained his B. Ed. degree.
