= Zodwa Dlamini (biochemist) =

South African biochemist

- Born: KwaZulu-Natal
- Education: University of the Western Cape; University of Natal
- Scientific career
- Workplaces: University of Western Cape University of Witwatersrand; University of Bristol University of Limpopo

Zodwa Dlamini is a South African biochemist and Ex-deputy Vice Chancellor for Research at the Mangosuthu University of Technology. She researches molecular oncology. She is a former Vice President of the South African Medical Research Council and is a member of the Council for Scientific Advisers for the International Centre for Genetic Engineering and Biotechnology.

== Early life and education ==
Dlamini was born in the KwaZulu-Natal North Coast. She worked as an administration clerk in provincial health before starting a degree in pharmacy. She was not happy, and switched to Biochemistry and Microbiology, earning bachelor's degrees at the University of the Western Cape. She moved to the University of Natal for her Master's and PhD.

== Career ==
After her PhD, Dlamini returned to the University of the Western Cape as a postdoctoral fellow in molecular oncology. In 2002 she joined the University of the Witwatersrand, where she studied the toxicity of traditional African beer. In 2007 she was awarded a National Cancer Institute investigator opportunity award. She joined the University of Limpopo as an associate professor in 2014.

She was appointed the lead of the research directorate at the Mangosuthu University of Technology in 2015. In July 2017 Dlamini was confirmed as a member of the Council for Scientific Advisers for the International Centre for Genetic Engineering and Biotechnology. She is a visiting professor at the University of Bristol.

Dlamini is concerned about education within the local community and supports schools in accounting, maths and physics. She believes that Mangosuthu University of Technology can improve the lives of the people in Umlazi. She is a member of the steering committee of the Academy of Science of South Africa's STEM education group.

In 2017 she led a delegation of Mangosuthu University of Technology scientists to the Dublin Institute of Technology. She is interested in precision medicine. Dlamini has contributed to two books about cancer, including Current Immunotherapeutic Treatments in Colon Cancer and South African Herbal Extracts as Potential Chemopreventive Agents: Screening for Anticancer Splicing Activity. Her current research looks at abnormal MicroRNA in cancers associated with HIV. The project received R6 million over three years from the South African Medical Research Council.
