= Top Billing (magazine) =

South African magazine

Top Billing magazine
- Jo Ann Strauss Cover
- Editor: Basetsana Kumalo
- Categories: Lifestyle magazine
- Frequency: Monthly
- Circulation: 21,434
- First issue: June 2004
- Company: Tswelopele Productions
- Country: South Africa
- Language: English,
- Website: Top Billing.com

In March 2004, the South African television show Top Billing announced that it would launch a magazine version of the lifestyle programme. In June 2004, Top Billing magazine was being sold nationwide for R19.95. The Top Billing magazine contains celebrity interviews, behind-the-scenes previews, fashion, food, travel and entertainment news of local and international status.
