= Zodwa Dlamini =

South African scientist and educationalist

- Born: 1963 (age 62–63)
- Education: University of Fort Hare University of Iowa University of Zululand

Zodwa Dlamini (born 1963) is a South African scientist and former Republic of South Africa Chief Delegate for the Lesotho Highlands Water Commission.

== Early life and education ==
Dlamini grew up in the Free State province of South Africa and was educated in the Bantu Education system. She completed her Bachelor's degree at the University of Zululand and an Honors degree from the University of Fort Hare. She was one of hundreds of the African students who attended a US university in the 1980s on a scholarship aimed at identifying leaders of government, education and business post-Apartheid. She received the Southern African Scholarship Program set up by James Freedman, President at the University of Iowa. She moved to Iowa in 1985, starting a Master's degree in Geography. During her degree she worked in the University of Iowa Office of Affirmative Action and cleaned houses. She formed a band (Imilonji) with five other students from South Africa who would perform around campus, in churches and the local hospital. Dlamini remained at the University of Iowa for her PhD, researching the education of homeless children in South Africa, and graduated in 1992.

== Career ==
Dlamini returned to South Africa in 1993 and voted in the 1994 South African election - the first non-racial democratic election. She was appointed head of the Northern Cape Province Education Department. She left in 1996 to form her own consultancy, advising governmental agencies in rural development and education. In 2005 she was appointed Republic of South Africa Chief Delegate for the Lesotho Highlands Water Commission.

In October 2015 Nomvula Mokonyane removed Dlamini from her position as Republic of South Africa Chief Delegate for the Lesotho Highlands Water Commission. This was a controversial decision - Dlamini has over ten years experience in water management, and Mokonyane and the African National Congress have a relationship with the newly recruited LTE Consulting. There were no explanations given for her removal.
