= Siboniso Gumede =

South African footballer

Personal information
- Full name: Siboniso Gumede
- Date of birth: 14 September 1985 (age 41)
- Place of birth: Empangeni, South Africa
- Height: 1.73 m (5 ft 8 in)
- Position: Defender

Youth career
- Hlobane Young Heroes
- Chess FC
- Bright Stars

Senior career*
Years	Team	Apps	(Gls)
2008–2011	AmaZulu		
2011–2014	Bidvest Wits	34	(1)
2014–2015	Black Aces		
2015–2017	Platinum Stars	23	(1)
- * Club domestic league appearances and goals as of 12 January 2022 ‡ National team caps and goals as of 12 January 2022

Siboniso Gumede (born 14 September 1985) is a South African former football player who played as a defender for AmaZulu, Bidvest Wits, Black Aces, and Platinum Stars. He was active from 2008 to 2017 in the Premier Soccer League.
