= Busi Mhlongo =

- Born: Busisiwe Victoria Mhlongo; 28 October 1947; Inanda, South Africa
- Died: 15 June 2010 (aged 62) Durban, South Africa
- Genres: Mbaqanga, soul, smooth jazz, soft rock
- Occupations: Singer-songwriter, record producer
- Years active: 1960–2010
- Labels: House of Memory, MELT2000, Stern Music, Sheer Sound, Chissa Records
- Formerly of: Hugh Masekela; Letta Mbulu; Abigail Kubeka; Miriam Makeba; Caiphus Semenya; Culoe De Song

Busi Mhlongo (28 October 1947 – 15 June 2010), born Victoria Busisiwe Mhlongo, was a singer, dancer and composer originally from Inanda in Natal, South Africa.

== Biography ==
Mhlongo drew on various South African musical styles such as Mbaqanga, Maskanda, Marabi and traditional Zulu, fused with contemporary elements from jazz, funk, rock, gospel, rap, opera, reggae and West African music. Her lyrics carry poignant messages and she had a care-free way of performance that included performing bare-foot.

https://commons.wikimedia.org/wiki/File:Busi_Mhlongo.jpg

In the 1960s, she adopted the artistic name Vickie; only later did she become known by Busi Mhlongo. She was an initiated sangoma, which heavily influenced her music.

In the 1970s, Mhlongo relocated to London, later recording with other South African artists who were living in exile, such as Dudu Pukwana and Julian Bahula. By the 1980s, she was performing with well-renowned international artists such as Salif Keita.

She began releasing her own individual works in the 1990s, with her first album, Barbentu, being released in 1993. A year later, she joined Hugh Masekela's homecoming tour.

https://commons.wikimedia.org/wiki/File:Babhemu.jpg

In 1995, Mhlongo joined Hugh Masekela in the Africa '95 festival in London. In 1998, she released her second album, Urban Zulu, which became a hit in various markets around the world and reportedly spent months in the Billboard World Music charts. She went on to release more albums, Freedom (2003), and Amakholwa before her death from breast cancer in June 2010. Although she's no longer with us, her energetic style of performance remains and can be seen through choreographer Somizi Mhlongo. Her music is a symbolism of the struggle for justice in South Africa. Her vocal range is incredible for she was able to go from a soft note to a booming roar. Due to her powerful activism against apartheid through music, Mhlongo was exiled therefore working and living in the Netherlands, North America and the UK. Busi sold half-a-dozen solo albums. Later during her career she became known as "Mam'Busi". During her youth, she joined the musical King Kong in Durban and was encouraged to play the drums. Her creativity launched her decision to create her band, Twasa. Her style of performance was inspired by Dorothy Masuka and Miriam Makeba, but mostly Princess Magogo.

== Personal life ==
Mhlongo was raised in a musically inclined family in the mountain village of Ohlange. She married drummer Early Mabuza, and they later had a daughter. Due to Mhlongo's exile, she was unable to raise her daughter or attend the funeral of her husband, whose cause of death was murder.

== Discography ==
- Babhemu 1993
- Urban Zulu 1999
- Indiza - Voyages Through New Sounds 2000
- Freedom 2003
- We Baba Omncane 2009

== Awards and nominations ==
Mhlongo was nominated for a Grammy and won three South African Music Awards.
