= Shiyani Ngcobo =

- Born: 1953; Umzinto, KwaZulu-Natal, South Africa
- Died: 2011 (aged 57–58) Durban, South Africa
- Genres: Maskandi
- Occupations: Musician, songwriter
- Instruments: Guitar, Vocals
- Years active: 1989–2011
- Label: World Music Network

Shiyani Ngcobo was a Maskandi guitarist and teacher from South Africa. He toured Denmark, Belgium, Switzerland, Germany, the United States and the United Kingdom during the early 2000s in support of his album Introducing Shiyani Ngcobo becoming a major influence in taking Maskanda music to international audiences. In addition, he taught maskandi guitar at the School of Music of the University of KwaZulu-Natal. He died near Durban on 18 February 2011.

== History ==
=== Early life ===
Shiyani was born in 1953 in the province of KwaZulu-Natal, South Africa. He was born to two members of the Zulu people, and their musical styling would later influence much of his work. When Shiyani was 13 he became fascinated with Maskanda music after his brother, Khetuwise, introduced him to the traditional piece Sevelina. His father was an alcoholic who would frequently beat his mother, which eventually led him to leave home in 1970 and lead the life of a migrant worker throughout South Africa. Eventually he met his life partner Gertrude and settled down in Kwa Makutha near Durban.

=== Beginning of musical career ===
In 1989 Ngcobo won a Maskandi guitar competition at the University of KwaZulu-Natal, where he would teach Maskanda guitar for the rest of his life. After many years, he acquired a manager, leading to concerts in Norway, Cameroon and Malaysia.

=== Rise in Europe and America ===
At the Rainforest World Music Festival in Malaysia, Ngcobo caught the eye of producer Ben Mandelson who recorded several demo tracks that ended up on a BBC Radio 3 session. These demo tracks led to Mandelson traveling to South Africa to help Ngcobo record Introducing Shiyani Ngcobo, his only album, which was released in 2004. In support of this album, Ngcobo embarked on a European tour that featured stops in the United Kingdom, Germany, Denmark, Belgium and Switzerland. In 2007, Ngcobo made his one and only trip to the United States, where he played a concert at Carnegie Hall.

=== Death ===
Ngcobo died in his home outside Durban on 18 February 2011. Despite his high profile, he lived a very humble life and when he died, his daughter Khanyisile had to go on the radio to solicit for funds to help pay for the funeral. He was later included in the World Music Network's compilation The Rough Guide to African Guitar Legends, which came out on 15 March 2011.

== Musical style ==
Ngcobo was known for using his songs to give a picture of the life of a Zulu migrant worker and used the lyrics of his songs to examine themes of broken families, loss and masculinity in a constantly changing culture. Dr. Kathryn Olsen wrote of his style that Ngcobo, "asserts a version of masculinity that derives meaning from the experience of dispersal resulting from conquest and domination." Musically, he blended drums of the ngoma dance style with a more traditional Maskanda guitar style. Unlike many of his compatriots, Ngcobo resisted the use of electronic drum kits and synthesizers, instead using a more minimalistic and traditional style of a single acoustic guitar and bass. On occasion, Ngcobo would also play a rudimentary instrument made out of a 5-litre oil can, wood, wire and nails known as an igogogo. These sounds came together to create what was called a "more intimate aesthetic" than many other contemporary Maskanda guitarists. Ngcobo himself referred to his style of playing as "the guitar that speaks."

== Discography ==
- Introducing Shiyani Ngcobo (2004)
