= Chris Ngcobo =

Chris Ngcobo was the acting head of Intelligence for the South African Police Service from 26 June 2012 to 22 October 2013.

== Career ==
Ngcobo joined the South African Police Service (SAPS) service in 1994 and was promoted through various ranks. He held the rank of Major General at the time of his appointment and was recognised for excellence in his work and received various medals.

He also held a position as the head of protection services in the Free State.

He replaced Richard Mdluli.

== Suspension ==
National police commissioner General Riah Phiyega made the announcement on 22 October 2013. It was a "huge sense of disappointment" that discrepancies were discovered in Ngcobo's official records and qualifications.
