= Ayanda Thabethe =

South African television presenter (born 1986)

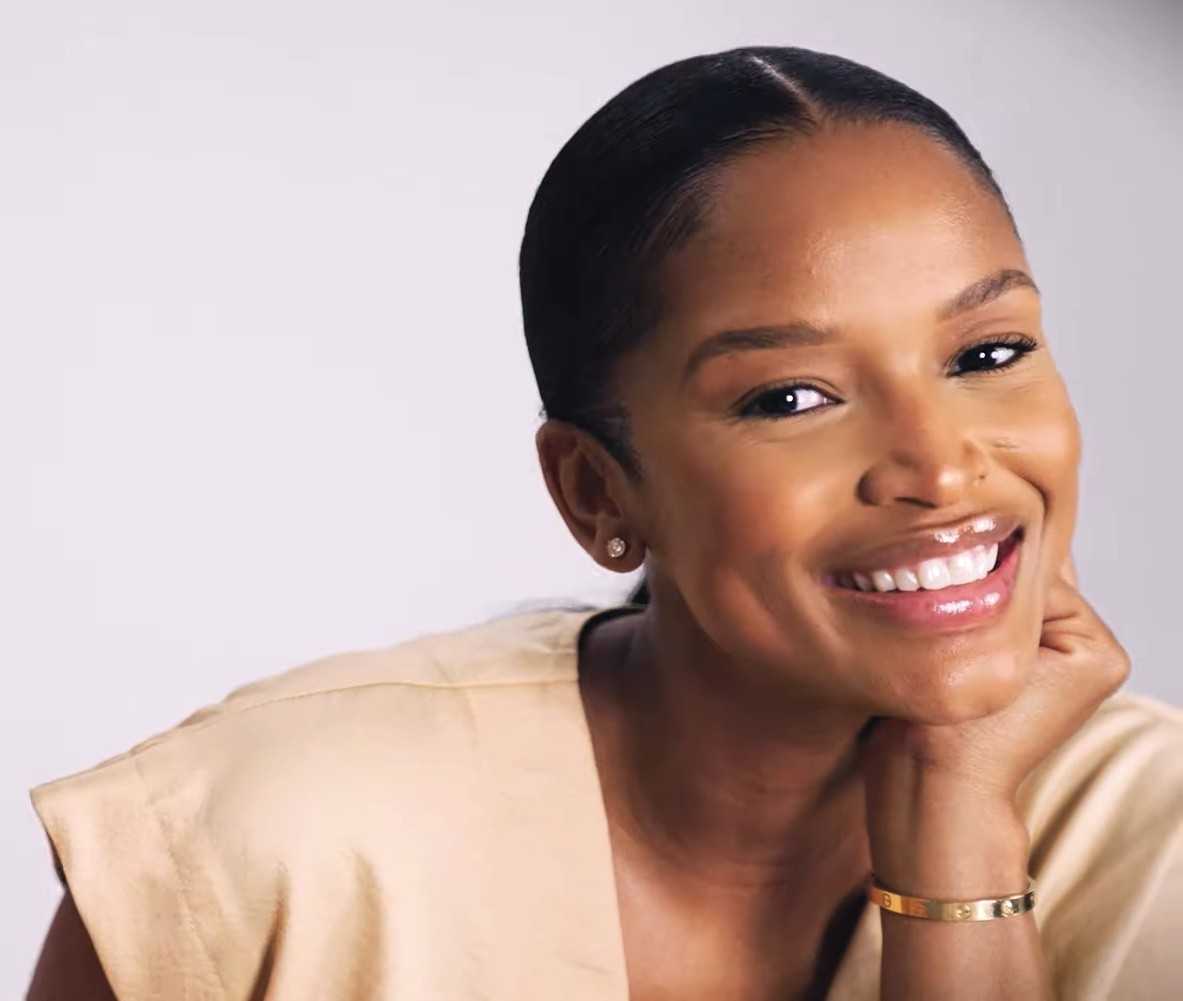
- Thabethe in 2022
- Born: Ayanda Thabethe; 17 March 1986 (age 40); KwaZulu-Natal, South Africa
- Other name: Ayanda Matsimbe
- Education: University of Pretoria; University of South Africa; Henley Business School
- Occupations: Television presenter; entrepreneur; model
- Years active: 2012–present
- Spouse: Andile Ncube (m. 2014; div. 2016) Peter Matsimbe (m. 2025)

Ayanda Thabethe (born 17 March 1986) is a South African television presenter, model, and entrepreneur. She is best known as a host on the lifestyle and entertainment show Top Billing and BET A-List. She founded her own marketing agency namely Buzzworthy Production in 2011.

Thabethe is also known for her appearances on Expresso and Celebrity Night Games on BET Africa. She has worked as a brand ambassador for several notable brand including Pond's, L’Oréal, Johnnie Walker, Vodacom and more.

== Early life ==
Thabethe was born on 17 March 1986, KwaZulu-Natal, South Africa and she was by a single parent, a mother after her parents divorced when she was.

Thabethe did her matric at Sacred Girls High School and attentend the University of Pretoria where she graduated in 2007 with a degree in Bachelor of Commerce in Communication Management. In 2011, she received an honours degree in Marketing from the University of South Africa. She enrolled from Henley Business School where she obtained Master of Business Administration in 2025.

== Career ==
=== Television ===
Thabethe's first television role was co-hosting Top Billing's Top Entertainment program in November 2012, with rapper AKA. In July 2016, she made her acting debut in Mzansi Magic telenovela Rockville season 4 playing the role of stripper Aliyah. In the fall of 2016 she became the co-host of the BET Africa program A-List, with Nandi Madida. She co-hosted the program into 2017. In March 2017, Thabethe became a presenter on the SABC3 lifestyle program Top Billing, displaying the life of the country's rich.

She appeared in several television shows including Tooth and Nails as pregnant teenager, Generations: The Legacy as Gugu and Acting Zion playing the supporting role of a Detective. Later that year, she became a host for Ayanda’s Fashion House season 1. She co-hosted in E! show Celebrity Game Night South Africa edition with Anele Mdoda and Jason Goliath in 2019. The following year in 2020, she begged another hosting gig in a lifestyle show Africa Modern. In 2022, Thabethe hosted Afrimaxx Pan African lifestyle show on Home Channel.

=== Other ventures ===
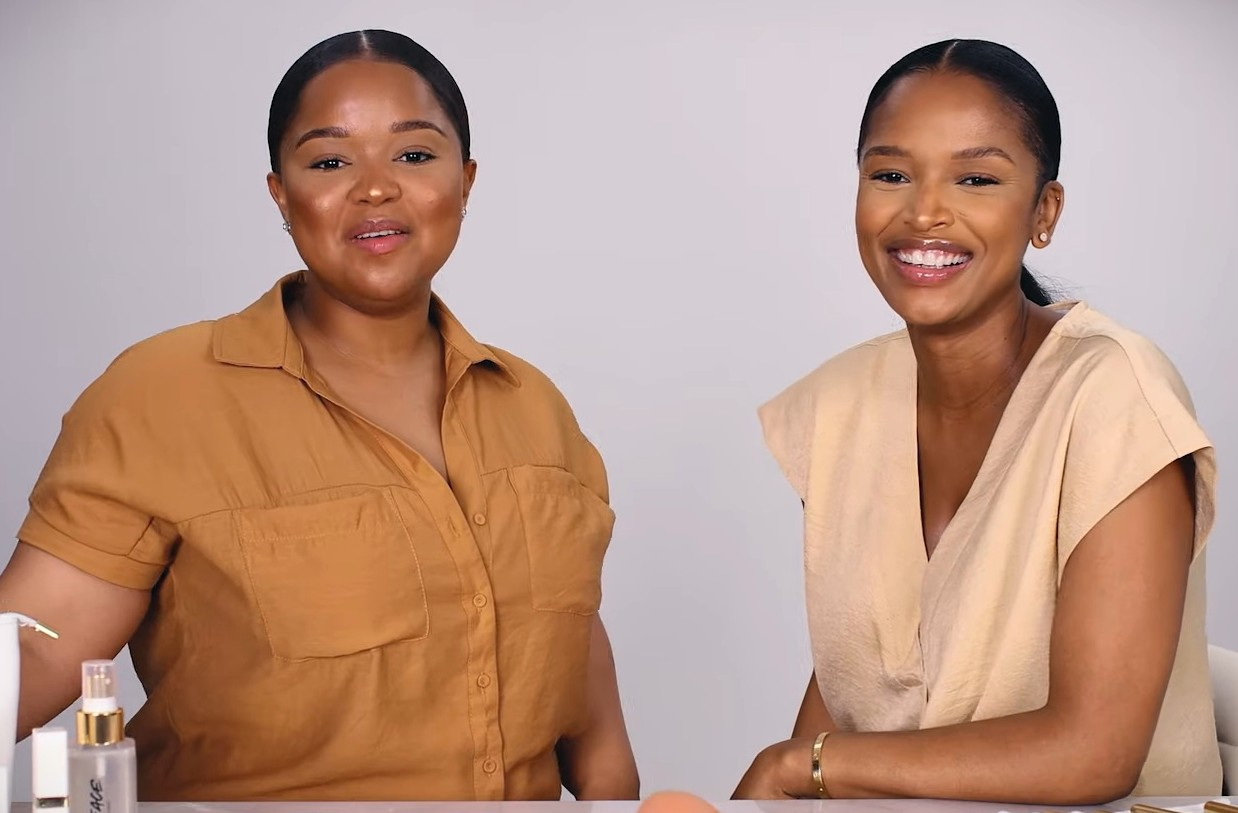
Lungile and Ayanda Thabethe in 2022

Thabethe began his career in 2011 when she founded a marketing firm, "Buzzworthy Production Agency". She upgraded her career where she was leading in commercials and collaborated with notable brands Vodacom and Nissan Leaf in 2012. She was named the brand ambassador for Pond's and L'Oreal.

In 2014, Thabethe opened a hair salon based in Johannesburg named Liyanda Experience. In 2022, she founded a make-up line "Quick Face Beauty" with her sister Lungile Thabethe. She later collaborated with Samsung alongside her sister. In 2024, she had a collaboration with a fashion brand namely FARO Africa, launching an exclusive modern style.

== Personal life ==
In 2014, Thabethe married South African television sport presenter Andile Ncube; they divorced in 2016. In July 2025, she married businessman Peter Matsimbe and currently in a relationship for four years.
