= Zulu music =

South African music genre

The Zulu people are a South African ethnic group. Many Zulu musicians have become a major part of South African music, creating a huge influence in the music industry. A number of Zulu-folk derived styles have become well known across South Africa and abroad. Zulu music has dominated many genres in South Africa, especially house music, folk music, acapella, choral music and gospel. In fact, some of the most popular songs from South Africa are in isiZulu.

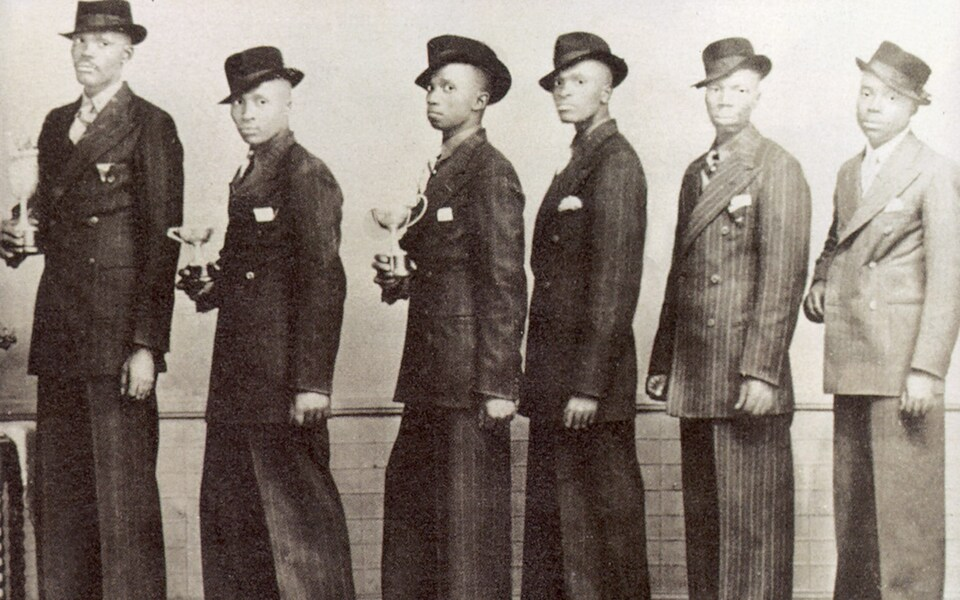
Solomon Linda's Original Evening Birds formed in 1933, pictured in 1941.

== Mbube and Isicathamiya ==
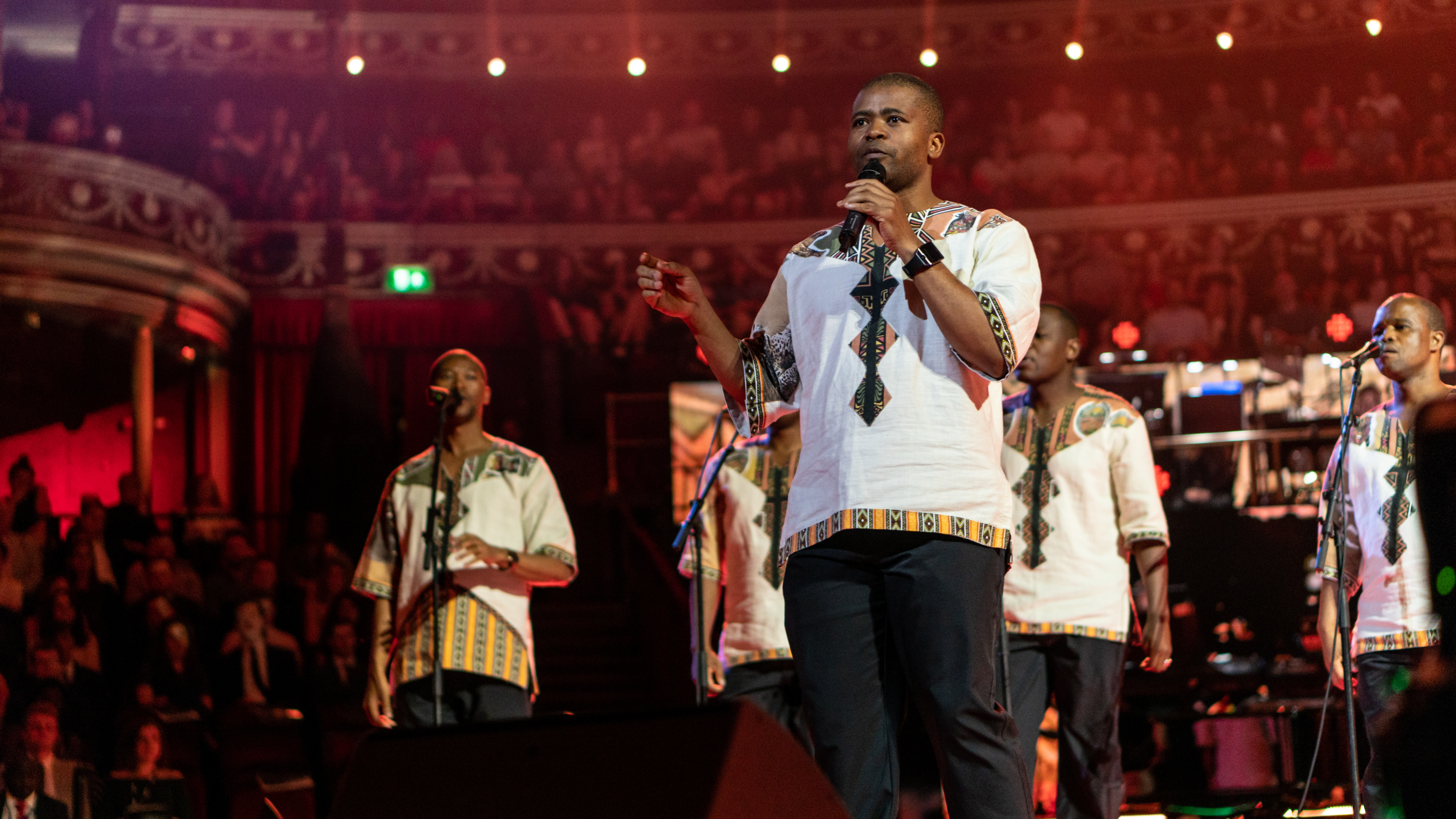
Ladysmith Black Mambazo (2018)

Mbube is both a song, originally released in the 1940s by Solomon Linda, and a genre of South African popular music that was inspired by it. "Mbube" was recorded in 1939 and became a major hit in the country. The song was in a traditional Zulu choral style, which soon came to the attention of American musicologist Alan Lomax, who brought to the song to folk singer Pete Seeger, then of The Weavers. They made the song a Top 15 American hit in 1952 (as "Wimoweh"), though creator Solomon Linda was not credited; later, The Kingston Trio released a cover of it. Later still, The Tokens turned the song into "The Lion Sleeps Tonight", and it became a #1 American hit. The Durban-based Ladysmith Black Mambazo, formed by Joseph Shabalala in 1960, sings, among other styles, music in the mbube tradition inclusive of isicathamiya.

== Mbaqanga ==
Mbaqanga is a vibrant South African music genre that emerged in the early 1960s, famously known as “township jive.” Its name, which means "everyday cornmeal porridge" in Zulu, reflects its role as a cultural staple for urban Black South Africans. It was developed in township shebeens (informal venues), notably around Sophiatown and Soweto, it quickly became a dominant form of Black urban music across South Africa and neighbouring countries. Even after the rise of other genres, Mbaqanga remains influential in modern South African music, continuing to inspire artists and resonate at cultural gatherings.

== Maskandi ==
Maskanda (or Maskandi) is a kind of Zulu folk music that is evolving with South African society. Ethekwini Online describes it as "The music played by the man on the move, the modern minstrel, today’s troubadour. It is the music of the man walking the long miles to court a bride, or to meet with his Chief; a means of transport. It is the music of the man who sings of his real life experiences, his daily joys and sorrows, his observations of the world. It’s the music of the man who’s got the Zulu blues."

== Kwaito ==
Kwaito is a music genre that emerged in Johannesburg, South Africa, during the 1980s. It is a variant of house music featuring the use of African sounds and samples. Typically at a slower tempo range than other styles of house music, Kwaito often contains catchy melodic and percussive loop samples, deep bass lines, and vocals. Despite its similarities to hip hop music, Kwaito has a distinctive manner in which the lyrics are sung, rapped and shouted. American producer Diplo has described Kwaito as "slowed-down garage music," most popular among the black youth of South Africa. Variants are Durban kwaito and future kwaito.

== Kasi rap ==
Kasi rap, primarily using isiZulu and isiXhosa for rap vocal delivery, centered on themes such as overcoming adversity, family dynamics, and aspirations for a better life. Pro (formerly Pro Kid) played a pivotal role in the genre. Driemanskap emerged as a standout group in this movement, alongside notable artists like Maxhoseni, Kanyi, Red Button, Manelisi, and Deep Soweto.

== Gqom ==
Gqom is a style of music that emerged a decade into the 21st century from the city of Durban in KwaZulu Natal, South Africa. The style features wavy and bass beats produced with software such as FL Studio, and has gained prominence in London. The word gqom, sometimes expressed as qgom, igqom, gqomu or variants thereof, derives from an onomatopoeic combination of click consonants from the Zulu language that represents a hitting drum. Music industry professionals who were actively and rigorously involved in influencing the masses to accept and embrace the new, shift-shaping sound included the likes of South African rapper, Okmalumkoolkat, Italian record label Gqom Oh owner, Nan Kole, Afrotainment record label owner, DJ Tira as well as event curator and personal public relations liaison, Cherish LaLa Mankai. Related artists are DJ Lag, DJ Bongz, Lord The Dj, MasterT, Dj Noffoh, Dj Nkaa, Rudeboyz, Distruction Boyz & AudioBoyz.

=== Gqom trap ===
Gqom trap, a fusion of gqom and trap music elements, emerged in the 2010s through the innovation of Durban hip hop group Witness The Funk.

== African Trap Music (ATM) ==
African Trap Music, often abbreviated as ATM, emerged as a subgenre of trap music in 2015. Its inception is attributed to Emtee's breakout single "Roll Up". Leading the genre were artists such as Emtee, Sjava, and Saudi, with significant contributions also from Sims, Ranks, Just G, and producer Ruff. African Trap Music combines trap production with distinct South African influences. Lyrically, it explores narratives and themes such as love, survival, success, and family dynamics, drawing inspiration from South African genres. The majority of lyrics are sung in South African languages, predominantly IsiZulu.

== Amapiano ==
Amapiano, an isiZulu word loosely translated to "the pianos", is a South African subgenre of house music that emerged in South Africa in the mid-2010s. It is a hybrid of deep house, gqom, jazz, and lounge music characterized by synths and wide percussive basslines. Associated musical acts are Kabza de Small, DJ Sumbody, Mpura, Kamo Mphela and Focalistic. Amapiano sample packs often incorporate sounds taken from gqom music.

== See also ==
- Ndebele music
- Tswana music
- Xhosa music
