= Maskandi =

South African music genre

- Other names: Maskanda; Zulu blues
- Stylistic origins: marabi; performance poetry; Zulu folk music; talking blues
- Cultural origins: 1920s - 1930s South Africa(KwaZulu-Natal) and Rhodesia
- Typical instruments: finger pick; concertina; violin; mouth organ; singing; jaw harp; acoustic guitar; drums

Other topics
- mbube; Zulu music; isicathamiya

Maskandi (also Maskanda) is a form of Zulu folk music, originally associated with migrant workers, that is evolving with South African society. Thought to be pioneered by Phuzushukela (John Bhengu). Often characterised by a picking guitar style which draws on a variety of historical influences it also has an important social function with players being given sanction to publicly criticise powerful people.

== Origins ==
The music originated in "female gourd-resonated monochord songs that were transferred and given an acoustic life on guitar". The roots of what is today called maskandi have been traced back to non-guitar based forms of music in the 1920s, with the shift to guitar beginning in Rhodesia in the 1930s with a group of musicians inspired by the music in Western films. It was then developed by migrant workers in South Africa.

== Gender ==
It has been described it as "The music played by the man on the move, the modern minstrel, today's troubadour. It is the music of the man walking the long miles to court a bride, or to meet with his Chief; a means of transport. It is the music of the man who sings of his real life experiences, his daily joys and sorrows, his observations of the world. It's the music of the man who's got the Zulu blues."

Nowadays it is no longer just the exclusive domain of men and women, most notably the late Busi Mhlongo, have become prominent figures within the genre.

== Instrumentation and traditions ==
Maskandi is typically played on cheap, portable instruments, or modern instruments tuned or produced to imitate the polyphonic sounds of the old instruments. Traditionally, a Maskandi musician had one song, a long one that evolved as the story of the musician's life grew. Nowadays albums may contain the usual 10-14 tracks, some of which though may still be over the three-minute mark. Although there are several variations of Maskandi, the instrumental ensemble typically remains the same in all variations. This is deliberately done to keep the unique sound. When listening to Maskandi, these are the typical instruments to be heard:

- Concertina, "Inkostin'" or "Inkostina" (Typically a 20 button Anglo concertina, tuned to G/C and played Maskandi style). A common misconception some people make is to identify a concertina as an accordion. An accordion is mostly found in Sotho music, and is much larger in size than a Concertina. The tone produced by the Concertina is also much brighter and higher pitched.
- Acoustic Guitar, "Isginci". In "every" Maskandi band is an acoustic guitar played in a unique rhythmic picking pattern. The guitar is also the instrument that leads the entire band, and all elements need to blend in with the guitar's setup, this can include adjusting tuning, key and other aspects of the accompanying instruments. Typically the thumb and index fingers are used when playing Maskandi technique, and it is widely known that Maskandi guitar is one of the most difficult techniques to learn and master as a guitarist. In most cases, Maskandi guitarist are also the lead singer or front man of the band. The most notable difference with the Maskandi guitar technique, is the way in which the guitar is tuned. A true Maskandi guitarist is typically fiercely protective of their tuning, as this forms a significant part of identifying the band/guitarist. To be able to play the Maskandi guitar or the song of another Maskandi guitarist, you would need to first figure out the tuning of that guitar and then figure out all of the licks and possible riff phrasing combinations that make a musical melody or rhythm. Because of this, Maskandi guitarists are typically very technically advanced as well as extremely competitive, albeit rarely formally trained in music and guitar. As the complexity of the tuning and licks increases, so does the reputation and respect of the guitarist.
- Bass Guitar, "uBhesi" or "amaBhesi" or "emaBhesini". Also, the heartbeat of the Maskandi song, the unique sound of Maskandi also relies heavily on the correctness and technical application of the bass work. Maskandi bass serves as the source of the groove of the song. It is typically played in a very aggressive manner and sounds best when played with emotion and soul.
- Keyboards/Synth
- Drums
- Backing Vocalists, "Abavumayo". Backing vocalists are an extremely important element in Maskandi music, basically no Maskandi song is complete without there being backing vocalists. Given that Maskandi is a very soulful and deeply personal genre, the backing vocalists responsibility is to create and set the tone and overall mood of a Maskandi song. "Ukuvuma ingoma", literally means to sing along in agreement with what the lead vocalist is singing. The backing vocalists also carry deep secrets in how a Maskandi song is arranged and sequenced and are therefore as equally important as the other accompanying elements. The vocal riffs are usually intentionally complicated and include a lot of unconventional phrasing. The extensive use of legato and sharp notes makes the riffs unique to the Maskandi genre. Typically a Maskandi lead or backing singer should have a solid understanding of the concepts of musical key, harmony as well as good rhythm/timing. Given the emphatic singing style, it is also important for a Maskandi singer to have developed lung capacity and demonstrate a good breathing technique.

== Musical style ==
A traditional Maskandi song is distinguished by an instrumental flourish ("izihlabo"), typically played on the acoustic guitar or the concertina, that sets the tone at the beginning of each song. Izihlabo are also an introduction of sorts, and serve the purpose of allowing the guitarist to showcase/show off their level of skill by capturing the listeners' attention. Given that traditional Maskandi guitarists tune their guitars differently, listening to izihlabo also provides a way for the listener to tell with certainty the identity of the guitarist/band. Izihlabo are typically rapidly played notes, that do not necessarily make up a melody or explicit rhythm. Playing izihlabo can also be likened to an actor getting into character.

In a Maskandi song, there will typically be rapidly spoken sections of Zulu praise poetry, called "izibongo". The content is not always praise, though, and with pop, house and other influences colouring Maskandi, it has become more about the storytelling ethic and the modern migrant culture, than simply about the musical style. Another key element of Maskandi music is the lead singer's natural personality. In Maskandi music, it is not uncommon for songs to "sound the same", yet the music consumption does not necessarily decrease. Fundamentally Maskandi is about telling stories and providing a window to the lead singer's soul. It is largely about the message carried in the songs and music, and this is why it is considered the same as listening to soul or blues music. Early 2000s there was a new artist introduced called Mtshengiseni Gcwensa (late) who started music with his friend Mgqumeni Khumalo (late). They both introduced many styles in this industry which made upcoming artists look up to them.

Composer Darius Brubeck described the maskandi as "a performer of neo-traditional Zulu instrumental music. Etymologically the word derives from the Afrikaans musikante (musicians). KwaZulu Natal, a province of South Africa where I have lived and worked for the past decade, is home to literally thousands of 'Maskandis', who have developed a rich musical repertoire employing a special style of guitar playing."

== Prominent Maskandi Musicians ==
- Imithente
- Izingane ZoMa
- Busi Mhlongo
- Shiyani Ngcobo
- Sipho Mchunu
- Johnny Clegg
- Phuzushukela
- Shwi no Mtekhala
- Mfaz'omnyama
- Bhekumuzi Luthuli
- Shiyani Ngcobo
- Khuzani
- uGatsheni
- Mthandeni SK
- Thokozani Langa
- 14 Shabalala
