= Top Billing (TV programme) =

South African television series

- Genre: Lifestyle; cuisine; travel; entertainment; wedding; home decor; fashion; celebrity
- Country of origin: South Africa
- Original language: English

Production
- Producers: Basetsana Khumalo, Patience Stevens
- Production location: South Africa
- Editor: Hayden Fortmann
- Running time: 60 minutes (approx.)
- Production company: Tswelopele Productions

Original release
- Network: SABC3
- Release: 2 October 1992 – 19 October 2019
- Release: 30 April 2026 – present

Top Billing is a South African lifestyle television programme that aired on SABC3 on Saturday evenings from 18:00–19:00 with repeats on Sundays at 12:00. It was founded by Basetsana Kumalo and Patience Stevens, who own the Tswelopele Production company. The show is the longest-running entertainment and lifestyle programme in South Africa, broadcasting since 1992. In addition to a variety of presenters, there was a voice-over guide throughout the programme. A magazine of the same name was launched in March 2004, containing similar content to the show.

== Content ==
The weekly show has genres of beauty, fashion, food, home decor, travel and weddings. Different local and international celebrities were interviewed each week and a designer home featured as part of the show. International celebrities such as Donald Trump's ex-wife, Ivana Trump, featured on the show, as well as Hollywood actor and Beverly Hills doctor, Dr. Rey. Local celebrities such as rugby player Bryan Habana, singer Tamara Dey and Muvhango actress Ntahbiseng Mphahlele have been given equal attention. Popular events such as awards ceremonies and fashion runway shows were showcased. Presenters travelled to locations around the world and often partook in exclusive activities such as sky-diving, skiing, and scuba-diving. Food and wine pairings were also presented, and exclusive weddings attended.

In 2019 the broadcaster cancelled the show due to high production costs. The last episode aired on 19 October 2019. It was revived on 30 April 2026.

== Presenters ==
- Nico Panagio
- Maps Maponyane
- Jade Hubner
- Lorna Maseko
- Zozibini Tunzi
- Jeannie D
- Ayanda Thabethe
- Jonathan Boynton Lee
- Ryle de Morny
- Fezile Mkhize
- Harmony Katulondi
- Basetsana Khumalo
- Jo-Ann Strauss
- Christopher Jaftha
- Tumisho Masha
- Neil McCarthy
- Michelle Garforth
- Kelly Parkhurst
- Lyndall Jarvis
- Casey B Dolan
- Vanessa Haywood
- Roxy Burger
- Natalie Becker
- Simba Mhere (actor) (deceased)
- Sinazo Cynthia Mini
- Janez Vermeiren
- Bryoni Govender
- Ursula Chikane
- Aidan Bennetts
- Bonang Matheba
- Michael Mol
- Dhiveja Sundrum
- Iminam Tatiya

=== Voice-over artists ===
- Alex Jay
- Kevin Savage
- Phil Wrigt

== Public opinion ==
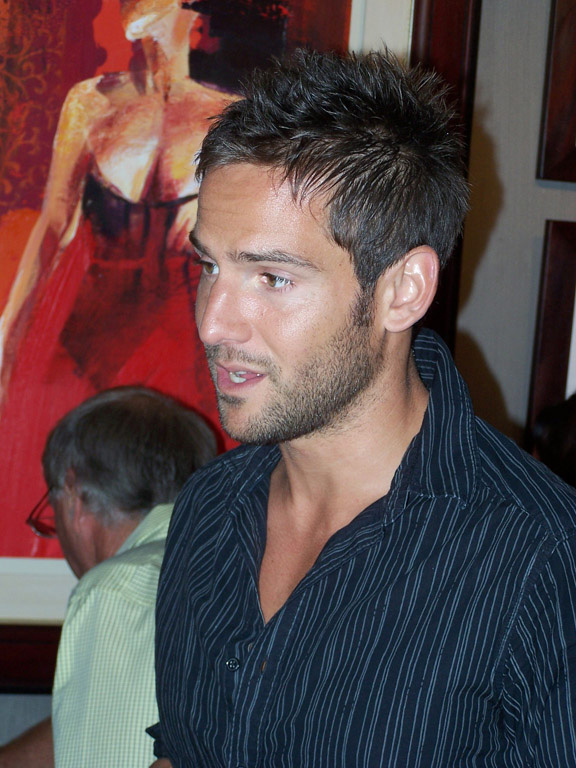
Janez Vermeiren, South African model and Top Billing presenter

People who dislike Top Billing base their hostility on the "questionable ethics" that "dressed presenters will sit down alone to a meal prepared for them in a luxurious setting. This is in a country where people are going hungry..." Others complained that the content featured in the lifestyle programme are unaffordable to the average viewer. On the contrary, Top Billing producers affirmed that the programme was aimed at "giving South Africans hope" that they too can achieve those luxuries that they see on the programme.

== Tswelopele Productions ==
Tswelopele Productions is a production company equally owned by Basetsana Kumalo and Patience Stevens. After the success of Top Billing, Tswelopele also produces other local productions such as Afrikaans lifestyle programme Pasella, SiSwati youth show Ses'khona, travel series Top Travel, Top Dogs and No Reservations.

=== Controversy ===
In 2009, Tswelopele staff members suffered a 10% wage cut for 7 months after Tswelopele waited for SABC to renew their contract. This was accompanied by an 8-day late salary payment, after the company had apparently spent R400,000 expanding their working premises.

In 2017, Tswelopele faced additional controversy when the broadcaster was unable to pay not only Tswelopele but several South African production companies that produced their content. This resulted in salaries being paid late. An article published by ZAlebs stated that the presenters had also not been paid.

== Competition ==
In 2009, M-Net launched a lifestyle programme that was similar in content to that of Top Billing. The M-Net show, All Access, was given the same time slot as Top Billing. Lani Lombard, M-Net's publicist, was reported saying that the show will be "fun-filled, unpretentious and we trust that many M-net viewers who have been watching Top Billing over the years will migrate to All Access". Five seasons of the show were aired on M-Net before it was moved to one of M-Net's sister channels, Mzanzi Magic.
