= Vusi Thanda =

South African actor

- Born: 12 September 1951 (age 74); South Africa
- Occupation: Actor

Vusi Thanda (born 12 September 1951) is a South African actor, best known for his role in the SABC 1 Sitcom Emzini Wezinsizwa as Tshawe.

Vusi Thanda is of a Xhosa background and was born in South Africa.

Thanda was nominated in the Wall of Fame in 2017.

In May 2021, he landed a role starring in the Ikhaya Labadala comedy series, which airs on Netflix.
