= Sello Motloung =

South African actor (1970–2024)

- Born: 4 November 1970; Meadowlands, South Africa
- Died: 15 September 2024 (aged 53)
- Occupations: Actor, presenter, MC
- Years active: 1990–2024

Sello Motloung (4 November 1970 – 15 September 2024) was a South African actor, presenter and MC. He is best known for his roles in television serials such as Backstage, Mamello, and Ring of Lies.

== Personal life ==
Motloung was born on 4 November 1970 in Meadowlands, South Africa.

On 15 September 2024, Motloung’s family released a statement confirming that he had died earlier that day. According to the statement, he collapsed at his home and died upon being taken to the hospital for treatment.

== Career ==
In 1998, he was nominated for the Best Supporting Actor Award at the M-Net All-Africa Film Award for his role in Chikin Biznis. In 2001, he appeared in the fifth season of the SABC1 education drama series Soul City. He apperared as Sgt. Kokobela Bokako on SABC 2 "Nna Sajene Kokobela".Then he played the role "Nkabi" in the SABC3 drama The Lab in 2006. In the same year, he made supporting roles in two more serials: season three of ITV series Wild at Heart with the role "Lungi" and CBC series Jozi-H with the role "Dumisani". In the preceding years, he appeared in many television serials such as; The Long Run, Ollie, Zulu Love Letter, Skilpoppe, Man to Man, Faith's Corner, Jerusalema, Invictus, Chanda's Secrets, Tirza and How to Steal 2 Million. Meanwhile, he played the role "Mpumi" in the e.tv soap opera Backstage.He continued to play the role for 18 months with popularity.

In 2004, he acted in the Canadian mini-series Human Cargo. In 2007, he joined with the SABC1 mini-series After Nine and played the role of "Kutloano Maema". In the same year, he played the lead role in the SABC1 Christmas Eve one hour teledrama Second Chance. In 2012, he played the lead role "David" in the e.tv drama series eKasi: Our Stories. In 2015, he joined with the cast of SABC2 drama Mamello and played the role "Mr Thobejane" for three seasons. In 2016, he joined with Mzansi Magic telenovela Ring of Lies to play the role "Thabelo". He reprised the role in second season in 2017.

Apart from cinema and television, he also made several theatre productions since 1990s, such as; Street Cleaners (1990), The Awakening (1991), The Good Woman of Sharkville (1996), The Cherry Orchard (1997), Master Harold And The Boys (1998), Cold Stone Jug (2004) and Socks & Toothpaste (2006). For his role in the play The Good Woman of Sharkville, he was nominated for a Vita Award for Best Supporting Actor as well.

Before the COVID-19 pandemic, he appeared in the SABC2 telenovela Lithapo where he played the role "Thapelo". After a drought in the drama industry due to the pandemic, he was seeking for new job opportunities. However, in 2021, he got the opportunity to play in the SABC3 telenovela The Estate with the role "Elias Nkosi".

== Filmography ==
Year	Film	Role	Genre	Ref. lppp[--[
1996	Tarzan: The Epic Adventures	Actor	TV series	
1996	La ferme du crocodile	Actor	TV series	
1998	Justice for All	Actor	TV series	
1999	Chikin Biznis	Actor	TV series	
2001	Soul City	Lover	TV series	
2001	The Long Run	Saunders	Film	
2001	Nna Sajene Kokobela	Sgt. Kokobela Bokako	TV Series	
2001	Askari	Sephala Mondisi	Film	
2004	Zulu Love Letter	Policeman 2	Film	
2005	Man to Man	Milos	Film	
2005	Faith's Corner	Security guard	Film	
2006	The Lab	Nkabi	TV series	
2006	Wild at Heart	Lungi	TV series	
2006	Jozi-H	Dumisani	TV series	
2007	Jacob's Cross	Inspector Sithebe	TV series	
2007	After 9	Kutloano Maema	TV series	
2008	Gangster's Paradise: Jerusalema	Detective Modisane	Film	
2009	Invictus	Mandela's Doctor	Film	
2009	The No. 1 Ladies' Detective Agency	Rre Makgothi	TV series	
2009	90 Plein Street	Vivian Letshedi	TV series	
	Backstage	Mpumi Nzima	TV series	
2010	Im Brautkleid durch Afrika	Taonga	TV movie	
2010	Tirza	Taxi Driver	Film	
2011	How to Steal 2 Million	Tembe	Film	
2011	Sokhulu & Partners	Shongwe	TV series	
2011	Home Sweet Home	Clever Red Leader	TV series	
2012	eKasi: Our Stories	David	TV series	
2013	Vuka Mawulele	James Mokgethi	TV series	
2014	Thola	Policeman	TV series	
2014	uSkroef noSexy	Maera Motha	TV series	
2014	Rockville	Police Commissioner	TV series	
	Generations	Caretaker	TV series	
	Isidingo	Bazooka	TV series	
2015	Kota Life Crisis	The Chief Kagiso	TV series	
2015	Mamello	Mr Thobejane / Motsamai Monaheng	TV series	
2015	Matatiele	Motsamai Monaheng	TV series	
	Rhythm City	Hlompho	TV series	
2015	Tempy Pushas	Jimmy	TV series	
2016	Ring of Lies	Thabelo	TV series	
2016	Happiness Is a Four-letter Word	Hadebe	Film	
2017	An Act of Defiance	Nelson Mandela	Film	
2018	The Queen	Superintendent	TV series	
2020	Queen Sono	Guest role	TV series	
2020	Blood Psalms	Ancient Monarch	TV series	
2020	Lithapo	Thapelo	TV series	
2021	The Estate	Elias Nkosi	TV series	
