= Jerry Phele =

South African actor

- Born: 1 July 1956 (age 69); Free State, South Africa
- Occupation: actor
- Years active: 1977–present

Jerry Phele (born 1 July 1956) is a South African Sotho born actor who is most known for acting on Emzini Wezinsizwa as Mofokeng. He has also starred on other notable TV series such as Skwizas and The Throne.

Phele was a candidate for the African Content Movement in the 2019 South African general election.

In 2021, he bagged a role on season 2 of Abomama television series.

Phele joined Smoke and Mirrors in March 2024.
