= Siyabonga Thwala =

South African actor

- Born: Siyabonga Thwala; 8 September 1969 (age 56); Umlazi, Durban, KwaZulu-Natal, South Africa
- Occupation: Actor
- Years active: 1989- present
- Works: Isibaya
- Spouse: Thandi Thwala

Siyabonga Thwala (born 8 September 1969) is a South African actor, businessman, television presenter, producer. He is best known for his role of Mpiyakhe Zungu on Mzansi Magic's Isibaya. Siyabonga Thwala has starred and appeared in a number of high profile television shows in South Africa winning multiple awards for his acting.

He starred as newspaper publisher Vusi Zwane opposite Luthuli Dlamini on e.tv's Scandal! when the first went on air in 2005, a role that would earn him his first South African Film and Television Award. In 2007 he joined the cast of Generations as Paul Mashaba opposite Seputla Sebogodi. Siyabonga Thwala also portrayed the character of Busani Mojalefa on Muvhango and briefly returned to e.tv as DH Radebe on Rhythm City opposite Jamie Bartlett. In 2018 he created and hosted a documentary series, Yobe (a Zulu word for "forgive").

== Career ==
Thwala began his acting career in 1989. He made his screen acting debut in the 1996 made-for-TV movie Born Free: A New Adventure. In the same year, he played a cameo in an episode of the television series Tarzan: The Epic Adventures entitled “Tarzan and the Scarlet Diamond” (Season 1, Episode 5). In 1998 he was offered the role of Godlieb Mofokeng in the SABC 3 soapie Isidingo but turned it down, as he felt he was not ready for a long-term commitment to television. Shortly after, he was cast on TV sitcom Streaks based on a Cape Town hair salon, where he acted alongside Themba Ndaba. In 2003 he was cast in the recurring role of Jimmy on Gazlam.

Thwala rose to fame through his role as Vusi Zwane on the e.tv soap opera, Scandal!. His role went on to earn him a Golden Horn Award (South African Film and Television Award) for Best Actor in a TV Soap.

In 2007, he was cast in the role of Paul Mashaba, the journalist younger brother of ruthless businessman Kenneth Mashaba played by Seputla Sebogodi, on SABC 1's Generations. He left the show in 2010.

In 2013, he earned what is arguably the biggest role of his career as taxi boss Mpiyakhe Zungu on Mzansi Magic's highly acclaimed Isibaya. The role of Mpiyakhe Zungu became so well loved by viewers that, for most of the show's run, the character remained the central figure around whom the story was written. The role earned him the 2014 South African Film and Television Award for Best Actor in a TV Drama.

Thwala joined the cast of Muvhango in a leading role as Busani Mojalefa. In the same year he appeared on e.tv's Rhythm City as DH Radebe. He also appeared on the HIV/AIDS drama series Intersexions winning him his 2nd South African Film and Television Award in 2014 for Best Actor in TV drama.

Thwala created and hosted a documentary series, Yobe, which sought to unite victims and perpetrators - helping them reach a point of understanding and forgiveness. In 2019, he was cast in the award-winning political drama-thriller The Republic as corrupt former president Hendrik, starring alongside Florence Masebe and Hlomla Dandala.

== Awards ==
- 2007 South African Film and Television Awards for Best Actor in a TV Soap (Scandal!)
- 2014 South African Film and Television Awards for Best Actor in a TV Soap (Isibaya)
- 2014 South African Film and Television Awards for Best Actor in TV Drama Series (Intersexions)
- 2014 Royalty Soapie Awards for Outstanding actor in Soap (Isibaya)

=== National Film and Television Awards ===
Year	Nominee / work	Award	Result	Ref.
2024	Himself	Best Actor 2024	Nominated	
2024	Himself	Best Actor in a TV Series 2024	Nominated	
