= Nokukhanya Bhengu =

South African anti-apartheid activist (1904–1996)

- Image of Bhengu from her family
- Born: 3 March 1904; Umngeni, Colony of Natal
- Died: 16 December 1996 (age 92); KwaZulu-Natal, South Africa
- Burial place: Congregational Church, Groutville, KwaZulu-Natal, South Africa
- Education: Ohlange Institute; Inanda Seminary School; Adams College
- Occupations: teacher, farmer, women’s leader and anti-apartheid activist
- Spouse: Albert Luthuli (m. 1927)
- Children: 7, including Albertina Luthuli
- Awards: Organisation of African Unity

Nokukhanya Bhengu (3 March 1904 – 16 December 1996) was a South African teacher, farmer, women’s leader and anti-apartheid activist. She launched a Groutville branch of the women's cooperative the Daughters of Africa (DOA), joined the African National Congress (ANC) and was a representative of the African National Congress Women's League (ANCWL). She was married to Albert Luthuli, who was president of the ANC between 1952 and 1967 and was called "Mother of the Nation" by Nelson Mandela.

== Early life and education ==
Bhengu was born in March 1904 at the Umngeni American Board Congregationalist Mission, near Durban, in the British Colony of Natal. Her parents were Maphitha Bhengu, son of Ndlokolo Bhengu (the chief of the Ngcolosi people), and his wife Nozincwadi Ngidi from Mzinyathi, making Bhengu a member of the royal family of the Ngcolosi. In a letter to the editor of Ilanga in 1957, she called out her royal paternal ancestors: "intombi kaMaphitha, oyisokanqangi lika Ndlokolo kaNkungu kaMepho kaNgwane kaLamula."

Bhengu's family were amakholwa (African Christian) and she had five older siblings. Her sister Nomhlatuze Bhengu was one of the first black nurses trained at McCord’s Hospital and was employed at Grey’s Hospital in Pietermaritzburg. Behngu's mother died in 1914 and when her father remarried, she went to live with her elder brother.

Bhengu began her education at the Ohlange Institute, Inanda, KwaZulu-Natal, then studied at the Inanda Seminary School, an American Board Mission school for girls. One of her teachers at the Inanda Seminary recommended her to Adams College, Amanzimtoti, for a teachers training course. After completing her teacher training, in 1922 Bhengu began to teach at Mpushini, Eshowe, near Pietermaritzburg. When educator and social worker Sibusisiwe Violet Makhanya left her teaching position at Adams College in 1923, the administration invited Bhengu to replace her. Whilst teaching, Bhengu also worked at the Adams Hostel for Girls.

== Marriage ==
In 1925, Bhengu met Albert John Luthuli, then a fellow teacher at Adams College, who taught Zulu history, Zulu music and literature. On 19 January 1927, after discussions between their families, they married and Bhengu moved to live with his family in Groutville in the KwaZulu-Natal province. They had seven children together, three sons and four daughters, including the politician and medical doctor Albertina Luthuli. Bhengu was known for raising her children with an expectation that they all did the same tasks regardless of their gender.

Bhengu had to leave her job after her marriage as Adams College did not allow married women to teach. As black people could not purchase land near Adams College, she lived in Groutville about eighty miles away, while her husband remained at his teaching post and sent money home to support his family. Bhengu supplemented this income by growing and selling vegetables, sugar cane and fruit. When World War II caused rice shortages she taught women how to produce rice.

In 1933, Bhengu's husband was asked to succeed his uncle, Martin Luthuli, as chief of the Umvoti River Reserve. After deliberating for two years, he accepted, and was able to move to live permanently in Groutville with Bhengu and their family. He commenced his duties in 1936. Both Bhengu and Luthuli rejected corruption, and when fraud caused issues at the local post office, Bhengu set up a post office in the Luthuli home and delivered letters on foot. Local women in Groutville often spoke to Bhengu for advice on farming, raising their children and relating to their mother-in-law according to Zulu custom.

== Activism ==
In the 1930s, Bhengu launched a Groutville branch of the women's cooperative the Daughters of Africa (DOA) and she was a member of a Congregational mothers’ union group.

Bhengu became active in the South African anti-apartheid movement and joined the ANC, later reflecting that "I have always treasured the decision I made to throw in my lot with you all in the African National Congress who wish to see Africa become free." In 1946, her husband was elected to the Natives Representative Council (NRC), an advisory body to the government, through a by-election. He was elected president general of the ANC in 1952, supported by the ANC Youth League (ANCYL), and with Nelson Mandela elected as his deputy. As her husband rose in political organisations, Bhengu founded the Cato Manor Women’s Society and became a supporter of the Women's Enfranchisement Association of the Union (WEA), founded by Charlotte Maxeke and Emily Hobhouse. She exchanged letters with equal rights activists across the globe, such as the American philanthropist Mary Louise Hooper, who was her friend and correspondent for decades.

In 1953, Bhengu's husband was banned for a year by the government, prohibiting him from attending any political or public gatherings and from entering any major South African cities. It was the first of four banning orders that Luthuli would receive as president general of the ANC. He was arrested in 1956, charged with treason. Bhengu served as his representative during this period, couriered messages from him to other banned ANC members, and managed local and international knowledge of his legal status. Bhengu also campaigned in her own right and members of her local ANC Lower Tugela Branch elected her as their delegate to the Forty-Third Annual Conference of the ANC, held in Bloemfontein during December 1955. She addressed the conference, encouraged delegates to "make Africa, often called a "Dark Continent", a continent of light," and called for South Africa to have "freedom in a civilized world." She also continued to farm and was the primary breadwinner for the family.

When King Cyprian Bhekuzulu of the royal family in Durban announced his support for apartheid passes in the mid 1950s, Bhengu and nine other representative women of the African National Congress Women's League (ANCWL) travelled to rural Nongoma to meet with him and urge him to oppose the pass laws. When passes became required by black women in 1956, she again campaigned, later explaining that "we women were fighting against the denigration of our humanity. We had seen what happened to our menfolk who had to carry passes and we did not want the same to happen to us."

In 1960, Bhengu joined politician and activist Mewa Ramgobin in participating in a five-day fast, in the Gandhian tradition, in protest of the Sharpeville massacre and subsequent banning of anti-apartheid organisations by the state, including the ANC. She is known to have "prayed that day for those who suffer on our behalf."

In 1961, Bhengu's husband was awarded the Nobel Peace Prize. They both travelled to Norway and he acknowledged his wife in his acceptance speech, delivered at the Great Hall of Oslo University, stating that she richly deserved to share the honour of receiving the prize with him. They used the Nobel prize money to purchase farms in Switzerland which provided shelter for ANC members needing to escape from South Africa. Bhengu would spend time there every year looking after the crops, property and guests.

== Later life ==
Bhengu's husband died in 1967, after being struck by a goods train. Nelson Mandela wrote to her in condolence from prison. Luthuli's funeral was arranged in collaboration with the ANC, fashioned a local and global movement against apartheid, and was televised in the United States. Photographs of Bhengu grieving at her husband's funeral were included in Carol Lazar's 1993 book Women of South Africa: Their Fight for Freedom.

After her husbands death, Bhengu managed his image and historical legacy both nationally and internationally. She organised the archiving of his papers, performed the official unveiling of his tombstone and supported the establishment of Luthuli Memorial Foundation (LMF), serving as one of the trustees with Zami Conco, Mary Louise Hooper and Massabalala Yengwa. Bhengu also remained active in campaigning and civic life, and in 1971 she opened the October convention of the revived Natal Indian Congress, writing later in the 1970s in support of the Congress which was published in their newsletter.

Bhengu was awarded an Organisation of African Unity award in 1974, and attended numerous international events, such as the Soweto Day 1977 in London and the United Church Board for World Ministries in America, as a special guest. In 1981, she opened the inaugural meeting of the Natal Organisation of Women, and publicly spoke out against the renewal of the ban on Robert Sobukwe. She also objected to the proposed removal and resettlement of the Groutville community.

Even when she became unable to walk, Bhengu was still active in the anti-apartheid movement, taking part in a Mass Democratic Movement march in Stanger (KwaDukuza) in 1989. She was also part of the welcome when Nelson Mandela was released from jail. He invited her onto stage during the 1990 rally in King's Park station and said to the crowd of 150,000 people "I have a present for you. I have here with me the Mother of the Nation, Nokukhanya Luthuli. I want you to receive her by shouting loudly and saying "Nokukhanya!" three times." The crowd clapped their hands, raised their voices and shouted in unison, "Nokukhanya!", "Nokukhanya!", "Nokukhanya!"

Shortly before Bhengu's death, in 1996, the first black American consul general, Pamela Bridgewater, travelled to visit her in South Africa.

== Death and legacy ==
Bhengu died in December 1996, days after the new democratic constitution of South Africa was signed into law. She was buried at the Congregational Church in Groutville beside her husband. President Mandela spoke at her funeral, describing her as "Mother of the Nation par excellence." The Luthuli family home is now a living museum.

Bhengu was the subject in a 1989 praise poem Praise to Our Mothers by Gcina Mhlophe, and has also been included in poems by Thoko Remigia Makhanya and Sue Williams.

When President Thabo Mbeki addressed the South African National Conference on Racism in 2000, he shared a direct quote from Bhengu, from shortly before she died: "this simple but profoundly humanist and African wish: My wish before I die, is to see blacks and whites living harmoniously in a united South Africa."
