= Albertina Luthuli =

South African politician

Member of the National Assembly
- In office 2 April 2001 – 1 May 2011

Personal details
- Born: 14 March 1932 (age 94) Groutville, Natal Province; Union of South Africa
- Party: African National Congress
- Relations: Albert Luthuli (father); Nokukhanya Bhengu (mother)
- Education: University of Natal (MBChB)

Albertina Nomathuli Luthuli (born 14 March 1932) is a South African politician and medical doctor who represented the African National Congress (ANC) in the National Assembly from 2004 to 2011. Before that, she served in the KwaZulu-Natal Provincial Legislature. She is the eldest daughter of ANC stalwart Albert Luthuli.

== Early life and career ==
Luthuli was born on 14 March 1932 in Groutville in the former Natal Province. She was the second of seven children born to Albert Luthuli, an ANC stalwart and ultimately a Nobel Peace Prize Laureate who died when he was struck by a train in 1967, and Nokukhanya Bhengu. She attended Adams College and matriculated at St Francis College before enrolling at the University of Natal, where she completed an MBChB.

From 1971 to 1991, during the height of apartheid, she lived in exile in Lesotho, Zimbabwe, and the United Kingdom. When she returned to South Africa in 1991, she opened a medical practice in Natal.

== Post-apartheid political career ==
After the end of apartheid in 1994, Luthuli represented the ANC in the KwaZulu-Natal Provincial Legislature. On 2 April 2001, she was sworn in to the National Assembly to fill a casual vacancy in the ANC's KwaZulu-Natal caucus. In the 2004 general election, she was elected to a full term in the seat. She was re-elected in 2009 but resigned on 1 May 2011; her seat was filled by Duduzile Sibiya.

== Retirement ==
Luthuli lives in her hometown of Groutville. In 2016, she was publicly critical of President Jacob Zuma; she was one of 100 ANC stalwarts who signed an open letter calling for reform in the ANC and she attended several civil society events which protested against decisions of Zuma's administration. She has also called publicly for another inquest into the circumstances of her father's death.
