= Natives Representative Council =

Natives Council in South Africa (1936–1951)

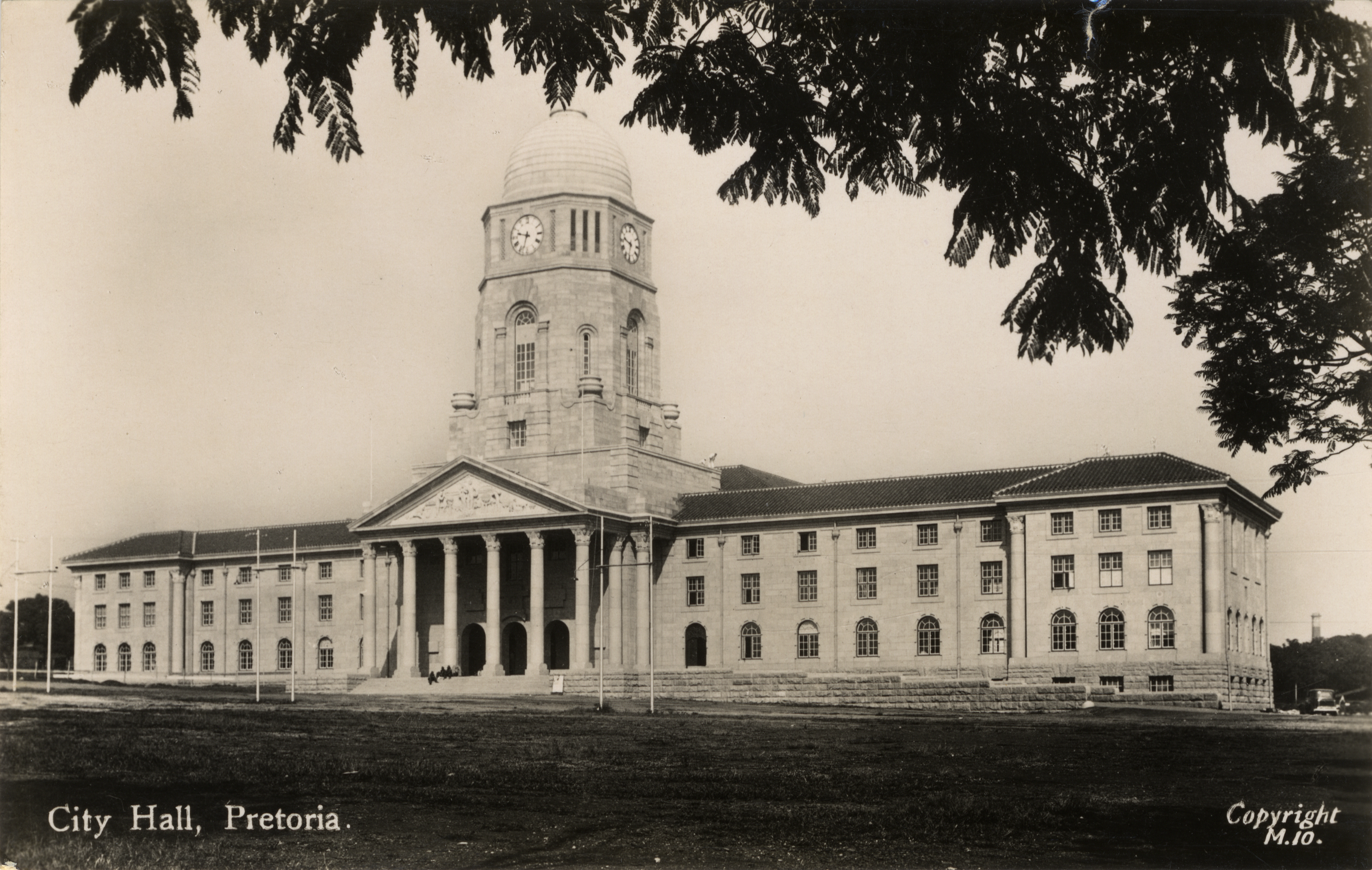
- Pretoria City Hall c. 1920-1940

Type
- Type: Advisory board
- Term limits: None

History
- Founded: 1936
- Disbanded: 1951

Structure
- Seats: 22
- Length of term: 5 years
- Salary: £120/year + per diem

Elections
- First election: 1937
- Last election: 1948

Meeting place
- Multiple, including Pretoria City Hall

The Natives Representative Council (NRC) was an advisory body that existed in South Africa from 1936 to 1951. Its primary function was to provide representation for Black South Africans who had been disenfranchised following the passage of the Representation of Natives Act in 1936. The NRC was established with 22 members. Six white members from the Department of Native Affairs, twelve elected African members, and four nominated African members selected by the Department of Native Affairs. The NRC had limited powers, and was unable to make laws or veto decisions, but it was allowed to make recommendations to the government. The NRC had an important role in shaping government policy towards Africans, and held great significance among the African population.

Following World War II, frustration among councilors grew as they expected discriminatory restrictions against Africans to be eased, only for the government to increase them. In August 1946, the NRC unanimously passed a motion to adjourn, expressing their disapproval of the government's policy of segregation and demanded the abolition of all discriminatory legislation. The councilors believed that if the NRC was adjourned, Parliament would be unable to pass African-related legislation, as such bills required consultation with the NRC first. In May 1947, Prime Minister Jan Smuts proposed a policy of black self-government under a reformed NRC to end the adjournment. However, the councilors rejected the idea as Smuts refused to abolish discriminatory legislation. In the following year, D.F. Malan's National Party won the general election, defeating Smuts' United Party, and beginning their implementation of apartheid. The new government suggested that the councilors accept the apartheid legislation without voicing objections, but the NRC refused, leading to the eventual abolition of the Council in 1951.

During its existence, critics claimed the NRC was nothing more than a tool for the white government to control the black population by granting them representation without real political power. This was due to the Council's limited authority as it could only make recommendations to the government, which was under no obligation to implement them. The NRC's lack of autonomy also drew criticism, as it was established to represent Black South Africans, yet ultimately remained subject to the control of the government. Additionally, the NRC was criticised for failing to bring about any meaningful change.

== Background ==
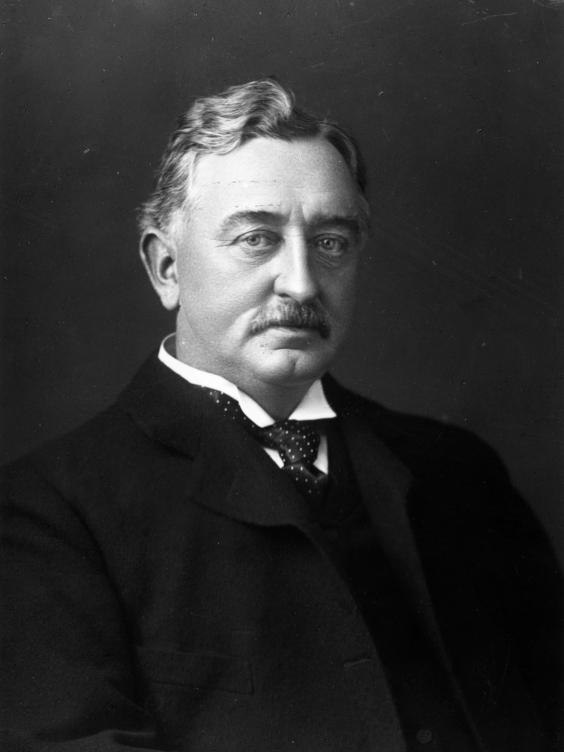
As prime minister, Cecil Rhodes supported a bill that disenfranchised many African voters.

The history of Black South African political representation dates back to the Cape Qualified Franchise, established in the 1853 Cape of Good Hope Constitution. The Cape Qualified Franchise granted male British subjects aged 21 or older living in the Cape Colony the right to vote, regardless of skin colour, so long as they met one of two qualifications. The occupancy qualification granted voting rights to men who occupied property valued at £25 or greater for at least 12 months. The salary qualification granted voting rights to men if they earned a salary of £50 or greater (or a salary of £25 if board and lodging is provided). As Africans (the general term "African" was commonly used to refer to Black South Africans during this period) became more active in politics and registered as voters, some Cape residents and organisations grew increasingly agitated. This led to parliamentary efforts to limit African participation in the Cape franchise, especially after the incorporation of the Transkei territory. The Parliamentary Voters' Registration Act of 1887 limited franchise for Africans in the Cape by excluding communal or tribal lands from the property qualification. Only private occupancy of a house or building qualified individuals to vote. In 1892, the qualifications for voting were made more stringent by Prime Minister Cecil Rhodes and his support of the Franchise and Ballot Act. The act raised the required property value from £50 to £75 and introduced a literacy test. Although these restrictions applied to all voters, they disproportionately affected Africans as they were poorer and mostly relied on the occupancy qualification to vote, resulting in only a small number of them being eligible to vote. Upon the establishment of the Union of South Africa in 1910, nationwide extension of the multi-racial franchise was not implemented, leaving most Africans, excluding the small number of eligible voters in the Cape Province, disenfranchised.

== Formation ==
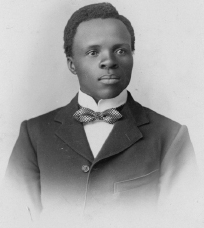
Sol Plaatje led a delegation to Europe in 1919 to protest discriminatory legislation.

Following the formation of the Union of South Africa, the government largely disregarded African political organisations and their calls for equality. An exception occurred in 1919 when an African National Congress (ANC) delegation traveled to Europe to present a memorandum to the British government and the Versailles Peace Conference. The delegation was protesting against the treatment of Africans by the government. One of the ANC leaders, Sol Plaatje, highlighted the discriminatory legislation passed by the Union government, which he attributed to the lack of African representation in the government. While the conference overlooked the delegation, the British Colonial Office sent a clear message to the South African government to address the inadequate African representation. This resulted in Prime Minister Jan Smuts passing the Native Affairs Act of 1920, which laid down provisions for establishing local councils in rural areas and a general council for large rural tribal units in the Transkei and Ciskei. Additionally, the act included provisions for organising conferences, where Africans from all regions of the country would voice their opinions on government proposals. Conferences were held regularly from 1924 to 1927, and many future NRC councilors were appointed by the government to attend and provide their opinions on legislation. By 1923, rural Africans were provided a means of expressing their opinions, but urban Africans still lacked any form of representation. The Natives Urban Areas Act was subsequently passed in 1923, which included provisions for the creation of advisory boards, consisting solely of African members, with the exception of the chairpersons, who were white officials. These boards served as advisory bodies for regulations passed by the corresponding urban local authority. Despite their lack of legislative or any other political power, the government was wary of these advisory boards and viewed them with caution.

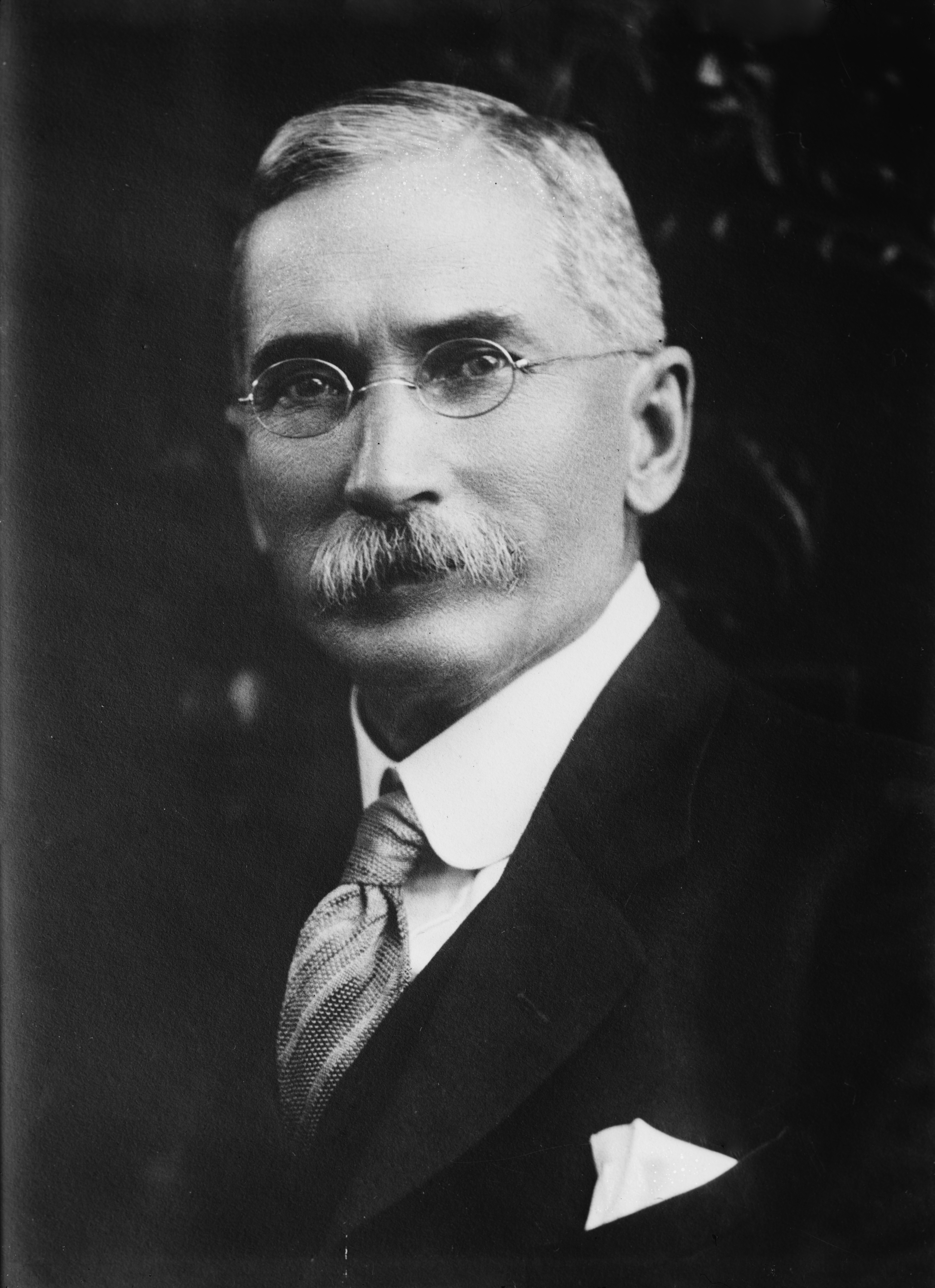
Prime Minister J.B.M. Hertzog.

J.B.M. Hertzog served as the Prime Minister of South Africa from 1924 to 1939 and was a firm believer in the policy of racial segregation. He felt that the Cape Franchise posed a threat to white domination and was determined to eliminate it. After reading some of the resolutions of the ANC, Hertzog stated in the House of Assembly in 1923 that Africans seemed to be satisfied with nothing less than direct representation in all legislative bodies, and that something more had to be done to prevent unrest. In 1926, Hertzog presented a group of bills that led to the establishment of the Natives Representative Council (NRC) and the abolition of the Cape Franchise ten years later. The formation of a nationwide African council was a controversial matter in the all-white Parliament, and much debate took place before the government agreed to it. By 1927, the influence of the Industrial and Commercial Workers' Union (ICU) was at its peak, and its popularity among Africans made both Hertzog and Smuts, the leader of the parliamentary opposition, uneasy. Between the years of 1927 and 1930, no conferences were held to gather the opinion of African citizens, a direct result of the rise of the ICU and the government's fear of militant opinions being displayed during these conferences, despite the fact that all participants were nominated by the government. The idea of an African council was now seen as premature, and was described as a gathering place for "Communist agitators". Smuts expressed concern that the proposed council could easily become a breeding ground for agitation and Bolshevism among the law-abiding natives. The proposal for a council bill was abandoned in 1930 due to concerns that it would disturb the existing white civilization. Despite attempts to come up with alternative plans, none of them adequately addressed the needs of the African intelligentsia, which was the primary goal of the original council bill.

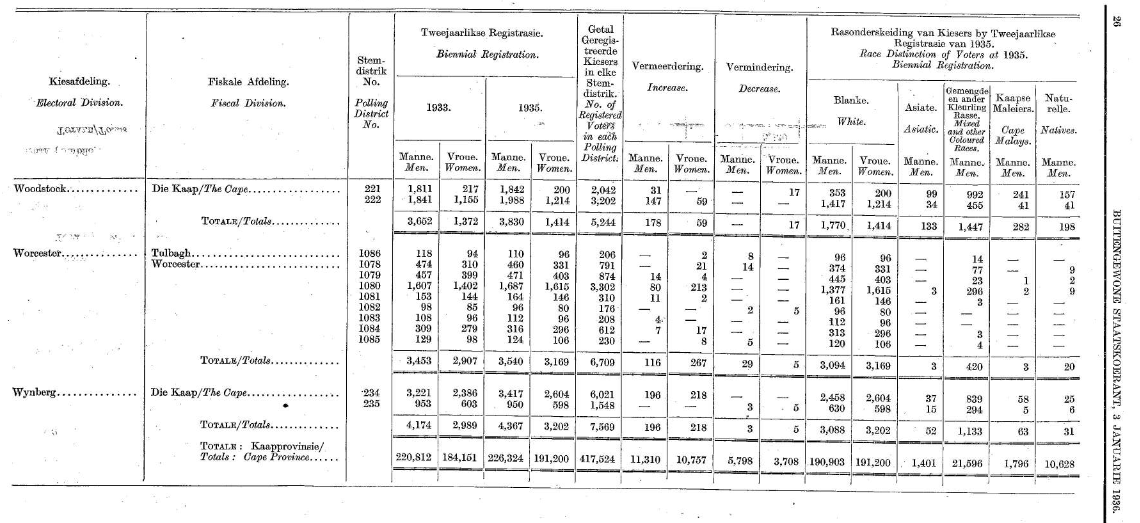
Registered voters in the Cape Province prior to the Representation of Natives Act.

By 1935, the threat posed by the ICU had diminished and the only other significant African organisation, the ANC, was in disarray. After a decade of discussions, the Representation of Natives Act was finally passed, abolishing the Cape Franchise and establishing the NRC with 22 members. Six of the 16 members of the NRC were from the Department of Native Affairs, including the five white Chief Native Commissioners and the Secretary of Native Affairs who acted as the Chair of the Council and had the power to cast a deciding vote. The African councilors consisted of 12 elected members and 4 nominated members selected by the Department of Native Affairs. The eligible electorate for the election consisted of African males over the age of 18 who had paid their poll tax and held a receipt for the payment. The African electorate also had the opportunity to vote for 4 white candidates who would serve in the Senate. The Cape Africans, who were recently removed from the common roll, were able to elect 3 white representatives to the House of Assembly.

== History ==
The government created the NRC as a platform for educated Africans to express their political desires, granting them official recognition as leaders of the black community in South Africa. According to Smuts, Hertzog intended for the Council to serve as an outlet for the expression of African views and to steer both public and parliamentary opinions in their desired direction. This was expected to distract them from what the government considered disruptive and hazardous pursuits. The government also viewed the NRC as a useful tool, using it to identify prominent African leaders through its electoral processes.

The NRC did not have a fixed venue for its biannual meetings and instead convened in various locations across Pretoria, the nation's administrative capital, including school halls and other less impressive venues. On some occasions, the meetings were held in Cape Town. The NRC was responsible for providing feedback on legislation affecting Africans and advising Parliament on matters of importance to the NRC's constituents. All proposed legislation concerning Africans had to be presented to the NRC for review, and the Council would subsequently submit its reports to Parliament through the Minister of Native Affairs. However, starting in 1941, the government began to consolidate and modify laws without presenting them to the NRC, claiming that they only had to bring bills and not amendments to existing legislation to the NRC. Some members of Parliament disputed this, arguing that the Minister of Native Affairs was legally required to present all proposed legislation, whether it was in the form of bills or amendments, to the NRC for review.

Following the 1942 elections, newly elected Councilors Z.K. Matthews and James Moroka formed a caucus within the NRC with Matthews as chair. Under his leadership, a recess committee proposed several changes to the NRC, which were supported by A.B. Xuma, President-General of the ANC. The proposals included increasing Council membership, separating public servants from the Council, making an African councilor the chair, moving the venue to Cape Town, extending council sessions, and granting the Council statutory powers. However, these changes were never implemented and all the government was willing to endorse was an increase in Council membership three years later.

=== 1946 adjournment ===
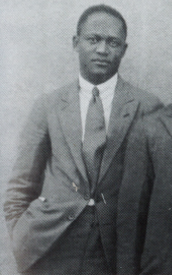
Z.K. Matthews was elected to the Natives Representative Council in 1942.

From 1942 to 1946, the legislation that the NRC was requested to pass and the government's failure to present amendments to legislation, led to growing frustration among the members. They had expected that the end of World War II would bring some relief to the restrictions placed on the African population, especially in light of the Atlantic Charter, which advocated for self-determination of all people. Instead, the opposite happened and restrictions increased. On August 15, 1946, Z.K. Matthews, as the Chairman of the Council, drafted a motion to adjourn the NRC, presented by Moroka and unanimously passed by both elected and nominated councilors. The adjournment statement expressed the Council's disapproval of the government's policy of segregation towards non-European citizens, which they saw as contrary to the values of the Atlantic Charter and the United Nations Charter, and demanded that all discriminatory legislation affecting non-Europeans be immediately abolished.

The NRC's decision to suspend its 1946 session did not arise spontaneously, nor was it solely caused by the brutal suppression of a mineworkers' strike 11 days earlier, as is popularly claimed. It was the result of a carefully arranged agreement between the NRC and A.B. Xuma, who was the President-General of the ANC. At the request of Xuma, the NRC agreed to terminate its session unilaterally unless the Smuts' government agreed to abolish all pass laws, recognise African trade unions, and repeal the Ministry of Native Affairs' authority to banish Africans without trial. When the NRC decided to adjourn, it sent a clear message to the government that they had reached their breaking point and could no longer tolerate discriminatory policies. The adjournment also underscored the prominent role of the ANC in shaping African politics.

The idea of whether the councilors should resign and not participate in the 1948 NRC elections generated a lot of debate. ANC leaders and councilors deemed it impossible to boycott the election, as they believed that the NRC was a tool that could be utilised in the struggle for freedom and the elections were too complicated to contemplate a successful boycott. Instead, the councilors aimed to use the adjournment as a tactic to disrupt Parliament. They believed that bills concerning Africans could not be presented before Parliament unless they had been previously presented before the NRC. Therefore, Parliament would find it difficult to pass certain legislation.

==== Aftermath ====
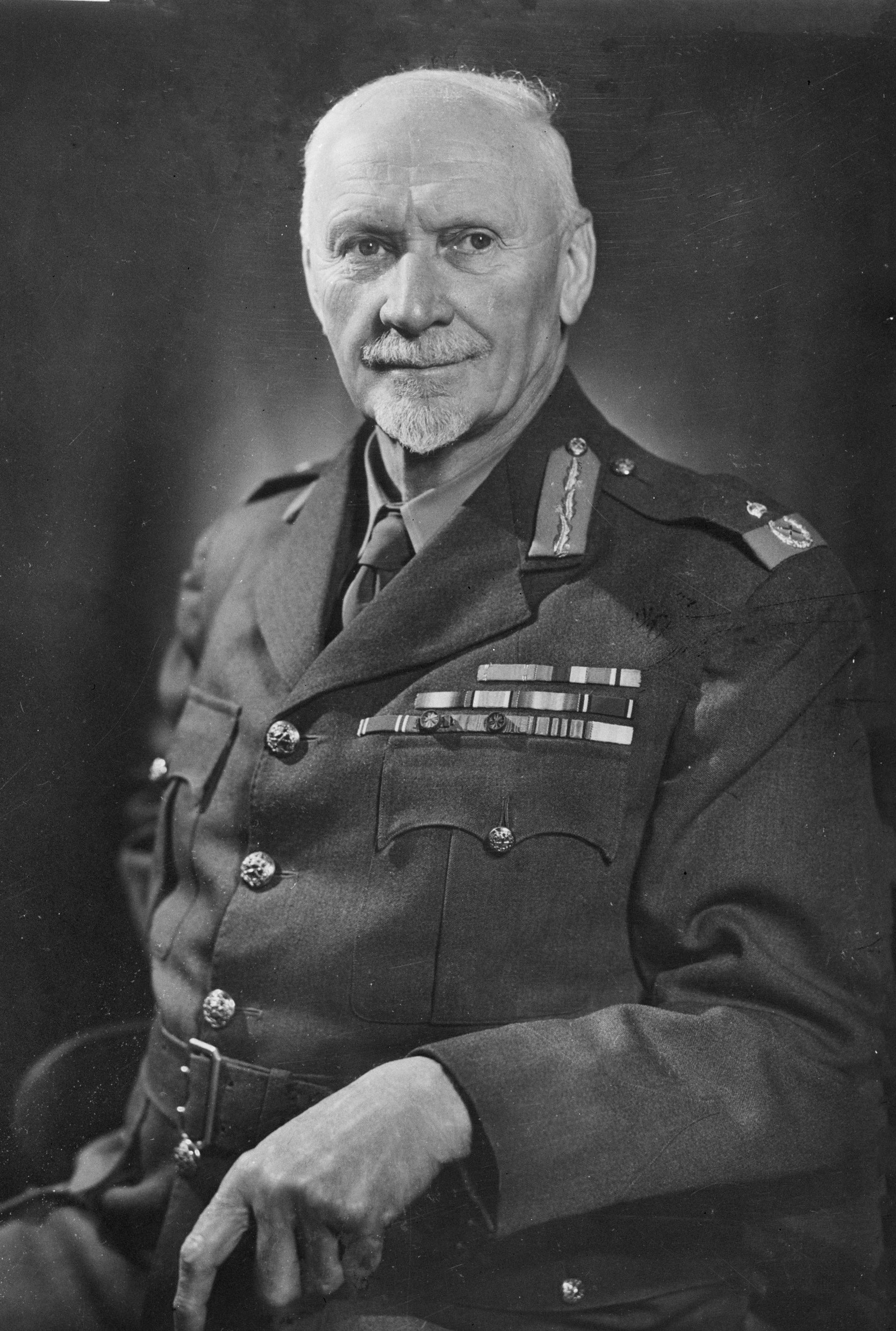
Prime Minister Smuts in 1947.

The NRC held their next session on November 20, 1946, as the councilors gathered in Pretoria to hear the government's response to their adjournment resolution. Prior to the session, the government compiled a list of reasons for the August adjournment, based on statements made by Z.K. Matthews to the Bantu World newspaper. The causes listed included a lack of respect for the NRC, failure to consult the Council, inaction on the Council's resolutions, and continued oppressive legislation. This included restrictions on rights such as the prohibition of all meetings in the northern Transvaal, the prohibition of meetings on mining ground, the extension of pass laws to the Cape, and restrictions on travel. From August to November, a strict control measure was imposed in the form of a proclamation that restricted the rights of Africans in urban areas under the control of certain local authorities. This proclamation demonstrated the government's intention to ignore the Council's decision to adjourn until discriminatory legislation was abolished.

During their meeting with the NRC, Jan Hofmeyr, the deputy prime minister, delivered a speech which outlined what the African people had received from the government, but it did not contain any political concessions or compromise. Hofmeyr was regarded as a leading liberal of his time, and the absence of Smuts—who was overseas at the time—led Africans to believe that Hofmeyr had written the speech himself, without any influence from Smuts. In reality, the government's response had been thoroughly discussed with Smuts, who even made an amendment to Hofmeyr's speech to make it less apologetic and stiffer in tone. Although the NRC soon realised that the speech did not truly reflect Hofmeyr's views, they became disillusioned with white liberals. They believed that if Hofmeyr could compromise his principles for political expediency, he would likely do so again if he became prime minister. The councilors stressed that, being the only representatives of the African people, they had no intention of resigning. Instead, they would wait for the government to fully meet their demands before taking any further action. Following the councilors' meeting with Hofmeyr, the NRC adjourned again.

In May 1947, Prime Minister Smuts requested a meeting with six members of the NRC, including Matthews, to discuss proposals. The Smuts proposals were for a policy of self-government in black areas under a reconstituted NRC, thereby giving Africans a greater share in their own administration. However, once these proposals were revealed, Smuts was accused by white politicians of wanting to form a black parliament that would unite the 8 million Africans under anti-white leadership. While the Council's adjournment succeeded in forcing the government to acknowledge the need for a new "native policy", its refusal to abolish discriminatory legislation made it impossible for Smuts' ideas to have any real impact on the NRC.

== Later years and abolition ==
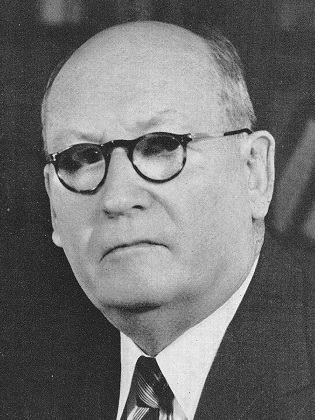
D.F. Malan led the National Party to victory in 1948.

In May 1948, the National Party led by D.F. Malan won the general election, defeating the United Party under Smuts. This marked the beginning of apartheid, a new policy that aimed to institutionalise racial segregation and discrimination against non-White South Africans. However, several months after the general election, the new National Party government had yet to meet with the Council or discuss its abolition, despite Malan's desire to do so. Although they had not held a formal session since 1946, the NRC held its third and final election in 1948. Although the councilors did not want to keep the existing system, they were hesitant to abolish the NRC, as it remained their only platform for advocating equality and amplifying African voices. In January 1949, the National Party government appointed W.J.G Mears as the new chair of the NRC and called for a meeting of the Council. Mears conveyed the government's message that it was not willing to accept the Council's demand for the abolition of discriminatory legislation, and that it intended to abolish the NRC since it served no useful purpose. Despite talks of abolition, a by-election was held in 1949 after the death of a former councilor. There was much debate in the press about whether NRC councilors should resign, but significant pressure came from the African National Congress Youth League. The councilors argued that they had a mandate from the people who elected them, and thus refused to resign from the Council. An informal meeting took place in August 1950 between the NRC and the government, with the new Secretary of Native Affairs W.W.M. Eiselen present. Eiselen contacted Matthews and proposed that the NRC caucus hold an informal meeting to discuss ways to resolve the impasse. Although the government had not formally indicated that they were considering using the NRC as a channel to implement apartheid, Eiselen's renewed attempts to heal the breach suggested that he wanted the NRC to be part of his apartheid policy.

The NRC's eleventh and final session took place on 5 December 1950. The Council was called together to hear an explanation of apartheid, which was the first time that Africans were formally addressed on the policy by the government. The outcome of the meeting was deemed important because the government had indicated that it would not abolish the Council if it cooperated with them, but that depended on whether the newly appointed Minister of Native Affairs, Hendrik Verwoerd, would make a statement on apartheid that would satisfy the councilors and convince them to cooperate. Verwoerd delivered his address and promptly left the meeting, having made a significant effort to resolve the deadlock. He made it clear that if the Council were to comply, no political discussions would be entertained and the topics of discussion were to be at Eiselen's discretion. In the past, the agenda was not strictly adhered to, and councilors were given the freedom to express their opinions at any time. Eiselen insisted that they pass the apartheid legislation first, and only then would they be allowed to comment on it. These new rules meant that the councilors were expected to approve apartheid legislation without giving their opinion or objections. The councilors refused to comply and eventually left the hall one by one. Eiselen continued as long as there was a quorum, but ultimately, everyone left the hall, and the last session of the NRC ended in defeat for Eiselen. The NRC was officially abolished the following year in 1951.

== Election system ==
During elections, 12 of the 16 councilors were elected, with nine being chosen through electoral colleges. The remaining three were selected by the black advisory boards in urban areas. At the time of the formation of the NRC, there were 5.5 million rural African voters and 1.1 million urban Africans. The government's main goal was to provide adequate representation to urban Africans, who were believed to be the source of potential future problems for the government. The belief was that any African revolt would originate from cities where most of the educated Africans lived. The electoral machinery for the NRC was already in place by 1936, with local and general Councils and advisory boards in urban areas established under the Native Affairs Act of 1920.

Once elected, African Council members served five-year terms. To be eligible to run for office, candidates needed to be taxpayers or qualify as registered voters in the Cape. This effectively allowed all African males who were over 18 years old, were South African by birth, and lived in the electoral area for two years prior to the election, to run for office. Place of birth could be disregarded in some cases, as demonstrated by Albert Luthuli, who was not born in South Africa but was still able to run for office. The government had significant control over NRC membership through sections 23 and 24 of the Native Affairs Act, including the power to exclude candidates subject to banning orders from running for office. However, these powers were never exercised. George Champion was banned and deported from Natal for three years under the Riotous Assemblies Act but was still able to run for office and was eventually elected in 1942.

=== Voting ===
Some leaders, such as Xuma and D.D.T. Jabavu, expressed skepticism about the use of a communal voting system, arguing that it made individuals vulnerable to bribery due to the high level of illiteracy among the population. However, no evidence of such cases was ever presented. On the contrary, there are reports suggesting that even in the most arbitrary electoral units, where voting was conducted through a local chief, the chief was required to take into account the views of their followers. A more significant critique of the voting system was made by Matthews, who argued that the show of hands method used in rural local Councils and electoral committees was inadequate. He believed that voting by a show of hands made the process less reliable. In reality, the show of hands method was secure, as the election results were placed in a sealed envelope and sent to the authorities. Given the high illiteracy rate of the population, however, it can be argued that there was no feasible alternative to the show of hands method. At the time, voting methods designed to assist illiterate individuals, such as the use of election symbols, had not been widely utilised.

The elections were conducted in two stages, which added complexity to the process. During the first stage, potential candidates were nominated by one or more electoral units. Some candidates self-nominated, while others were nominated against their will, as was the case for Xuma in 1942 and 1948. The reason for the nomination stage is unclear, but it may have been used by the government to gauge the level of support for African candidates, particularly those considered to be "agitators". On the other hand, for the candidates, the nomination stage allowed them to assess their level of support prior to the election day. Those who were only locally known were able to withdraw if it became clear that they did not have enough support from other electoral units.

== Elections ==
=== 1937 elections ===
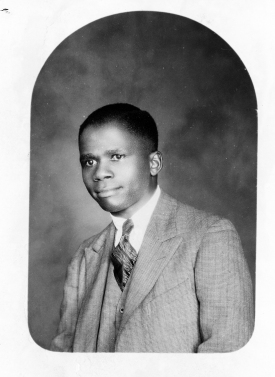
ANC President-General Xuma chose not to run as an NRC candidate, viewing the Council as ineffective.

In the 1937 elections, the All-African Convention (AAC), the ANC, and the Communist Party of South Africa all presented their own candidates. Despite internal conflicts within the ANC and AAC, all three parties made a concerted effort to secure their candidates' victories. Notable leaders, such as Moroka and George Champion, were put forward by the ANC and AAC, while the Communist Party nominated Edwin Mofutsanyana, who was the Secretary-General of the Communist Party but not yet a well-known figure on a national level. The councilors who emerged victorious from the election were experienced and established African leaders from urban areas. Many of them had participated in protests against the abolishment of the Cape Franchise in 1936, but there was no talk of boycotting the NRC elections. The presence of four newspaper editors among the twelve elected councilors demonstrates their significant influence over political opinions. The majority of political power available to African intellectuals during this time was largely controlled by the newly elected members of the Natives Representatives Council.

=== 1942 elections ===
Following the 1937 election, it became evident that the ANC was the most popular political party. By 1942, the ANC and the NRC had a close relationship. Xuma, the national leader of the ANC, wrote to Smit, the secretary of Native Affairs, saying that they were united and their cause was one. Xuma did not run as a candidate for the NRC elections set for November 4, 1942, because he felt the Council was limited by the act that established it, making the ANC a more effective body.

=== 1948 elections ===
In August 1946, Xuma suggested that Council members adjourn their next session as a form of protest against discriminatory legislation. The upcoming 1948 election posed the question of what the Council members should do. The ANC, after much discussion, decided that all councilors should run for re-election unopposed, but this was not feasible due to a lack of support. Only three councilors would be re-elected unopposed. The high number of nominations, particularly for Xuma, highlights that although voters supported the ANC, they were willing to disregard its stance on the NRC.

The All-African Convention did not nominate any candidates for the 1948 election. The Communist Party nominated three candidates, including Govan Mbeki, who was running for the first time as an NRC candidate for the Transkei region. However, similar to previous elections, none of the Communist Party candidates were successful in getting elected. Matthews stated that the outcome of the election, which saw that the councilors remained unchanged, indicated that the aspirations of the African community had not altered. They would present their demands for the elimination of racial discrimination to the newly elected National Party government.

== Issues ==
=== Education ===
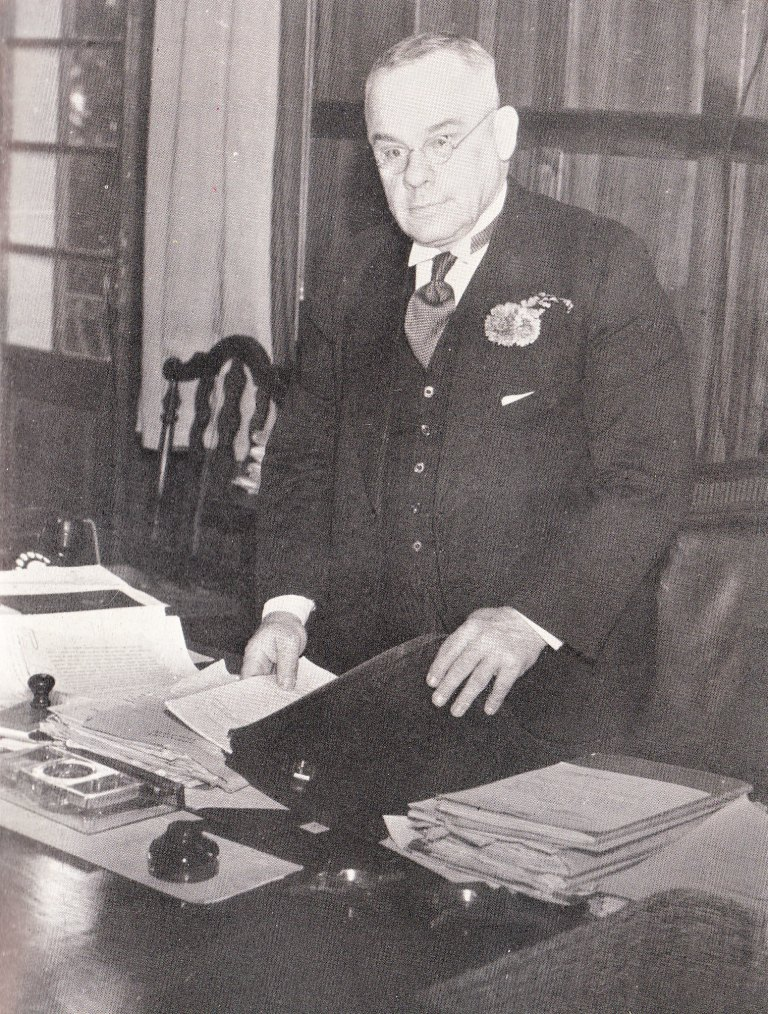
A bill introduced by Deputy Prime Minister Hofmeyr provided free education for black children.

The NRC saw education as the key to freedom and equality for the African community. Matthews claimed that the only career options for an educated African were to teach, preach, or agitate. The NRC aimed to expand these limited career options and believed that Africa's future was intertwined with its educational system. In 1941, it was announced that the Council's resolutions had been approved, and primary education in government schools would be provided for free. In 1945, Jan Hofmeyr, then the deputy prime minister, introduced a bill to Parliament which transferred responsibility for financing black education from African people to the Department of Education. This change meant that Africans would no longer have to bear the financial burden of their schooling through the poll tax. As a result, by 1947, Africans were receiving free primary education, books, and meals. The number of high school students had also increased three-fold from 1936, a clear indication of the government's recognition of the NRC's resolutions. The NRC appreciated the improvements made in education, but opposed the segregationist policies that were being implemented and were unhappy with the level of segregation present in the education system.

=== Rural issues ===
The issue of land ownership was a major source of conflict within the NRC. The Council members were opposed to both the 1913 Land Act and the 1936 Trust and Land Act. The Council believed that Africans were doing well before the 1913 Land Act was passed, which they saw as enacted to provide labor for the mines, and felt there was no security under the new Trust Land system. The NRC rejected the government's explanation for the 1936 Trust and Land Act, which claimed to protect African land from white acquisition, and instead believed it was enacted to safeguard white land ownership. The Council's main focus was to help individual black farmers. At the time, about one-seventh of South Africa's land was still in African hands, with black land companies using collective financing to purchase and lease large farms. The government was supposed to provide loans for black farmers to buy land, but only loans in white areas were given, making black farmers indebted to the government. In 1938, an amendment to the 1936 Land and Trust Act was passed, making it mandatory for the government to buy out black farmers on white land. Africans who wanted to farm were frustrated by the lack of support and restrictions on expanding their holdings. The government's priority was to provide plots for homeless people rather than promoting independent black farming, leading to low productivity on Trust Lands. Farmers couldn't succeed and most people who lived there did not want to become farmers, resulting in a wasteful use of manpower and damaging the land. The Department of Native Affairs was aware of the problem but was unable to resolve it.

=== Urban areas ===
The legislation of the time made it difficult for Africans to gain permanent residency in cities, with urban areas considered as "white" and only open to black people as servants. Those who couldn't prove employment were deemed "surplus" and pushed out. The NRC believed the government's efforts to discourage African migration from rural areas to cities was due to a need for cheap labor for mines. However, the government also feared allowing free African entry to urban areas would upset white farmers, as well as the decline of rural labor for mines. In 1947, a regulation was put in place allowing the railways to refuse tickets to Africans without secure employment. Those caught by authorities without employment would be jailed, fined, and expelled from urban areas. At the time, Prime Minister Smuts believed the territorial separation of black and white wouldn't require force, as it would happen naturally through the Slums Act and government-approved housing. A 1937 census showed the number of "surplus" Africans living in cities, leading to many expulsions and efforts by some municipalities to reduce the African population. The NRC tried to raise awareness of the impact of these laws on African urban dwellers to the government and municipalities.

=== Taxation ===
During the time the NRC was in operation from 1937 to 1950, two types of taxes were imposed on Africans. The first and more significant one was the poll tax, which required all African men aged 18 to 65 years to pay a fixed rate of one pound per year. The second type was a collection of various local taxes, primarily paid in rural areas and consisting of taxes like a dog tax and a hut tax, the latter of which was only implemented in Natal to discourage Zulus from having multiple wives. Only 20% of the poll tax was used for the direct benefit of Africans, despite being the only source of funding for African facilities of all kinds, including health care and education. The NRC repeatedly called for the abolition of the poll tax and its replacement by an income tax, as they felt it was unjust for only Africans to be required to pay a tax that was not imposed on other parts of the population. Efforts to abolish the tax were defeated in 1939 by the Department of Native Affairs. To enforce payment of the poll tax, the Native Taxation Act allowed for police raids to check for tax receipts, and Africans had to produce their receipts to get employment in the mines and vote for the NRC. Tax evasion was widespread, including among NRC councilors, and measures were taken to address this, such as detention camps for defaulters and paying bonuses to chiefs and headmen. The threat of prosecution for tax evasion compelled African men to seek employment with cash wages, which the NRC saw as forced labor.

=== Pass laws ===
In 1937, the pass laws, which required Africans to carry documentation that proved their eligibility to be in a specific area, was not yet universally implemented in all four provinces. In the Transvaal and Orange Free State provinces, Africans could carry a maximum of nine passes, while the requirement was absent in the Cape and Natal. The NRC consistently and unanimously condemned the practice. The Council members viewed freedom of movement as a fundamental aspect of a free and democratic society and saw the pass system as a form of enslavement. The councilors made arguments that they believed would appeal to the Department of Native Affairs, which frequently used native custom to justify its actions. Therefore, the councilors argued that the pass laws were inconsistent with native customs and should be abolished for that reason. The NRC initially held hope that changes could be made to the pass system, but despite protests towards the Department of Native Affairs and the Native Affairs Commission, nothing came of their efforts. The pass laws were instead more strictly enforced than ever before.

== Effectiveness ==
The NRC had great significance for the African community. Its establishment enabled the formation of a racial consciousness and helped them to understand their political standing more clearly. It was the first time since the creation of the Union of South Africa that black individuals had an official platform to express their opinions. For the black leaders, the Council served as a means to present their views to the government and elevated their status among their constituents. Perhaps most importantly, it allowed them to address their constituents at political gatherings in their districts. Africans viewed the NRC as a stepping stone towards securing a place in the parliamentary system. They aimed to either strengthen the NRC's power to the point where it could challenge the dominance of the white Parliament or to replace it and become a part of the Parliament themselves. Despite the NRC's significance for the African community, it did not bring about equality for Africans. When Africans demanded equality and refused to cooperate with the government, the government ultimately dissolved the Council in 1951, forcing Africans to resort to alternative methods to achieve their goals.

=== Criticisms ===
During its years of operation, the NRC was deemed a dead-end by some critics who believed that it could not lead to meaningful change. Due to its format, nobody was under any obligation to take the Council's decisions and recommendations seriously, while many could defy and ignore their advice. American writer Carter G. Woodson claimed that the NRC achieved Hertzog's goals of keeping the African population quiet and preventing them from using their numerical superiority to gain political power. In his autobiography, Luthuli expressed frustration with the lack of progress made through the Council, noting that their efforts to raise awareness have fallen on deaf ears. He would later describe the NRC as little more than a hollow show. Luthuli felt that white South Africa was unresponsive to the plight of non-White South Africans and that the media was complicit in perpetuating this indifference. Despite this, Luthuli maintained a belief that the NRC should stay and that their advocacy efforts should increase because there were people beyond South Africa who could hear their message.

== Sources ==
- Couper, Scott (11 October 2010). Albert Luthuli: Bound by Faith. University of KwaZulu-Natal Press. ISBN 9781869141929.
- Crozier, William Percival, ed. (July 5, 1935). "Native Policy in South Africa". The Guardian. London, England. p. 08 – via Newspapers.com.
- Crozier, William Percival, ed. (January 24, 1938). "The Natives' Representative Council". The Guardian. London, England. p. 10 – via Newspapers.com.
- Evans, Ivan (1997). Bureaucracy and Race. University of California Press. ISBN 9780520206519.
- Hepple, Alex (1967). Verwoerd. Penguin Books. ISBN 9780140209136.
- Luthuli, Albert (1962). Let My People Go. McGraw-Hill. ISBN 978-0070391208.
- Matthews, Z.K. (1981). Wilson, Monica (ed.). Freedom for My People. Rowman & Littlefield Publishers, Incorporated. ISBN 9780908396849.
- Ngubane, Jordan (1946). Should the natives representative council be abolished? (PDF). African Bookman.
- Nyika, Farai; Fourie, Johan (2020). "Black Disenfranchisement in the Cape Colony, c.1887–1909: Challenging the Numbers". Journal of Southern African Studies. 46 (3): 455–469. Bibcode:2020JSAfS..46..455N. doi:10.1080/03057070.2020.1741177.
- Rich, Paul (1996). State Power and Black Politics in South Africa, 1912–51. Macmillan Press. ISBN 9780312127565.
- Roth, Mia (2016). The Rhetorical Origins of Apartheid. McFarland & Company, Inc. ISBN 978-0-7864-9982-3.
- Simons, Harold; Simons, Ray (1969). Class and Colour in South Africa, 1850-1950. Penguin. ISBN 9780904759525.
- Trapido, Stanley (1964). "The Origins of the Cape Franchise Qualifications of 1853". The Journal of African History. 5: 37–54. doi:10.1017/S0021853700004497.
- Visser, Beaurel (2022). "African Resistance to the 1887 Parliamentary Voters' Registration Act". Journal of Southern African Studies. 48 (6): 975–991. doi:10.1080/03057070.2023.2167392.
- Watson, Arthur, ed. (February 14, 1936). "Native Vote in South Africa". The Daily Telegraph. London, England. p. 13 – via Newspapers.com.
- Wehner, Joachim; de Kadt, Daniel (2024). "The Tools of Racial Disenfranchisement: Lessons from 135,457 Individual Voter Records". SocArXiv Papers: 1–57. doi:10.31235/osf.io/by82s.
- Woodson, Carter (1943). "Review of Political Representation of Africans". The Journal of Negro History. 28: 98–100. doi:10.2307/2714791. JSTOR 2714791.
