= Aldin Grout =

American missionary (1803–1894)

Aldin Grout (September 2, 1803 - February 12, 1894) was an American missionary known for his missionary activities in Zululand. He married Hannah Davis in November 1834 and traveled to the Cape Colony of the American Board of Commissioners for Foreign Missions a month later. He built his first mission in Zululand, called Ginani, in 1836. This station was destroyed in the battle between the Zulus and the Boers, and he built a new station called Inkanyezi in 1841.

He was born in Pelham, Massachusetts. He died in Springfield, Massachusetts. The town of Groutville in South Africa was named after him.
