= Groutville =

Town in KwaZulu-Natal, South Africa

- Location within KwaZulu-Natal Location within South Africa
- Coordinates: 29.388°S 31.245°E
- Country: South Africa
- Province: KwaZulu-Natal
- District: iLembe
- Municipality: KwaDukuza

Area
  - Total: 7.89 km^{2} (3.05 sq mi)

Population (2011)
  - Total: 12,638
  - Density: 1,600/km^{2} (4,150/sq mi)

Racial makeup (2011)
  - Black African: 99.6%
  - Coloured: 0.2%
  - Indian/Asian: 0.1%
  - White: 0.1%

First languages (2011)
  - Zulu: 93.1%
  - S. Ndebele: 1.4%
  - English: 1.3%
  - Tsonga: 1.2%
  - Other: 3.0%
- Time zone: UTC+2 (SAST)
- Postal code (street): 4449
- PO box: 4450
- Area code: 032

Groutville is a town in Ilembe District Municipality in the KwaZulu-Natal province of South Africa. Home of the late ANC leader, Chief Albert Luthuli and his wife Nokukhanya Bhengu, Home to RT Rev H. Mdelwa Hlongwane founder to The Bantu Methodist Church.

Mission station several km south-west of Stanger. Established in 1844 by the Reverend Aldin Grout (1803–1894) of the American Missionary Society and named after him. Formerly it was known as Umvoti.
