= James Moroka =

South African activist (1891–1985)

8th President-General of the African National Congress
- In office 1949–1952
- Preceded by: Alfred Bitini Xuma
- Succeeded by: Albert Luthuli

Personal details
- Born: James Sebe Moroka; 16 March 1891 Blesberg, Orange Free State
- Died: 10 November 1985 (aged 94)
- Political party: African National Congress
- Occupation: Politician; physician; activist

James Sebe Moroka, OLG (16 March 1891 – 10 November 1985) was a medical doctor and a politician, who was the president of the African National Congress (ANC) from 1949 to 1952.

Moroka was elected as the president of the ANC by the support of the African National Congress Youth League and its leaders Walter Sisulu and Nelson Mandela in December 1949. During Moroka's presidency, the ANC started to implement more militant tactics in fighting the country's apartheid regime.

In 1952, Moroka was convicted of "statutory communism" according to the Suppression of Communism Act with 20 other defendants. During the trial, Moroka realised the limitations he would have during apartheid while acting as president. He decided he could do more for his community practising medicine; he pleaded for mitigation and rejected the ANC's principles of racial equality and was soon expelled from the party.

The district hospital in Thaba Nchu is named in his memory where he continued to practice medicine. He was a family-oriented Christian.
