= K.E Masinga =

South African radio presenter

K.E. Masinga
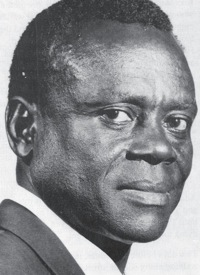
- K.E Masinga is the first Zulu radio presenter.
- Born: King Edward Masinga; 1904; Mzumbe, Natal Province, South Africa
- Died: 1990 (aged 85–86); Lamontville, KwaZulu-Natal, South Africa
- Occupations: Broadcaster, Composer, Teacher
- Employer: South African Broadcasting Corporation (SABC)

King Edward Masinga (1904-1990) also known as Shobane ka Mangethe and also known as Umfana weKheshi was a teacher who became the first African to present radio programmes in the history of South Africa. Masinga was one of the first broadcasters to broadcast on the Zulu station, which later became known as Radio Zulu. Apart from broadcasting, he was also a composer of songs which he wrote in the Zulu language. He was also the conductor of a musical group (choir) which he founded to sing songs which he composed.

== History ==
Masinga was born in the Mzumbe area in 1904. He was born to Christian parents. Due to the conflict between Zulu culture and Christianity, his father, who was a bricklayer, forced him to flee his home to become a missionary. He settled in Mzumbe where he preached and taught about Christianity.

His family moved to the Inanda, and Masinga began attending a school founded by Rev. John Dube and his wife Nokutela Dube called Ohlange Institute. His mother worked part-time to pay for his education. Masinga completed Ohlange Institute and then proceeded to Adams College where he matriculated and obtained a teaching qualification.

== Broadcasting ==
After obtaining his teaching certificate, he began working as a teacher and eventually became a head teacher. In 1941, at the age of 37, he decided to leave the teaching profession to pursue something different. He was discovered by chance by Hugh Tracy and given an opportunity to broadcast at African Broadcasting Studios.

== Recognition ==
A road in the city of Durban, which was previously called Old Fort Road, was renamed K.E Masinga Road, in honour of the radio hero Ukhozi FM has awards called the Amaqhawe Okhozi Achiever Awards, the highest of which is named after the hero.
