= All-African Convention =

1935 conference

All African Convention
- Type: Recognition of self development of the Native
- Signed: December 1935
- Location: Bloemfontein, Orange Free State

The All-African Convention conference took place from 15–18 December 1935. Notable figures who attended the delegation included Davidson Don Tengo Jabavu, Pixley ka Isaka Seme, JL Dube, Zacharias Richard Mahabane, Alfred Bitini Xuma, James Moroka and Thabo Edwin Mofutsanyana. The Convention consisted of representatives from across a broad political spectrum, including the African National Congress, the South African Communist Party, and the Industrial and Commercial Workers' Union. They convened at a community hall in Bloemfontein in response to three proposed bills by President J.B.M. Hertzog.

== Reasons for the AAC formation ==
The Convention was arranged in response to three proposed bills affecting the rights of natives known as the Hertzog Bills. These bills were:

=== Native Representation Bill ===
This bill proposed to abolish the Cape Qualified Franchise which had been in existence for Cape Coloureds since 1854. The bill proposed to set up a Native Representative Council with 21 members. Of the 21, five would be white officials of the Native Affairs Department; four of the remaining 16 members were to be appointed by electoral colleges composed of chiefs and headsmen. The other 12 members would be assigned by the government without an election process. In the end, only four white officials became part of the Native Representative Council.

=== Native Trust and Land Bill ===
The bill introduced black-only reserves for Africans on land that was identified by the Natives Land Act, 1913. This bill would therefore formalise the separation of white and black rural areas. A South African Native Trust was to be established to purchase all reserve land not yet owned by the state. This bill was enacted into law in 1936 as the Native Trust and Land Act.

=== Native Urban Areas Amendment Bill ===
The bill proposed that blacks could not acquire land in urban areas from non-blacks, except with the consent of the Governor-General. The Act was passed in 1937 (Act Number 46).

== Conference ==
A few leaders called on different organisations such as trade unions, civic, political, professional and religious groupings to send delegates to a convention to be held in Bloemfontein in December 1935. The conference was attended by about 400 delegates with representatives from both towns and rural areas. There were 30 delegates from Natal, 70 from the Orange Free State, 100 from the Transvaal, 200 from the Cape, 10 from Basutoland and one from Swaziland (since 2018 renamed to Eswatini). Comprehensive resolutions to address African grievances were drafted during the conference, including the constitution of the All-African Convention – which was an umbrella organisation aimed at promoting African rights through boycotts. Bloemfontein had also been chosen as the founding venue of the African National Congress on 8 January 1912. The conference took place from 15 to 18 December 1935. The following members made up the executive committee:

- DDT Jabavu – Chairman of preliminary meetings and later president of the convention
- AB Xuma – Vice President
- H Selby Msimang – General Secretary
- James Moroka – Treasurer
- RH Godlo – Record Secretary
- ZK Matthews - Clerks Draughtsmen
- Other committee members included John Langalibalele Dube, Reverend AS Mtimkhulu, WW Ndlovu, AWG Champion, and J Khambule from Natal; CR Moikangoa, Keable Mote, RA Sello, R Cingo and Thomas Mtobi Mapikela from the Orange Free State; RV Selepe, LT Mvabaza PAM Bell, TD Mweli Skota and ET Mofutsanyana from the Transvaal; and Zacharias Richard Mahabane, CK Sakwe, Alex M Jabavu, JM Dippa and P Mama from the Cape.

The following resolutions were made regarding the three proposed bills:

- Native Representative Bill

"This convention is strongly opposed to the creation of another colour bar in the Provincial Councils under the guise of the Provincial Council representation of Natives, as contemplated under the proposed Representation of Natives in Parliament Bill. The system of representation in vogue in the Cape Provincial Council, where there are no restrictions on the participation of non-Europeans in Provincial Council matters is, in the opinion of this convention, a model which might well be adopted in the provincial systems of other provinces, as well as by the Union Parliament itself". The convention proposed the adoption of a policy of political identity which would safeguard the interests of all races in South Africa. It acknowledged the different racial groupings and the development of their own lines socially and culturally; it also stressed that they would be bound together by the pursuit of common political objectives. The convention requested the extension of rights of citizenship to all groups in South Africa."

- Native Land and Trust Bill

The convention requested the proper adjustment of the land problems and therefore welcomed the attempt by the government to deal with this matter. However, according to the Convention, there was a gross inadequacy in the maximum amount of land to be acquired by the Natives' land trust. Of the total 143 million morgen, the Natives were only afforded 17 million which the convention perceived as unacceptable, as this did not take into account the future needs of an increasing Native population.

"The convention resolved that:—

(1) The resolutions on the three bills - the Representation of Natives, the Native Land and the Trust Bill - be submitted to Parliament by a deputation of Africans during the next session of Parliament. (2) The deputation presents the viewpoint of the African National Convention held at Bloemfontein on December 16 at the bar of the House of Assembly.

(3) The deputation submits to Parliament the contention that no permanent or peaceful solution of the franchise or land question is possible unless it be the result of mutual agreement between representatives of White and Black races, which is only possible by means of a round-table or similar conference."

- Urban Areas Amendment Bill

The following resolution was taken regarding the Urban Areas Amendment Bill:

"The projected amendment of the Natives (Urban Areas) Act threatens to disorganise everything already initiated by urban Africans in the way of self-development. This is occurring at a time when no real efforts are being made to remove the causes of the drift to the towns of the rural African families. Therefore this convention respectfully and yet strongly urges the Government to desist from introducing further legislation that disturbs the progress already initiated by Africans in the urban areas”.

Despite the proposals tabled to parliament, the Government proceeded to pass the proposed bills.
