= Cecilia Tshabalala =

South African women's rights activist and clubwoman

- Born: Ladysmith, Natal, South Africa
- Died: Alexandra, Transvaal, South Africa
- Education: Hampton Institute; New Britain State Normal School; Moody Bible Institute
- Occupations: Educator, women's rights activist, clubwoman and writer
- Employer: Young Women’s Christian Association (YWCA)
- Known for: founding the Daughters of Africa (DOA) women's club in 1932

Cecilia Lillian Tshabalala (fl. 1912 – 1960s) was a South African educator, women's rights activist, clubwoman and writer. She founded the women's club Daughters of Africa (DOA) in 1932 and was an early African nationalist.

== Biography ==
Tshabalala was born near Ladysmith in Natal, South Africa, and was educated at the Ohlange Institute, Durban and the American Zulu Mission School at Umzumbe in Natal.

Tshabalala emigrated to the United States in 1912, where she studied at the Hampton Institute in Hampton, Virginia, the New Britain State Normal School in New Britain, Connecticut, and the Moody Bible Institute (MBI) in Chicago, Illinois. After leaving education, she worked as a schoolteacher, for the Young Women’s Christian Association (YWCA), and as director of religious education at the Greater Nazarene Congregational Church in Brooklyn, New York City, New York. While living in the US, Tshabalala experienced American race relations and racial segregation of the Jim Crow laws, and was exposed to African-American women’s clubs.

Tshabalala lived in the United States for 18 years and returned to South Africa in 1930. She was offered a teaching position at Adams College, but chose instead to work as the administrator of eight schools in Kleinfontein and focus on activism for African women.

Tshabalala founded the Daughters of Africa (DOA) women's club in 1932, which drew upon African-American models of public engagement, organised educational initiatives, agricultural projects and small-scale enterprises and aimed to "promote sisterhood, to develop a community of mutual service, and to better society" as well as to "uplift the African race." Tshabalala wrote about club activities in the Johannesburg-based newspaper Bantu World and in the isiZulu-English newspaper Ilanga Lase Natal.

In 1939, Tshabalala moved to the Alexandra township in Transvaal to establish a branch of the DOA there. By the 1940s, the DOA had established branches across the province of Natal and in the mining communities at Witwatersrand. Members included activists Nokukhanya Bhengu, Bertha Mkhize, Joyce Mpama and Madie Hall Xuma. The group began to issue political demands, such as a rise in teachers salaries, and organised the 1943 Alexandra Bus Boycotts after an increase to fares that were prohibitive to black workers.

Tshabalala died in Alexandra in the 1960s. She featured in South African politician Hymen Meir Basner's memoir Am I African? (1993)
