= Nokutela Dube =

South African school founder (1873–1917)

Nokutela Dube SCOB
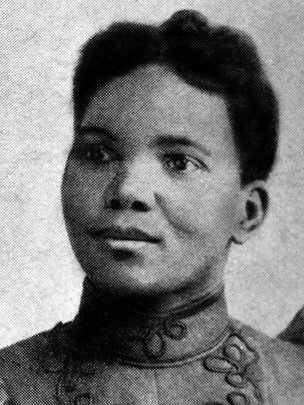
- Born: Nokutela Mdima; 1873; Inanda, Natal, South Africa
- Died: 25 January 1917 (aged 43–44); Johannesburg, South Africa
- Education: Inanda Seminary School
- Occupations: Teacher, preacher
- Known for: First South African woman to found a school
- Spouse(s): John Dube, m. 1894

Nokutela Dube (1873 – 25 January 1917) was the first South African woman to found a school. She cofounded the Ilanga lase Natal newspaper, Ohlange Institute and Natal Native Congress (the precursor to the South African Native National Congress) while she was married to John Langalibalele Dube. They both travelled to the United States, where Nokutela was described as a "woman of note". She died while estranged from her husband, who was then president of what would become the African National Congress. The school she co-founded was the place that Nelson Mandela chose as the location for his first ever vote in an election.

In 2017, Nokutela Dube was posthumously awarded South Africa's highest honour — the Order of the Golden Baobab — 100 years after her death.

== Life ==
Nokutela Mdima was born in 1873 to Christian converts at a missionary station at Inanda, near Durban, South Africa. Her father was called Simeon Mdima. From 1881, she was taught by Ida Wilcox, who was part of a husband-and-wife team running the mission. Nokutela was a star pupil and an essay she wrote was published in Ida's home town in Minnesota as part of a regular report she made to the press. Nokutela's essay was used to show how the mission was inspiring children to learn English.

After leaving Inanda Seminary School, Mdima worked as a teacher, and married John Dube in 1894 in Inanda. John was the son of James Dube who was a minister at Inanda. The couple left South Africa in April 1896 and travelled to Britain, sailing for New York from Southampton in May 1896. By November their story was being reported by the New York Tribune. Her husband was not the only black South African to visit New York, but Nokutela was unusual because she was female. The Los Angeles Times included Nokutela in their feature series "Women of note" on 13 February 1898. The newspapers introduced them as Mr and Mrs John Lindley Dube, and described their pleasing appearance, her ankle-length dress and her husband's double-breasted suit. (This adopted name was the same as that of the missionaries, Daniel and Lucy Lindley, who had established the Inanda mission.) The change in presentation was presumably made to assist American readers who might find John's middle name difficult to pronounce. The papers reported that Nokutela would take a home-making course, while her husband would train to join the clergy. Their stated objective was to be more "effective missionaries to the heathen".

While the Dubes were in the US, they were inspired by the educator Booker T. Washington, but their main training came from the Union Missionary Training Institute, where 30 to 45 Christian missionaries from Europe, Asia, Australia, Arabia, and in this case, Africa studied. This Brooklyn establishment was able to exist because pastors and professors would volunteer their time. While she was in America, the Woman's Board of Missions published her essay "Africa – The Story of My Life", in 1898.

== Ohlange ==
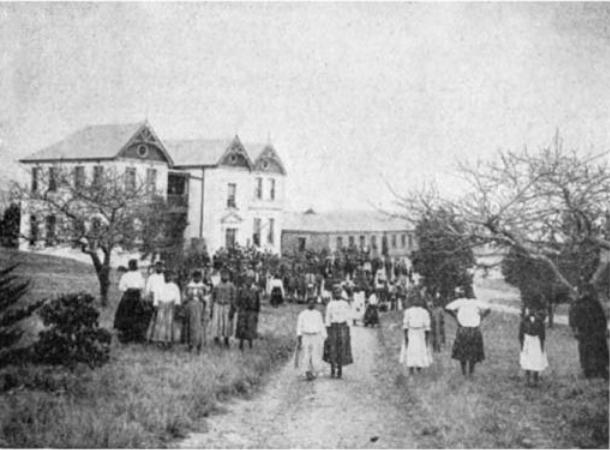
Ohlange High School in 1907

After returning to South Africa and teaching at Dube's old school at Inanda, they set up Ohlange High School. This was the first in the country to be established by black teachers. It was her husband who was offered the opportunity to use a farm that his cousin had bought, but it was Nokutela's links back to Mary Edwards, who led her old school, that helped the couple establish the farm that became the seminary.

Nokutela Dube taught music, cooking, housekeeping and tailoring, and also sang and played traditional instruments on fundraising tours. With her husband, she co-wrote Amagama Abantu (A Zulu Song Book), published in 1911. This book is regarded as a milestone in the creation of a new type of Zulu choral music. The Dubes described these secular songs as the first to combine Zulu and European traditions for the "Black Community". The first printing of this book records both John and Nokutela as joint authors in a plural form of isiZulu. John only once steps out of this form of address in the introduction to point out that the music is Nokutela's responsibility. Nokutela had musical abilities but she had also taken singing lessons from two teachers while in America. Nokutela described this as "better singing".

In addition to his literary works, the Dubes founded the first Zulu/English newspaper Ilanga laseNatali (The Sun of Natal) in 1903. The Dubes are credited with making the song "Nkosi Sikelel' iAfrika" popular. It became part of the South African national anthem after Ohlange Institute's choir used it. The choir played it at the South African Native National Congress meeting in 1912. It was sung after the closing prayer, and in 1925 would be adopted as the official closing anthem of the African National Congress.

Nokutela and John Dube's failure to have children was seen to reflect badly on Nokutela and John fathered a child with one of their pupils. Nokutela in her own childhood had written of the importance and expectation that her people put on having children. A committee was set up to investigate her husband, but they took no action and Nokutela felt humiliated. The couple separated in about 1914, and Nokutela moved to the Transvaal, where she preached in rural communities before becoming ill with kidney disease. She returned to live with her husband in Johannesburg, and died in 1917 at the age of 44. Her funeral was attended by Pixley ka Isaka Seme and other prominent members of what was to become the African National Congress (ANC). She was buried in an unmarked grave with a reference number starting "CK", which stood for "Christian Kaffir".

== Legacy ==
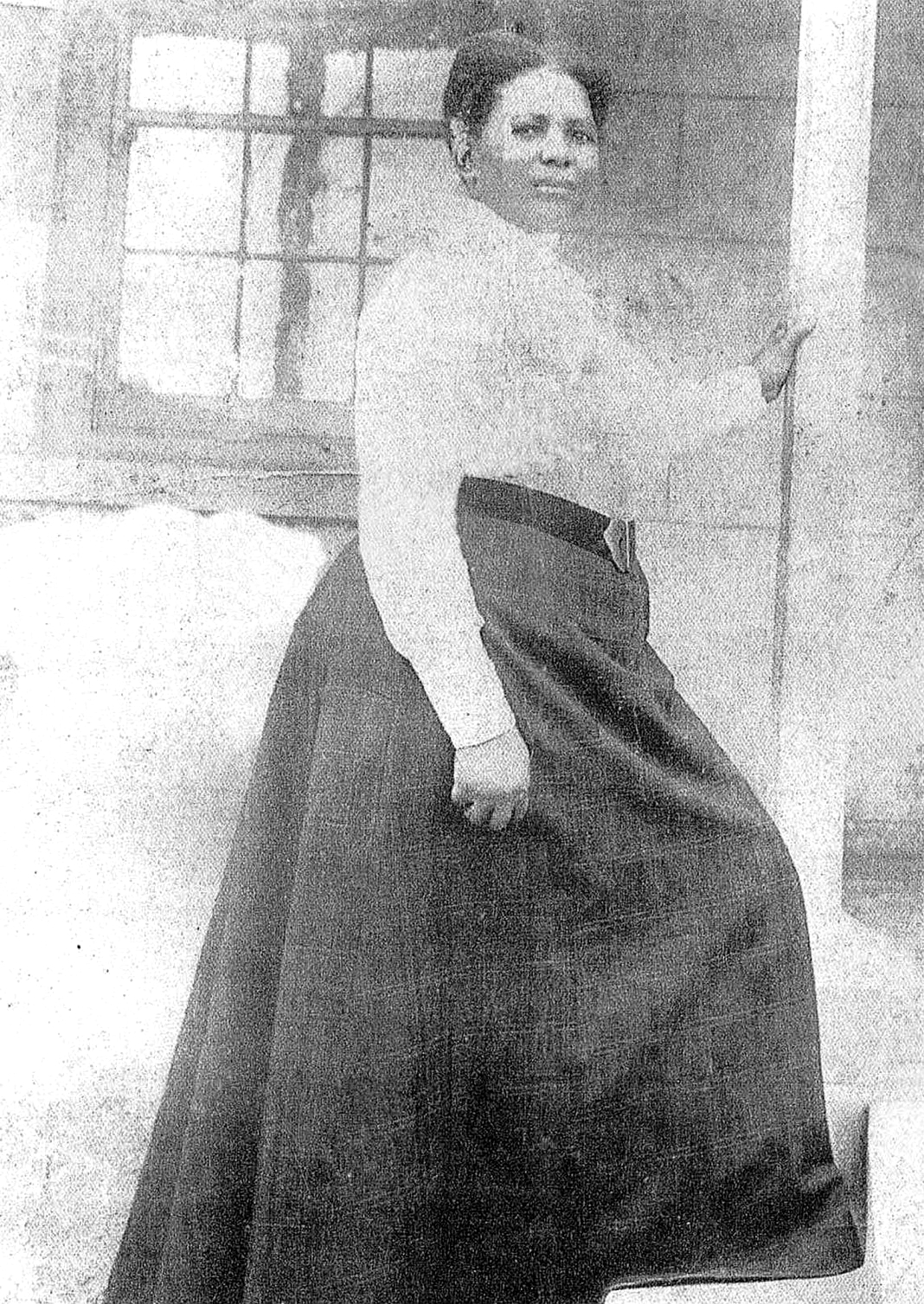
Nokutela Mdima-Dube (date unknown)

It is said that Dube inspired Lillian Tshabalala and others to found the club movement called "The Daughters of Africa", in Natal in 1932, modelled on the African-American women's club movement. The school that she co-founded with her husband was chosen by Nelson Mandela as the place where he wanted to cast his first vote in the first democratic elections in South Africa. However, Nokutela's contribution to South African education and the growth of what was to become the African National Congress was not well known. More recent research has identified that her failure to have children with John Dube contributed to not only the breakup of their marriage but it also meant her story was only known via stepchildren, nieces and nephews.

In 2012, Professor Chérif Keïta of Carleton College in Northfield, Minnesota, made a film about Nokutela Dube, Ukukhumbula uNokutela – Remembering Nokutela, and campaigned to raise awareness of her work. A headstone was erected on her grave after it was located by Keita with the help of the Johannesburg Parks Service in 2009.

in August 2016, she was inducted into Freedom Park, the national shrine for heroes and heroines in Pretoria, South Africa.

In 2017, following Professor Keïta's campaign for her recognition, Nokutela Dube was posthumously awarded South Africa's highest honour — the Order of the Golden Baobab — 100 years after her death.

In 2021, South African editor, creative consultant and archivist Asanda Sizani researched, edited and released a book that narrates Nokutela Mdima-Dube's life in multidisciplinary forms such as essays, music, art, poetry and interviews, titled Nokutela Mdima-Dube 1873–1917. Asanda Sizani then approached four women in the Arts to collaborate on what is now a multi-pronged project titled Amagama Ka Nokutela, meaning "Nokutela's words/names". The collective of collaborators are Florence Masebe, Busi Sizani and Siphokazi Jonas. In 2022, the collective Legacy Creates produced the short film Amagama ka Nokutela, premiered at the Zeitz MOCAA (Museum of Contemporary Art Africa) on 25 January 2022, the 105th anniversary of Nokutela's death.
