= Pixley ka Isaka Seme =

South African politician (1881–1951)

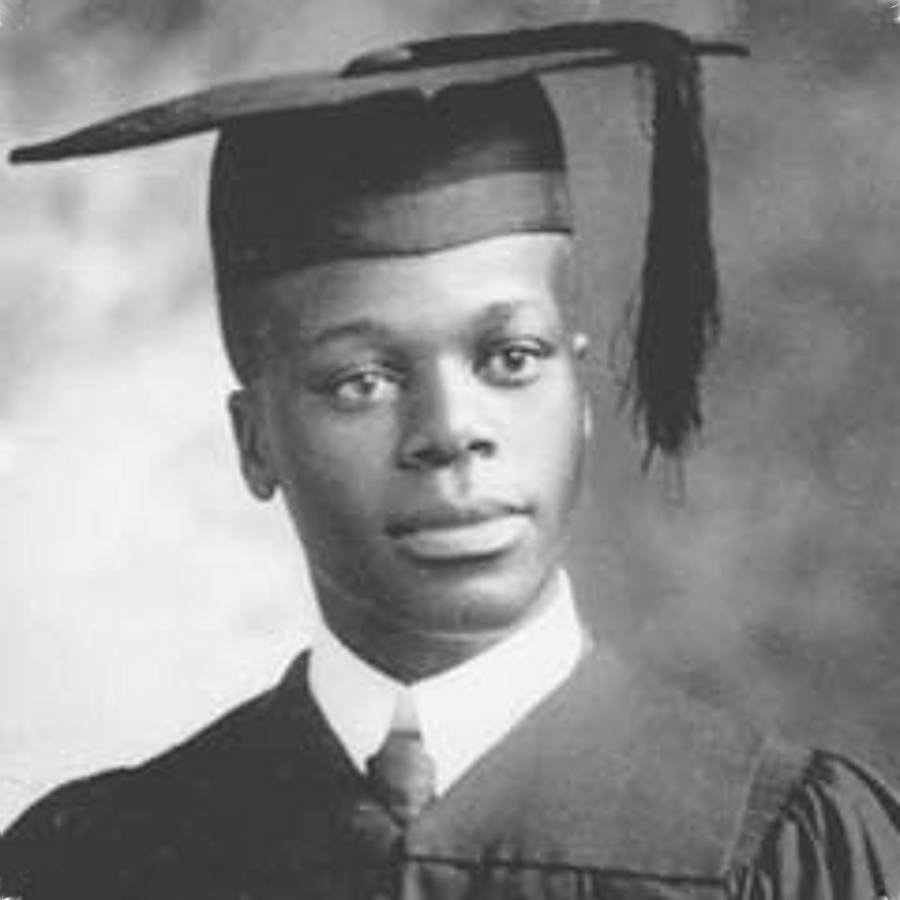
- ka Isaka Seme in 1906

President of the African National Congress
- In office 1930–1937
- Preceded by: J. T. Gumede
- Succeeded by: Z. R. Mahabane

Personal details
- Born: c. 1881/82 Durban, Inanda Mission, Colony of Natal
- Died: June 1951 (aged 69-70) Johannesburg, Union of South Africa
- Party: African National Congress
- Education: Columbia University; Jesus College, Oxford
- Occupation: Lawyer, Politician, Farmer, Newspaper proprietor, Advisor to kings

Pixley ka Isaka Seme OLS (c. 1881 – June 1951) was a South African lawyer and a founder and President of the African National Congress.

== Early life ==
Seme was born at Inanda, a small community of the American Zulu Mission of the American Board of Commissioners for Foreign Missions. He was the last-born son of Isaka Seme and Eliza Bhulose, who were prominent mission members. He had ten siblings, including four brothers: Marsh, Nompondo, Mbekwana Isaac, and Lindley Ponqela. His six sisters were Lucy, Loti, Sannah, Speke, Dalitha, and Martha. The Seme family originated from the northern parts of what is today known as KwaZulu-Natal province in an area close to the St Lucia estuary. His grandfather was Sinono, the son of Mbuyazi of Njonjo of Khuwana of Mqumbela of Sokoti of Seme. The Semes were members of the Mthethwas, one of the prominent polities in 18th and early 19th century southern Africa.

The Bhuloses, Seme's mother people, are part of a much larger clan, which includes the Ndelus, the Mselekus, and the Dumas. Seme's family was influenced by the missionaries of the American Congregational Church, which is evident in the names of Seme's siblings. His eldest brother, Marsh, for instance, was named after Rev. Samuel Marsh, the founder of the American Zulu Mission at Thafamasi in Natal, while his brother Lindley was named after Rev. Daniel Lindley, while Pixley himself took his name after Rev. Stephen Pixley. Similarly, his sisters, such as Dalitha, Lucy, Sannah, and Loti, were named after prominent female members of the American Zulu Mission. His sister, Sannah Masinga, was the mother of K.E. Masinga, the legendary broadcaster of Radio Bantu, the precursor of Ukhozi FM.

Until he arrived in Massachusetts in late 1898, Seme was known as Isaac. Only when he applied to study at Northfield Mount Hermon School did he change his name to Pixley, presumably in honour of Rev. Stephen Pixley, a missionary who had been instrumental in getting him to study in the United States of America. He changed his name again when he got to Columbia University in 1902 by adding 'ka Isaka' (son of Isaka). From then on, he became known as Pixley ka Isaka Seme.

== Education ==
Pixley started his schooling at the local mission school in Inanda. From then on, he went to study at Adams College, which is in the south of Durban. Adams, named after the missionary Dr. Newton Adams, was also an institution of the American Zulu Mission. In 1898, Seme sailed to the United States to attend high school, which he did at Mount Hermon School, MA, where he graduated in 1902 (now the Northfield Mount Hermon School). On his way to Mount Hermon School, he spent several weeks in New York, where he was hosted by John Langalibalele Dube, his uncle from Inanda, who, together with Rev. Stephen Pixley, was instrumental in getting him to study in the United States of America.

From 1902 to 1906, he was an undergraduate student at Columbia University in New York City. At Columbia, he enrolled for a Bachelor of Arts (BA) degree, and was active in the university's debating society. It was also while at Columbia that he developed a strong political consciousness, which he attributed to the vibrant political and cultural life in New York City generally and the neighbouring communities such as Harlem where he stayed for a while. In 1906, his senior year at the university, he was awarded the Curtis Medal, Columbia's highest oratorical honour. Although Seme opted to study law after his undergraduate studies, at various points in his life he expressed interest in either becoming a medical doctor or a missionary. Seme applied to pursue his legal studies at the University of Oxford in the United Kingdom. In October 1906 a member of Jesus College. He was admitted to the Middle Temple on 12 February 1907 and was Called to the Bar on 8 June 1910.

Seme returned to South Africa in 1910, and began to practice as a lawyer in Johannesburg.

== Politics ==
In 1911, Seme established the South African Native Farmers Association to encourage farm workers to buy land in the Daggakraal an area in today's Mpumalanga province, and thus attain personal independence. This led the white government to enact the Natives Land Act of 1913, barring "black" people from owning land in South Africa.

In response to the formation of the Union of South Africa, Seme worked with several other young African leaders recently returned from university studies in England, Richard Msimang, George Montsioa and Alfred Mangena, and with established leaders of the South African Native Convention in Johannesburg to promote the formation of a national organisation that would unify various African groups from the separate colonies. In January 1912, these efforts bore fruit with the founding meeting of the South African Native National Congress, later renamed the African National Congress.

Seme was also the lawyer of Queen Regent Labotsibeni of Swaziland, through whom the first ANC newspaper Abantu-Batho was financed. Later, in 1922, Seme accompanied King Sobhuza II as part of a delegation to London to meet British authorities and the King regarding the land proclamation in Swaziland.

Seme's nationalist organising among Africans paralleled the contemporaneous efforts of Mohandas Gandhi with South African Indians.

== Personal life ==
Seme was very close to the Zulu and Swazi royal families. This is primarily symbolised by his marriage to Phikisele Harriet ka Dinizulu, the daughter of the then King Dinuzulu, and to Lozinja, daughter of Swazi King Mbandzeni.
