= William Cullen Wilcox =

William and Ida Wilcox
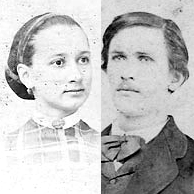
- Ida and Rev. Wilcox
- Born: August 6, 1850; Richfield, Ohio (William); December 29, 1858; Northfield, Minnesota (Ida)
- Died: January 26, 1928 (aged 77); Glendale, California (William); May 13, 1940 (aged 81); Glendale, California (Ida)
- Occupation: missionaries
- Known for: adopting John Dube and giving black people land in Natal
- Spouse: Ida Belle Clary Wilcox
- Children: eight

William Cullen Wilcox (August 6, 1850 – January 26, 1928) was an American missionary to South Africa. With his wife, Ida Belle Clary Wilcox, he "adopted" John Dube, who was to be the first President of the African National Congress and the first black founder of a South African school. Ida Wilcox taught Nokutela Mdima who was to become Nokutela Dube. The Wilcoxes arranged for black South Africans to own land, and as a result they were driven out of South Africa in 1918. The South African government conferred the Order of the Companions of O. R. Tambo on the Wilcoxes for their work in 2009. They "sacrificed all that they had in solidarity with the South African people."

== Lives ==
William Cullen Wilcox was born in Richfield, Ohio, to Jeremiah Cullen and Julia Ann (born Wilder) Wilcox. William married Ida Belle Clary Wilcox in Northfield, Minnesota, where she was born. They were to have eight children together.

They were sent to South Africa as missionaries by the American Board of Commissioners for Foreign Missions and they arrived in Inanda, north of Durban, in 1881. This was a substantial mission known as the American Zulu Mission or AZM. Ida Wilcox taught girls including the future Nokutela Dube and Ida wrote a regular contribution for Rice County Journal in Northfield, Minnesota to publicize their work.

William was asked to talk to John Dube about his poor behavior at the Adams School in Amanzimtoti. John was the son of the Reverend James Dube who was the Congregational minister at the AZM in Inanda.

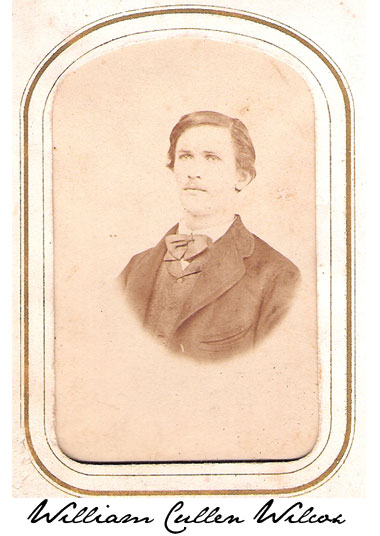

In 1887, they were returning to the United States, and Dube and his mother persuaded the missionary couple to take John Dube to the United States where he could further his education. The Wilcoxes agreed on the condition that the child was to maintain himself financially.

In 1888, Wilcox was pastor in Keene Valley Congregational church in New York and he asked Dube to visit him where Wilcox could use Dube's printing skills to create a pamphlet called "Self Support among the Kaffirs" which argued for native South Africans to use self-help to better themselves. Wilcox went on a lecture tour and took the seventeen-year-old Dube with him. Dube gave a number of lectures, which formed the basis of his pamphlet, "A Familiar Talk Upon My native Land and some things found there" (Rochester, N.Y.: R.M. Swinburne & Co. 1891?).

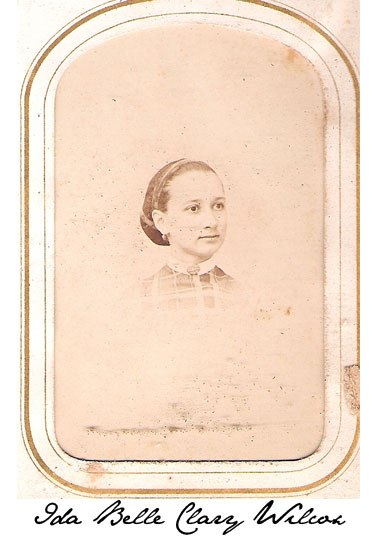

With the Wilcox's help, Dube was able to attend Oberlin College although he also had to find time to work. Dube never graduated but he gathered a basic higher education. Dube returned to Africa to found what became the Ohlange High School in 1901. (Dube founded a newspaper and he was a founder and the first President of the organisation that became the African National Congress.)

In 1909, the Wilcoxes created a company called the Zululand Industrial Improvement Company, which was owned by 300 black South Africans and themselves. The company led to acquiring land for thousands of black natives in Natal Province, which was met with disapproval by the local government.

The Wilcoxes objected to the Natives Land Act of 1913, which restricted the right of people to buy land based on their race. They organised blacks to oppose this law which not only denied them new land but also denied the use of the land to those who already owned it or who were renting it. As a result of their opposition, the couple were driven to bankruptcy in 1918 by the administration and white colonial South Africans who were afraid of what might happen if the native population was allowed to own land. They returned to the United States where their situation was described as destitute.

William and Ida Wilcox died in poverty in Glendale, California in 1928 and 1940, respectively. They were buried in the Forest Lawn Memorial Park, Glendale,.

== Legacy ==
The Wilcoxes contribution to South Africa's history was recognised when the Premier of KwaZulu-Natal, Dr Zweli Mkhize, visited Los Angeles to honour them in 2009. Various politicians and the grandson of the missionary couple, Reverend Jackson Wilcox, attended the ceremony. Mkhize said "William and Ida Belle Wilcox sacrificed all that they had in solidarity with the South African people." Their work was awarded the Order of the Companions of O. R. Tambo also in 2009 - the highest South African honour available to foreigners. The Wilcoxes were also honoured in a speech by the South African President Jacob Zuma in 2012.
