= Anthony Cope =

Anthony Cope may refer to:

- Anthony Cope (author) (died 1551), English author
- Anthony Cope (Dean of Armagh) (1713–1764)
- Anthony Cope (Dean of Elphin) (died 1705)
- Sir Anthony Cope, 1st Baronet (1548?–1614), English Member of Parliament
- Sir Anthony Cope, 4th Baronet (1632–1675), MP for Banbury and Oxfordshire
- Sir Anthony Cope, 13th Baronet (1842–1932), of the Cope baronets
- Sir Anthony Mohun Leckonby Cope, 15th Baronet (1927–1966), of the Cope baronets
- Anthony Trevor Cope, professor of Zulu

== See also ==
- Cope (surname)
