= Dhlomo =

Dhlomo is a surname. Notable people with the name include:

- Darius Dhlomo (1931–2015), South African footballer, boxer, musician and a political activist
- Herbert Isaac Ernest Dhlomo (1903–1956), South African creative writer in English
- Khanyi Dhlomo (born 1972), South African journalist and magazine editor
- Lihle Dhlomo (born 1990), South African actress
- Rolfes Robert Reginald Dhlomo (1906–1971), South African journalist, novelist and historian
- Sibongiseni Dhlomo (born 1959), South African politician and medical doctor

== See also ==
- Bongiwe Dhlomo-Mautloa (born 1956), Zulu South African printmaker, arts administrator and activist
