= Reuben Caluza =

Reuben Tholakele Caluza
- Born: November 14, 1895; Edendale, near Pietermaritzburg, South Africa
- Died: March 5, 1969 (aged 73); South Africa
- Education: Hampton University, Columbia University
- Occupations: Composer, educator
- Known for: Pioneering choral and black popular music in South Africa
- Notable work: Ixegwana (Ricksha Song), uTokoloshe, Reminiscences of Africa

Reuben Tholakele Caluza (14 November 1895 – 5 March 1969) was a Zulu composer, educator, of African choral music and Black popular music in South Africa. Caluza was known for blending traditional Zulu music with Western harmonic techniques like syncopation, his work modernized African music during the early 20th century. Caluza also played a central role in African musical theatre, using his choir performances to address social issues. His introduction of the syncopated marabi style to Zulu music left a lasting influence on South African music.

== Early life and education ==
Reuben Caluza was born in Edenvale near Pietermaritzburg, South Africa. His grandfather, John Mlungumnyama Caluza, was among the first Zulu choral conductors to teach music using staff notation. Caluza attended the Ohlange Institute from 1909 to 1914, where he formed a male quartet that toured with a mixed choir. After completing his education, he stayed on as a teacher and dedicated himself to training and conducting choirs.

In 1918 and 1921, Caluza attended Mariannhill Training College, where his choir performed his composition Ixegwana (Ricksha Song). This piece was among the first by a black South African composer to merge vernacular lyrics with ragtime rhythms.

== Career and international influence ==
In 1930, Caluza was invited by His Master's Voice to record Zulu songs with a double quintet in London. The group recorded 150 songs, 45 of which were his compositions. Following this, he traveled to the United States of America to further his education at Hampton Institute, where he earned a Bachelor's degree in music. While at Hampton, Caluza composed works such as a Rondo for orchestra and a string quartet titled Reminiscences of Africa.

Caluza later pursued a Master’s degree in Music Education at Columbia University, submitting two string quartets based on his compositions Ricksha and Go Down Moses as part of his thesis. During his time in the U.S., Caluza also organized a quartet of West African students to perform traditional Zulu songs.

Upon his return to South Africa, he became a key figure in developing African musical theatre. He was one of only five black composers mentioned in the apartheid-era South African Music Encyclopedia. His productions in the 1920s combined choir performances with dramatic storytelling to highlight social issues faced by Black South Africans. In recent years, his contributions to South African music have been reassessed, with scholars and musicians emphasizing his role in shaping early Black South African popular music.

== Return to South Africa and later career ==
Upon his return to South Africa in 1937, Caluza was appointed Head of Music at Adams College, where he trained choirs that toured the country and performed on South African Broadcasting Corporation radio. In 1947, he retired to focus on his business ventures, including managing the Sizanenjana Trading Store in Pietermaritzburg. In 1962, he returned to academia as a part-time lecturer in choral music at the University of Zululand.

== Musical style and contributions ==
Caluza was one of the first African composers to incorporate Western musical techniques such as chromaticism and syncopation into traditional Zulu music. His compositions, including Ixegwana and uTokoloshe, featured rare modulations for African compositions of the time. His influence on the development of South African black popular music, particularly in Durban, was profound, as he successfully blended ragtime with Zulu lyrics, contributing to early black musical culture.

In 2021, Caluza’s music was revived through the B-side Project by South African composer Philip Miller, in collaboration with Tshegofatso Moeng. The project reinterpreted Caluza’s music, bringing together a talented ensemble of singers and instrumentalists. The project began during the COVID-19 pandemic and drew from Caluza's original 1930 recordings with the Double Quartet. The album includes tracks such as Influenza (1918), which was written during the Spanish flu and resonates with contemporary audiences. The B-side Project was showcased at the Market Theatre in Johannesburg, featuring live video projections by Marcos Martins.

== Selected works ==
- Ixegwana (Ricksha Song), 1921
- Rondo for orchestra
- Reminiscences of Africa (string quartet)
- Numerous choral compositions, including Silu Sapa, Vukani Bansundu, uTokoloshe, and Guga Mzimba Sala Ntliziyo.

== Bibliography ==
- De Beer, Zelda: Analysis of Choral Works by the Zulu Composer Prof. R.T. Caluza, B.Mus. script, University of Pretoria, 1967.
- Huskisson, Yvonne: The Bantu Composers of Southern Africa, SABC, 1969; HSRC supplement, 1974.
- Erlmann, Veit: "But Hope Does Not Kill: Black Popular Music in Durban, 1913-1939," in The People’s City: African Life in Twentieth Century Durban, University of Natal Press, 1996.
- Van der Merwe, F.Z.: Suid-Afrikaanse Musiekbibliografie, 1787-1952, J.L. van Schaik, Pretoria, 1958.
