= AWG Champion =

South African trade unionist and activist

- Born: Allison George Champion; 4 December 1893; Tugela River Mouth
- Other names: AWG Champion
- Occupations: trade unionist, activist, writer
- Spouse: Constance Gumede

AWG Champion (4 December 1893, near the Tugela River mouth KwaZulu-Natal – 1975), was a South African trade unionist, activist, writer and public intellectual.

== Life ==
Champion schooled at Adams College near Durban, but was expelled for 'rebelliousness' before he could complete his school education. He then worked various jobs until he met Clement Kadalie in 1925 and joined the Industrial and Commercial Workers' Union (ICU) led by Kadalie.

== Political activism ==
Soon after joining the ICU in the Transvaal in 1925 Champion became second in command of the union and moved to Durban. In 1926 strongly supported the explosion of communists from the union. In 1927 when the union began to break apart he formed and led the ICU yase Natal, which became a powerful organisation in Durban and wider KwaZulu-Natal.

In 1930 he was exiled from Natal and Zululand by the colonial government.

He then became a leading figure in the African National Congress becoming the acting president-general in 1946–1947. He was a strongly conservative presence in the organisation.

In 1951 he lost the contest for the presidency of the Natal section of the ANC to Albert Luthuli after which he ran a store and became an influential convservative figure in Natal, with close relations to the Zulu royal family.

He died in 1975.

== Personal life ==
Nxumalo was married to Constance Gumede, daughter of Josiah Tshangana Gumede.

== See also ==
- Industrial and Commercial Workers Union
- African National Congress
