= Rolfes Robert Reginald Dhlomo =

Journalist and novelist (1906–1971)

- Born: 1906; Siyamu, Edendale, KwaZulu-Natal, South Africa
- Died: 1971 (aged 64–65)
- Other name: R. R. R. Dhlomo
- Occupations: Journalist, novelist and historian
- Notable work: An African Tragedy (1928)
- Relatives: Herbert Dhlomo (brother)

Rolfes Robert Reginald Dhlomo (1906–1971), who published as R. R. R. Dhlomo, was a South African journalist, novelist and historian born in Siyamu, Edendale, in the province of KwaZulu. His novella An African Tragedy, published in 1928, was the first fiction work written by a black South African to appear in book form in the English language. Together with his brother Herbert, he worked as a journalist and editor for the journals The Bantu World and Ilanga lase Natal. He wrote his later novels in isiZulu.

He wrote five historical novels about Zulu kings, which have been used extensively as school readers on South African history during apartheid, up until now.

His Selected Short Stories was originally published in 1975 by the Institute for the Study of English in Africa. A revised edition was published in South Africa by the Institute for the Study of English in Africa, Rhodes University, in 1996 (ISBN 0-86810-307-1).

== Sources ==
- Chapman, Michael. 2003. Southern African Literatures, University of Natal Press. ISBN 1-86914-028-1
