= Ekukhanyeni mission station =

The Ekukhanyeni mission station (Ekukhanyeni = "place of enlightenment") was established by John William Colenso, the first Bishop of Natal, in 1854. The Zulu language writer Magema Magwaza Fuze was educated there from about the age of 12.
