= Zacharias Richard Mahabane =

South African politician (1881–1971)

Zacharias Richard Mahabane, OLG (15 August 1881 – September 1971) was a South African politician. He was the President of the African National Congress from 1924 to 1927 and again from 1937 to 1940. He was also a Methodist pastor.

== Early life ==
Zacharias Richard Mahabane was born in the town of Thaba Nchu, Orange Free State and his parents were farmers. After his primary school education at a local Methodist Mission School in Thaba Nchu, he attended the Morija Mission Institute in Basutoland now, Lesotho which was the homeland of his father, an establishment of the Paris Evangelical Mission. In 1901 at the age of twenty, he qualified as a teacher there, he then later gave up teaching to become a court interpreter in a career that lasted until 1908. Later during 1908 he began theological training at the Lessyton Theological School near Queenstown. He was ordained as a Methodist minister in 1914. He was first sent to Bensonvale Parish and later Cape Town.

== Personal life ==
Mahabane was married to Harriet Mantoro, they went on to have three daughters and two sons. Harriet was President of the National Council of African Women of Kimberley in 1936. He died at Kroonstad, Free State, in September 1971.

== Political life ==
Reverend Mahabane went to Cape Town in 1916, where he joined the South African National Native Congress (Cape Branch), and was elected as local President in 1919 at age 38. Along with the Coloured leader Dr A. Abdurahman, he organised the Non-European Unity Conferences between 1927 and 1934 where Africans, Coloureds and Indians discussed their common grievances and ideals.

He was elected the President of the African National Congress from 1924 to 1927, he was opposed to communism and hence opposed J.T. Gumede. In 1925 he was also elected as the Vice President of the Cape Native Voters’ Convention. He traveled to Europe in 1926 in connection with the ANC, and in 1927 and 1937 for missionary conferences. In the middle of 1927 the Church sent Reverend Mahabane and his wife to Kimberly where they remained until their departure in January 1937. While in Kimberley he had also been the Secretary of the African Christian Minister's Association of the Diamond Fields. In the year of 1937 when he was elected President of the ANC for his second term, he left Kimberley for Winburg in the Free State. Mahabane was a member of the 1936 All-African Convention delegation that conferred with Prime Minister J. B. M. Hertzog prior to the submission of the separate-roll compromise to Parliament. Mahabane and ZK Matthews were elected to the executive, Mahabane becoming Vice president in 1937. Mahabane acted as vice-president of the AAC, and from 1940 to 1954 he served as the AAC's official vice-president.

When his term as ANC President ended in 1940 he became the official Chaplain to the ANC and was elected as a Lifelong Honorary President of the ANC in 1943. During the 1940s he concentrated more on the AAC, and on the Non-European Unity Movement, of which he became President at its foundation in 1945, remaining in that position until 1956 when he resigned. In the 1940s he concentrated on religious organizations, this included the Inter-Denominational African Minister's Federation that was founded in 1945. He became its President in 1963.

== Original Writings ==
- In 1923 he wrote his debut book entitled: “The Colour Bar in South Africa”.
- Prior to his death, he wrote another which would be his last entitled: “The Good Fight: Selected Speeches of Rev. Zacchaeus R. Mahabane”, under his name, but edited by G. M. Carter and S. W. Johns, of Evanston: Northwestern University.
