= Reuben Tholakele Guluza =

South African educator and author (1895–1965)

Reuben Tholakele Galuza
- Born: 1895; Natal, South Africa
- Died: 1965 (aged 69–70)
- Occupations: Educator, author, school principal
- Known for: Principal of Adams College; opposition to Bantu Education

Reuben Tholakele Galuza (1895–1965), commonly known as R. T. Galuza, was a South African educator and author who served as principal of Adams College. He is known for his opposition to the implementation of the Bantu Education Act of 1953 and for his contributions to African language education, particularly IsiZulu.

== Early life and education ==
Reuben Tholakele Galuza was born in Natal (present-day KwaZulu-Natal) in 1895. He was educated in Christian mission schools, which were central to providing formal education to Black South Africans during the late nineteenth and early twentieth centuries. He later trained as a teacher and became involved in curriculum development and African language instruction.

== Career ==
Galuza began his career as an educator before rising to become principal of Adams College, a mission school located near Amanzimtoti. Adams College was one of the most influential institutions educating Black South Africans and produced several political, religious, and intellectual leaders. During his tenure, Galuza emphasized academic excellence and encouraged intellectual and cultural development among African students.

== Opposition to Bantu Education ==
The apartheid government introduced the Bantu Education Act, 1953, which centralized control over Black education and implemented racially segregated curricula designed to restrict educational advancement.

Mission institutions, including Adams College, resisted government attempts to impose Bantu Education. Galuza opposed the policy, arguing that it lowered educational standards and undermined independent African education. Following government control over mission schools, he left Adams College as part of broader resistance among educators and missionary organizations.

== Literary contributions ==
Galuza contributed to the development of isiZulu educational materials and textbooks. His work formed part of early efforts to formalize African language instruction within South African schooling systems.

His works include:

- uHlala Kula
- Izincwadi zabafundi
