= Magema Magwaza Fuze =

Zulu writer and journalist (c. 1844–1922)

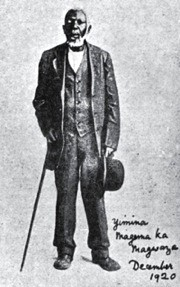
- December 1920
- Born: c. 1840; Zululand
- Died: 1922 (aged 81–82)
- Education: Ekukhanyeni mission station
- Occupations: Printer and author
- Known for: Author of Abantu Abamnyama Lapa Bavela Ngakona
- Parent: Magwaza

Magema Magwaza Fuze (c. 1844–1922) was the author of Abantu Abamnyama Lapa Bavela Ngakona (The Black People and Whence They Came), the first book in the Zulu language published by a native speaker of the language.

Born near Pietermaritzburg, Colony of Natal, he was brought up from about 12 years of age by Bishop John William Colenso and was baptized into the Anglican Church of Southern Africa. Following his education at the mission, he trained as a printer and compositor on Bishop Colenso's press before starting his own printing business. He wrote for a number of Zulu newspapers and in 1896 travelled to the island of Saint Helena to be the secretary to Dinuzulu kaCetshwayo, exiled king of the Zulus, before returning to Natal in 1898.

Abantu Abamnyama was published in 1922 and in an English translation in 1979. It has been described as one of the principal sources for the history of the Zulu people.

== Early life ==
Magema Magwaza Fuze was born near present-day Pietermaritzburg in Zululand around 1840 to Magwaza, son of Matomela, son of Thoko. The amaFuze were a sub-clan of the amaNgcobo. Nothing is known of his mother. His birth name was Manawami but he was given the nickname Skelemu, possibly derived from the Afrikans word skelm for rascal or trickster. He told his parents that he would not be raised at home but would work for an important white man.

Fuze was raised from the age of about 12 by John William Colenso, the first Bishop of Natal. His year of birth was estimated by Colenso on the basis that Fuze was about 12 years old when he first met him. Colenso converted him to Christianity and baptised him in 1859, giving him the Zulu name Magema. Colenso never gave his converts English or Biblical names. He was educated at the Ekukhanyeni ("place of enlightenment") mission station.

== Career ==
In the 1850s, Fuze trained as a printing compositor on Bishop Colenso's printing press. He was writing in Zulu from a young age and chose to write only in that language. His first piece was an essay describing the daily activities at Ekukhanyeni. Another early piece was an account of day to day dialogue in Zulu, Amazwi Abantu (The People's Voices). He first appeared in print in J. W. Colenso's, Three Native Accounts (1860) telling his experience of Colenso's visit to King Mpande in 1859.

He printed Bibles using the press at Ekukhanyeni during Colenso's trips to England and eventually set up his own printing business in Pietermaritzburg His account of his solo visit to Zululand in 1877 was published in MacMillan's Magazine in 1878 as "A Visit to King Ketshwayo". He also wrote letters to and articles for newspapers such as Ilanga lase Natal and Ipepo Lo Hlanga.

In 1896 he travelled to the island of Saint Helena to be the secretary to Dinuzulu kaCetshwayo, king of the Zulus, who was in exile on the island after leading a rebellion. While on the island he entered into a correspondence with Alice Werner of the School of Oriental Studies. He returned to Natal with Dinuzulu on the SS Umbilo, early in 1898.

Some time after 1900 Fuze wrote Abantu Abamnyama Lapa Bavela Ngakona at the request of the readers of his journalism, but it was not immediately published due to lack of money. It was published privately in 1922, making Fuze the first native Zulu-speaker to publish a book in the language. It was reviewed by Alice Werner in the Journal of the African Society, one of the few reviews given to it at the time, but not until 1931. It was published in English in 1979 by the University of Natal Press in the Killie Campbell Africana Library as The Black People and Whence They Came: A Zulu View in a translation by Harry Camp Lugg edited by professor Trevor Cope.

Hlonipha Mokoena of the University of the Witwatersrand describes the book as significant not just for its use of the Zulu language and its historical content which makes it one of the principal sources of Zulu history, but as an example of the work of one of the group of mission-educated converts to Christianity known in South Africa as the amakhowla (believers) who marked the transition from an oral tradition to a literate culture.

== Death and legacy ==
Fuze died in 1922. A selection of his papers is held in the Campbell Collections of the University of KwaZulu-Natal. In 2011, he was the subject of a biography, Magema Fuze: The Making of a Kholwa Intellectual, by Hlonipha Mokoena published by the University of KwaZulu-Natal Press.

== Selected publications ==
- "Indaba Ka'Magema" & "Magema's Story" in John William Colenso, Three Native Accounts of the Visit of the Bishop of Natal in September and October, 1859, to Umpande, King of the Zulus &c. 1860. pp. 1–13 & pp. 107–121.
- "A Visit to King Ketshwayo", MacMillan's Magazine, 1878.
- Abantu Abamnyama Lapa Bavela Ngakona. Privately published, 1922.
- The Black People and Whence They Came. Translated by Harry Camp Lugg and edited by Anthony Trevor Cope. University of Natal Press, Pietermaritzburg, 1979. (Killie Campbell Africana library. Translation series, No. 1) ISBN 0869801678
