= Alfred Mangena =

South African politician and lawyer

- Born: c. 1879; Estcourt, Natal Colony
- Died: 1924; Umtata, Cape Province
- Occupations: Lawyer, political activist, journalist
- Known for: One of the earliest Black attorneys admitted to practise law in South Africa; early African nationalism

Alfred Mangena (c. 1879–1924) was a South African lawyer, political activist, and journalist. He is recognized as one of the earliest Black attorneys admitted to practice law in South Africa and as a leading figure in the early African nationalist movement. Mangena was a founding leader of the South African Native National Congress (SANNC), later renamed the African National Congress (ANC).

== Early life and education ==
Alfred Mangena was born around 1879 in Estcourt, in the former Natal Colony. He received early education in South Africa before travelling to England for further studies. He enrolled at Lincoln’s Inn in London, where he studied law and was called to the Bar in 1909, becoming one of the first Black South Africans to qualify in law in Britain.

== Legal career ==
Mangena returned to South Africa in 1910 and applied for admission as an attorney of the Supreme Court. His application was opposed by the Transvaal Law Society on racial grounds, but the court ruled that race could not be used to bar a qualified applicant from legal practice. His admission marked an important early breakthrough for Black legal practitioners in South Africa.

He established a legal practice in Pretoria and Johannesburg, representing Black South Africans in a racially discriminatory legal system. In 1916, Mangena entered into partnership with Pixley ka Isaka Seme, forming the firm Mangena & Seme Solicitors, one of the first Black-owned law firms in South Africa.

== Political activism ==
In 1912, Mangena was elected Senior Treasurer of the South African Native National Congress at its founding conference in Bloemfontein. The organization was formed to unite African leaders in opposition to discriminatory legislation and political exclusion.

Mangena was actively involved in campaigns opposing the Natives Land Act of 1913, which restricted African land ownership. He also participated in political delegations and advocacy efforts challenging segregationist policies imposed by the Union government.

In addition to his legal and political work, Mangena founded and published a newspaper, the Native Advocate, which provided a platform for African political commentary and resistance during the early twentieth century.

== Death ==
Alfred Mangena died in 1924 at his home in Umtata, in the present-day Eastern Cape. His death was regarded as a significant loss to the African legal and political community of the period.

== Legacy ==
Alfred Mangena is remembered as a pioneer of the Black legal profession in South Africa and a foundational figure in early African nationalism. His admission to the legal profession and his political activism helped open pathways for later generations of Black lawyers and leaders.

== See also ==
- Pixley ka Isaka Seme
- South African Native National Congress
- African National Congress
- Natives Land Act, 1913
