= Hlonipha Mokoena =

South African historian

Hlonipha Mokoena is a South African historian at the Wits Institute for Social and Economic Research of the University of the Witwatersrand. She is a specialist in South African intellectual history. She formerly worked in the anthropology department at Columbia University. She received her PhD from the University of Cape Town in 2005. Her book, Magema Fuze: The Making of a Kholwa Intellectual, is about Magema Magwaza Fuze, the first Zulu-speaker to publish a book in the language.

== Selected publications ==
- "An Assembly of Readers: Magema Fuze and His Ilanga Lase Natal Readers", Journal of Southern African Studies, Vol. 35, No. 3 (Sep., 2009), pp. 595–607.
- Magema Fuze: The Making of a Kholwa Intellectual. University of KwaZulu-Natal Press, 2011. ISBN 978-1869141912
