= D. McK Malcolm =

Daniel McK Malcolm (died 1962) was chief inspector of Bantu education and later the first lecturer of the University of Natal at the Zulu.

== Selected publications ==
- Ezasekhaya ... Ikhishwa Kaɓusha. Icindezelwa Kaɓusha. London, 1939.
- A Zulu Manual for Beginners. Longmans, Green & Co., London & Cape Town, 1949.
- Izibongo. Zulu praise-poems. Collected by James Stuart. Translated by Daniel Malcolm. Edited with introductions and annotations by Anthony Trevor Cope. Clarendon Press, Oxford, 1968.
