= Trevor Cope =

South African academic

Anthony Trevor Cope known as Trevor Cope is an emeritus professor of Zulu (renamed African Language and Literature) at the University of Natal (renamed as the University of KwaZulu Natal). He edited Harry Camp Lugg's translation of Magema Magwaza Fuze's Abantu Abamnyama (1922) into English which was published by the University of Natal Press in 1979 as The Black People and Whence They Came.

Trevor Cope was born in Durban, South Africa on 1st August 1928, and upon retiring from the then University of Natal, emigrated with his wife, June, to Sydney, Australia, where he now lives.

== Selected publications ==
- Izibongo. Zulu praise-poems. Collected by James Stuart. Translated by Daniel Malcolm. Edited with introductions and annotations by Anthony Trevor Cope. Clarendon Press, Oxford, 1968.
- A Select Bibliography Relating to the Zulu People of Natal and Zululand. 1974.
- A Comprehensive Course in the Zulu Language. University of Natal, 1982.
- The Black People and Whence They Came. Magema Magwaza Fuze, translated by Harry Camp Lugg and edited by Anthony Trevor Cope. University of Natal Press, Pietermaritzburg, 1979. (Killie Campbell Africana library. Translation series, No. 1) ISBN 0869801678
- Zulu Phonology, Tonology and Tonal Grammar. 1986.
- UMamazane = Mamazane. R.H. Mthembu, translated into English by D.M. Mzolo and Anthony Trevor Cope. Solo Collective, Cowies Hill, South Africa, 2003.
