= Ipepo Lo Hlanga =

Ipepo Lo Hlanga was an early Zulu language newspaper. It was published from Pietermaritzburg in Natal from 1894 to April 1904. Among its contributors was Magema Magwaza Fuze.
