= Andile Fikizolo =

South African soccer player

Personal information
- Full name: Andile Eugene Fikizolo
- Date of birth: 13 May 1994 (age 32)
- Place of birth: Inanda, South Africa
- Height: 1.69 m (5 ft 7 in)
- Position: Midfielder

Team information
- Current team: Golden Arrows
- Number: 34

Youth career
- Golden Arrows

Senior career*
Years	Team	Apps	(Gls)
2013–2014	Thanda Royal Zulu		
2014–2015	SuperSport United	2	(0)
2015–2018	Golden Arrows	33	(10)
2018–2019	Royal Eagles	11	(2)
2019–2021	Bloemfontein Celtic	24	(2)
2021–	Golden Arrows	13	(0)

International career^{‡}
2016	South Africa Olympic	1	(0)
- * Club domestic league appearances and goals as of 13 November 2022 ‡ National team caps and goals as of 13 November 2022

Andile Eugene Fikizolo (born 13 May 1994), also known as Carot, is a South African soccer player who plays as a midfielder and right wing for Golden Arrows in the South African Premier Soccer League.
