= Herbert Isaac Ernest Dhlomo =

South African writer

Herbert Isaac Ernest Dhlomo (1903, Siyamu/Pietermaritzburg (Natal) – 20 October 1956, Durban) is one of the major founding figures of South African literature and perhaps the first prolific African creative writer in English. His younger brother was the artist R. R. R. Dhlomo, and the great Zulu composer, R. T. Caluza, is a near relative. Dhlomo himself held many jobs during his short life, but always regarded his literary production as his major achievement:

"My creative life is the greatest thing I can give to my people, to Africa. I am determined to die writing and writing and writing. And no one … can stop, fight or destroy that. It is the soul, the heart and, the spirit. It will endure and speak truth even if I perish…I have chosen the path to serve my people by means of literature, and nothing will deflect me from this course."

== Biography ==
=== Early years ===
Born in Natal Colony, Dhlomo was educated in local schools, before training as a teacher at Adams College. He subsequently taught for some years in Johannesburg. He was very active in social affairs during the 1920s, which resulted in several articles published by him in newspapers such as Ilanga Lase Natal in Durban and Bantu World.

=== Politics ===
At the time he also became active for a body called the Bantu Dramatic Society and the ANC. In 1935 he finally left the teaching profession to join the staff of Bantu World. During this time of the 1920s and 1930s the black population in the area strove to emancipate themselves with the help of influential white liberals against the conservative white majority who held all political power. Herbert Dhlomo soon became one of the major figures of the new black elite. The catchphrase of the time was "progressive" and The African Yearly Register of the time described Dhlomo as "a young man of fine personality, very progressive in his ideas", which at this time meant that he was open towards the achievements of Western modernity.

=== Literary career ===
This Progressivism was part of Dhlomo's earlier writing and centred on Western-style education, "civilisation", moderation, anti-tribalism etc. Examples of this kind in Dhlomo's writing are The Girl who Killed to Save and Ntsikana, which are in the line of Progressivist ideas and justify white policy. Native Africans were supposed to be the junior partners of the whites in politics and literature, a relationship that was supposed to develop eventually into racial equality. The literature they produced was meant for a mission press, and its aim was to keep the political situation quiet rather than to ameliorate it for the blacks.

=== Final years ===
Having worked as a librarian from 1937 to 1941, he finally became assistant editor of Ilanga Lase Natal in 1943, a position that he held until his death. In addition, he was a prolific playwright and produced many popular dramas including: The Girl Who Killed To Save (1935); Shaka; The Living Dead; Cetywayo; Men and Women; Dingana; Moshoeshoe; Workers Boss Bosses; Ntsikana and Mofologi. As a poet, he often published his work first in Ilanga Lase Natal, and his best known collection, The Valley of a Thousand Hills, was produced in 1941.

== Literature ==
=== Literary style ===
He increasingly dedicated his life to writing and gradually shifted his position away from progressivism, which seemed not to progress very much, to slightly more radical political viewpoints. A certain bitterness in Dhlomo's writing sets in with the play Cetshwayo in 1936, which was probably due to a resentment of the social control exercised by the white liberals whose ‘support’ was increasingly seen as suppression or at least impediment of real social progress.

Cetshwayo is a very good example of the difficulties of Dhlomo's style. The play, apart from what critics have called "subromantic diction", has long novelistic passages that make it difficult as a text for reading and nearly unplayable on the stage. A short passage from Cetshwayo illustrates the turning away from missionary (Christian) thought: in the scene, one tribal warrior has just slain a rival in a duel as a Christian convert comes along the path. The ensuing dialogue pits tribal against missionary ideas of order and illuminates Dhlomo's radicalisation and his bitter break with the Missionary environment that formed him.

Convert: What have you done?
Warrior: Stop that! I don’t like it! When a person asks about what he knows and sees, he sees and knows what he does not ask. He is a liar and a fraud, a spy.
Convert: I am sorry, brother. I do not fight.
Warrior: I know. Christians do not fight. It is not Christian. They cheat, ruin, feign, find fault and drag people down.
Convert: Surely you are mistaken…
Warrior: Christian, hold your tongue! Don’t interrupt me! Look after yourself. You are nearer death than you think!
Convert: You w-won’t k-kill me, b-brother!
Warrior: We kill Christians! A Christian is only good dead! Living, he is either useful and honest or not Christian. (…)

What Dhlomo otherwise attempted to produce was a "literary drama" based on the grand themes of the deeds of past heroes, rather than stage vehicles for immediate political agitation on the stage. This kind of drama Dhlomo wrote rested on the belief that "the tragedy of a Job, an Oedipus, a Hamlet, a Joan, a Shaka, a Nongqause, is the tragedy of all countries, all times, all races". He thus prefigured many later African writers in the 20th century, such as Wole Soyinka, Ngũgĩ wa Thiong'o, Chinua Achebe and many others, whose bi-cultural education and background made them see the parallels between the basic mythical structures that underlie most cultures.

=== Poetry ===
Dhlomo also wrote poems – mostly published by his brother R. R. R. Dhlomo – such as Fired – Lines on an African Intellectual being sacked by White Liberals for his independent ideas. Dhlomo's personal grievance coincided with a general trend, strengthened by the nationalistic ideas held by the ANC of the time. The general trend from tutelage to protest, to resistance against political oppression of blacks has its roots in that era and continues to the very day. One of Dhlomo's patriotic and protest poems is On Munro Bridge, Johannesburg, from which the following section was taken to represent Dhlomo's concerns at the time:

(…) Jerusalem can boast no better sight,
For here the veld with glorious scenes is dight.
O sweet miniature Edens of the north!
O glorious homes! Is gold but all your worth?
Shall Belial rule forever in your towers,
Polluting all this beauty, all your hours?
How can you rest content so near the hells
Of poverty where Moloch fiercely dwells;
Where children die of hunger and neglect.
While city Fathers boast suburbs select;
Where minds diseased and dead to Love make gains
Through drunkards, widows, waifs and worker’s pains (…)

=== Contemporary writings ===
During his last years, Dhlomo wrote almost exclusively on contemporary matters, which he sought to render in a dynamic and lively form. The past now informed his writing only where it was supposed to be usable for social comment and action. This work of the 1940s actually exhibits streaks of both Marxism and Nationalism when it talks about the exploitation of black workers and understands itself as a "fight with greater confidence to become a citizen of the country of our birth", respectively.

== Legacy ==
As Dhlomo died after a long illness in 1956, his literary oeuvre was already considerable: dozens of plays and short stories, and over one hundred poems complement his regular editorial and political work. Nearly half of his known work, however, has been lost, due to writer's relatively long obscurity amongst other African writers better known today. Dhlomo was nevertheless a key figure among the early generation of writers, including Sol Plaatje and Thomas Mofolo, who established a literary tradition for the more recent generation(s) to build on.

== Sources ==
- Tim Couzens (1985). The New African: A Study of the Life and Work of H. I. E. Dhlomo. Johannesburg: Ravan.
- Nick Visser and Tim Couzens (1985). H. I. E Dhlomo: Collected works. Johannesburg: Ravan.
