= Kleinfontein, KwaZulu-Natal =

Kleinfontein
- Location within KwaZulu-Natal Location within South Africa
- Coordinates: 28.361°S 29.644°E
- Country: South Africa
- Province: KwaZulu-Natal
- District: uThukela
- Municipality: Alfred Duma

Area
  - Total: 16.70 km^{2} (6.45 sq mi)

Population (2011)
  - Total: 3,595
  - Density: 215.3/km^{2} (557.5/sq mi)

Racial makeup (2011)
  - Black African: 99.7%
  - White: 0.3%

First languages (2011)
  - Zulu: 95.6%
  - Other: 4.4%
- Time zone: UTC+2 (SAST)

Kleinfontein is a town in Uthukela District Municipality in the KwaZulu-Natal province of South Africa.
