= Mthethwa =

Mthethwa may refer to:

- Mthethwa Paramountcy, a Southern African state that arose in the 18th century south of Delagoa Bay and inland in eastern southern Africa
- Nathi Mthethwa (1967–2025), South African politician and diplomat
- Zwelakhe Mthethwa, South African politician
