= Newton Adams =

American physician (1804–1851)

- Born: 4 August 1804; East Bloomfield, Ontario County, New York, U.S.
- Died: 16 September 1851 (aged 47); Adams Mission, Natal (in modern-day South Africa)
- Known for: Missionary work in Africa

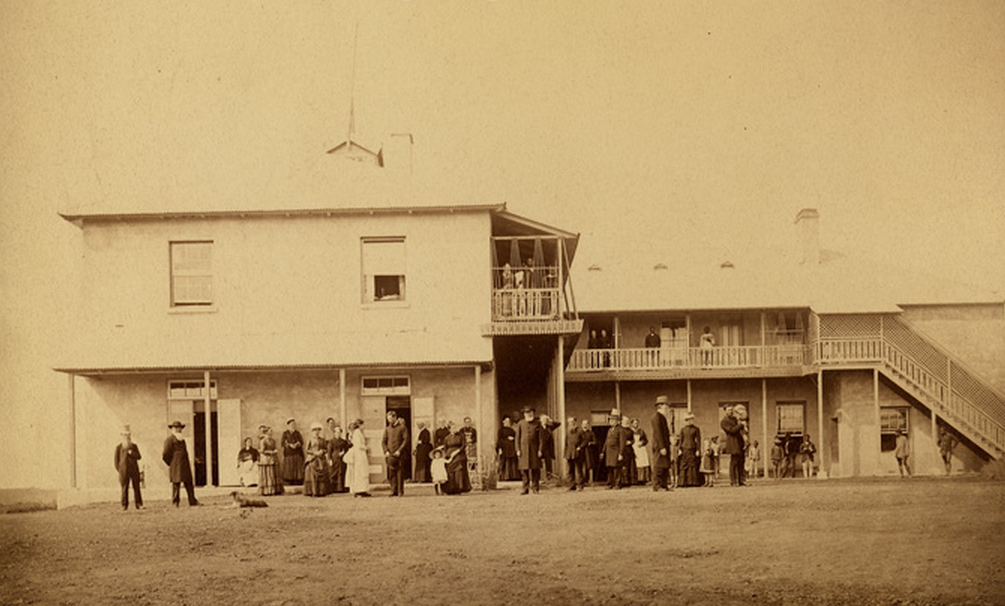
The Adams Mission, near Amanzimtoti pictured in 1886

Newton Adams (August 4, 1804 – September 16, 1851) was an American missionary and medical doctor who worked in southern Africa. Adams worked as a medical doctor in New York City for a short while prior to volunteering to serve as a physician with the American Board of Commissioners for Foreign Missions. Sent to a mission in Natal, southern Africa Adams became one of the first doctors in that region. He was later ordained and established a mission at Adams Mission, where he taught and preached in addition to providing medical care. After his death the Adams College was established and named for him.

== Early life ==
Adams was born in East Bloomfield, Ontario County in New York on 4 August 1804. He attended Hamilton College and subsequently practised medicine in New York City for around two years. A Congregationalist Christian, he volunteered for missionary work with the American Board of Commissioners for Foreign Missions (ABCFM). He was appointed physician to a mission sent to work amongst the Zulu and Matabele tribes. He left the US from Boston on December 3, 1834, accompanied by his wife who came from Ohio. His ABCFM colleagues on board the same vessel were missionary Daniel Lindley, medical doctor Alexander Erwin Wilson, George Champion, Aldin Grout, Henry Venable and their wives. Adams and Wilson became the first two medical doctors to settle in Natal.

== Missionary work ==
Arriving in Natal in 1835 George Champion established a mission station at Umlazi with Adams as his physician. Adams also ran a school and printing press at Umlazi and received permission from Zulu King Dingane to practise medicine and print pamphlets in the Zulu language. Adams was assisted by Mbalasi who was the widow of a Zulu chief. Mbalasi and her daughter Nembula lived with the Adams family. The Zulus plundered the station in 1838. Ordained as a priest in 1844 Adams frequently preached to congregations of up to 1,000 people. His school provided an education to 100 pupils at a time and his medical skills were sought out by British colonists, Boers and indigenous peoples alike. He became known to the Zulus as "the teacher with three coats" for his practice of changing his clothes to suit his differing areas of work (including a white medical coat).

Adams moved his mission to a location near Amanzimtoti in 1847 and the settlement that grew around it would later become known as Adams Mission. He was appointed in 1847 as a mediator on the Natal Land Commission set up to establish native reserves in the country. Adams died at Adams Mission on September 16, 1851; his funeral was attended by many of Durban's most prominent residents and military officers. The Amanzimtoti Institute was established by the ABCFM in 1853 and was later named Adams College in his honour.
