= John Langalibalele Dube =

South African writer and politician (1871–1946)

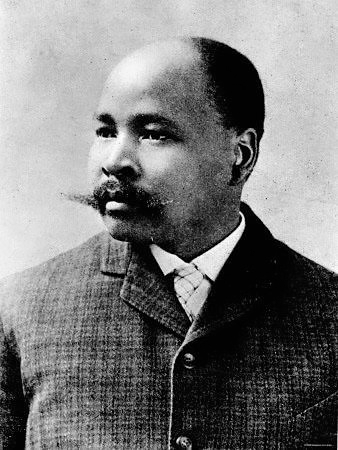
- Dube c. 1910
- Born: 22 February 1871; Inanda, Colony of Natal
- Died: 11 February 1946 (aged 75)
- Occupations: Writer; Educator; Politician
- Known for: Founding president of the South African Native National Congress
- Notable work: uShembe (in Zulu) (1936) A Biography of Isaiah Shembe, Shuter & Shooter Publishers Pty Ltd, Pietermaritzburg
- Spouse: Nokutela Dube (née Mdima) (m. 1894; died 1917)

John Langalibalele Dube OLG (22 February 1871 – 11 February 1946) was a South African essayist, philosopher, educator, politician, publisher, editor, novelist and poet. He was the founding president of the South African Native National Congress (SANNC), which became the African National Congress in 1923. He was an uncle to Dr Pixley ka Isaka Seme, with whom he founded SANNC. Dube served as the president of SANNC between 1912 and 1917. He was brought to America by returning missionaries and attended Oberlin Preparatory Academy.

He returned to South Africa, where in 1901 he and his first wife, Nokutela Dube, founded the Ohlange High School based on the Tuskegee Institute founded by Booker T. Washington. In 1903, the Dubes founded the isiZulu newspaper Ilanga (now Ilanga lase Natal). In 1930, John Dube published Shaka's Body Servant. He died in 1946.

== Early life ==
John Langalibalele Dube was born to James and Elizabeth in Natal at the Inanda mission station of the American Zulu Mission (AZM), a branch of the American Board of Commissioners for Foreign Missions. The AZM later merged with sister Congregational mission churches of the London Missionary Society and Congregational Union of South Africa to form the United Congregational Church of Southern Africa (UCCSA). His father, the Reverend James Dube, was one of the first ordained African pastors of the AZM. Dube began his formal education in Inanda and Adams College, Amanzimtoti. The Reverend William Cullen Wilcox was called in to talk to Dube, who was misbehaving at the Adams School. His father James Dube was then the Congregational minister at Inanda.

In 1887, the Wilcox family were returning to the United States and John Dube and his mother persuaded the missionary couple to take Dube to America, where he could further his education. The Cullens agreed, on the condition that Dube was to maintain himself financially; however, they advised him, and William found him his first work on the road gang when he arrived in America. In late 1888, Dube enrolled at Oberlin Academy Preparatory School and, although he studied printing and self-help, he did not graduate. While in the US, he published his first book, A Familiar Talk Upon My Native Land and Some Things Found There.

In 1893, he returned to Inanda, where in January 1894 he married Nokutela Mdima.

== Statesman ==
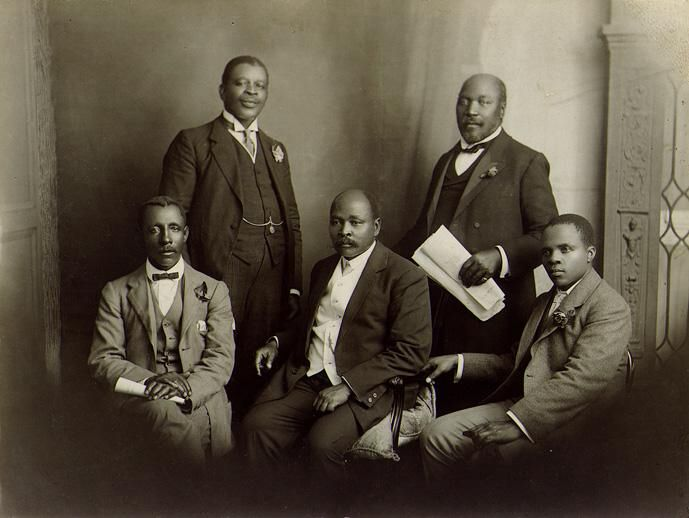
The South African Native National Congress delegation to England, June 1914. Left to right: Thomas Mapike, Rev. Walter Rubusana, Dube, Saul Msane, Sol Plaatje

For a missionary-educated person, there was conflict between the newly arrived Western education and African traditional society. However, Dube navigated this social schism with a statesman-like ability, as in his later years, when he was able to win the trust of the Zulu royal family. It is conceivable that Dube would never have been part of the SANC, except that his teaching and discourse on the necessity of unity chimed in with the then-nascent political atmosphere.

As part of a delegation, he travelled to London in 1909 to protest the Act of Union, and returned in 1914 to protest the Land Act.

Dube's speeches as president of a black political mass-movement have never been made available.

The next formation of black people into a coherent socio-political movement was to come into being with Marcus Garvey's Universal Negro Improvement Association and African Communities League, founded in 1914. In his politics Dube was cautious and conservative, yet he was forthright on the rights of blacks and the paramount tenet of unity - he foresaw the necessity of the unity of black people long before Garvey came to the international scene.

== Educator ==
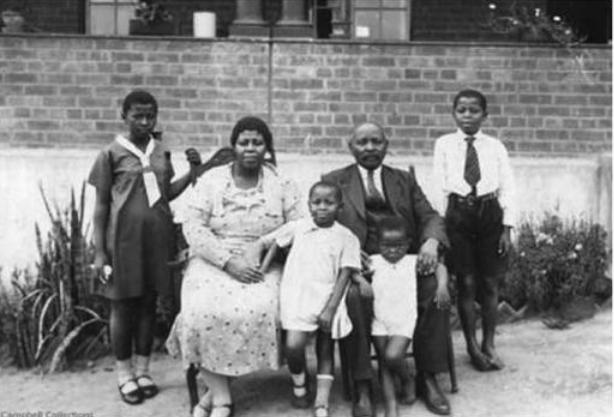
Mid-1930s, Dube and his second wife Angelina, with (l. to r.) Nomagugu, Joan Lulu, James Sipho and Douglas Sobanto.

Dube was also an educator, a speaker of note on the circuit engaging whites in lectures around the country. In 1901, he and his first wife, Nokutela Dube, founded the Zulu Christian Industrial School which is now the Ohlange High School at Ohlange, near Phoenix and EkuPhakameni. This was the first educational institution in South Africa to be founded by a black woman.

In 1935 he founded the Natal Bantu Teachers' Association (later the Natal African Teachers' Union /NATU); he gave lecturers by invitation and he was awarded a Doctorate by the University of South Africa as a result. His role as an educator has been less documented, but he held and proposed views on education and culture that were to be used in inimical ways by the Apartheid government when it came into power in 1948 and legislating the Bantu Education Act. Dube had identified the need to combine Western education with local customs and traditions, all grounded in broad African communal behaviour. His theories on education are found in both Ukuziphatha and Isita.

== Man of letters ==
He was among the pioneering men of letters who helped to establish Zulu literature. He was one of the first published Zulu authors, although the first published Zulu book was written by Magema Fuze, whose history of the Zulus, Abantu abamnyama lapo bavela ngakona (translated as The Black People and From Whence They Came), was published in 1922, having been written in the 1880s and early 1890s.

Dube's first published work was an essay in English on self-improvement and public decency that was published in 1910. The work that was to earn him the honorary doctorate of philosophy was the 1992 essay Umuntu Isita Sake Uqobo Lwake ("A man is his own worst enemy"; text in pre-1936 Zulu old orthography). He went on to publish, in 1930, a historical novella that has proven to be popular and influential in Zulu canon titled Insila kaShaka (Shaka's Body Servant).

He embarked on writing biographies of the Zulu royal family, especially that of King Dinizulu, making him the first biographer in African literature. There are numerous other works of less significant literary quality such as the 1910 essay "Ukuziphatha" ("On Behaviour").

In addition to his literary works, Dube and his wife founded the first Zulu/English newspaper, Ilanga laseNatali (The Sun of Natal), in 1903, a publication that in 2003 celebrated its centenary. Ilanga laseNatali is no longer independent since being bought by the then proto-political association Inkatha yeNkululelo yeSizwe in 1988, led by Mangosuthu Buthelezi, later to be known as a political party in post-apartheid South Africa called Inkatha Freedom Party (IFP).

Dube and his first wife, Nokutela Dube, are credited with popularizing the Enoch Sontonga song "Nkosi Sikelel' iAfrika". This later became a national anthem after Ohlange Institute's choir used it. They played it at the South African Native National Congress meeting in 1912. It was sung after the closing prayer and the ANC adopted it as its official closing anthem in 1925.

== Influenced by Booker T. Washington ==
Dube had experienced first-hand the influence of Booker T. Washington in his travels to the US to expand his education in early 1890. He and his wife founded the Ohlange High School in 1901, a school dedicated to teaching Bantu women modern ways to be liberated and find a place in modern society. In his Ukuziphatha Dube had identified the Bantu woman as the weakness in developing Bantu society because of the society's restrictions on education for women and what he identified as woman's propensity to ephemera. Dube was particularly influenced by reading Washington's Up From Slavery (1901), a book on self-reliance, the gospel that was taught by the American sage Ralph Waldo Emerson. Washington's book proved immensely influential in Bantu thought and across the black world. It was subsequently translated into several Bantu languages in South Africa, but Dube never chose to translate it, instead putting its teachings into practice. The Dubes met Washington in 1897 on a visit to the US.

Dube had been inspired by Washington's Tuskegee Institute; Dube's school is still functioning today. Dube was a firm believer in self-reliance, both as an ethical and spiritual quest towards realisation of dignity and respect in the eyes of others. In Isita, he preached self-reliance and the need for black people to initiate economic ventures to gain respect in the eyes of the world.

This putting of Washington’s ideas into action was never duplicated, except by Garvey and his movement and, on a minor scale, by the political figure Steve Biko in his hometown of King William's Town in the province of the Eastern Cape. Years later Garvey attempted to see Washington because of a similar inspiration, though he arrived in the US in 1916, Washington had died the previous year.

== Family ==
Nokutela and John Dube's organisation success was not matched in their marriage. Their failure to have children was seen to reflect badly on Nokutela and John fathered a child with one of their pupils. A committee was set up to investigate John, but they took no action and Nokutela felt humiliated. The couple separated in about 1914, and Nokutela moved to the Transvaal until she became ill with kidney disease. She returned to live with John Dube in Johannesburg, and died in 1917 at the age of 44. Her funeral was attended by Pixley ka Isaka Seme and other prominent members of what was to become the African National Congress.

In 1920, Dube married Angeline Khumalo and they went on to have six children.

== Legacy ==
He was posthumously awarded the Order of Luthuli in Gold.

The JL Dube Heritage Legacy Project, which upgrades and protects gravesites, is named in his honour.

The University of Kwazulu-Natal holds an annual John Langalibalele Dube Memorial Lecture.

== Publications ==
Dube’s publications include;

- The Zulu’s appeal for light, and England’s duty (1909)
- Amagama Abantu (A Zulu Song Book) (1911) with Nokutela Dube
- Isitha somuntu nguye uQobo lwake, U-Jege insila KaShaka (1931) (translated by Boxwell as ‘Jege the body-servant of Shaka’)
- Insila, the Eyes and Ears of the King (1931)
- Ushembe (1936)
- Ukaziphatha khale
