= Anthony Cope (Dean of Elphin) =

Irish Anglican priest (??–1705)

Anthony Cope was a seventeenth-century Irish Anglican priest.

Cope was educated at Trinity College, Dublin. He was Archdeacon of Elphin from 1669 to 1670; Prebendary of Killaraght in Achonry Cathedral from 1673 to 1693; Dean of Elphin from 1683 to 1700; and Prebendary of Rasharkin in Lisburn Cathedral from 1700 until his death in 1705.
