= Ohlange High School =

Secondary school in Durban, KwaZulu-Natal, South Africa

Coordinates: 29°41′54.63″S 30°57′26.21″E

- Inanda; Durban, KwaZulu-Natal, 4310; South Africa

Information
- School type: Secondary
- Religious affiliation: Christian
- Founded: 26 July 1901; 124 years ago
- Founders: John Dube and Nokutela Dube
- Chairperson: Mr Thandanani Njabulo Mabanga
- Principal: S. A. Nxumalo
- Teaching staff: 42 (2016)
- Employees: c. 60
- Enrollment: 1192 (2016)
- Classrooms: 24
- Colours: Black & white

UNESCO World Heritage Site
- Official name: Human Rights, Liberation and Reconciliation: Nelson Mandela Legacy Sites
- Designated: 2024 (46th session)
- Reference no.: 1676

Ohlange High School is a secondary school in Inanda, KwaZulu-Natal, South Africa. It was founded in 1901 by John Dube and Nokuthela Dube (née Mdima). It was the first school in South Africa started by a black person. John Dube was also the first President of what became the ANC. The school was chosen by President Nelson Mandela as the place where he would cast his vote in the first racially inclusive election in South Africa in 1994.

== History ==
The school was founded in 1901 as the Zulu Christian Industrial School by John Langalibalele Dube and his first wife, Nokutela. The school, also known as the Ohlange Native Industrial Institute, was the first educational institution in South Africa to be founded by a black person. The land for the school was donated by Chief Mqhawe of the AmaQadi. John Dube had been in contact with Booker T. Washington and modelled the school after the Tuskegee University in America. As a result, the Zulu Christian Industrial Institute laid emphasis on developing self-reliance in its students. In 1901, the school was renamed the Ohlange Institute. It was called "Ohlange" by Dube based on the word "uhlanga", which means the point of new growth in a plant or an ancestor for a descended family.

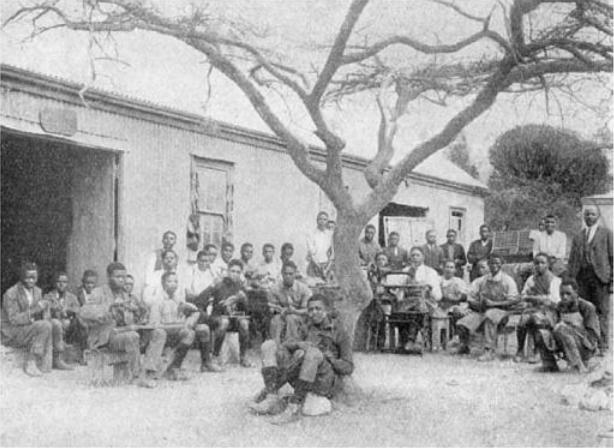
Ohlange shoemaking class John Dube on the right

The school was so popular initially that students were sleeping without beds. The finances were difficult in the first few years. A solution to this came from an American committee that supported Dube's belief that Christian conversion could be achieved via industrial education. A leading member of the committee was the Illinois pastor Sidney Dix Strong who had visited South Africa and had included the Ohlange Institute to his itinerary. Strong's wife died on the journey back to Chicago and Strong decided to use the Ohlange cause to distract himself from his loss.

Strong was able to arrange for the Dubes to meet Douglas and Emaroy June Smith, who became rich due to patent medicines and in time from the Pepsodent toothpaste brand. They donated thousands of dollars to the school, which enabled more teachers to be employed. This was in addition to the money that Dube obtained from the family of Anson Phelps Stokes.

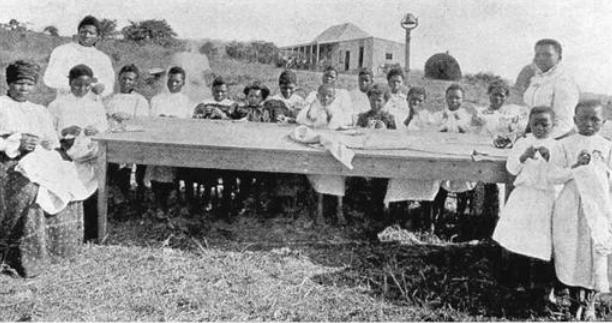
Mrs Dube and her early years needlework class.

By 1904, the finances needed further attention and Dube was unable to find any help in Natal. He had to return to America and he left John Mdima in charge of both the school and the newspaper. In Brooklyn, Dube met the new chair of the committee S. Parkes Cadman, who was pastor of the Central Congregational church in Brooklyn. Cadman reorganised the funding arranging for benefactors to sponsor students for £30 a year and arranging for Dube's helpers and family including John Mdima to go to college. The Dubes spent fifteen months in the states with John speaking and his wife singing. June Emaroy Smith was particularly generous and funded the 1907 construction of a boy's building. Dube noted in his talks that the Afro American was largely Christian whereas the native African had only limited access to the Christian message.

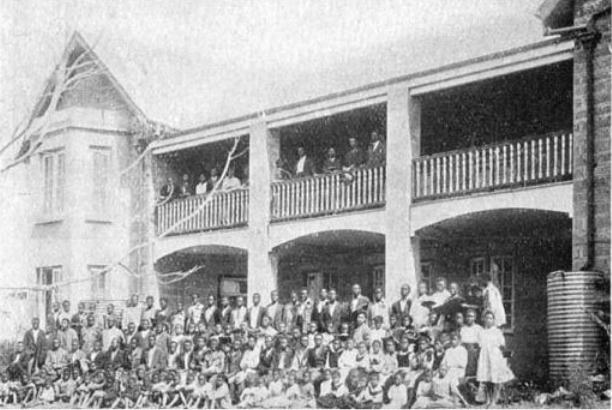
The 1917 Girls' building at Ohlange

In its early years the school taught not only basic education but also vocational skills such as journalism, shoe and dressmaking, carpentry, motor mechanics and agriculture. Dube contributed to the administration, as well as teaching journalism. The academic side was not ignored and in 1915 the first Ohlange students went to study at the University College of the Cape of Good Hope. 1917 saw the construction of a girls' dormitory. The purpose here was to establish a teacher training centre, which was seen as a female career.

Enoch Sontonga's song, which later became a South African national anthem, became better known after Ohlange Institute's choir used it. They played it at the South African Native National Congress meeting in 1912. It was sung after the closing prayer, and the ANC adopted it as its official closing anthem in 1925.

== Nelson Mandela's vote ==
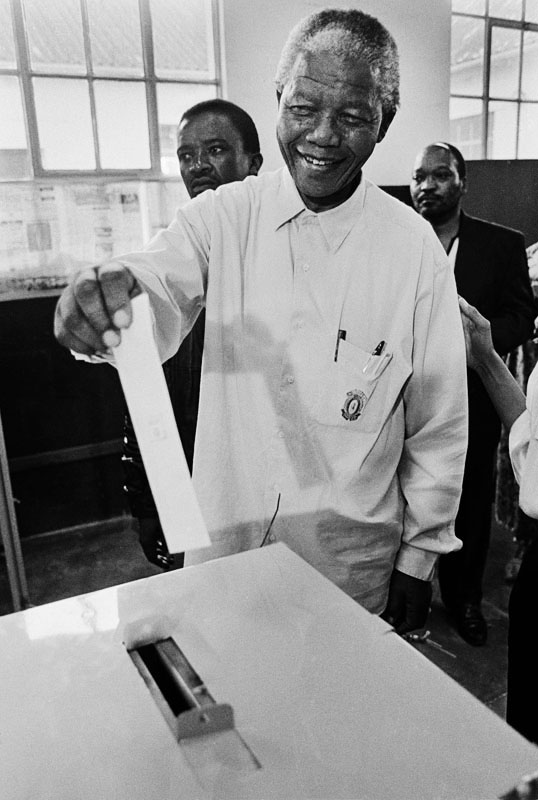
Nelson Mandela casting his first free vote at Ohlange

On 27 April 1994, Nelson Mandela cast his vote in his country's first all-race elections at a polling booth in the school. Mandela chose the area because he wanted to give the native black population the confidence to vote. He chose Ohlange School in particular because this is where John Dube, the first president of what was to become the ANC, was buried, and he wanted to lay a wreath. Mandela stood by the grave and said: "Mr President, I have come to report to you that South Africa is free today."

== Today ==
Enrolment in 2012 was 865, with nearly 100 boarding at the school. There were just over 60 staff, with 34 being teachers in 2012.

The school had a laboratory and a technical drawing room, a computer and cooking room, a library and 23 other classrooms in 2012. The admin block is in addition and the school had plans in 2012 to add six more classrooms and to increase the computing facilities.

In 2007, Ohlange was among several schools recognised as "historic schools". Funding of six million rand a year was earmarked for Ohlange, Adams College, Inkamana High School, Inanda Seminary and Vryheid Comprehensive High School to make them academies focusing on Maths, Science and Technology. Anglican Archbishop Emeritus Njongonkulu Ndungane said that they still needed funds and "little has been achieved since democracy".

== Alumni ==
Prominent former pupils include the Nobel Laureate Albert Luthuli, his wife Nokukhanya Bhengu, women's rights activist and clubwoman Cecilia Tshabalala, and the Deputy President Phumzile Mlambo-Ngcuka, who went back to her former school in May 2006 as part of the Global Campaign for Education. Musical alumni include Reuben Caluza, the singer Busi Mhlongo and the jazz musician Victor Ntoni. Sportsman Stephen Mokone also studied here. Judge President John Hlophe matriculated at Ohlange in 1978.
