= Harry Camp Lugg =

Harry Camp Lugg (9 May 1882 - November 1978) was Chief Commissioner for Native Affairs in Natal, South Africa.

== Early life and family ==
Harry Camp Lugg was born on 9 May 1882.

== Career ==
Lugg was Chief Commissioner for Native Affairs in Natal, South Africa.

== Death and legacy ==
Lugg died in November 1978.

A selection of his papers is held in the Campbell Collections of the University of KwaZulu-Natal.

== Selected publications ==
- Life Under a Zulu Shield
- Places of Interest in Natal and Zululand
- A Natal family looks back
- Historic Natal and Zululand, containing a series of short sketches of the historical spots
- Zulu FX20
- Zulu place names in Natal; a list of the more important mountains, rivers, estuaries and other places in Natal and Zululand with their Zulu names and meanings; also some personal names
- Agricultural ceremonies in Natal and Zululand
