= Adams College =

School near Amanzimtoti, South Africa

Coordinates: 30°01′52″S 30°49′04″E

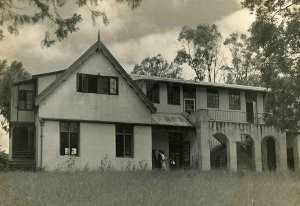
- Adams College before the 1947 fire
- Amanzimtoti; KwaZulu-Natal; South Africa

Information
- Motto: Arise and Shine
- Founded: 1853
- Founder: Rev. David Rood
- Chair: Mrs Mkhungo
- Principal: Mr Zulu

Adams College is a historic Christian mission school in South Africa, associated with the United Congregational Church of Southern Africa (UCCSA). It was founded in 1853 at Amanzimtoti a settlement just over 20 miles (32 km) south of Durban by an American missionary. The settlement there is known as Adams Mission. The college's alumni include Presidents of Botswana and Uganda, several ministers and leaders of the African National Congress. It is recognised as a historic school. It has been called Adams School, Amanzimtoti Institute and the Amanzimtoti Zulu Training School.

== History ==
The school was founded in 1853 by the Reverend David Rood, missionary of the American Board of Commissioners for Foreign Missions. The school was located on the glebe of the Amanzimtoti mission and was initially named the Amanzimtoti Institute. Rood had arrived in Natal 20 January 1848 and subsequently established the Ifafa mission station. Rood then transferred to Amanzimtoti following the 16 September 1851 death of mission founder the Reverend Newton Adams, M.D. Adams was much revered and in the 1930s the school was renamed Adams College in his honour.

Adams had arrived in 1835 with two other missionaries, but after being rebuffed by the Thabethe tribe which employed local chiefs from numerous nguni clans one noticeable one was headed by inkosi Mtubantuba to donate cattle they had set out to establish three complementary missions. Adams had chosen a site south of Durban where he founded a "family school" within months of his arrival. The school attracted both adults and children. He was helped by an early convert called Mbalasi who was the widow of Duze Ka Mnengwa KaKhondlo. He had been a Chief of the Makanya killed during the wars with Shaka leaving Mbalasi to care for herself. She and her son Nembula became part of the Adams home.

A historic meeting took place here in 1881 when the Reverend William Cullen Wilcox was asked to talk to a fatherless student called John Dube about his poor behavior at the school. John was the son of the Reverend James Dube who was the Congregational minister in Inanda. In 1887 John Dube was "adopted" by the Wilcoxes and taken to America to study at Oberlin College. Wilcox was to be eventually awarded with a medal by the South African government and Dube was to open his own school, his own newspaper and to be the first leader of what was to become the African National Congress.

In 1888 Dr. John Mavuma Nembula, a student from Adams, returned to the College from America. He had been sent to America to help with translating a Zulu Bible but he had stayed there and he had become a physician. He was the first Black South African to do this and for a while taught physiology at the college.

In 1924 Z.K. Matthews was appointed to be the first black head of Adams College where the activist Albert Luthuli was already a teacher. Both of them were active in politics and Matthews was later to be the Botswana Ambassador to the United Nations and Luthuli was to win the Nobel Peace Prize.

Between 1933 and 1945 Edgar Brookes was the Principal of Adams College. He worked closely with John Dube of Ohlange High School to achieve common objectives of improving the lot of native Africans. The school became one of the most important schools for black education.

In 1945 the school lost Edgar Brookes, and there was a period of unrest and poor discipline. In 1947 the main building of the school burned down. A new headmaster, Jack Grant, a white academic, arrived from Trinidad in 1948 to refocus the school. The school faced legal opposition from the government as the Bantu Education Act came into force. This act required that South African schools prepare black students for secondary and manual labour. Grant and the school felt that this was unacceptable and argued that they should be allowed to become independent. However the first President and the incumbent President of the ANC were staff from the school and the authorities were adamant. They allowed the nearby Inanda Seminary School to operate outside the act, but in 1956 the school held a service to mark the end of its operation. The school was sold to the government and the head left South Africa. The important item was the school was not able to be called "Adams". What was then thought to be the end of a leading school was described by ex-staff member George C. Grant in his book, The Liquidation of Adams College.

The school was renamed the Amanzimtoti Zulu Training School as the Bantu Education Act, 1953 finally came into effect. Bantu Education was a clearly divisive and paternalist racist campaign that was designed to educate black children for their lowly place in society. Academic subjects were not encouraged as this might deny the country the (black) manual labour it required. The school's name returned to "Adams" when Bantu education was abandoned.

During this period the school was poorly cared for during the Apartheid period and buildings were demolished. The school requires some work to achieve its previous successes but in 2007 the school achieved a 93% Matric pass rate in line with Thulani Khumalo the heads priority of "academic excellence".

== Music ==
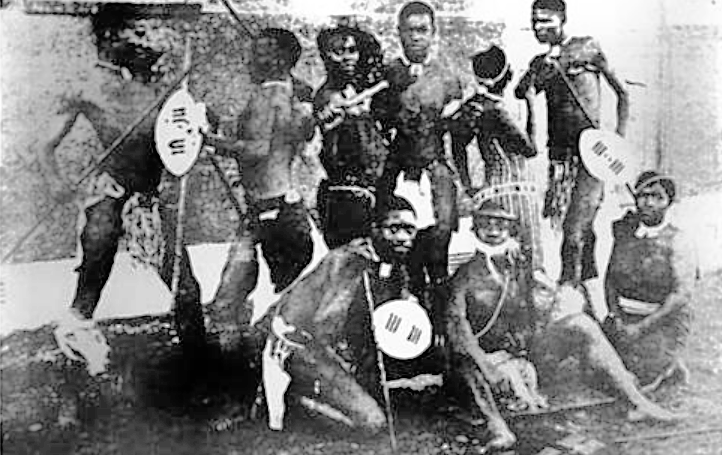
The Lucky Stars

Both what is now Ohlange High School and Adams were involved with a move to return music to its ethnic roots. The move to a traditionalist approach was backed by John Dube who was at Ohlange and Brookes who was the headmaster here. Esau Fika Mthethwea who was a teacher formed the "Lucky Stars" in 1929 as an ethnic vaudeville troupe of typically eight young teachers who had been trained at Adams. Esau died in 1933 but others took over and the Lucky Stars toured throughout the country and they nearly had a tour of Europe.

== Sport ==
The "Shooting Stars" are one of the oldest football teams in the Durban area. Football was introduced by the missionary schools and the Shooting Stars were able to challenge similar teams at Ifafa, Umbumbulu and Inanda. All of these teams were well established by 1902.

George Copeland Grant was on the teaching staff of Adams College where cricket had been introduced in the 1930s. As "Jackie" Grant he had captained the West Indies Cricket team for four tests before becoming a missionary teacher in 1939. When Grant arrived Ohlange High School already had an established team. Grant raised the status of the game around Durban and made Adams the centre of this new school sport. Cricket was the sport popular with the Indian immigrants to South Africa and the local Durban Indian Cricket Union dated from 1894.

== Today ==
The mission station is called Adams Mission and it had a population of 600 in 2001.

In 2007 Adams College was amongst several schools recognised as "historic schools". Funding of six million rand a year was earmarked for Adams, Ohlange High School, Inkamana High School, Inanda Seminary School and Vryheid Comprehensive High School to make them academies focussing on Maths, Science and Technology. Anglican Archbishop Emeritus Njongonkulu Ndungane said that they still needed funds and "little has been achieved since democracy".

In July 2016 President Jacob Zuma turned the sod on a project to revitalise the school, which was backed by the Adams College Development Trust, and in September 2017 he returned to open newly built classrooms and a library. After the school marked its 170th anniversary in 2023, the KwaZulu-Natal Department of Education began a further infrastructure upgrade in February 2024 that included new fencing and moving the sports fields and change rooms.

== Alumni ==
- Mangosuthu Buthelezi - Prime Minister and political leader
- Herbert Chitepo - Chairman of the Zimbabwe African National Union
- Herbert Isaac Ernest Dhlomo - writer and poet
- Nkosazana Dlamini-Zuma - South African cabinet minister
- John Dube - First ANC president and founder member
- Enoch Dumbutshena - first Zimbabwean Chief Justice; African descent
- Pixley ka Isaka Seme - ANC founder
- Seretse Khama - President of Botswana
- Ellen Kuzwayo - President of the ANC Youth League
- Pius Langa - South African Chief Justice
- Anton Lembede - First president of the ANC Youth League
- Albert Lutuli - leader of the ANC and Nobel Laureate
- Todd Matshikiza - jazz composer
- Epainette Mbeki - mother of former president Thabo Mbeki of South Africa
- Zephania Mothopeng - President of the Pan-Africanist Congress
- Oscar Mpetha
- Es'kia Mphahlele (1919–2008) - writer and teacher
- Thomas Nkobi - ANC Treasurer General 1973–1994
- Joshua Nkomo - Vice-President of Zimbabwe
- Milton Obote - president of Uganda
- Stanlake J. W. T. Samkange - educationalist, author, historian
- Stella Sigcau - South African cabinet minister

== Notable staff ==
- Nokukhanya Bhengu - anti-apartheid activist
- Edgar Brookes - transformed the school and was an ambassador to the United Nations
- George Copeland "Jackie" Grant - West Indies bowler and cricket captain
- John Dube - started his own school and newspaper
- Albert Lutuli - Nobel Peace Prize winner
- Z.K. Matthews - headmaster; became the Ambassador to the United States for Botswana
- Reuben Tholakele Guluza - former South African author, musician and educator
