= Inanda, KwaZulu-Natal =

Inanda eNanda
- Location within KwaZulu-Natal Location within South Africa
- Coordinates: 29°41′S 30°56′E
- Country: South Africa
- Province: KwaZulu-Natal
- Municipality: eThekwini

Area
  - Total: 26.81 km^{2} (10.35 sq mi)

Population (2025)
  - Total: 202,814
  - Density: 7,565/km^{2} (19,590/sq mi)

Racial makeup (2015)
  - Black African: 99.4%
  - Coloured: 0.2%
  - Indian/Asian: 0.2%
  - White: 0.01%
  - Other: 0.2%

First languages (2011)
  - Zulu: 89%
  - Xhosa: 4.5%
  - English: 2.4%
  - S. Ndebele: 1%
  - Other: 3.1%
- Time zone: UTC+2 (SAST)
- Postal code (street): 4310
- PO box: 4309
- Area code: 031
- Website: http://inanda.co.za/

Inanda or eNanda (isiZulu: pleasant place, also possibly, level-topped hill) is a township in Durban KwaZulu-Natal, South Africa that is situated 21 km north-west of Durban. It forms part of eThekwini, the Greater Durban Metropolitan Municipality. Populated primarily by Zulu-speaking Black Africans, Inanda is the home of John Langalibalele Dube, first President of the African National Congress (ANC), a former residence and base of operations of Mahatma Gandhi, and the birthplace of the syncretic Nazareth Baptist Church

== History ==
Inanda Township, situated within the eThekwini Metropolitan Municipality, holds historical significance as one of the original townships in the region. Initially, during the 17th century, it served as a vital oasis for local Indigenous farmers. The landscape transformed with the arrival of white settlers in the late 1700s, and by the 1800s, Inanda Township became designated as a 'Reserve' for Black and less educated individuals. Indian farmers became part of the community in 1936, further enriching its cultural fabric.

The year 1951 marked a pivotal shift with the introduction of the Group Areas Act by the government. This legislation led to an influx of Black residents into Inanda Township, accompanied by challenges arising from inadequate infrastructure encompassing housing, schools, clinics, roads, sanitation, and water systems. The lack of proper planning detrimentally impacted the quality of life for the township's inhabitants.

Tensions escalated between the Indian and African communities between 1984-1987, resulting in significant political and racial clashes. As a consequence, many Indian residents relocated to nearby areas such as Verulam and Phoenix. Despite South Africa's first democratic elections in 1994, Inanda Township continued to experience relative neglect from the eThekwini Metropolitan Municipality in terms of developmental initiatives.

Notably, on April 27, 1994, Inanda Township gained recognition as the location where Nelson Mandela cast his vote, marking a momentous occasion in the country's history. This event coincided with his election as the first Black President of the Republic later that same year.

=== Mafukuzela ===
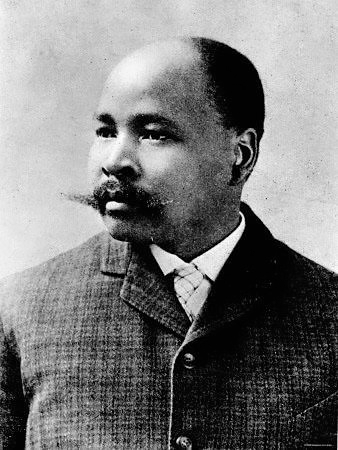
John Langalibalele Dube (11 February 1871 – 11 February 1946) was a South African essayist, philosopher, educator, politician, publisher, editor, novelist and poet.

John Langalibalele Dube, affectionately known as "Mafukuzela," alongside his wife Nokutela Dube, were born in the 1870s at an American-operated Christian mission station located in Inanda. As the son of a respected Zulu clergyman, Dube received his education at Oberlin College in the United States. Upon his return to his birthplace of Inanda, Dube embarked on a path of intellectual exploration, composing a series of insightful essays concerning the history and advancement of Africans. In 1903, he made a significant contribution to media by establishing the inaugural bilingual Zulu/English newspaper, titled Ilanga laseNatali (The Sun of Natal).

He assumed the role of the first president of the South African Native National Congress, from 1912 to 1917. This organization later evolved into the influential African National Congress. Inspired by the work of African-American educator Booker T. Washington and his Tuskegee University, Dube and his wife founded several schools in Inanda, including Ohlange High School, Redfern Primary School, and Langalibalele High Primary School. Dube's home neighborhood in Inanda, Dube Village, now contains numerous memorials to his efforts.

=== Gandhi and the Phoenix Settlement ===
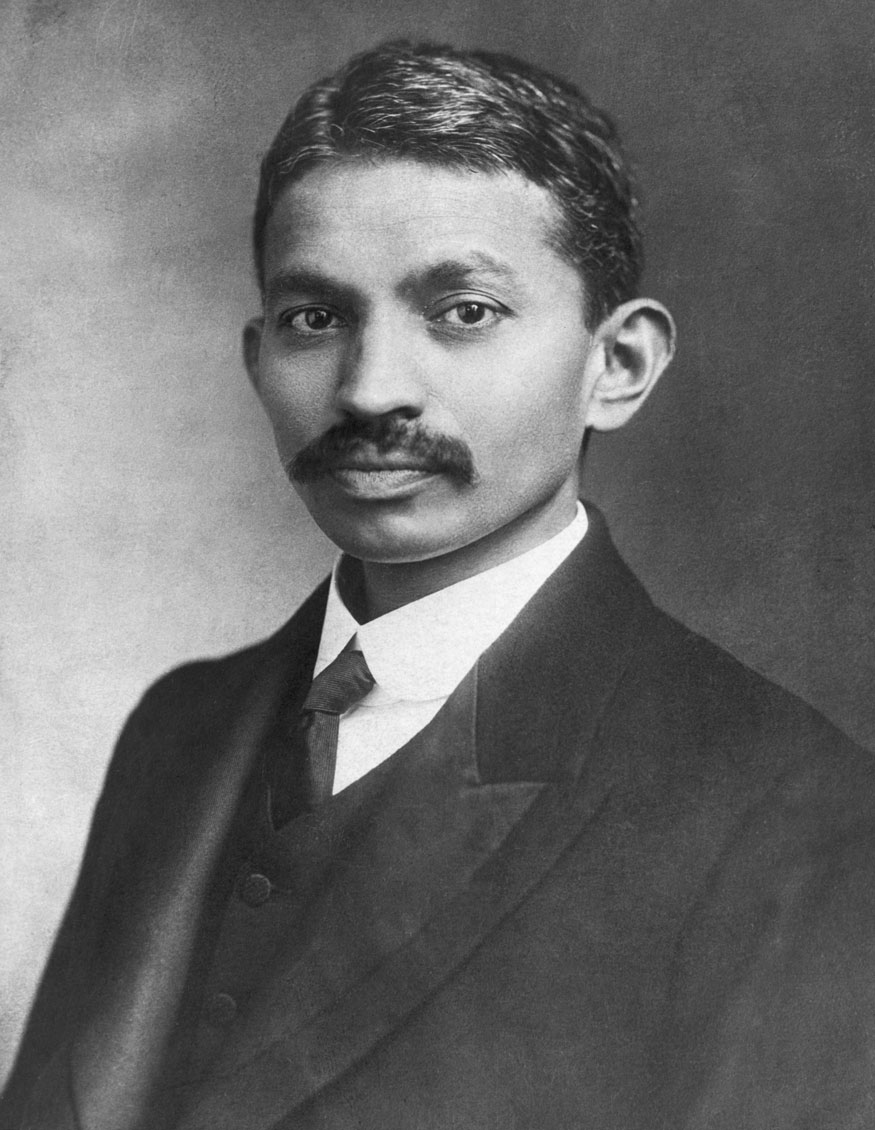
Mohandas K. Gandhi in South Africa, 1906.

In the year 1903, Mahatma Gandhi, who had established his residence in the nearby city of Durban in 1893, founded a modest settlement known as Phoenix Settlement on the northwestern periphery of Inanda. This village-like community featured residences, a clinic, a school, and a printing press, and played a pivotal role as a dwelling place for Gandhi, his family, and his supporters. Their collective mission was to advocate for societal transformation through nonviolent resistance. The influential newspaper Indian Opinion, which vigorously championed the civil rights of both Indian South Africans and native Africans, was published from this site in four different languages.

Even after Gandhi's departure in 1914, Phoenix Settlement continued to be a home for various residents and activists, including his son, Manilal Gandhi. As the 1980s unfolded, the vicinity of the Settlement witnessed the emergence of a squatter camp named Bhambayi, which eventually encompassed much of the area. The year 1985 witnessed riots within the camp, driven by opposition to apartheid policies, resulting in significant damage to the structures of Phoenix Settlement. Subsequently, the community largely fell into disuse until February 2000, when then-President Thabo Mbeki formally committed to its reestablishment and restoration. This commitment materialized within the same year, leading to the successful restoration of Phoenix Settlement.

Phoenix Settlement was declared a National Heritage Site by the South African government in 2020.

=== Nazareth Baptist Church ===
In the early 20th century, Isaiah Shembe, a prominent Zulu mystic and charismatic preacher, established the Nazareth Baptist Church in Inanda. This African initiated church elements of Christianity with indigenous Zulu traditions. Central to the church's teachings are principles of abstemious living and adherence to the Ten Commandments. The followers of this faith, commonly referred to as "Shembe," quasi-messianic attributes to Isaiah Shembe and his descendants. Over the course of more than a century since its inception, the Church has experienced multiple divisions. The majority of Shembe adherents continue to originate from the KwaZulu-Natal region, and the revered historical site of the Inanda church headquarters, known as ekuPhakameni, remains in active use.

=== Racial Conflict ===
During the period spanning from 1978 to 1994, Inanda witnessed a series of intense confrontations between its African and Indian communities, leading to significant upheaval. A notable outcome of these events was the relocation of a substantial portion of the town's Indian populace to the neighboring areas of Phoenix and Verulam.

== Geography ==
Adjacent communities within the KwaZulu-Natal province, including the prominent city of Durban, encompass KwaMashu and Ntuzuma. Inanda Township occupies an extensive geographical area and is segmented into multiple sections. Unlike neighboring KwaMashu, these divisions are denoted by actual names rather than letters. Among these sections are Inanda Newtowns A, B, and C (locally referred to as Ematendeni), Dube Village, Ezimangweni, White City, Langalibalele, Ohlange, Amaoti, Lindley, Congo (D.R), Amatikwe, Phola, Ngoqokazi, Tafuleni, Ntanda, Emachobeni, Ngcungcwini, Soweto, and Glebe. Although there exists ongoing discourse concerning whether the area extending from Umzinyathi to Manyaseni falls within Inanda's boundaries, it is situated within the Qadi Area. However, the Qadi Area lacks official standalone recognition, necessitating its residents to employ Inanda for postal addresses and commercial purposes. Notably, the Inanda section of Ohlange has evolved into a notable tourist destination due to its significant historical association with the esteemed late Dr. John Langalibalele Dube.

== Economy and infrastructure ==
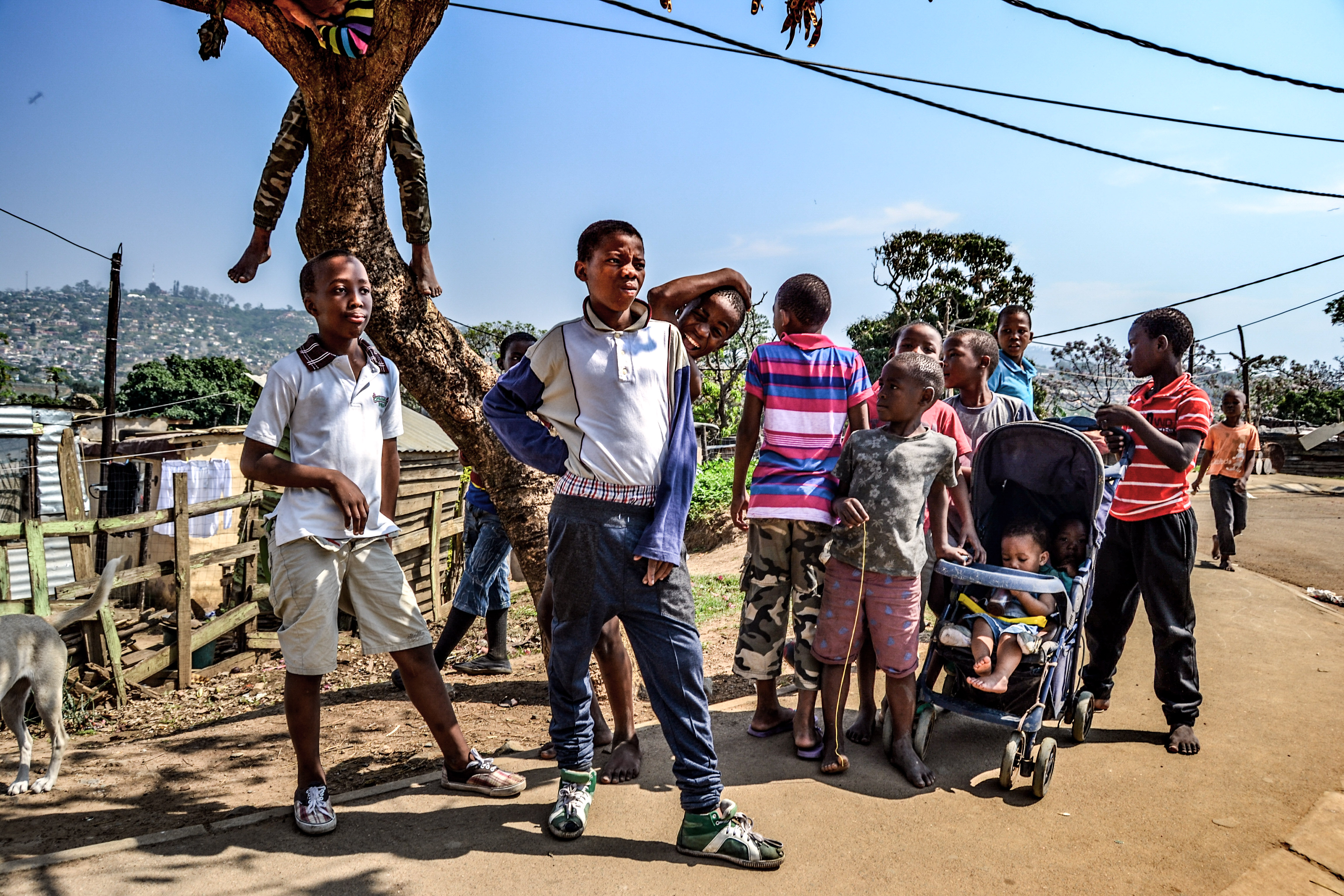
Children in Inanda

In the realm of economics, Inanda Township exhibits a range of features. To the northern extent of the township lies Inanda North Town Centre, colloquially referred to as eMtshebheni by locals. This hub encompasses various establishments including well-known stores. Adjacent to this commercial zone is the Inanda SAPS Station.

On the southern fringes of the township stands the Dube Village Mall, a tribute to the late Dr. John Langalibalele Dube. Within this mall, one finds amenities such as the Inanda Post Office and a variety of other stores.

Turning to infrastructure, the township has several community health centers catering to residents' healthcare needs. Notable among these are the Inanda CHC Clinic on Umshado Road, Newtown C, as well as the Inanda Newtown A & B Clinics, Sivananda Clinic in Ohlange, St. Joseph's Roman Clinic in Amatikwe, and Bhekimpilo Clinic in Amatikwe, among others. The Abalindi Old Age & Orphanage Home is located in Amatikwe.

Additionally, the township offers various recreational facilities, including sporting fields with the Dr. JL Dube Stadium being a prominent landmark. These are complemented by children's parks and innovative Fitness Parks introduced by the eThekwini Metropolitan Municipality, aimed at promoting a healthy lifestyle within the township. Notably, the Tafuleni Cemetery Park in the Tafuleni Section holds significance as one of the largest cemetery parks within the eThekwini Metropolitan area.

== Education ==
- Ohlange High School — situated in the Inanda district, holds historical significance as an educational institution founded by Dr. John Langalibalele Dube and his wife, Nokutela Dube, as Zulu Christian Industrial School. Notably, it gained distinction as the polling venue where Nelson Mandela cast his vote in South Africa's first racially integrated national election during South Africa's inaugural post-apartheid elections in 1994. This pivotal event marked a significant milestone in the nation's democratic transition. Presently, Ohlange High School maintains its dual role as a daily functioning secondary school, providing education to students, while also serving as a designated polling station for provincial and national elections.
- Inanda Seminary School — established in 1869, is an independent girls' secondary school. Founded by Daniel and Lucy Lindley under the auspices of the American Board of Commissioners for Foreign Missions, the institution ranks among the oldest educational establishments in South Africa. It holds the position of being the second oldest school in Durban, succeeding only the Durban High School.
- Langalibalele High Primary School — Langelibalele High Primary School, situated in the Inanda region, owes its establishment and nomenclature to tDr. John Langalibalele Dube, a prominent figure in the community, the school bears the name of its founder.
- JG Zuma High School — The institution, named after former President Jacob Zuma, was established to honor his contributions and legacy. The decision to name the school after President Zuma reflects a desire to recognize his role in the nation's history and his impact on the broader societal landscape.
- Redfern Primary School — Despite its geographical location in Phoenix, which is closely connected to Inanda through the Mahatma Gandhi Settlements, Redfern Primary's origins trace back to its founding by Dr. John Langalibalele Dube.
- Inanda Newtown Comprehensive School
- Amandlakayise Primary School — also founded by Dr. John Langalibalele Dube.
- No-7 High School, Intshisekelo High School, Nkosinathi High School, Emachobeni Secondary School, Sithandimfundo High School, Mvaba High School, Mqhawe High School and Sithabile High School are other notable schools located in Inanda.

There is also the Elangeni FET College, located in Ohlange along Dr. Langalibalele Dube Drive, stands as a tertiary educational institution. The college is dedicated to providing courses encompassing Business and Engineering qualifications among its offerings.

== Media ==
Inanda serves as the central hub for the bilingual (English/Zulu) radio station, Inanda FM], which airs across the entirety of KwaZulu-Natal. It broadcast in both English and Zulu. As of November 2010, The station boasts an audience of more than 102,000.

Additionally, it holds historical significance as the birthplace of the Ilanga laseNatal, an esteemed newsletter publication founded by John Langalibalele Dube.

== Notable people ==
- John Langalibalele Dube made notable contributions as an educator, politician, publisher, editor, novelist, and poet. He holds credit as the founder of Ilanga lase Natal and as a co-founder of both the Inanda Seminary School and Ohlange High School. Furthermore, he played a significant role as the inaugural president of the South African Native National Congress (SANNC), a pivotal organization that would later evolve into the African National Congress.
- Nokutela Dube, the first South African woman to establish a school. She also played a role as a co-founder in initiatives such as the Ilanga lase Natal newspaper, the Ohlange Institute, and the Natal Native Congress, which eventually served as a precursor to the establishment of the South African Native National Congress. She was also the wife of John Langalibalele Dube.
- Ndaba Mhlongo, renowned for his contributions to the entertainment industry, as an actor and comedian. He held a significant personal connection as the husband of actress Mary Twala, while also being a sibling to the musician Busi Mhlongo. Within his familial sphere, he held the role of a father to actor, television personality, and choreographer Somizi Mhlongo.
- Busi Mhlongo, distinguished for her talents in the realm of music, dance, and composition, she made her mark as a singer, dancer, and composer. Notably, she is the sister of comedian Ndaba Mhlongo and holds the role of aunt to television personality Somizi Mhlongo.
- Mxolisi Kaunda, a figure in the realm of politics, he holds the position of Mayor within the eThekwini Metropolitan Municipality.
- Bertha Mkhize, recognized for her multifaceted contributions, she embodied roles as a teacher, businesswoman, advocate for women's rights, and a dedicated participant in the anti-apartheid movement. Her origins trace back to Embo, Umkomaas, and she received her education at the esteemed Inanda Seminary School and Ohlange High School. Throughout her life, she predominantly resided in the community of Inanda.
- Zandile Gumede, a notable South African figure, she has held the position of a Member of the KwaZulu-Natal Provincial Legislature since 2020. Prior to this, she assumed the role of Executive Mayor within the eThekwini Metropolitan Municipality, serving diligently from 2016 to 2019.
- Makoti Khawula, an influential advocate against apartheid and a dedicated participant in the anti-apartheid movement, she also holds the distinction of being a Member of the National Assembly of South Africa, representing the Economic Freedom Fighters party.
- Ted Swales, hailing as a British-South African fighter pilot and a World War II veteran, he earned recognition for his courageous actions in the defense of his nation. His achievements led to the awarding of the Distinguished Flying Cross, and he was posthumously bestowed with the Victoria Cross in his honor.
- Sibusiso Khumalo, an accomplished South African professional footballer, he occupies the role of a defender within the ranks of Black Leopards in the Premier Soccer League. Furthermore, he contributes his skills to the South African men's national team.
- Andile Fikizolo, also known as Carot, is a South African soccer player who plays as a midfielder and right wing for Golden Arrows in the Premier Soccer League
