= Josiah Tshangana Gumede =

South African politician

Josiah Tshangana Gumede (also J.T. Gumede) (9 October 1867 – 6 November 1946) was a South African politician and father of Archie Gumede. He was born in Healdtown village, Fort Beaufort in the present-day Eastern Cape.

In all probability, he began his elementary schooling at the famous Healdtown Wesleyan Mission School. After completing his elementary schooling, he went on to attend the Native Institute at Grahamstown either in 1882/83 where he trained to become a teacher. He started his teaching career in Somerset East in the Eastern Cape.

Through a strange combination of events, Gumede and Martin Luthuli befriended Dinuzulu kaCetshwayo, the young Zulu king. As an iNduna (headman) he became intimately involved in the land struggles of Dinuzulu. He personally witnessed the attempts of the Boers to secure parts of Zululand for farming. House of Records, London, Lloyd George papers, Series F?Box 227/Folder 2, Gumede to the Right Honourable Lloyd George, 1 December 1919. Before the British annexation of Zululand, Gumede departed for Bergville when he turned to farming. In 1893 he toured England as a member of the Zulu Choir, founded by Saul Msane and the Reverend William August Illing, a German-trained Lutheran missionary who after 1869 renounced his Lutheran faith and became a convert of the Anglican Church. The Zulu Choir experienced blatant racial prejudice in England.

He was a founding member of two important African organisations in colonial Natal, Funamalungelo and the Natal Native Congress, although he did not attend the inaugural meeting of the Natal Native Congress in June 1900. He was serving as head of the Sotho Scouts during the Anglo Boer War of 1899–1902. His testimony before the South African Native Affairs, the so-called Lagden Commission of 1904 revealed his admiration of Zulu culture. In 1906 Gumede was one of the delegates, together with Kgosi Lesesa Tenki Tsotetsi of Batlokwa and Kgosi Moloi of Makgolokwe to England to protest against the Batlokwa and the Makgolokwe people losing their ancestral lands in the former Boer republics.Gumede was also the one who interpreted English and Sesotho to the governor as he was highly trusted by Makgolokwe and Batlokwa even though they did not get what they expected. Makgolokwe and Batlokwa not only lost 7,000 cattle but also lost £2,000, which was the cost for the case over their land. In England, a Trinidadian-born barrister, Henry Sylvester Williams, had undertaken care of the delegates. The other person noted as having the Tlokwa's interests placed in his hands was Dr. Evans Darby, the secretary of the League of Universal Brotherhood (LUB) South Africa 12 January 1907, p. 122. On his return with the Tlokwa and Kgolokwe chiefs to South Africa on 13 May 1907, Josiah was arrested for having left the country without obtaining the necessary permission. The report of this by Reuters was carried in the Manchester Guardian and The Times (p. 5) on 5 May.

Gumede's political consciousness had reached new heights before the establishment of the white Union of South Africa. Aware of the excitement among whites before the opening session of the South African National Convention, Gumede raised concerns about the position of Africans under Union. Gumede was a founding member of the South African Native National Congress in January 1912. In 1913 he voiced his criticism of the historic Native Land Act, which effectively limited Africans' access to only 7% of the country. In 1927, he was chosen as president of the ANC and served for three years. He was a delegate to the League against Imperialism in Brussels. Having become sympathetic to Communists after a visit to the Soviet Union, Gumede was ousted from the ANC in 1930.
