= Ilanga lase Natal =

First Zulu/English newspaper

Ilanga lase Natal (The Natal Sun or Sun of Natal) is a Zulu-language newspaper, published in KwaZulu-Natal, South Africa. It was the first ever newspaper to be published in the language. It was co-founded in 1903 by John Langalibalele Dube. Among its contributors was Magema Magwaza Fuze. It is owned by the investment arm of the Inkatha Freedom Party.
