= Dutch Reformed Church, Winburg =

Church in Winburg, South Africa

Dutch Reformed Church
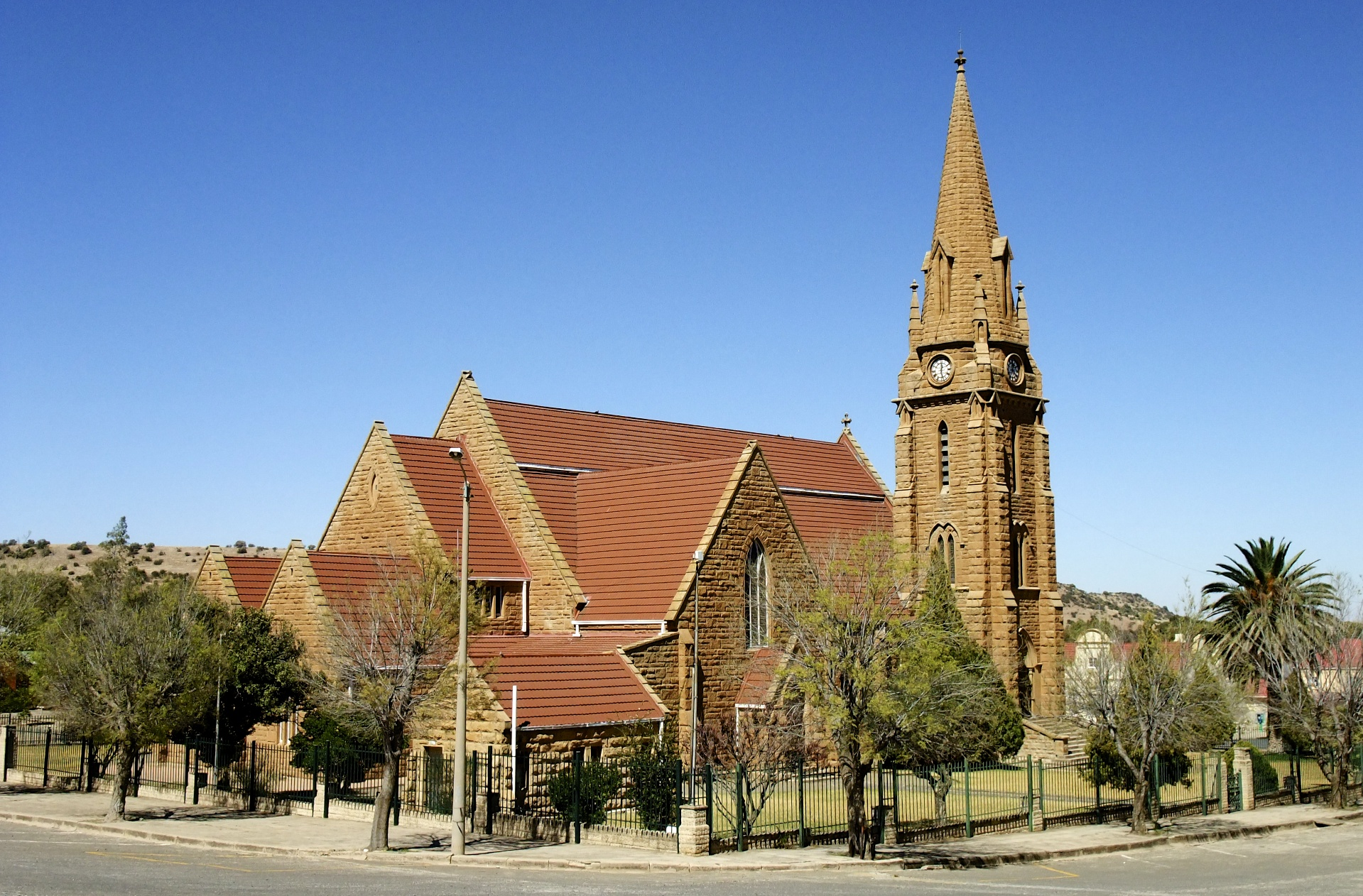
- Dutch Reformed Church
- Location: Winburg
- Country: South Africa
- Denomination: Nederduits Gereformeerde Kerk

History
- Founded: 1841

Architecture
- Functional status: Church

The Dutch Reformed Church in Winburg is the oldest congregation in the Free State Synod of the Dutch Reformed Church as well as the oldest in the entire Free State or former Transvaal.

== Background ==
In 1840, the first Voortrekker state was established in Potchefstroom by an agreement between Hendrik Potgieter and Andries Pretorius, which was called the Republic of Natalia and included the Transvaal, Northern Free State and Natal. Then the Voortrekker church was also established, which included the congregations of Potchefstroom, Winburg and Pietermaritzburg. The first church councils for the congregations were appointed by the Volksraad on 16 January 1841 and the Presbyterian missionary from America, Rev. Daniel Lindley, was appointed as the first pastor of this Voortrekker church.

Rev. Lindley lived in Natal and in March 1842 on his way to Potchefstroom also visited Winburg, confirmed the first church council members, held services in the various wards of this expanded congregation and administered the sacraments. Here, the baptism and membership registers of the congregation also began. On this first visit, Rev. Lindley baptized 331 children here.

== Ministers ==
- Hermanus van Broekhuizen, 1861–1866 (left for Holland; from 1882 until his death on 23 October 1894 pastor of Ficksburg
- Petrus Arnoldus Conradus van Heiningen, 1867–1893 (emeritus; died in 1907)
- Willem Hendrik Boshoff, 1906 – 12 April 1918 (died in office)
- Stephanus Jacobus Botha, 1948–1962
- Frederik Johannes van der Merwe, 1962–1976 (accepts his emeritus position)
