= Pietermaritzburg Reformed Church (NGK) =

The Pietermaritzburg Reformed Church was a congregation of the Dutch Reformed Church in South Africa (NGK) in Pietermaritzburg, the capital of KwaZulu-Natal, but after the sale of the congregation’s downtown building, its centre shifted to what is now Howick. It was the first congregation founded by Voortrekkers after they left Cape Colony and the 25th oldest congregation in the NGK. The congregation’s membership, however, declined by around two-thirds, from 752 in 2000 to 256 in 2015.

== Background ==
The Voortrekkers failed to recruit a pastor from Cape Colony, ultimately hiring Rev. Erasmus Smit, a missionary with the London Missionary Society, who was rejected by many worshipers due to his not having been ordained as such. In March 1837, he started the first baptismal register on the Modder River near Blesberg, which he termed the “Baptismal Register of the Reformed Church Traveling through South West Africa.” After a failed interview with another candidate on April 23, “Governor” Piet Retief named Rev. Smit the “first pastor for the itinerant congregation of the Reformed Church near Port Natal” on May 21, on the north shore of the Vet River. This allowed him to baptize children, confirm members, and bless marriages. During November, they crossed the Drakensberg, and therefore the following events in Rev. Smit’s diary took place on Natal soil.

On December 3, he suggested four members for the church council. On the 10th, the first child was born to Afrikaners in the territory of Dingane kaSenzangakhona, the same day the council’s first meeting was held in the presence of the Governor as commissioner. In the last quarter of the “mourning year,” October 28, 1838, the first communion service on the Great Trek was held. Living in large fortified camps to fend off Zulu Kingdom attacks, the Voortrekkers were able to attend Rev. Smit’s services in large numbers. On December 9, the Day of the Vow, Andries Pretorius and his league set out to war evoking the biblical tale of Gideon, defeating Dingane at the Battle of Blood River on the 16th. The Trek continued on to its final destination.

On October 23, 1838, the Trekker council had already decided to “settle on the first suitable place for a town” and founded Pietermaritzburg (named after the leaders Retief and Gerrit Maritz) on Kolonie Farm, the estate of Retief’s son-in-law commandant Piet Greyling. There was already a significant population there by the time Rev. Smit’s group arrived on January 31, 1839. Zulu forces were still raiding the area, but Rev. Smit began setting out a place of worship. The first church inside the camp was quite primitive and was labelled in Susanna Smit’s diary as the “Rietkerk” with a pulpit donated by two local benefactors.

On May 13, 1839, Pretorius, now the Secretary of the Volksraad, wrote to the pastors of the Cape Town Reformed Church (NGK), Stellenbosch Reformed Church (NGK), Paarl Reformed Church (NGK), and the Wynberg Reformed Church that the congregation wanted to build a proper church building and needed a pastor. On June 15 of that year, advisor C.J. Brand replied that he was setting up a donor list “for contributions to the building of the temple which you have promised to the Lord” (from the words of the Vow). On April 28, 1840, construction began on what would later be called the Covenant Church or Voortrekker Church, home to what would also be known as the Voortrekker Congregation.

== First pastor ==
The American missionary Daniel Lindley was finally appointed as pastor to the Voortrekkers on April 1, 1841. His remit stretched from Port Natal (now Durban) over the Drakensberg to Winburg and Potchefstroom. The Rev. Lindley repeatedly urged that a pastor from Holland be recruited so that he could return to the mission, and he seized his chance to resign when Rev. A.C. Stucki agreed to come to Natal. Since the Rev. Stucki unfortunately died at sea en route from Cape Town to Durban, leaving Rev. Jacob Ludwig Döhne of the Berlin Missionary Society to serve from March 1847 to 1849.

== First Afrikaner pastor ==
The congregation’s first Afrikaner pastor, Rev. Hendrik Emmanuel Faure, arrived at the end of 1852, and within two years the council decided to build a new church. After failed attempts to purchase a portion of the market square, the congregation decided to build alongside the plot where the Covenant Church lay.

== First church building in Natal ==
The first church building in the Voortrekker lands was built in Pietermaritzburg as a result of Sarel Cilliers’s victory at Blood River on December 16, 1838. That structure was, according to the 1949 report by the Pietermaritzburg council and Rev. C.W.I. Pistorius (1946-1948), not the first church but simply a placeholder until funds were raised to build the true Covenant Church. The makeshift place of worship was to be converted into a parsonage. However, after the British annexation of Natal and the subsequent exodus of Voortrekkers from there, the conversion plan never came to fruition. The church council wanted to build it on 33 Longmarket Street (now Langalibalele St), which the Volksraad had originally set aside for the Covenant Church.

While the congregation raised money and gathered building materials, they needed temporary worship space. At the time, Pietermaritzburg was nothing but a set of small hartebeest stables, one of which was used for the purpose. On May 13, 1839, Jacobus Burger, Johannes Stephanus Maritz, and Pretorius wrote the four pastors of Cape Colony (Revs. Abraham Faure, Tobias Johannes Herold, Gottlieb Wilhelm Anthonie van der Lingen, and Philip Eduard Faure) asking the latter to “draw up donor lists for the sake of the God of all Gods but for whose wondrous providence we would all have perished.”

Some Voortrekkers could contribute, but most were destitute and had little to spare. Several English-speaking residents of Pietermaritzburg donated a pound each, but Burger, Maritz, and Pretorius’s May 13 letter also suggested that the Committee for Emigrants in Cape Colony could spare some of its funds. In Cape Town, C.J. Brand, editor of De Zuid-Afrikaan, appealed in its pages on October 29 to the “owners of the mint of P.M. Burg” to donate alms to the church on behalf of those living far away.

Construction began on 34 Longmarket Street at the end of April 1840 and progressed in fits and starts over the course of the year. The congregation was still quite poor, and the building committee had to request a loan from the Volksraad for the church fund on September 29. The Volksraad granted the loan, and so the building was finished a few months later and inaugurated in 1841. At first, worshipers needed to bring their own pews and chairs until the congregation could afford to purchase permanent ones. The Covenant Church, intended only as a temporary placeholder, remained in use until the second Voortrekker Church was completed in April 1861.

== Covenant Church saved ==
After the new church opened, the Covenant Church first became a school, but it was sold by the congregation in 1874. Advisor Ernest George Jansen, later Governor-General of South Africa, saw it become a pharmacy and part of a smithy as a lawyer in the city in the early 20th century; on his way to church each Sunday, he became concerned as to the historic building’s state of neglect. The local NGK pastor, Rev. George Murray Pellissier (brother of Mrs. Mabel Jensen, Ernest’s wife), joined Jansen in advocating for the building’s preservation, founding a committee with Jansen as secretary in 1908. On December 16, 1912, a Voortrekker Museum was opened on the property, which would later be acquired by the city and remains active today under an expanded focus as the Msunduzi Museum. Until his death, Jansen was honorary chairman of the Museum Council, which timed its July meetings to match his winter stay in Natal so he could attend.

The opening of the museum was only one of Jansen’s two main goals. In De Bode on July 1, 1914, he wrote an open letter to the Minister of Home Affairs, stating “I have the honor to inform you that steps are now being taken to implement the second part of the original plan, namely the erection of a monument in honor of Piet Retief, Gerrit Maritz, Piet Uys, and other Voortrekkers.” Although the government did not provide immediate financial support, the public did raise money specifically to build a statue of Retief. The driving force behind this was Mrs. Jansen, who unveiled Coert Steynberg’s statue in Pietermaritzburg on April 6, 1962 having paid off R10,000 of the interest.

== Later developments ==
The second Voortrekker Church (the 1861 construction) was later demolished to make way for the Thanks Church. The cornerstone of the current building was laid on April 6, 1961, after a long struggle to secure plot 33, next to the Covenant Church yard. In a granite podium in the façade lies said cornerstone. Both church and monument, Paul Regent le Roux’s building itself symbolizes the events of December 16, 1838. The Vow is inscribed on the courtyard wall and surrounded by knobkerries and assegais in the Zulu horn formation. The skylight shining through the roof wall and the sharp spire symbolize the divine source from which the Voortrekkers believed their power came. The lampposts alongside the building represent the wagon lanterns at Blood River. The walls symbolize protective arms.

On April 6, 1962, the Thanks Church was opened by J.F.T. Naudé, followed by a service held by Rev. A.J. van der Merwe. The Retief statue, designed by Steynberg and weighing 363.3 kg, was unveiled the same day and featured him looking toward the “promised land.” The bricks in the pedestal come from where Retief first entered Natal after crossing the Drakensberg in 1837. The Rev. F.P. Myburgh opened the occasion with a Bible reading and a prayer, whence P.W.J. Groenewald gave a speech. After the choir sang, Mrs. Jansen unveiled the statue and gave her own speech.

The congregation sold the Thanks Church to the Museum Council in 2008, when the services moved around 20 km from downtown to Merrivale in Howick, the centre of a congregation acquired by the Pietermaritzburg one in 1999. The Afrikaner community in Pietermaritzburg drastically shrunk since around 1990, to the point that the two Afrikaans language high schools (Voortrekker High School and Gerrit Maritz) merged in January 1992, Gerrit Maritz’s campus being incorporated into the Durban University of Technology and Voortrekker gradually working in English instruction starting in 2009. By 2013, Voortrekker was fully bilingual, mandating 70 students a grade in two English classes, 40 white and 10 each Cape Coloured, Indian South African, and black.

The NGK congregations merged as their membership declined. Merrivale and the Napierville Reformed Church were absorbed by the Pietermaritzburg West Reformed Church, which in turn joined the Pietermaritzburg North Reformed Church. Pietermaritzburg South and Hayfields merged on March 1, 2012, bringing the numbers from a peak of seven to three local congregations. The four remaining congregations had 2,251 combined confirmed members in 2011. As early as the 2001 census, Pietermaritzburg was found to have only 4.2% of its population of 223,519 speaking Afrikaans, though the population was 27.3% white or Cape Coloured. Pietermaritzburg’s confirmed membership in 2015 stood at 1,858 (2,251 in 2012), 24 fewer than that of Vredendal (1,882 from 1,909 in 2012) and 93 fewer than Robertson (1,951 from 1,952), but 531 fewer than Vredenburg (2,389 from 2,408), 210 fewer than Hartenbos (2,068 from 2,308), and 1,755 fewer than East London (3,613 from 4,900).

== Select pastors ==
- Andries Conradus Stucki, died on January 26, 1847, as appointed pastor, but never invested and ordained as such
- Dirk van Velden, 1850 (acting)
- Hendrik Emmanuel Faure, 1853–1859
- Dammes Pierre Marie Huet, 1860–1867 (left for Holland; died on April 9, 1895)
- Abraham van Velden, 1868–1879 (served in spite of ill health; died in Natal in 1893)
- Daniël Ferdinand Bosman, 1880–1884, 1896–1897
- Pieter Taillefer Retief, 1892–1895
- Willem Petrus Rousseau, 1897 – July 8, 1903 (died in office)
- Helgard Müller (minister), 1884-1887
- George Murray Pellissier, 1907–1918
- Daniël Francois Erasmus, 1918–1920, afterward pastor in the Dutch Reformed Church in South Africa (NHK)
- Jacobus Ebenhaezer van Heerden, 1921–1945
- Hendrik Adrian de Wet, 1922 (afterward pastor of the daughter congregation Pietermaritzburg West)
- Carl Wilhelm Irene Pistorius, 1945–1948
- Andreas Petrus Morgenthal, 1948–1959
- Frederik Petrus Myburgh, 1959–1965
- Stephanus Petrus Senekal, February 11, 1965–1969
- Alexander Leon Wehncke, 1971–1976
- Johannes Theodoris Jordaan, October 5, 1974–1983
- Hendrik Pieter Basson, 1983–1986
- Carina Swart, 7 September 2013 – present

== Pietermaritzburg NGK congregations ==
The entire NGK confirmed membership shrunk from 953,000 in 1985 to 766,000 in 2015, around a 12% drop, but the numbers in the Pietermaritzburg area went down by 59%, from 4,491 to 1,858, during the same period. By 2013, Pietermaritzburg's numbers had reached 1,660.

Congregation	Founded	Conf. mem. 1985	Conf. mem. 2000	Conf. mem. 2015	Conf. mem. 2016
Pietermaritzburg	1839	794	752	256	144
Pietermaritzburg West	1922	442	500	Absorbed by North	-
Pietermaritzburg North	1949	430	490	690	612
Pietermaritzburg South	1949	1026	979	Absorbed by Hayfields	-
Napierville	1957	425	Absorbed by West	-	-
Merrivale	1974	361	234	Absorbed by mother church	-
Hayfields	1975	621	593	912	904
Thousand Hills	1980	354	Absorbed by South	-	-
Pietermaritzburg Reformed	1982	38	Absorbed by Durban Reformed	-	-
Total		4,491	3,548	1,858	1,660

== Sources ==
- Olivier, Rev. P.L. (1952). Ons gemeentelike feesalbum. Cape Town/Pretoria: N.G. Kerk-uitgewers, 1952.
- Potgieter, D.J. (ed.) (1974). Standard Encyclopaedia of Southern Africa. Cape Town: Nasionale Opvoedkundige Uitgewery (Nasou).
- Swart, Dr. M.J. (chairman, ed. committee) (1980). Afrikaanse kultuuralmanak. Auckland Park: Federasie van Afrikaanse Kultuurvereniginge.
