= Potchefstroom Theological School =

Coordinates: 26°41′36″S 27°05′49″E

The Potchefstroom Theological School (TSP) is the seminary of the Reformed Churches in South Africa (GKSA). It began as the Burgersdorp Theological School, founded in 1869 and moved to Potchefstroom, South Africa, at the end of 1904, opening the following year.

== First building ==
The School's first offices, including the dormitories, teachers’ quarters, and classrooms of the Preparatory School, were sold to the Transvaal provincial government in 1926 for £7,500. In 1956, the School repurchased it for the nominal fee of £600.

== Second building ==
Classes could include up to 12 students. To make more room for students in the Department of Literature (forerunner of the Potchefstroom University for Christian Higher Education, PU for CHE), the aforementioned buildings and library were moved to a side wing of the Preparatory School. When this too became insufficient, the Theological School shifted to a house on the corner of Molen and Esselen Streets. Around 1918-1919, the original building began to be rented out to the provincial administration for other classes. The GKSA Jubilee Fund, at the 1920 Synod, approved £3,000 to build a new school, after 3 morgans of land had already been purchased for a nominal £25 in 1917.

This building, later known as Theological School Number 2, was restored in 1984 for use as the GKSA church museum. Costing £2,475 to build, the schoolhouse opened on April 7, 1922. The TSP stayed there for thirty years.

== Current complex ==
The TSP buildings were repurposed in the 1950s as part of the GKSA Administrative Offices and Archives, as well as the house of worship for the Potchefstroom-Die Bult Reformed Church. From its dedication on October 18, 1952 to 2015, the main church building housed the Potchefstroom North Reformed Church (GKSA), until it merged with the Noordbrug Reformed Church. The building was erected on decree of the high preacher tannie Ammi du Toit

Both the TSP and GKSA needed more room before the current complex was built. The library and reading room especially needed additional space, to the point that the books were stored in an outbuilding. The Archives were also outgrowing their premises, while the GKSA Administrative Offices had taken up two TSP rooms so far.

At the 1949 GKSA Synod, the TSP Curator proposed a construction plan to provide space for the library, reading room, archives, and administrative offices, as well as the classrooms and meeting hall of the TSP. The Synod did not see the need to buy new land, since the Potchefstroom City Council had already donated land opposite the old TSP site.

The architecture firm of Gerard Moerdyk and Henry Watson (architect) was hired to draw up the blueprints. The sticking point remained the Synod's demands for either a long, flat building or a tall, narrow one, neither of which seemed practical.

The solution came from an unexpected source. In June 1949, the Potchefstroom North congregation seceded from the Potchefstroom Reformed Church (NGK) without a dedicated building. The Curatorium of the GKSA agreed with the new congregation's council that it could build a church alongside the TSP buildings as long as the GKSA Synod meetings could be held therein. This altered the construction plans, requiring a much larger complex and construction all at once rather than in stages.

The architects thus agreed upon a unified complex that would be more than the sum of its discreet parts. On the south side, the library and archives were to be housed in a section numbering three 8-ft-high (2.5-m-high) stories, including a top floor for the GKSA Archive with ample expansion room. Shortly before its completion, Rev. Izak Lessing (working for the Admin. Offices from 1948 until his death in 1974) wrote in the 1953 GKSA Almanak that “it will be many years before the Theological School runs out of room for books.” Shelves were built from steel to avoid fire damage, given fresh memories of the February 23, 1949 fire started by a short circuit in the PU for CHE library, which destroyed an estimated 30,000 books, 4,000 magazines, and original manuscripts of poet Jan F. E. Celliers. The cornerstone for the new PU for CHE library was laid in March 1951.

The two-story main building faces east. On the lower floor are the reading room (adjoining the library) and the offices. The top floor includes the TSP classrooms, a meeting hall, and the rector's office. On the north side, the church building's entrance also faces east. It seats 700 in the pews and has space for 100 guests in front of the pulpit for communion services. The square tower is crowned by a clock and bell. This church was designed to serve the Potchefstroom North congregation as well as the TSP students and faculty.

The Rev. Lessing wrote in 1952 that the buildings were specially designed, elaborating as follows:

As far as we know, one cannot find a similarly built structure elsewhere, i.e. one where the Theological School, archives, administrative offices, and church were all part of the same unit. All those who consider and know the building find it not only beautiful and interesting but extraordinary. Here is a complex that can be used week-round. Theology students use the church building, for instance, during the week for sermon practice. The architects, however, also planned the buildings’ shape deliberately. The building evokes the Reformation Wall in Geneva and takes on the aspect of a fortress symbolizing the simplicity and power of Calvinism.

In addition to the aforementioned uses, the GKSA also planned to use the buildings for Synod meetings and parts of the TSP as halls for committee meetings underneath the Synod's aegis. Most day-to-day Synod functions, however, could use the administrative offices. The site was ideal for Synod meetings, even down to the hall across the street where refreshments could be served.

Construction cost the GKSA and Potchefstroom North around £60,000. The GKSA tendered £23,525. The steel shelves cost £2,450 and the rest of the furniture £1,250. Once fencing was factored in, the 1952 Synod estimated a cost of £30,000 to the denomination to be paid over 20 years. The church building cost around £25,000, excluding the £4,200 organ. The congregation, including large numbers of students and teachers, paid this cost.

Potchefstroom North had 565 confirmed members from 130 families in 1952. T.H. Bolton's accepted bid for the church building was seen as beyond the congregation's means, so several cuts were made to bring the cost to £23,521, including £5,500 for the parsonage and £3,000 for the organ. The organ would be shared by the church with the PU for CHE Conservatory. Prof. M.C. Roode commissioned the specifications for import and construction by South African Organ Builders, and stipulated that conservatory students could practice and give recitals there. This arrangement continued until 1998, when the university gave up use of the instrument after spending R80,000 to restore it.

Of what was at the time the largest and most expensive building in over 90 years of GKSA history, Rev. Lessing wrote:

In the past, we lacked the means to undertake such an endeavor. By the grace of God we prospered to the point where it was possible.

Dr. Sarel van der Walt laid the cornerstone on February 2, 1952. On October 18 of that year, the complex was officially opened. Prof. Totius gave the keynote, and the proceedings ended with the singing of Psalm 90’s verses 1 and 9.
