= Eerste Pastorie Winburg =

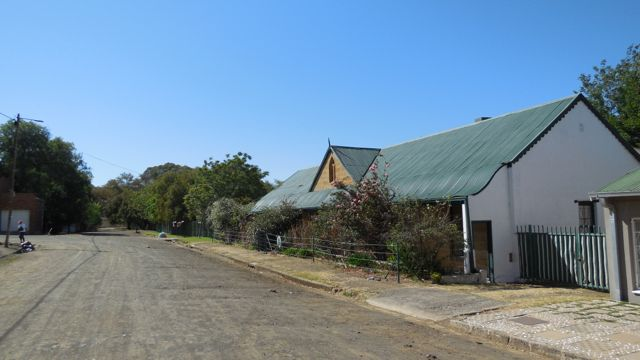

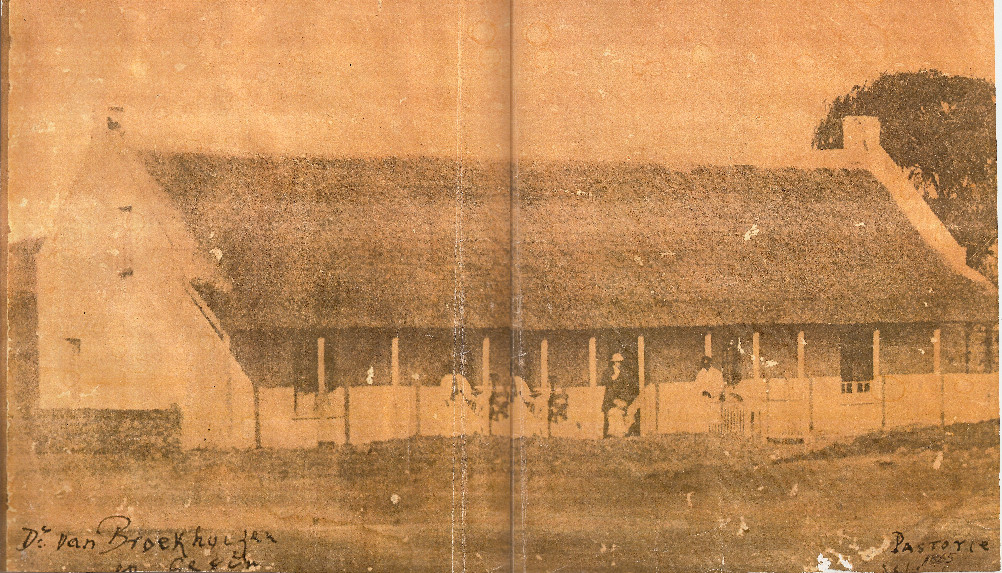
Eerste Pastorie 1865 - First build with thatch roof

The Eerste Pastorie is an historic residence in Winburg in the Free State of South Africa. The building was constructed in 1850 for the Dutch Reformed Church's pastor or predikant.

== History ==
=== 19th-century ===
In 1848, regular church services started being held in Winburg and the Church Council authorized the building of a church. A pastor, ds Dirk Van Velden, arrived in Winburg in September 1850 from the Netherlands.

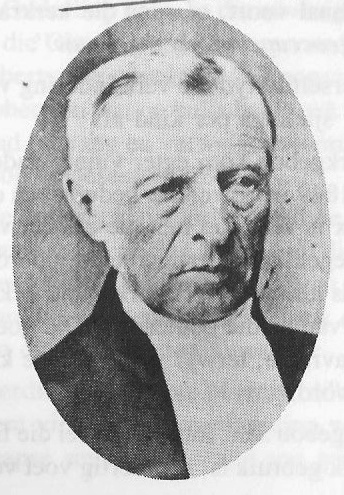
ds Dirk Van Velden

At the May 1850 Church Council meeting, the building of a house for Van Velden was tabled. It was to be built with the best building materials and with a roof of Tambookie grass. The house was built with 50 loads of stone and 40 000 bricks. Yellowwood planks and trusses were brought from the Cape Colony by oxcart for the floors and roof.

When Van Velden arrived, the house was not complete; he and his family had to live for eight months in the church's backroom. They lived in the Eerste Pastorie from mid 1851 to February 1854, during which time they recorded the first two births in the house, a daughter and a son.

Van Velden was reassigned to Ladismith in the Cape and a replacement in Winburg was not appointed until 1861. Predikants from neighboring towns may have used the house during their visits.

When H Van Broekhuizen was appointed in 1861, the town was in a drought and the church was in serious debt. Owing to bad health, he left Winburg in April 1866. The grass roof, which was leaking during the rainy season, was repaired in 1863.

In July 1867, Pieter Adriaan Coenraad van Heyningen from Kroonstad was appointed as the third Predikant. He held this position in Winburg until December 1893. .

By 1882, the old building was torn down due to moisture problems in the foundations; it was rebuilt on higher foundations. A larger house with a dressed sandstone walls was built. Van Heyningen's youngest daughter, Caroline laid the Hoeksteen at a ceremony on 9 March 1882.

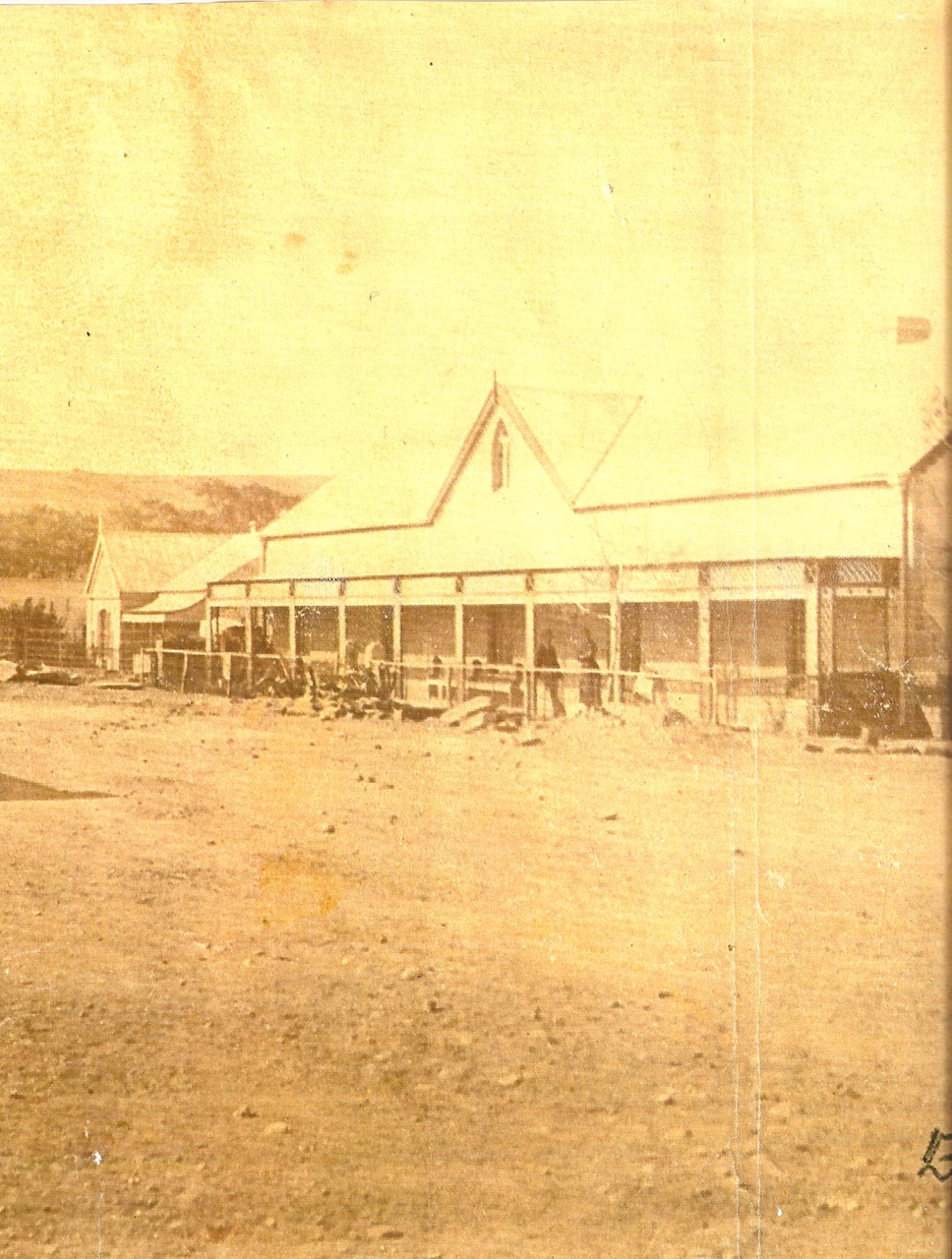
Eerste Pastorie 1884 - After the rebuild

The Predikant hosted important visitors from all over the world, both in Church matters and political matters. President Reitz of the Orange Free State was a regular visitor staying the Pastorie.

In 1894, Jacobus Johannes Tier Marquard took up residence in the Pastorie with his wife Margaret and his three children, Maria, John and Andrew. Three further children were born during his time in Winburg, Louise, Leopold and David. The Marquards lived through the Anglo Boer War in the Pastorie.

=== 20th-century ===
Marquard had joined the commandos as a “padre” and was captured at the surrender of Golden Gate in July 1900 and sent to a POW camp in the Cape.

During the war, Margaret Marquard wrote frequent letters to her mother in Stellenbosch from the Pastorie. Therein she details daily life from baking “biskuit for the commandos” in the kitchen hearth (still in use today), to the expropriation of first the horses, then the carriage and finally the house by the British.

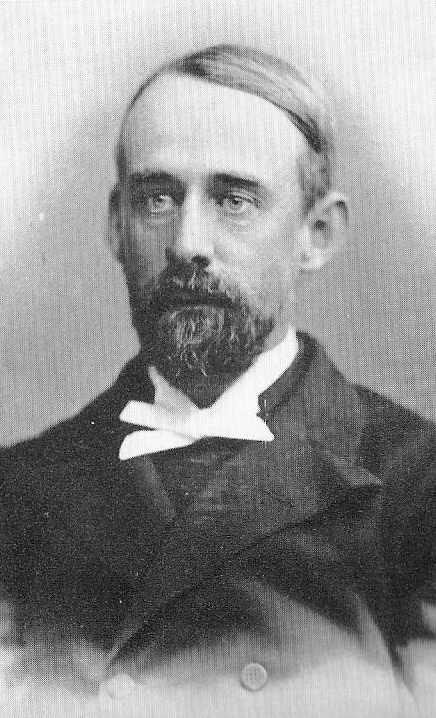
ds J J T Marquard

In 1906, Willem H Boshof became the town's minister and lived in the house until 1918. Aside from the continued development of the “kinderhuise”, he was the incumbent during the split of the congregation. The town was divided, as was South Africa, over the issue to support either the British or the German Empire in the First World War.

Joachim Jan Hendrik Hattingh was appointed in 1932 and was the last Predikant to live in the Pastorie. In 1947, the Dutch Reformed Church built a new parsonage, the Tweede Pastorie in Victoria Street, and sold the Eerste Pastorie to Mr H. L. Weyers for £2000.00. His wife Suzie S. Weyers lived in the Pastorie until her death in 1998.

In 1998, J. O. Van Jaarsveld bought the house after a period of vacancy. Unfortunately the house was broken into whilst unoccupied and the ornate chandelier and door to the dining room was stolen.

=== 21st-century ===
Today the house still has its Oregon floors and ceilings, the ceiling is in fact another floor, the roof trusses spanning from each side to the centerline without any internal support. The roof is corrugated iron, with a shaped front over the veranda. The Oregon sash windows are still in use, as are the two cast iron Victorian fireplaces. The two “back rooms” were probably only accessed from the outside originally and no doubt used as visitors quarters. Today they are solely accessed from the internal hall.

The base of the original yard to garden wall is still visible, and it was in this area that the well used to be.

The outside carriage house is now a narrower than standard double garage, the original stable still contains the five animal tie up manger. The horseman's room has a horse shoe over the door as a signal to its original use.

From research, the house can claim to be the oldest continually lived in house North of the Orange River. The three older houses in Bethulie, Philipolis and Winburg have not been lived in for years and survive as parts of museums.
