= NKU (disambiguation) =

NKU primarily refers to Northern Kentucky University, a public university located in Highland Heights, Kentucky, in the United States. It can also refer to the school's intercollegiate athletic program, the Northern Kentucky Norse.

Internationally, "NKU" may also refer to:

- Supreme Control Office of the Czech Republic, or "Nejvyšší kontrolní úřad" ("NKÚ")
- Nkaus Airport, an airport in Lesotho with International Air Transport Association airport code "NKU"
- The Young Communist League of Norway, Norges Kommunistiske Ungdomsforbund
- Nku, name used by the South African business executive Nonkululeko Nyembezi-Heita
