= Strooidakkerk =

Church in Paarl, South Africa

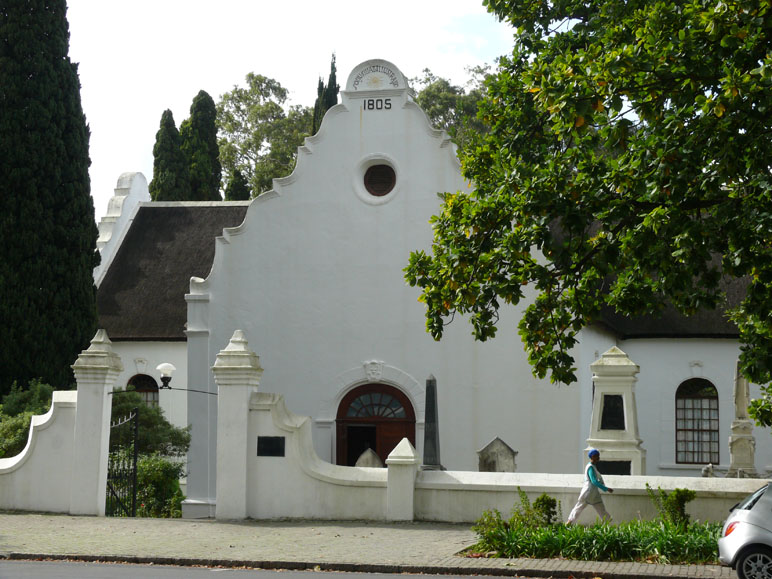
- Strooidakkerk
- 33°44′44″S 18°57′48″E
- Location: Paarl
- Country: South Africa
- Denomination: Nederduits Gereformeerde Kerk

History
- Founded: 1691

Architecture
- Functional status: Church

The Strooidakkerk is the third oldest congregation of the Dutch Reformed Church in South Africa. The congregation was formerly known as Drakenstein.

The congregation's origins are a result of the arrival of the French Huguenots to South Africa in 1688. They initially belonged to the NG congregation of Stellenbosch, but in 1691 they were formed into a separate congregation, then Drakenstein.

The first place of meeting was located somewhere in the vicinity of Simondium in a small building of wood and clay that some described as a "dirty hut" or "a giant". Here the Rev. Pierre Simond, who came to the Cape with the Huguenots, preached in elegant French, until he preached his last sermon at the Cape in April 1702 and returned to Europe.

Under the leadership of Rev. Petrus van Aken, a proper church building was erected in 1717, partly with the help of a bequest from the well-known Henning Huising. It probably stood on the north side of the present church building, where the grave of Rev. R.N. Alting (minister from 1784 to 1800) is. In 1805, the present church building was erected in the old Cape Dutch style, which is still known today as the Strooidakkerk and is the oldest church building in South Africa still in use as such.

The Pentecostal vigil, which is today a custom throughout the Dutch Reformed Church, originated from a week of prayer between Ascension Day and Pentecost Sunday in 1861.

== Ministers ==
- Pierre Simond, 1691 - 1702 (returned to Europe)
- Petrus van Aken, 1714 - 19 December 1724 (died in office)
- Lambertus Slicher, 1725 - 2 June 1730 (died in office)
- Salomon van Echten, 1738 - 7 January 1753 (returned to Holland)
- Petrus van der Spuy, 1753 - 1781 (emeritus; died in 1809)
- Robert Nicolaas Aling, 1784 - 24 April 1800 (died in office)
- Petrus Johannes van der Spuy, 1806 - March 1807 (died in office)
- Jean Guillaume Louis Gebhardt, 1810 - 12 October 1825 (died in office)
- Gottlieb Wilhelm Anthonie van der Lingen, 1831 - 7 November 1869 (died in office)
- Gilles van de Wall, 1870 - 1874 and 1875 - 1895 (emeritus; died on 2 January 1896)
- Pieter Gerhardus Jacobus Meiring, 1907 - 1921, then pastor of the Kerkbode
- David Frederik van der Merwe, 1918 - 1941 (then first pastor of Paarl Valley until March 1951)
- Daniel Gerhardus Malan, 1921 - 1931 (then professor at the Kweekskool)
- Joachim Frederik Mentz, 1931 - 1947
- Frederik Daniel Jacobus Brand, 1946 - ?
- Hendrik Daniel Alphonso du Toit, 1948 - ?
- Jan Lodewyk de Villiers, 1950 - 1956
- Tobias Johannes de Clerq, 1956 - 1962
- Dawid Willem de Villiers, 1953 - 1960
- Siebie Sieberhagen, 9 September 1960 - 1964
- Willem Johannes Louw, December 6 1963 - November 23 1969
- Schutz Marais, July 25 1964 - 1988
- Johannes Albertus Hurter, 1970 - 1973
- Dr. Ernst van der Walt, 1973 - 1978
