= Joyce Sikakane =

South African journalist and activist

- Born: Joyce Nomafa Sikakane; 1943 (age 82–83); Johannesburg, South Africa
- Other names: Joyce Sikakane-Rankin; Joyce Sikhakhane-Rankin
- Occupations: Journalist and activist
- Notable work: A Window on Soweto (1977)
- Spouse(s): Kenneth Rankin, m. 1974
- Children: 5

Joyce Nomafa Sikakane, later Sikakane-Rankin (born 1943), is a South African journalist and activist. She was detained by the Apartheid South African government for 17 months for her anti-apartheid activism.

== Biography ==
=== Early life and education ===
Sikakane was born in 1943 to Jonathan Sikakane and Amelia Nxumalo at the Bridgeman Memorial Maternity Hospital in Johannesburg, South Africa. She grew up in Soweto, the daughter of a lecturer at the University of the Witwatersrand. She attended Holy Cross Primary School until the African National Congress (ANC) called for a boycott due to the Bantu Education Act and the school was closed. Her parents eventually separated and she started to attend the boarding-school Inanda Seminary. She attended Orlando High School for a time after her mother gained custody but then returned to Inanda Seminary, from which she graduated in 1963. She did not want to enrol in any colleges in South Africa again due to the Bantu Education Act, instead she decided to become a journalist. She did later earn a Bachelor of Science Honours degree in the United Kingdom at the Open University.

=== Career and activism ===
Sikakane began her career as a journalism in 1960 at The World, a white-run newspaper that catered to a black audience. In 1968, she left The World to freelance for The Rand Daily Mail, where she would become the first black woman hired by the newspaper. At the Rand Daily Mail, she started to focus her writing on the impact that apartheid had on the Africans of South Africa.

On 12 May 1969, Sikakane was detained by police under the Terrorism Act and taken to Pretoria Central Prison, where she was interrogated about the African National Congress (ANC). She was charged under the Suppression of Communism Act and stood trial on 1 December 1969, along with 21 other activists. The charges were dropped on 16 February 1970 but Sikakane and the other activists were re-detained shortly afterwards. After about a total of 17 months of detention, she was released in late 1970. She eventually left South Africa in 1973 and continued to work for the ANC while in exile.

=== Marriage ===
Around the same time as she started working at the Rand Daily Mail, Sikakane fell in love with and became engaged to a Scottish doctor, Ken Rankin (1939–2011), but as such interracial relationships were illegal in South Africa, they made plans to marry outside the country. In 1973, Sikakane left South Africa for Zambia and the exiled branch of the ANC, and she and Rankin were married in 1974, subsequently moving to Scotland.

Sikakane has five children:

- Nkosinathi
- Nomzamo
- Samora
- Vikela
- Allan

=== Later life ===
In 1977, Sikakane's autobiography, A Window on Soweto, was published in London by the International Defence and Aid Fund (IDAF), in the year following the Soweto uprising.

In 1994, she returned to South Africa, being employed by the South African Broadcasting Corporation until 2001.

On 29 July 1997, she gave testimony before the Truth and Reconciliation Commission (TRC) about her experiences under apartheid, including her treatment while she was in her months-long detainment.

In 2008, an unsent letter addressed to Sikakane from Nelson Mandela was discovered by a Nelson Mandela Foundation archivist.

=== Other ===
Sikakane is among the writers featured in Margaret Busby's 1992 anthology Daughters of Africa.

== Publications ==
=== Autobiography ===
- A Window on Soweto (IDAF, 1977)
