= Thandi Orleyn =

South African lawyer and businesswoman

- Born: Noluthando Dorian Bahedile Orleyn; 13 January 1956 (age 70); New Brighton, Cape Province; Union of South Africa
- Education: Inanda Seminary School
- Alma mater: University of Fort Hare; University of South Africa
- Occupations: Lawyer; businesswoman
- Political party: African National Congress
- Spouse: David Sekiti

Noluthando Dorian Bahedile "Thandi" Orleyn (born 13 January 1956) is a South African lawyer and businesswoman who is currently the chairperson of Impala Platinum and BP Southern Africa. She rose to prominence in the business world as a co-founder and executive director of Peotona Holdings, a prominent black economic empowerment (BEE) investment vehicle. Before that, she was director of the public Commission for Conciliation, Mediation and Arbitration and a practicing lawyer.

== Early life and education ==
Orleyn was born in New Brighton, a township outside Port Elizabeth in the former Cape Province. She matriculated at Inanda Seminary School in 1974 and went on to study law at the University of Fort Hare and University of South Africa. She became involved in anti-apartheid activism as a teenager in the Cape Province and remained so after moving to Katlehong, where Bertha Gxowa became her political mentor.

== Legal career ==
Orleyn spent the first decade of her career in legal practice at the progressive Legal Resources Centre before becoming national director of the Independent Mediation Service of South Africa during the post-apartheid transition. Between 1997 and 2002, she was national director of the post-apartheid Commission for Conciliation, Mediation and Arbitration (CCMA). Part of her tenure there was consumed by a prolonged internal controversy over the sacking of the commission's national registrar, Monde Zimema.

After leaving the CCMA, she returned to law practice at commercial law firm Routledge Modise. She also spent time as an adjunct professor in labour law at the University of Cape Town and co-wrote a book on the law of workplace sexual harassment, Sexual Harassment in the Workplace: Law, Policies and Processes, that was published in 2005.

== Business career ==
In 2005 Orleyn co-founded an investment vehicle called Peotona Holdings with Cheryl Carolus, Dolly Mokgatle, and Wendy Lucas-Bull. The company launched that year in a high-profile R3.8-billion black economic empowerment (BEE) transaction that saw Peotona, in partnership with Manne Dipico's Ponaholo Investment Holdings, acquire a minority stake in De Beers Consolidated Mines. Peotona was also a lead partner in a R1.1-billion BEE deal with Lafarge in 2006, and it did a R1.1-billion BEE deal with electronics group Reunert in 2007. As part of the latter deal, Orleyn became a non-executive director of Reunert in May 2007. In 2008 Empowerdex ranked her ninth on its list of South Africa's 50 most powerful black directors, and by 2012 she was the fifth richest woman in the country according to the Sunday Times Rich List.

In 2011, Orleyn was appointed as chairperson of the board of BP Southern Africa, replacing Rams Ramashia. She was a board member of Impala Platinum (Implats) between 2004 and 2015 and returned in 2020 as Implats chairperson, replacing Mandla Gantsho. She has also served on the boards of Toyota South Africa and Ceramic Industries.

== Other activities ==
Among her other stints in public service, Orleyn has served as chairperson of the remuneration committee of the South African Reserve Bank; as chairperson of the council of the University of Fort Hare; and as a director of the Ombudsman for Banking Services, Cricket South Africa, and the Industrial Development Corporation. In 2019 she was a member of the seven-member selection panel, chaired by Trevor Manuel, that advised President Cyril Ramaphosa to appoint Edward Kieswetter as commissioner of the South African Revenue Service.

She is a member of the African National Congress (ANC) and in March 2022 was appointed to serve in the party's internal National Disciplinary Committee. She is also a member of the board of the South African branch of the International Women's Forum and the chairperson of the Legal Resources Centre.

== Honours ==
In 2025, the University of Fort Hare awarded Orleyn an honorary doctorate.

== Personal life ==
She is married to David Sekiti, with whom she has three children.
