= Koloi Lebona =

South Africa guitarist and music producer

Hendrik "Koloi" Lebona (2 August 1942-2013) was a South African guitarist and music producer. He is credited for discovering Brenda Fassie. His first acts were Afrofunk and Blues.

== Early life and education ==
Lebona was born 2 August 1942, in Winburg. He attended the Athlone School for the Blind in Cape Town.

== Career ==
Lebona founded the short-lived Black Label with Jimmy Mojopelo and Babsy Mlangeni. With Babsy Mlangeni, John Mothopeng, Jimmy Mojapelo, and Sy Falatsi, Lebona formed The All Rounders Band. Lebona and Mlangeni, whom he produced and who had the hit "Sala Emma," later became members of the Black Artists Management label.

In 1979, Lebona promoted the careers of pop singer Brenda Fassie and Ezra Ngcukana, whose debut album he produced in 1989. In 1984, he founded his label Khaya Records, where Saitana (Love Fever), "Special Cane Mahlelebe," and bands such as AFUBI (Get Up and Party) and Bayete (Shosholoza) released records. Together with Sipho Mabuse, he supported Paul Simon in his Graceland project in 1985. He also produced music by Philip Tabane/Malombo, Barney Rachabane, McCoy Mrubata, the African Jazz Pioneers, Jonathan Butler, and Jonas Gwangwa (Flowers of the Nation), among others; he also appeared in the documentary film Under African Skies (2012). He was awarded the Lifetime Achievement Award by the South African Music Awards for his life's work. He was also a founding member of the South African Blind Musicians Association.

== Personal life ==
Lebona died in 2013 at the age of 71.
