= Dutch Reformed Church, Ficksburg =

Church in Ficksburg, South Africa

Dutch Reformed Church
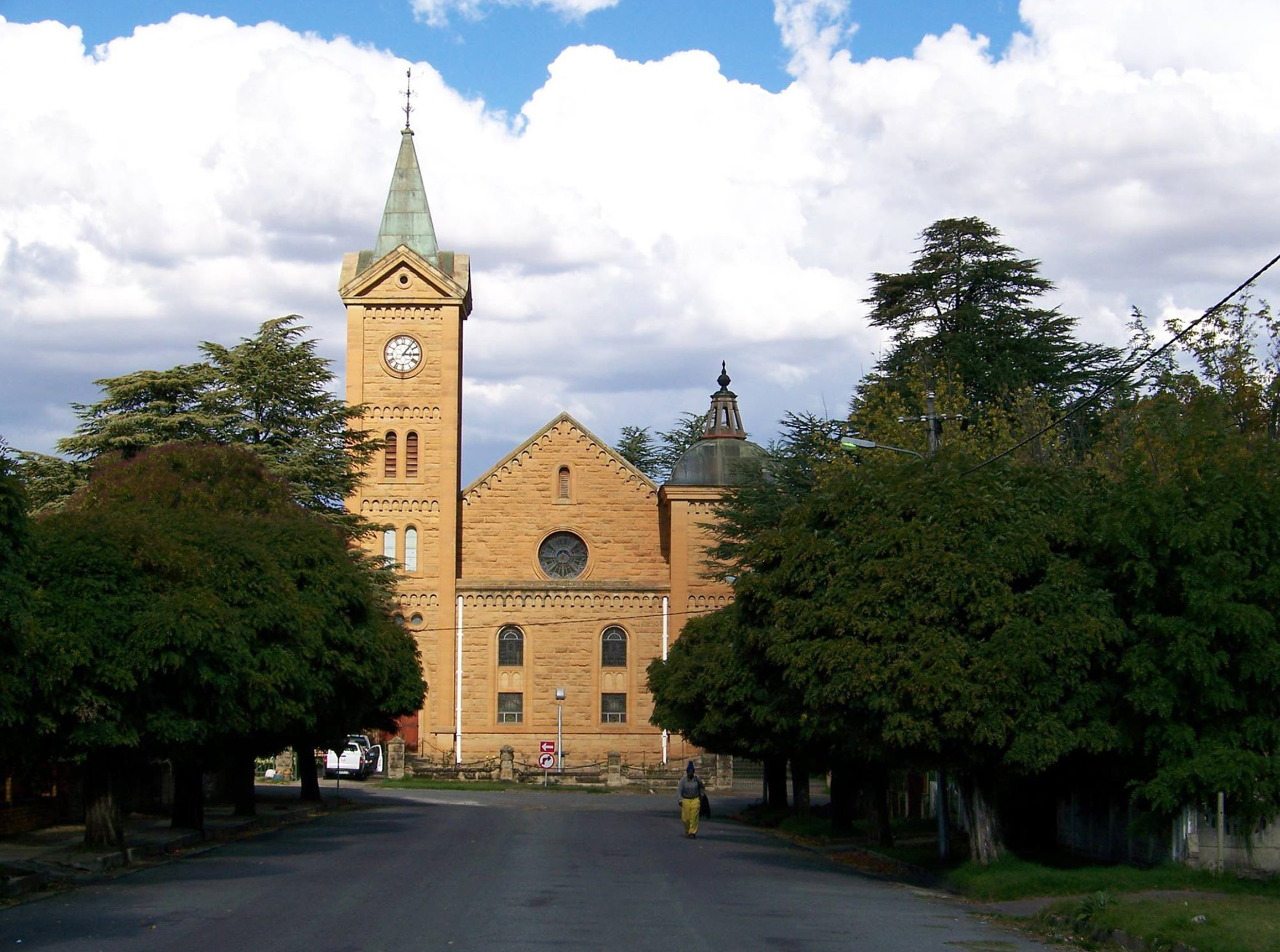
- Location: Ficksburg
- Country: South Africa
- Denomination: Nederduits Gereformeerde Kerk

History
- Founded: 1869

Architecture
- Functional status: Church

The Dutch Reformed Church in Ficksburg is an Eastern Free State congregation of the Dutch Reformed Church with its centre in the town of Ficksburg. When the congregation was founded in 1869, it was only the 13th congregation in the Free State Synod. The congregation celebrates its 150th anniversary in 2019.

From 1970 to 1999, the congregation of Ficksburg-Noord existed alongside the mother congregation here, but in the latter year it was incorporated into the Ficksburg congregation, even though the professing members of the congregations together in 1999 were barely 200 fewer than when they split off 29 years earlier. The only other Free State towns that have only one Dutch Reformed congregation after incorporation are Hennenman (both the East and West congregations were incorporated into the mother congregation at the same time in 2012) and Viljoenskroon (the East congregation was incorporated into the mother congregation in 2011). However, within the next 15 years this decreased sharply from 1 153 to 656 in 2014 as a result of the larger charismatic churches that were established in the town.

== Background ==
Ficksburg, situated in the fertile Conquered Area, takes its name from Gen. J.I.J. Fick, a Boer hero of the Basotho War of 1865. The congregation was founded in 1869 when Fouriesburg (Witteberge), Rosendal, Clocolan and part of Marquard still formed part of the congregation. According to the minutes, the first church council meeting was held on 1 June 1872 at Ficksburg under the chairmanship of Rev. P.V.A. van Heyningen, minister of Winburg and consultant of Ficksburg. He was already Winburg's third minister. Only four church council members attended the meeting at which an elder and three deacons were then elected. At the church council meeting of 12 October 1873, the church council decided to enlarge the church building (to 20 x 25 feet), to provide four windows and to "make the floor of anthills". This first church building was consecrated in 1873. At the meeting of 12 January 1874, the church council decided to "purchase lightning conductors for the church". At the meeting of 12 July 1875, it was decided to have four elders and eight deacons from now on.The meeting was held under the chairmanship of Rev. Louis Hugo of the Dutch Reformed congregation of Ladybrand. He was that congregation's first pastor. After he was expelled by the Dutch Reformed congregation of Beaufort West in 1896, he was later reinstated and worked with blessing among the lepers on Robben Island for 10 years. He died on the island on 21 August 1907 and was buried there.

== Ministers ==
- Rutger Hendrik van de Wall, 26 August 1877 – 3 January 1881 (after whom NG congregation Vishoek, then Simonstown, was named; ministry resigned in 1896; died in 1912)
- Hermanus van Broekhuizen, 1882 – 23 October 1894 (died in office)
- Pieter Johannes Jurgens Boshoff, 1895–1899 (died 14 April 1944)
- John Daniel Kestell, 1903–1912
- Antonie Johannes Troskie, 1913–1926
- Andries Stockenström, 1927–1949
- Dr. Daniël Johannes Barnard, 1943–1945
- Dennis Johannes McDonald, 1947–1952
- Petrus van Niekerk, 1951–1968
- Johannes Willem Hanekom, 1953–1957
- Stanley Charles Biggs, 1971 – November 1980 (accepts his emeritus)
- Hendrik Matthys Strydom, 1981 -1987
- Harry Butler van Zyl, 1987–1994 (accepts his emeritus)
- George Deysel (also pastor of the North congregation)
- Janlu Kuyler 2006-2014
- Werner Redelinghyus 2014 - 2019
- Rev. Waldemar Stumpfe 2020 - present

== Sources ==
- (in Dutch) Maeder, ds. G.A. en Zinn, Christian. 1917. Ons Kerk Album. Kaapstad: Ons Kerk Album Maatschappij Bpkt.
- (in Afrikaans) Oberholster, prof. dr. J.J. 1964. Die Nederduitse Gerformeerde Kerk in die Oranje-Vrystaat. Bloemfontein: Die N.G. Kerk in die O.V.S.
- (in Afrikaans) Olivier, ds. P.L., 1952. Ons gemeentelike feesalbum. Kaapstad en Pretoria: N.G. Kerk-uitgewers.
- (in Afrikaans) Stockenström, Andries. 1957. Gedenkboek van die Nederduitse Gereformeerde gemeente Ficksburg, 1869 tot 1957. Die Kerkraad: Ficksburg.
