= Andries Tatane =

South African citizen (1978–2011)

- Born: 22 February 1978
- Died: 13 April 2011 (aged 33); Ficksburg, Free State, South Africa
- Spouse: Rose Tatane

Andries Tatane (22 February 1978 – 13 April 2011) was a South African citizen who was shot and killed by police officers during a service delivery protest in Ficksburg. His murder was captured on TV by a media crew that was covering the protest on that day and shocked the whole country. Seven police officers accused of his murder and assault were acquitted in the Ficksburg Regional Court in March 2013.

== Biography ==
Andries was a member of the ANC until 2008 when he left the ANC to join the breakaway party COPE. In the months before he died he left COPE to join the Meqheleng Concerned Citizens (MCC), an autonomous local community organisation. He was a mathematics teacher, a community activist, journalist, community newspaper publisher and possible independent candidate for the municipal elections due to take place in May 2011. He was married to Rose Tatane.

== Events surrounding his death ==
On 13 April 2011, Andries Tatane, together with 4,000 other protesters, took to the streets and marched to Setsoto Municipal Offices in Ficksburg, Free State, South Africa to protest against poor service delivery in the area. The protesters were met by police members who attempted to disperse the crowd with water cannons. While some arrested protesters were being bundled into police vans, Tatane tried to argue with the police and to block a water cannon vehicle, at which point he was grabbed around one arm by a police officer. Tatane was seen to pull his arm away from the officer who then started to beat him with a baton. Tatane appeared to move aggressively towards this officer. Four or five other police officers then pulled him away and began to kick and beat him with batons. During this time he was twice shot in the chest with rubber bullets. Tatane collapsed shortly after and died on the scene 20 minutes later.

While Tatane's death as a result of police action during a protest is by no means a unique event in South Africa, it had notably garnered greater nationwide attention than any previous such occurrence. One of the main reasons for this was that the entire incident was filmed on T.V. cameras and later broadcast during the prime time evening news of the national broadcaster, the SABC.

== Aftermath ==
Following Tatane's death, there has been public outrage about the manner in which he died.

Tatane's death has been described as "a watershed moment in public perceptions of state violence after apartheid".

An investigation into his death was launched by the Independent Complaints Directorate's commission. The South African Police Service has also launched their own internal investigation into the matter. The death of Tatane has placed both the issue of rising anger over a lack of service delivery as well as police brutality in the media spotlight, with comparisons being drawn to the deaths of Hector Pieterson and Steve Biko at the hands of police during the height of apartheid.

It has also emerged that this was not an isolated incident and that the ICD has investigated 1,769 separate incidents of people dying in police custody or as a result of police action in 2010. National Police Commissioner Bheki Cele's statement in late August 2009 that police officers should be able to "shoot to kill" without worrying about the consequences will undoubtedly be brought to the forefront again.

The ANC's National Spokesperson, Jackson Mthembu, condemned the brutality, but also chastised the SABC for broadcasting the footage during the prime time news, citing the fact that it might have upset sensitive viewers, calling on the Independent Communications Authority of South Africa (ICASA) to investigate the SABC's editorial decision. Mthembu has been one of the most vocal supporters of planned legislation to introduce a Media Appeals Tribunal to govern the South African media; legislation which is currently held in abeyance.

After visiting the Tatane family in Meqheleng, Ficksburg, on 19 April 2011, Anglican Archbishop of Cape Town, Dr Thabo Makgoba, directed attention to the lack of justice and delivery on promises which had preceded the incident and points out the irony of the protesters having been met with water cannons, "attacked with the very thing they don’t have the pleasure of in their daily lives." He called on the Minister of Co-operative Governance and Traditional Affairs, Sicelo Shiceka, to "visit and see the appalling conditions under which God’s people live" and the Minister of Human Settlements, Tokyo Sexwale, to "provide houses". He added that "Minister Nathi Mthethwa and President Zuma should publicly apologise for this embarrassing act of aggression by police."

The Archbishop has subsequently said: "Let us affirm and call for a renaming of our police services back to 'safety and security' and not a police 'force', for this force seems to maim and kill rather than offer safety and security."

There was an election boycott in the area following Tatane's death. In May 2011 it was reported that the Meqheleng Concerned Citizens group was a credible structure with growing influence. However, by December 2011 it had degenerated to the point of being described as "a toothless organisation led by calculating tenderpreneurs".

A number of police officers were charged with Tatane's murder but they were found not guilty on the grounds that Tatane's murderers could not be identified as they were wearing helmets. However, a British journalist was easily able to identify his killers from video footage.

== Cultural references to Tatane ==
In poetry, Andries Tatane's death is referenced in a work by Adam Haupt, entitled "For Andries Tatane". This poem has since been republished as the epilogue to a scholarly book titled Static: Race & Representation in Post-Apartheid Music, Media & Film

In Music, Andries Tatane is named in a struggle song of the Economic Freedom Fighters in memoriam of his death and solidarity for justice for his death.
