= Potchefstroom Reformed Church (NGK) =

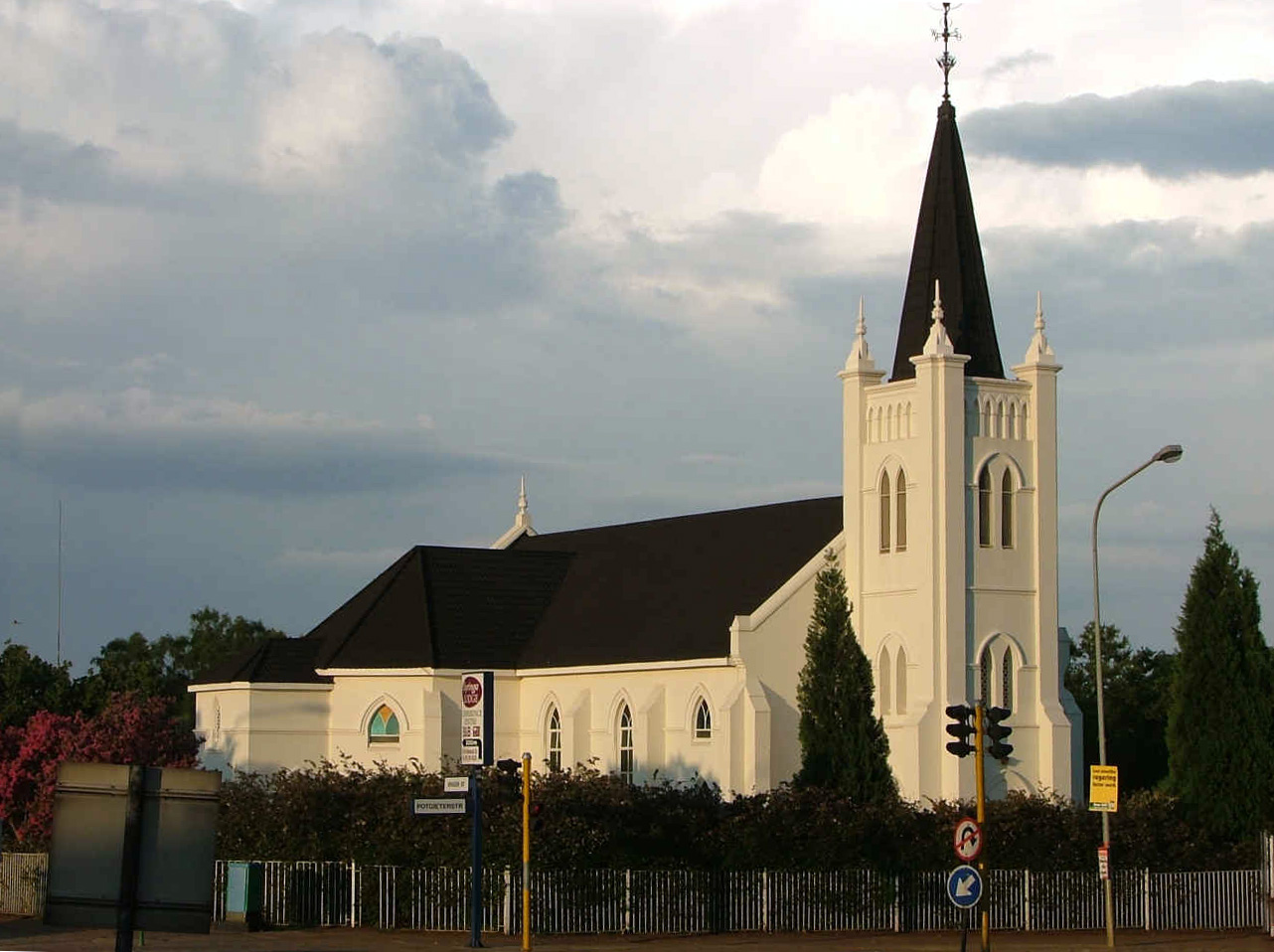

The Potchefstroom Reformed Church (in Potchefstroom, North West, South Africa) is the oldest congregation of the Dutch Reformed Church in South Africa (NGK) in what was then the Transvaal or South African Republic. At its founding in March 1842, it was the 28th congregation in what would later become South Africa and the tenth outside of the Western and Southern Cape Synod.

== Background ==
The congregation was founded on the banks of the Mooi River thanks to the efforts of Rev. Daniel Lindley, an American missionary who arrived in the Natal Colony shortly after the Great Trek and was moved by the plight of the pastor-less Voortrekker congregations. The Natalia Republic Volksraad appointed him as region-wide minister after he furnished proof of his ordination as a pastor of the Presbyterian Church in America. The church followed Cape patterns closely, and Rev. Lindley thus served an area stretching from Winburg to Potchefstroom.

== Foundation ==
Early the year after his appointment, Rev. Lindley arrived at the banks of the Mooi, and on March 26, 1842, he met members for the first time and baptized several children. This date is regarded as the foundation of the first congregation east of the Vaal. The first two registers record 103 confirmed and 188 baptized members, whom he returned to Potchefstroom to visit in 1844 and 1846. In 1848, Drs. Philip Eduard Faure and William Robertson became the first representatives of the Cape Church to visit Potchefstroom as it shifted toward serving members outside colonial boundaries.

== First building, 1851 ==
Just before the foundation of the congregation, on November 1, 1841, Commandant Hendrik Potgieter circulated a donation list to fund the construction of a church building. The Rev. Andrew Murray, Jr. became the minister of Bloemfontein in 1848 and started visiting Potchefstroom regularly as a consulent that year, preaching at the site on his third visit. Murray’s brother Rev. (and later Prof.) John Murray opened the finished church on April 19, 1851. Rev. Andrew Murray returned to visit the following year, accompanied by Rev. J.H. Neethling.

== NHK breakaway ==
No ministers from back west, however, wanted to settle in the pioneer settlement. Therefore, the congregation did not get its first pastor until the arrival of Rev. Dirk van der Hoff from the Netherlands on June 6, 1853. The Rev. Andrew Murray was to ordain him, but this was postponed and avoided when the church council decided in November of that year to separate from the Cape Church and found separate Transvaal denomination, the Dutch Reformed Church in South Africa (NHK). However, many members left by Elder Wessel Badenhorst refused to follow Rev. Van der Hoff and stayed in the NGK. The NGK worshipers had to make do with visiting preachers until Rev. Frans Lion Cachet arrived from Utrecht to help organize them.

== First pastor ==
The first official pastor of the Potchefstroom NGK, however, was proponent J.P. Jooste, appointed in 1868 and serving until 1881, during which time a new church was built to replace the old NHK one. By 1889, Rev. H.J.L. du Toit and Rev. C.D. du Toit were NGK and NHK ministers respectively. The Rev. H.J.L. du Toit, who played a major role in the merger of the two denominations in 1889, left for Lichtenburg once Rev. M.L. Fick began serving as curate and later pastor of the united congregation. The Rev. C.D. du Toit, however, joined the once more schismatic NHK almost immediately, depriving the NGK of all the hard-won gains of the previous years including Rev. Jooste’s church. On February 3, 1894, Rev. Fick’s NHK saw its current church cornerstone laid by State President of the South African Republic Paul Kruger. It was built by architect Richard Wocke.

Along with Kruger, who married in Potchefstroom, Voortrekker leader Andries Pretorius baptized his children there. Among later pastors of the congregation were Drs. Beyers Naudé and Nico Smith, both prominent opponents of apartheid.

== Mooi River secession ==
The Potchefstroom-Mooi River Reformed Church (NGK) was founded on February 5, 1917, as a result of the turmoil of World War I and the Maritz Rebellion of 1914. The old church building had been deemed a “Rebel” edifice. During World War II, Mooi River was nicknamed the “Barrish Church” while the mother church was labeled the “Worst Church”; the two churches were frequented by South African Party/United Party voters and National Party voters respectively.

== Building in ruins ==
A fire almost razed the building to the ground on July 5, 2007. Restoration work took three years, but the 1894 building re-opened with a witness service on Sunday, November 7, 2010. Former minister Adriaan Vlok gave the keynote, though organ builder Jan Elsenaar was still restoring the organ, which was finished in August 2011. The organ had first been used in Birmingham, United Kingdom in 1897, but was removed and sold to a Dutch organ builder many years later, from whence Elsenaar obtained it and bought it for the congregation. By the first service in three years, the restoration bill had reached R7.4 million, paid for with insurance, bequests, and other donations.

== Select pastors ==
- Jacobus Petrus Jooste, 1868 - 1882
- Hendrik Johannes Louw du Toit, 1882 - 1887
- Marthinus Laurentius Fick, 1889 - 1919, afterward Secretary of the Alms Committee of the Transvaal
- Johannes Francois Botha, 1905 - 1908
- Daniël Stephanus Burger Joubert, 1914 - 1916
- Daniel Jozua Pienaar, 1920 - 1928 (retired; died on December 13, 1933)
- Gerrit Dirk Worst, 1929 - 1954 (retired)
- Johannes Jacobus Fourie, 1942 - 1943 (curate)
- Ruben Fourie, 1952 - 1963
- Beyers Naudé, 1955 - 1957
- James Ignatius Kemp, 1957 - 1963
- William Henry du Plessis, 1959 - 1970
- Alewyn Petrus Burger, 1960 - 1970
- Gert Cornelius Hattingh, 1964 - 1968
- Jacobus Ignatius Bornman, May 10, 1969 - 1974
- Jurie Hendrik Wessels, 1975 - 1981
- Johan Christiaan Lamprecht, 1974 - 1979
- Charles Jacobus Cassell, 2003 - 2006 (left to join the Afrikaans Protestant Church)

== Sources ==
1. Dreyer, Rev. A. (1924). Eeufeest-Album van de Nederduits Gereformeerde-Kerk in Zuid-Afrika 1824 - 1924. Cape Town: Publikatie-kommissie van de Z.A. Bijbelvereniging.
2. Hanekom, T.J. (ed.) (1952). Ons Nederduitse Gereformeerde Kerk – gedenkboek by ons derde eeufees 1952. Cape Town: N.G. Kerk-uitgewers.
3. Hofmeyr, George (chief ed.) (2002). NG Kerk 350,. Wellington, South Africa: Lux Verbi.BM.
4. Kerkbode
5. Maeder, Rev. G.A. and Zinn, Christian (1917). Ons Kerk Album. Cape Town: Ons Kerk Album Maatschappij Bpkt.
6. Olivier, Rev. P.L. (compiler) (1952). Ons gemeentelike feesalbum. Cape Town/Pretoria: N.G. Kerk-uitgewers.
