= Mary Mdziniso =

Swazi educator and politician

Member of the Senate
- In office 1967–1998

Personal details
- Born: 1924; Bhobokazi, Swaziland
- Died: 1 June 2000 (aged 75–76)

Mary Mdziniso (1924 – 1 June 2000) was a Swazi educator and politician. She was appointed to the Senate in 1968, becoming the country's first female member of Parliament.

== Biography ==
Mdziniso was born in Bhobokazi in Manzini District in 1924. Her mother died while giving birth and her father (Efrom Dlamini) took her to the mission at Bethany in South Africa. Aged four, she was transferred to a mission at Mbuluzi, where she was fostered by Mary Peak Brown, whose first name she took. In 1929 she started her education at Mbuluzi Girls' School.

After leaving school in 1937, she attended Inanda Seminary School in Natal, where she trained to be a domestic science teacher. After three years of training, she returned to Mbuluzi Girls' School and began teaching. During her time in Inanda, she met Mdziniso, who was training to be a pastor. The couple married in 1947. She subsequently worked at the Swazi National High School. In 1965 she entered the civil service as a Domestic Science Field Officer in the Ministry of Agriculture. She founded the Lutsango lwaka Ngwane women's organisation two years later.

Following the 1967 elections, Mdziniso was appointed to the Senate by King Sobhuza II, becoming the first female member of parliament. In 1994 she became Deputy President of the Senate, remaining a Senator until 1998. She also served on the board of the Swazi Red Cross and Dairy Board, and was awarded an honorary doctorate of law by the University of Swaziland.

She died on 1 June 2000.
