= Lauretta Ngcobo =

South African writer and activist (1931–2015)

- Born: Lauretta Gladys Nozizwe Duyu Gwina; 13 September 1931; Ixopo, Natal, South Africa
- Died: 3 November 2015 (aged 84); Johannesburg, South Africa
- Education: Inanda Seminary School; University of Fort Hare
- Occupations: Novelist; essayist; teacher; activist
- Notable work: And They Didn't Die (1990); Cross of Gold (1981)
- Spouse: Abednego Bhekabantu Ngcobo (m. 1957)

Lauretta Ngcobo (13 September 1931 – 3 November 2015) was a South African novelist and essayist. After being in exile between 1963 and 1994 – in Swaziland, then Zambia and finally England, where she taught for 25 years – she returned to South Africa and lived in Durban. Ngcobo's writings between the 1960s and early 1990s have been described as offering "significant insights into the experiences of Black women of apartheid's vagaries". As a novelist, she is best known for And They Didn't Die (1990), set in 1950s South Africa and portraying "the particular oppression of women who struggle to survive, work the land and maintain a sense of dignity under the apartheid system while their husbands seek work in the mines and cities."

== Early years ==
The daughter of teachers Rosa (née Cele) and Simon Gwina, Lauretta Gladys Nozizwe Duyu Gwina was born in Ixopo, KwaZulu-Natal, and grew up there. She attended Inanda Seminary School, near Durban, going on to become the first woman from her area to study at the University of Fort Hare. She taught for two years, then took a job with the Council for Scientific and Industrial Research in Pretoria. In 1956, she was a participant in the women's anti-pass march and was one of the main speakers.

In 1957, she married Abednego Bhekabantu Ngcobo, a founder and member of the executive of the Pan Africanist Congress, who in 1961 was sentenced to two years' imprisonment under the Suppression of Communism Act.

== Exile, 1963–94 ==
In 1963, facing imminent arrest, she fled the country with her two young children, moving to Swaziland, then Zambia and finally England, where she taught at primary school level for 25 years. She was eventually appointed deputy head and then acting head of Lark Hall Infant School in Lambeth, south London, where she was the only black staff member. In 1984, she became president of ATCAL (the Association for the Teaching of Caribbean, African, Asian and Associated Literatures), a campaigning group of teachers and writers promoting a more diverse curriculum in the British educational system.

=== Writing ===
Ngcobo also found time to write two novels, Cross of Gold (1981) and And They Didn't Die (1990), which latter has been described as "path-breaking in its portrayal of the experiences of a black woman that gives its main character, Jezile, an interiority and a voice rarely seen in South African literature before this novel's publication. It is singular in highlighting the damaging, overlapping effects of apartheid and customary law on the lives of African women confined to apartheid Bantustans." The review in Publishers Weekly said: "Ngcobo writes with grace and compassion about one woman's suffering, meanwhile providing insights into Bantu village culture, the injustices of the legal system, the routines and atmosphere of black prisons, and the indomitable spirit of an oppressed people." In 2018, Annie Gagiano wrote of And They Didn't Die: "The horrors of this time have still not been erased, but a novel of this stature bears witness to them, as it does to the astonishing courage and strength of many of apartheid's victims in a way that is adequate to the place, time and people we must never forget, and in whose memory we have to continue to strive for a country in which all lives are cherished and cherishable."

In addition to being a novelist, Ngcobo was the editor of Let It be Told: Essays by Black Women Writers in Britain (Pluto Press, 1987), which included contributions from Amryl Johnson, Maud Sulter, Agnes Sam, Valerie Bloom, Grace Nichols, Marsha Prescod, Beverley Bryan, Stella Dadzie and Suzanne Scafe. Ngcobo also wrote a children's book, Fikile Learns to Like Other People (1994), and in 2012 edited an anthology of stories of South African women in exile, entitled Prodigal Daughters, which was chosen as a Book of the Year by Neelika Jayawardane of Africa is a Country.

== Return to South Africa ==
Ngcobo returned to South Africa with her family in 1994, following the election in which the African National Congress came to power. Her husband died in 1997.

In South Africa she again taught for a while before becoming a Member of the KwaZulu-Natal Legislature representing the Inkatha Freedom Party, where she spent 11 years before retiring in 2008. She published many academic articles, attended many writers' conferences, and delivered papers at various universities.

She died in hospital in Johannesburg, aged 84, on Tuesday, 3 November 2015, following a stroke. The Sunday Times of South Africa obituary described her as a "writer and activist who gave vulnerable women a voice", while Barbara Boswell of the African Gender Institute at the University of Cape Town wrote: "Lauretta Ngcobo's death has robbed us of a significant literary talent, freedom fighter, and feminist voice."

== Awards ==
In 2006, Ngcobo received the Lifetime Achievement Literary Award of the South African Literary Awards.

In 2008, she was awarded the Order of Ikhamanga in Silver for her "excellent achievements in the field of literature and through her literary work championing the cause of gender equality in South Africa".

She was named an eThekwini Living Legend in 2012, and in 2014 received an honorary doctorate of Technology in Arts and Design from Durban University of Technology.

== Legacy ==
In 2021, her daughter Zikethiwe Ngcobo directed a 10-minute documentary entitled Lauretta: And They Did Not Die about her mother's struggles as a writer and activist, exploring her legacy and "transformatory impact on black women’s literature".

Literary scholar Barbara Boswell edited the volume Lauretta Ngcobo: Writing as the Practice of Freedom, including analyses of Ngcobo's life, voice and legacy, as well as key texts.

== Selected works ==
Novels

- Cross of Gold, novel (Prentice Hall, 1981, ISBN 978-0582785199)
- And They Didn't Die, novel (London: Virago Press, 1990, ISBN 978-1853811531). Extract in Margaret Busby (ed.), Daughters of Africa, 1992, pp. 407–411.

As editor

- Let It Be Told: Essays by Black Women Writers in Britain (Pluto Press, 1987, ISBN 978-0745302546; new edn Virago, 1988, ISBN 978-0860686330)
- Prodigal Daughters — Stories of South African Women in Exile (University of KwaZulu-Natal Press, 2012, ISBN 978-1869142346)

For children

- Fikile Learns to Like Other People (1994)
