= Inanda Seminary School =

Coordinates: 29°42′6.38″S 30°55′42.86″E

Inanda Seminary Secondary School
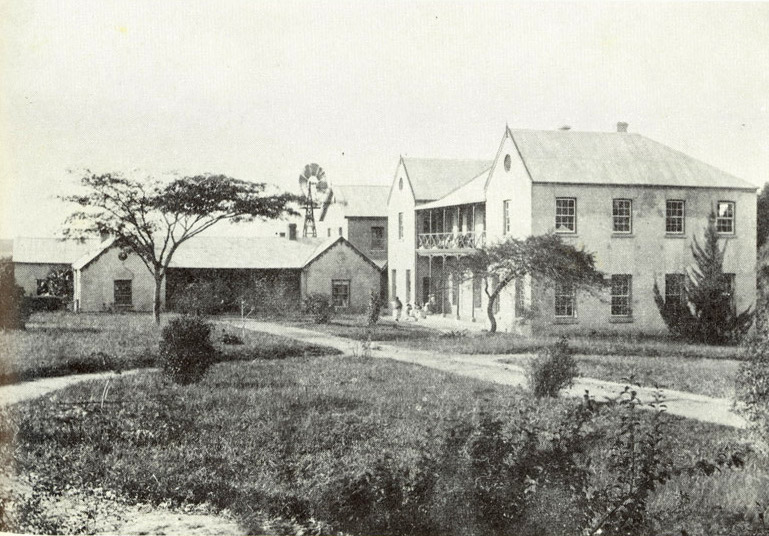
- The original building is on the left
- Inanda; KwaZulu-Natal; South Africa

Information
- Motto: Shine Where You Are
- Founded: 1869
- Founder: Daniel and Lucy Lindley
- Director: Judy Tate
- Principal: Thembi Ndlovu
- Chaplain: Rev Alice Kathleen Fabian-Williams

Inanda Seminary School is one of the oldest schools for girls in South Africa. It was founded in 1869 at Inanda, a settlement just over 20 miles (32 km) north of Durban, by Daniel and Lucy Lindley, an American missionary couple.

== History ==
On 20 November 1834, Daniel and Lucy Virginia (born Allen) Lindley married and they were sent by the American Board of Missions to South Africa. When they arrived in Cape Town they still had 1,000 miles (1,600 km) to cover. Their journey took a year by ox cart to get to Matabeleland. However, their plans were thwarted by the fighting that was taking place between the descendants of Dutch colonists (also called the Boers) and the Matebele. They successfully ministered to the Boers but they did not find success with native Africans until they set up the mission at Inanda.

In 1869 they realised that the Adams School was successfully creating educated African men but they had no prospect of finding an educated "good wife". They said "who are they going to marry? – these naked girls". The couple thought this was a problem and decided to found a school for nineteen young girls who would board at Inanda. The cost of this was borne by the American Missionary Board. The headteacher, Mary Kelly Edwards, was brought from Ohio and she was to serve the school for nearly sixty years.

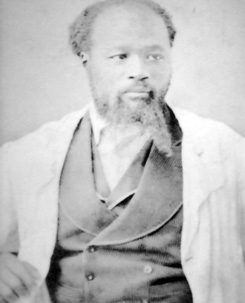
Rev. James Dube

When the Lindley family left South Africa in April 1873 they left one of their daughters who went on teach at the school. The Lindleys left the mission that they had established in the hands of the Reverend James Dube. Dube was the son of one of the first Christian converts at the mission. Dube was to die in 1877 but not before he had fathered John Dube who was to found a newspaper, Ohlange High School and take a leading role in creating the African National Congress. Lindley left Inanda having created what would become Inanda Seminary School, the Seminary, a church and several schools based in native huts.

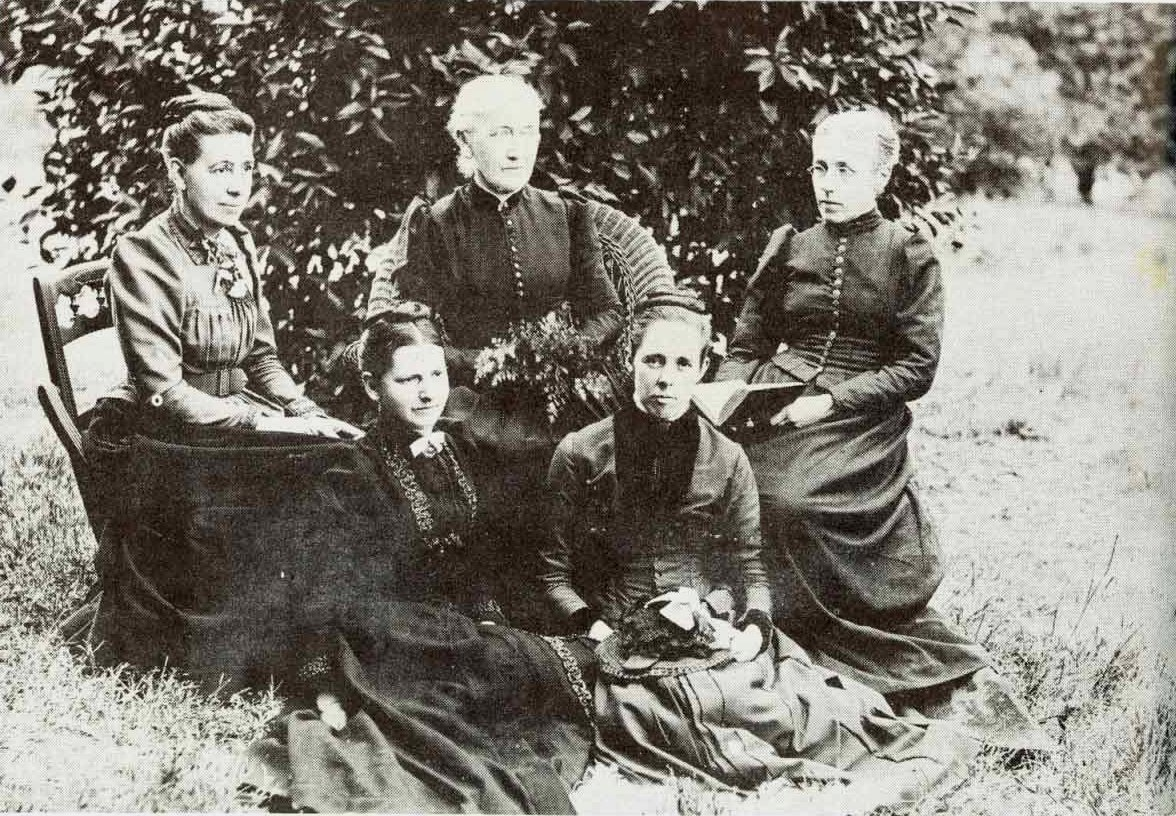
1891 teaching staff - Miss Phelps, Mrs Edwards, Miss Price and Miss Dixon and Mary Pixley in front

The school was able to avoid the full force of the Bantu Education Act. This act required schools that were not teaching white students to create a curriculum that was inline with the governments (low) ambitions for its black population. The school was allowed to operate outside the act which was denied to nearby Adams College. In 1956 Adams College had the choice of delivering unambitious education or selling its building and closing. The College chose to close.

Racial discrimination did not just happen outside the school. In the 1960s the black teachers were paid less than white teachers and there were separate places for them to sleep and eat. It was acknowledged as a problem but the funds were not made available to solve the problem. The living condition was solved on a school holiday when the black canteen was removed.

In the 1960s and 70s the school would receive 1500 applications from prospective students and these were whittled down to 90, based on a selection principle that involved recommendations, special exams, previous work and interview. The students nearly all came from families who could afford the fees but the school always funded a small number of students to ensure that it did not become devoted to "money snobbery".

In the 1970s the government again put the school under pressure. This time they refused to renew the visas for non-South African staff, removing their right of residence in the country. The school was then managed by the United Congregational Church of Southern Africa but the government's decision resulted in the loss of some dedicated members of staff. This move when combined with the diminishing charitable donations from abroad put the school on the brink of closure. The school was saved initially by the intervention of its own alumni who took the school back into private ownership.

== Today ==
Inanda was one of six schools identified as a historic school in 2007. This number has now grown to ten schools which have been identified because they have played an important part in South Africa's history.

The school still has a daily service and the academic record is that 70% of girls who leave the school go on to further education.

== Notable alumnae ==
=== Education and arts ===
- Bongiwe Dhlomo-Mautloa
- Nokutela Dube
- Pumla Gobodo-Madikizela
- Lauretta Ngcobo
- Joyce Sikakane

=== Politics and unionism ===
- Nokukhanya Bhengu
- Nomalungelo Gina
- Nozizwe Madlala-Routledge
- Baleka Mbete
- Mary Mdziniso
- Bertha Mkhize
- Lucy Mvubelo
- Beatrice Ngcobo
- Eileen Nkosi-Shandu
- Manto Tshabalala-Msimang

=== Business and professions ===
- Vida Mungwira
- Nonkululeko Nyembezi-Heita
- Thandi Orleyn
