= Predikant =

Minister in Dutch Reformed Church

Predikant is a minister in the Dutch Reformed Church, especially in South Africa; predikant is the Afrikaans term for 'pastor'.

The word predikant is also used in Dutch, West Frisian, Norwegian, and Swedish.
