= Nonkululeko Nyembezi-Heita =

South African engineer, businesswoman and corporates executive

Nonkululeko Nyembezi
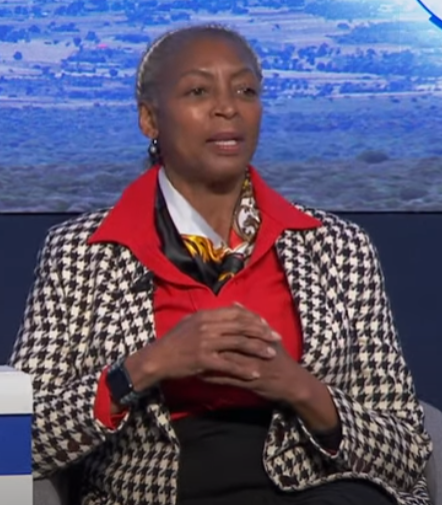
- Speaking at the 2023 World Economic Forum
- Born: 22 March 1960 (age 66); Pietermaritzburg, South Africa
- Education: University of Manchester Institute of Science and Technology (Bachelor of Science in Electrical Engineering); California Institute of Technology (Master of Science in Electrical Engineering); Open University Business School (Master of Business Administration)
- Occupations: Engineer, Businesswoman & Corporate Executive
- Years active: 1980 — present
- Title: Chairperson of Standard Bank Group and Standard Bank of South Africa.

Nonkululeko Merina Cheryl Nyembezi-Heita, also Nku (born 22 March 1960), is a South African engineer, businesswoman and corporate executive who was appointed Chairperson-designate at Standard Bank Group and Standard Bank of South Africa, on 10 May 2022. She assumed office on 1 June 2022, replacing Thulani Gcabashe, who retired on 31 May 2022, and became the bank's first Black female chairman. She has been active in steel, telecommunications and finance. Since March 2014, she has been CEO of the Dutch mining group, IchorCoal N.V.

== Biography ==
Nyembezi was born in Pietermaritzburg, South Africa, to father Aubrey, an attorney and mother Debiya Nyembezi, a nurse from Pietermaritzburg. She has an older brother (Manqoba Nyembezi) and a younger sister (Nontando Nyembezi). Brought up in a Methodist family, she attended a Bantu primary school in Clermont, KwaZulu-Natal, before embarking on her secondary school education at Inanda Seminary School near Durban. She obtained exceptionally good results in science and maths, becoming the top student in South Africa in her Junior Certificate year. After receiving her Senior Certificate, she was awarded an Awarded Anglo American Corporation Open Scholarship.

She went on to graduate in electrical engineering at the University of Manchester Institute of Science and Technology and earned a Master of Science degree from the California Institute of Technology. She also has an MBA from the Open University Business School. In 2018, she was appointed the Chancellor of the Durban University of Technology.

Her first job was as an engineer at IBM's Research Triangle Park in Raleigh, North Carolina. After working in various positions with IBM in the United States, she moved to South Africa. In 1998, she joined Alliance Capital Management where she headed financial services, and later was recruited by Vodacom as the Chief Officer of Mergers and Acquisitions. In 2008, she was appointed executive director of ArcelorMittal South Africa, Africa's largest steelmaker, where she remained for six years. In 2009, she joined the board of the Johannesburg Stock Exchange Limited. In late 2013, she was appointed non-executive chair of the JSE.

In March 2014, she joined the Dutch mining group IchorCoal as CEO. She served there up until June 2020.

Among her other appointments, Nyembezi-Heita has also served on the boards of Anglo American plc and is the independent non-executive chairman of Macsteel Service Centres South Africa (Pty) Ltd.

In November 2017, she was appointed chair of Alexander Forbes Board. She became the first female chair in the company's 82-year history. Her appointment followed the withdrawal of former KPMG SA CEO Moses Kgosana who was accused of involvement in the Gupta family scandal.

In May 2022, she was appointed chair of Standard Bank, becoming the bank's first Black female chairman.

== Recognition ==
In 2012, Nyembezi was listed 97th in Forbes list of The World's 100 Most Powerful Women.

In 2024, Forbes listed her in its 50 over 50 list.
