= Gottlieb Wilhelm Anthonie van der Lingen =

South African minister

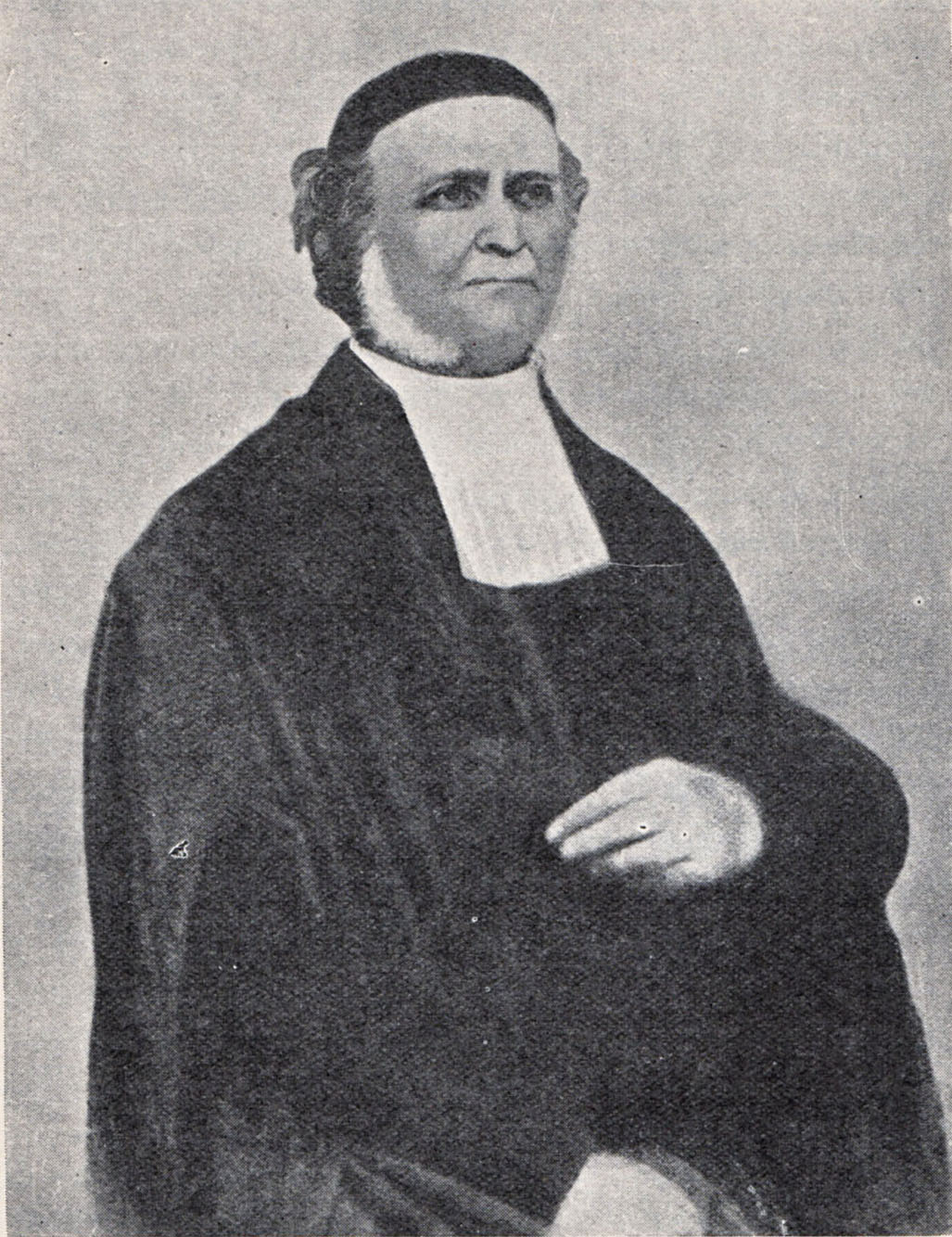
- Born: Gottlieb Wilhelm Anthonie van der Lingen; 29 May 1804; Cape Town, South Africa
- Died: November 7, 1869 (aged 65); Paarl, South Africa
- Occupation: Minister
- Writing career
- Language: Dutch, Afrikaans

Gottlieb Wilhelm Anthonie van der Lingen (29 May 1804 – 7 November 1869) was the founder of the famous Paarl Gymnasium.

He left in 1818 with his brother Juan Anthonie Pienaar and his parents for the Netherlands where in 1822 he became a student in literature and philosophy at the University of Utrecht.

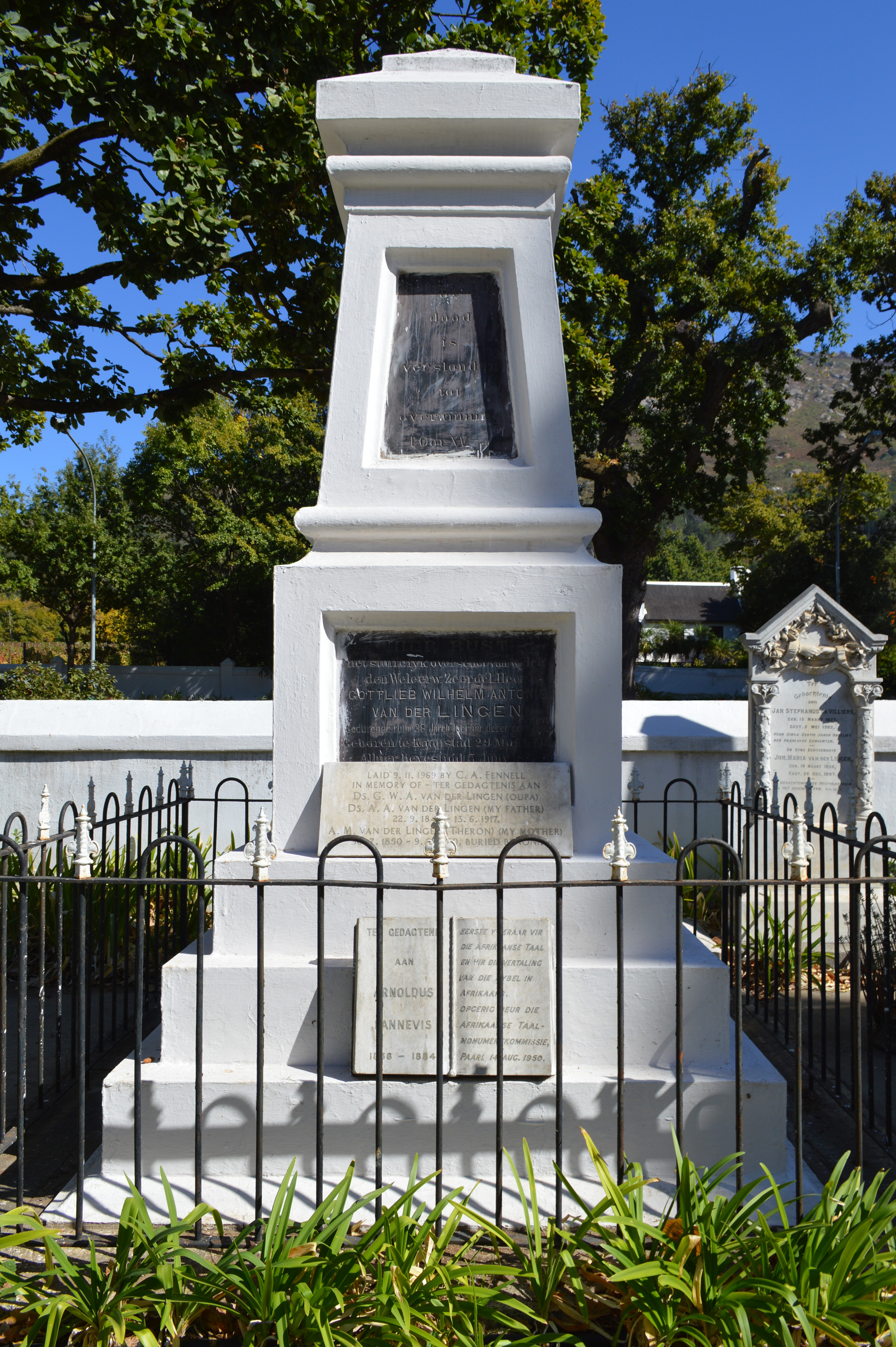
Gravestone of van der Lingen in Paarl.

In 1831 he returned to South Africa and was confirmed as pastor of the Strooidakkerk in Paarl by Rev. Abraham Faure. Nine years later he had to temporarily stop his work for health reasons, but later returned. In 1842 he gained fame with his sermons on the prophecies and published Aanwijsingen betreffende de Afkomst en Bestemming van sommige Noordsche Volken.

In 1849 he campaigned for the establishment of a church newspaper in Dutch, as a result of which De Gereformeerde Kerkbode was established. He also campaigned for the establishment of a theological seminary in Stellenbosch, but declined the professorship offered to him. In 1858 he founded the Paarl Gymnasium, which was to serve as a counterweight to the English state schools.

== Sources ==
- Albertyn, dr. C.F. (hoofred.), Afrikaanse Kinderensiklopedie (derde uitgawe), Nasou, Kaapstad, (jaartal onbekend).
