= Daniel Lindley =

American missionary in South Africa (1801–1880)

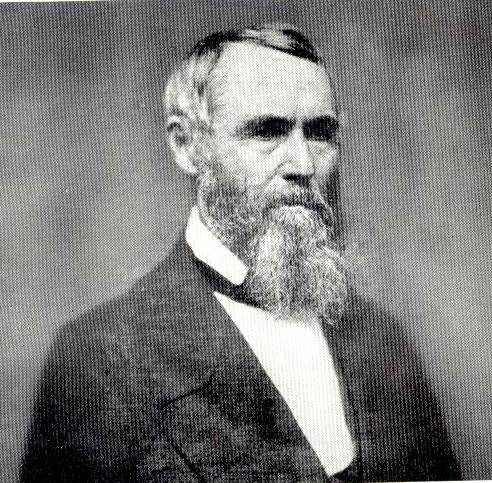
- Lindley
- Born: August 24, 1801; Ten Mile Creek, Pennsylvania
- Died: September 3, 1880 (aged 79); Morristown, New Jersey
- Education: Ohio University
- Occupation: Missionary
- Spouse: Lucy Lindley
- Children: Eleven

Daniel Lindley (August 24, 1801 – September 3, 1880) was an American missionary in South Africa. He and his wife Lucy founded the Inanda Seminary School in 1869. Lindley was pastor to the first Dutch Reformed Church in the Orange Free State. He was a pastor to the Voortrekkers.

== Description ==
Lindley was born at Ten Mile Creek, Pennsylvania, on 24 August 1801. He was the eldest child of Jacob and Hannah Lindley. His father had founded Ohio University so not surprisingly Lindley was educated there and at the Union Seminary in Prince Edward, Virginia. In 1831 he was ordained by the Presbyterian Church. On 20 November 1834 he married Lucy Virginia Allen and they were sent by the American Board of Missions to South Africa. His colleagues on board the Burlington were the medical doctors Newton Adams, Alexander Erwin Wilson, three other missionaries and their wives.

When they arrived in Cape Town they still had 1,000 miles (1,600 km) to cover. Their journey in the company of Alexander Wilson, Henry Venable and their wives took a year by ox cart to get to Matabeleland. Lindley together with other missionaries were to work creating converts amongst the Matabele but their plan was thwarted by the fighting that was taking place between the Dutch and the Matebele. They had to retreat to Natal and from there they were driven away again by the fighting between the Boers and the Zulus.

In 1839 Lindley returned and decided that with the Zulus out of reach he should minister to the Boers. He opened a school for their children and was appointed as a pastor. On 31 March 1842, Lindley led the founding congregation of the first Dutch Reformed Church in the Orange Free State. These institutions were successful, and amongst the first to be confirmed was Paul Kruger, who was to be the first president of South Africa.

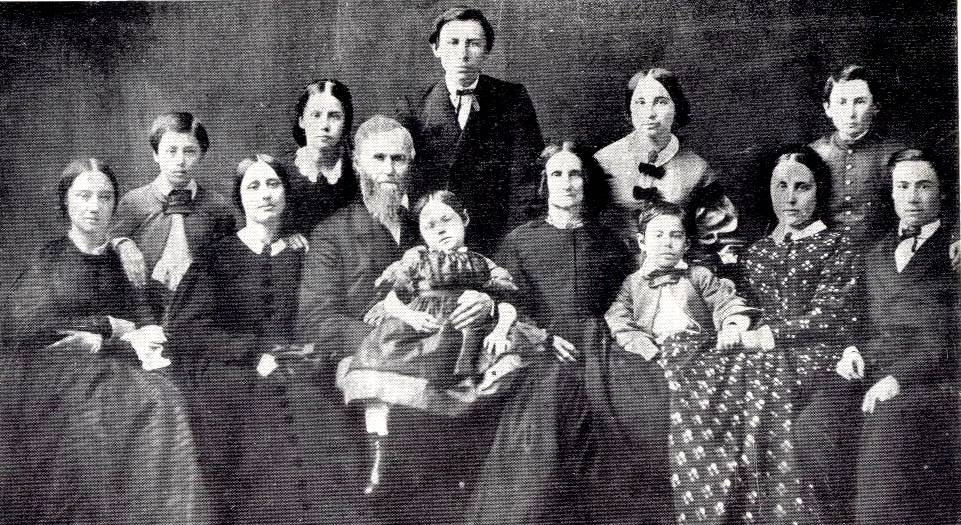
The Lindley family (from L to R): Sarah Adams, James Bryant, Mary Elizabeth, Lucy Virginia, Rev. Daniel Lindley, Clara Louise (in arms), Newton Adams (standing), Mrs. Lucy (Allen) Lindley, Martha Jane, Charles Lutellus (boy), Charlotte Hannah, John and Daniel Allen. In Rochester, New York about 1861.

In 1847, Lindley established a station at Inanda, centering his efforts on the Zulus and helping set aside large "native locations" to protect them from land-hungry settlers.

Lindley moved to the Inanda Mission in 1858 with his wife and eleven children. Lindley fired his own bricks to build the mission house which is still standing over 150 years later. The following June Lindley was able to return to the United States. The family returned in October 1862 leaving their third child Sarah behind to take up a position teaching in Rochester, New York. They were away during the American Civil War and whilst they were in Africa their home was razed to the ground.

At the Lindleys' retirement in 1873, Zulus and Boers expressed deep regard. The Lindleys retired to the United States in 1874. Lindley died on 3 September 1880 in Morristown, New Jersey. He was buried in the Sleepy Hollow Cemetery in New York.

== School for girls ==
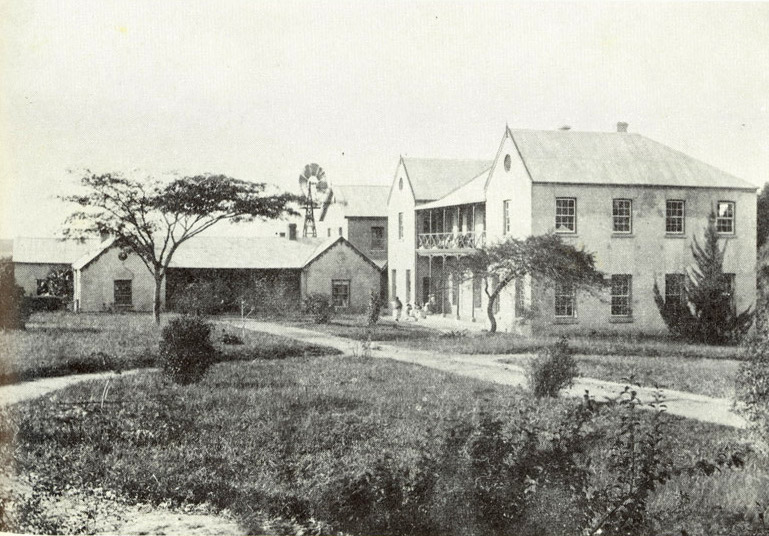
The Seminary. The building that Lindley first built is on the left. The later Edwards Hall is to the right with Lucy Lindley Hall in the background.

In 1869 they realised that the Adams School at Adams Mission was successfully creating educated Africans but they had no prospect of finding an educated local wife. They said "who are they going to marry? – these naked girls". The couple realised this was a problem and founded a school for nineteen girls boarding at Inanda in 1869. The cost of this was borne by the American Missionary Board. The headteacher was brought from Ohio and Mary Kelly Edwards was to serve the school until her death 58 years later.

One of the Lindley daughters went on teach at the school but the Lindley family left in April 1873 leaving the organisation that they had established in the hands of the Reverend James Dube. Dube was the son of one of the first Christians in the area. Dube was to die in 1877 but not before he had fathered John Dube who was to found Ohlange High School and take a leading role in creating the African National Congress. Lindley left Inanda having created what would become Inanda Seminary School, the Seminary, a church and several schools based in native huts.

== Legacy ==
The mission house that Lindley built at the Inanda Mission is still standing and is still used as the main office at the Seminary. Lindley and his wife's major contribution was to establish the school for girls. The Inanda Seminary School is still running and has a good record and noted alumni. In addition, the town of Lindley in the Free State is named after him. A bridge in Pietermaritzburg was named the Daniel Lindley Bridge in 1967.
