= Winburg =

Farming town in Free State, South Africa

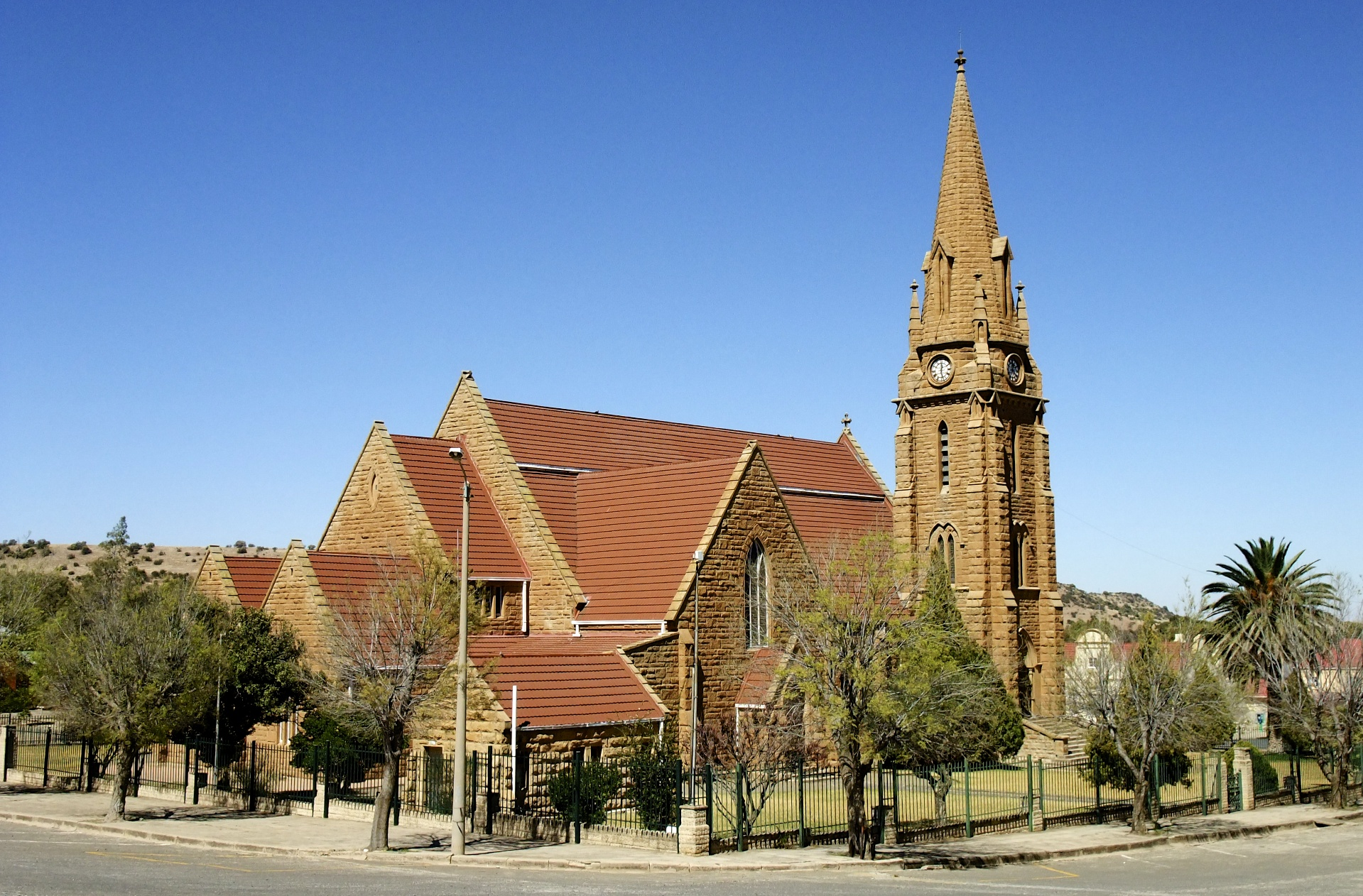
- Dutch Reformed Church, Winburg

- Location within Free State (South African province) Location within South Africa
- Coordinates: 28°31′00″S 27°00′36″E
- Country: South Africa
- Province: Free State
- District: Lejweleputswa
- Municipality: Masilonyana
- Established: 1835

Area
  - Total: 63.5 km^{2} (24.5 sq mi)
- Elevation: 1,430 m (4,690 ft)

Population (2011)
  - Total: 1,373
  - Density: 21.6/km^{2} (56.0/sq mi)

Racial makeup (2011)
  - Black African: 41.0%
  - Coloured: 3.0%
  - Indian/Asian: 1.0%
  - White: 52.8%
  - Other: 2.2%

First languages (2011)
  - Afrikaans: 68.9%
  - Sotho: 15.8%
  - English: 8.0%
  - Xhosa: 2.3%
  - Other: 5.0%
- Time zone: UTC+2 (SAST)
- Postal code (street): 9420
- PO box: 9420
- Area code: +27 (0)51

Winburg is a small mixed farming town in the Free State province of South Africa.

It is the oldest proclaimed town (1837) in the Orange Free State, South Africa and along with Griekwastad, is one of the oldest settlements in South Africa located north of the Orange River.

It is situated where the N1 national highway (which goes north to Johannesburg and south to Bloemfontein and Cape Town) meets the N5 national route (which goes east to Qwa Qwa & Harrismith). The nearest city, Bloemfontein, is 120 km to the south.

== History ==
A small group of 11 Voortrekker settlers, led by Andries Hendrik Potgieter, first arrived in the area of Winburg in 1835.

They were able to buy access to the land between the Vaal and Vet rivers – virtually the entire northern part of what is now the Free State – from the local Bataung Chief, Makwana, in 1836, by promising protection from rival tribes and offering 42 head of cattle.

Within a year, more than 1,000 settler families had gathered in the region, making the need for an administrative and religious centre urgent. But the Voortrekker leaders disagreed over where to establish such a town. In 1841 a vote was held, with Andries Pretorius's group winning and electing to establish the town in its current position, on what was then the farm Waaifontein ("windy spring"), owned by Jacobus de Beer. Legend has it that the new town was named Winburg ("victory town") to commemorate this, and holds that the site nominated by the losers is today still called Mompeling ("muttering"). Alternative explanations suggest the name commemorates the 1837 Voortrekker victory over the Ndebele.

Prior to 1843 Winburg formed part of the Boer Republic of Natalia (Port Natal, Pietermaritzburg). Following the British annexation of Natal in 1843, Winburg became the first capital of the Voortrekker republic of the Orange Free State. Winburg was granted municipal status in 1872, by which time the capital had been moved to Bloemfontein. Winburg continued, however, to act as a settlement and religious centre for the local settlers.

The town was originally selected as the site for the main Voortrekker Monument, but Pretoria won favour and a five-tiered secondary Voortrekker monument was built on the outskirts of Winburg instead in the 1950s. It carries the names of the Voortrekker leaders: Piet Uys, Andries Hendrik Potgieter, Andries Pretorius, Piet Retief and Gerrit Maritz. The lengths of the five tiers are proportional to the distances travelled by the respective settler groups. The monument is built near the site of the birth-house of Martinus Theunis Steyn, who was president of the Boer Republic of the Orange Free State.

== Second Boer War ==
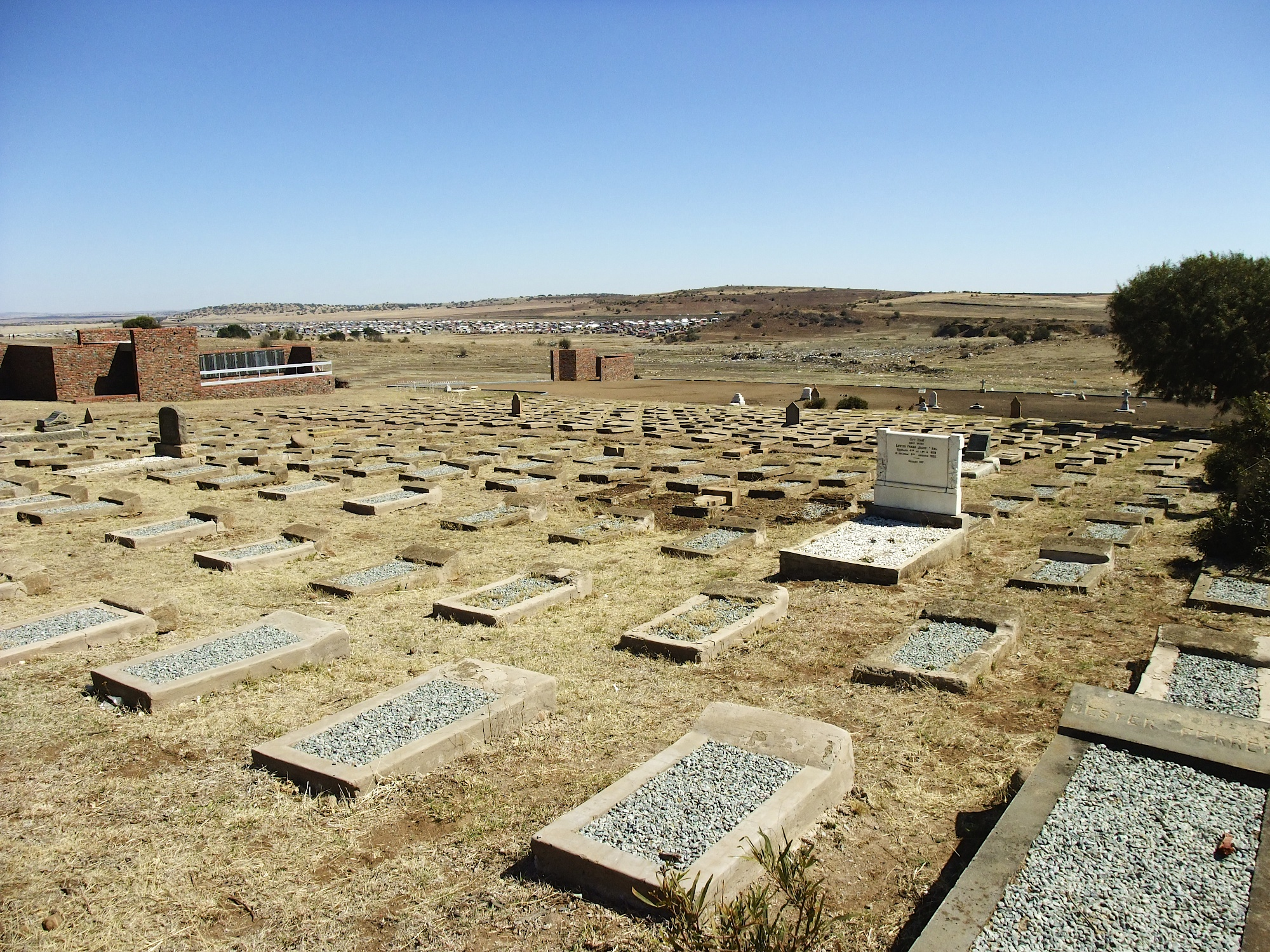
The cemetery of the concentration camp in Winburg

During the Second Boer War, the British established a concentration camp in Winburg for Afrikaner civilians, primarily women and children, who were captured in the Boer republics by British forces as part of a scorched earth campaign. 132 adults and 355 children died in the camp during the war due to a combination of malnutrition and infectious disease, exacerbated by the fact that they were kept in tents which did not offer protection from winter conditions. Blacks were also housed at a nearby camp which was called "Balla Bosiu", meaning where they cry at night.

Koos de la Rey, a famous commander of the Boer commandos, was born near Winburg on a farm called Doornfontein. De la Rey served as a general of the Boer commandos in the Western Transvaal against British forces in the region from 1899 to 1901. A Black military unit which fought on the side of the British was also raised in Winburg during the war.

== Local politics ==
The first shots of the Maritz Rebellion in 1914, against the government's involvement in South West Africa, were fired in the district of Winburg.

The first President of the Republic of South Africa, when it gained independence from the United Kingdom in 1961, was Charles Robberts Swart, who was born and went to school in Winburg.

The white community of Winburg is famous for the differences in political heritage. The town was divided into two camps, due to their support to either the South African Party of General Jan Smuts, or the National Party of Dr Daniel François Malan. This led to the division of the Dutch Reformed Church into two separate congregations, Klip Kerk (Stone Church, because it was built from sandstone) and which was the original church for the Dutch Reformed Church and Rietfontein Kerk. Bitter feuds were fought between supporters of the two parties. The Klipkerk supporters demolished the Rietfontein Church project several times.

In later years this division was almost erased. The National Party's support and later abdication to the African National Congress, led to a new division in the community. Old feuds were re-ignited and with the town divided along religious lines again, a new church, the Afrikaans Protestant Church, was formed.

The communities in Winburg, as in most South African towns, still lead segregated lives, a remnant of apartheid days. Social interaction between different population groups is being encouraged by an official integration policy of the African National Congress government. However this has led to the deteriorations of many facilities in Winburg, of which the previous prestigious school and orphanage, are two examples.

== Notable people ==
- Koloi Lebona

== See also ==
- Eerste Pastorie Winburg
