= 2024 Basadi in Music Awards =

South African music awards

- Sponsored by: SAMPRA
- Date: August 10, 2024
- Venue: Joburg Theatre, Braamfontein
- Country: South Africa
- Hosted by: Unathi Nkayi

Highlights
- Most awards: Tyla and DJ Zinhle (3 each)
- Most nominations: Tyla (5)
- Website: basadiinmusicawards.co.za

Television/radio coverage
- Network: SABC 2

The 2024 Basadi in Music Awards took place on August 10, 2024, at the Joburg Theatre in Braamfontein, Johannesburg to celebrate and honour women's in South African music industry. It was hosted for the second time by actress Unathi Nkayi.

The nominees were announced on May 27. Tyla received the most nominations with 5, followed Lwah Ndlunkulu and DJ Zinhle with four each.

== Winners and nominees ==
Below list are nominees. Winners are listed first in bold face.

Amapiano Artist of the Year	Artist of the Year
**Kamo Mphela – "Dalie" featuring Khalil Harrison, Tyler ICU, and Baby S.O.N**; Bassie – "Izenzo" featuring Aymos; MaWhoo – "Ngilimele" featuring Deep Sen, KingTalkzin and Mthunzi; Nkosazana Daughter – "Amaphutha" featuring Murumba Pitch; Zee Nxumalo – "Thula Mabota" with Pabi Cooper, 031CHOPPA featuring Shakes & Les	**Lwah Ndlunkulu**; Kamo Mphela; Makhadzi; Nomcebo Zikode; Tyla
Best Styled Artist of the Year	Collaboration of the Year
**Thembi Seete**; Kelly Khumalo; Nhlanhla Mafu; Tyla	**DJ Zinhle and Basetsana – "Mdali"**; DJ Pruluv and Boohle – "Ngeke"; DJ Zinhle and Cici – "Thula"; Fezeka Dlamini, Nomfundo Moh, and Naledi – "Uyangijabulisa"
Dance Artist of the Year	DJ of the Year
**Makhadzi – "Mapara"**; Cici – "Mjolo"; Delta The Leo – "Phefumula"; Lady Zamar – "Castles"; Sefa (Ghana) – "Vibration"	**DJ Zinhle**; PRULUV; DJ Tshupi; Happygal; Kmat Dj
Entertainment Journalist of the Year	Entertainment TV Producer of the Year
**Mbalenhle Zuma – Sunday World**; Kaunda Selisho – News24; Keitumetse Maako – News24; Oluthando Keteyi – Independent Media; Qhama Dayile – Zimoja	**Noni Khumalo – Trendz Live**; Anele Mdoda – The Masked Singer; Swazi Dlamini – Church Girls who Rock; Thapelo Mowela – Morning Live; Theresa Wilson – The Sauce
Entertainment Radio Producer of the Year	Entertainment Radio Presenter of the Year
**Nelza Buda – Sibuya Nawe Express Lane (IKwekwezi FM)**; Lettie Dube – The Royal Playground (Radio 2000); Masego Tlhakanye – Weekend breakfast (5FM); Miss Dimples – The Cruise Connection (KCA Radio); Noni Khumalo – The Lunch League (YFM)	**Mroza Buthelezi – Vuka Afrika Breakfast Show (Ukhozi FM)**; Catherine Mahamo – The Opulant Life (Oppulance Radio); Lebo Maoela – Rea Thella 3-6 (Lesedi FM); Lethabo Lejoy Mathatho – Monate; Breakfast Show (Thobela FM); Mpumi Mlambo – The Encore (Metro FM)
Gospel Artist of the Year	Hip Hop Artist of the Year
**Zaza Mokhethi – "Shabach shofar Chronicles"**; Londiwe Ka Masondo Cele – "Ukhona La"; Nomandla Sandra – "Egameni"; Snezeiy – "Izulu (Live)"; Xolly Mncwango – "Umuhle baba (Live at Cedawoods of Sandton, 2023)"	**Dyna Steez – "Nomalanga"**; Dope Saint Jude – "Why Not"; Faith K – "Qosh"; Fifi Cooper – "Running"; Nadia Nakai – "Never Leave"
Jazz Artist of the Year	Music Video of the Year
**Salphina Kadiaka – "Tompie"**; AusTebza – "Mmangwane"; Bokang Ramatlapeng – "The Waters"; Qaqamba Ntshinka – "Zizinja"; Thandi Ntuli – "Nomayoyo (Ingoma ka Mkhulu)"	**Kamo Mphela– "Dalie" featuring Khalil Harrison, Tyler ICU, Baby S.O.N**; DJ Zinhle and Cici – "Thula"; Kelly Khumalo – "Emaweni"; Lwah Ndlunkulu – "Ngiyathandaza"; Tyla – "Water"
Music TV Show Presenter of the Year	Newcomer of the Year
**Robyn Nakaambo (Namibia) - WhataLifestyle NBC**; Candice Modiselle – Beatz and Rhymes - Season 1 BET Africa; Nomalanga Shozi – The Sauce SABC 1; Bontle Modiselle – Clash of the Choirs Mzansi Magic; Shamiso Mosaka – Newsish MTV Base	**Nontokozo Mkhize – "Moyongcwele"**; DJ Tshegu – "Mzokwana" featuring Sims and Noreng; MeloBeGreat – "Naledi"; Nano Mothibi – "Bazobuya"; Peekay Gavu – "Zahlanzwa"
Pop Artist of the Year	Reggae Artist of the Year
**Shekhinah – "Risk" featuring Moliy**; Filah Lah lah – "Past Myself"; Namakau Star – "Every Day"; Pixie Whip – "Feel it"; Tyla – "Water"	**Reign Afrika – Hush**; Dimahr – Ramasedi; Sanki Fayauman – Sthandwa Sami; Undefynd Musiq – Bill pile op; Zama Sunshine – Give Me You
Sofnfree Afropop Artist of the Year	Song of the Year
**Naledi Aphiwe – "Ngiyabonga"**; Ikhona – "Andina Nto"; Kelly Khumalo – "Emaweni"; Lwah Ndlunkulu – "Eyam"; Zamo (Kingdom of Eswatini) – "Lendlela"	**"Water" – Tyla**; "Dalie" – Kamo Mphela featuring Khalil Harrison Tyler ICU & Baby S.O.N; Eyami – Lwah Ndlunkulu; Izenzo – Bassie & Aymos; Ngiyabonga – Naledi Aphiwe
Songwriter of the Year	Traditional Artist of the Year
**Brenda Mtambo – "Bhaluyacima"**; Buhlebendalo – "iLembe"; Cici – "Mjolo"; Londiwe Kamasondo Cele – "cUkhona La"; Makhadzi – "Mapara"	**Pleasure Tsa Manyalo – "Makoti Take 5"**; Buhlebendalo – "iLembe"; Esther Mphahlele – "Moratiwa"; Jessica Mbangeni – "Latshonilaga"; NTUNJA – "Buya"

== Special awards ==
Non-voting category recipients

=== CEO Mosadi In Business Achievement Award Recipients ===
- Lady Du
- Zamo

=== The Lifetime Achievement Recipients ===
- Mercy Pakela
- Linah Ebony Ngcobo

=== Trailblazer Award Recipient ===
- DJ Zinhle

=== International Achievement Award ===
- Makhadzi and Tyla

=== Spar Humanitarian Award Recipient ===
- Mme Matshidiso Sekuwe

=== Highest Airplay ===
- "Water" – Tyla

=== Capasso Most Streamed Song ===
- "Ngiyeza" - Lwah Ndlunkulu
