= Metro FM Music Award for Song of the Year =

South African annual music award

Metro FM Award for Song of the Year
- Sponsored by: Metro FM
- Country: South Africa
- Presented by: Metro FM Music Awards
- First award: 2006
- Currently held by: Kabza de Small & Mthunzi – "Imithandazo" (2024)

Highlights
- First awarded to: Teargas – "Chances" (2006)
- Website: https://www.metrofmmusicawards.co.za/

The Metro FM Music Award for Song of the Year, is the main award of the Metro FM Music Awards. It was first awarded in 2006 and it has been given out annually ever since, the award contains numerous nominations as compared to other categories every ceremony.

The award was first received by the South African musical trio Teargas for "Chances" in 2006.

== 2000s ==
Year	Winner	Nominations
2006	Teargas - "Chance"	Revolution - "Light of my Life"; Kabelo - "Dubula"

== 2010s ==
Year	Winner	Nominations
2016	Nathi - "Nomvula"	Black Coffee - We Dance Again; Nathi - Nomvula; DJ Spechtacula & DJ Naves - Kings of the Weekend Anthem; Durban Nyts - Shumaya; Heavy-K - Umoya; DJ Ganyani - Talk to Me; Prince Kaybee - Wajelwa; Riky Rick - Boss Zonke; Prince Kaybee - Better Days; DJ Shimza - Akulalwa

== 2020s ==
The winner of the 2024 Metro FM Music Award for Song of the Year walks away with R150.000, courtesy of The Motsepe Foundation.

Year	Winner	Nominations
2023	Betusile Mcinga – "Ngena Noah"	AKA & Nasty C - Lemons (Lemonade); K.O - SETE feat. Young Stunna & Blxckie; Big Nuz - Ngeke feat. DJ Yamza; Kabza de Small - Khusela feat. Msaki; Konke & Musa Keys - Kincane; Bethusile Mcinga - Ngena Noah; Gaba Cannal - Healer Ntliziyo Yam feat. George Lesley & Russel Zuma; Sjava - Isoka feat. Q Twins & Mzukulu; Aymos & Ami Faku - Fatela; Wanitwa Mos - Sofa Silahlane feat. Master KG, Nkosazana Daughter & Lowsheen
2024	Kabza de Small & Mthunzi – "Imithandazo" feat. DJ Maphorisa, Young Stunna, Sizwe Alakine & Umthakathi Kush	Oscar Mbo & KG Smallz – "Yes God" feat. Dearson, Mörda & Mhaw Keys (Mhaw Keys remix); DJ Kent – "Horns in the Sun" feat. MoT & Brenden Praise, Mörda, Thakzin (Thakzin remix); Kamo Mphela – "Dalie" feat. Baby S.ON, Tyler ICU & Khalil Harrison; Tyla – "Water"; Kabza de Small & Mthunzi – "Imithandazo" feat. DJ Maphorisa, Young Stunna, Sizwe Alakine & Umthakathi Kush; Dlala Thukzin – "iPlan" feat. Zaba & Sykes; Tyler ICU – "Mnike" feat. DJ Maphorisa, Nandipha808, Ceeka RSA & Tyron Dee; Bassie & Aymos – "Izenzo" feat. T-Man SA; De Mthuda & Da Muziqal Chef – "Sgudi Snyc" feat. Eemoh & Sipho Magudulela; DJ Stokie – Masithokoze feat. Eemoh
