= Vigro Deep =

South African DJ and music producer

- Born: Kamogelo Phetla; 6 September 2001 (age 24); Atteridgeville, Pretoria, South Africa
- Occupations: DJ; pianist; record producer
- Years active: 2017–present
- Awards: Full list
- Musical career
- Genres: Amapiano; EDM; deep house
- Instruments: DAW; sampler; piano; turntables
- Labels: Kalawa Jazmee; Sony Music

Kamogelo Phetla (born 6 September 2001) is a South African DJ and record producer professionally known as Vigro Deep. He is one of the amapiano pioneering DJs.

== Early life and career ==
Kamogelo Phetla is a South African DJ and record producer. He was born and raised in Atteridgeville, Pretoria, on 6 September 2001. He got into music with the goal of becoming a rapper. He was inspired by his father, Victor Ngcongwana (DJ Spring), who is one of the Godfathers of Deep House.

Vigro Deep dropped out of high school in grade 10 to pursue a career in music production. He is one of the amapiano pioneering DJs. His singles, "Blue Monday" and "Africa Rise", were certified gold by the Recording Industry of South Africa. "Wishi Wishi" with DJ Maphorisa and Kabza de Small featuring Scotts Maphuma and Young Stunna, reached number one on the Official South African Charts,

== Accolades ==
Award	Year (Note: Indicates the year of ceremony. Each year is linked to the article about the awards held that year, wherever possible.)	Category	Recipient(s) or nominee(s)	Result	Ref.
African Muzik Magazine Awards	2021	Best Collaboration	"Ke Star" (Remix) (with Focalistic and Davido)	Won	
South African Amapiano Awards	2021	Best Amapiano Music Video	"Ke Star" (with Focalistic)	Nominated	
South African Music Awards	2020	Best Produced Album	Scorpion Kings (with Kabza de Small and DJ Maphorisa)	Won	
South African Music Awards	2020	Best Produced Album	Isphithiphithi (with Kabza de Small, DJ Maphorisa and Samthing Soweto)	Nominated	
South African Music Awards	2020	Best Kwaito/Gqom/Amapiano	Baby Boy III	Nominated	
South African Music Awards	2021	Music Video of the Year	"Ke Star" (with Focalistic)	Nominated	
