= Uzozisola =

2021 song by Mas Musiq

"Uzozisola" is an amapiano lead single by South African DJ and record producer Mas Musiq from his third studio album Aut' eSharp (2021) released on 24 September 2021 through New Money Gang under exclusive license from Sony Music Entertainment Africa, it features guest appearances from singer Aymos and record producers Kabza de Small and DJ Maphorisa.

The single was certified double platinum by the Recording Industry of South Africa (RiSA) and peaked at number 6 on The Official South African Charts.

== Charts ==
Chart performance for "Uzozisola"
Chart (2021)	Peak position
South Africa (TOSAC)	6

== Certifications ==
Region	Certification	Certified units/sales
South Africa (RISA)	2× Platinum	40,000^{‡}
^{‡} Sales+streaming figures based on certification alone.
