= KOA II Part 1 =

Studio album by Kabza De Small
- Released: June 16, 2022
- Genre: Amapiano
- Length: 2:11:25
- Label: Piano Hub
- Producer: Kabelo Motha; Keith Mduduzi; Tsholofelo Mokhine; Tshepo Bure; Zethu Mashika; Themba Sekowe; George Lesley; Sandile Masebe

Kabza De Small chronology
I Am the King of Amapiano: Sweet & Dust (2020)	KOA II Part 1 (2022)

KOA II Part 1 (pronounced King of Amapiano 2 Part 1) is the fourth studio album by South African DJ Kabza De Small, released on June 16, 2022, through Piano Hub. The album features guest appearances from DJ Maphorisa, Ami Faku, Msaki, Young Stunna, Kwesta, Bob Mabena, Mhaw Keys and more.

== Background ==
In an interview with Spotify, Motha revealed that he worked on 81 songs before coming to a final 18 tracks to be included on his fourth album.

== Critical reception ==
At GQ Magazine, the album received scored 10/10 rating.

== Commercial performance ==
On May 30, 2022, album's pre-add were made available and debuted number 11 on iTunes top 100 chart.

=== Accolades ===
The album was nominated for Album of the Year at 2022 Afrimma and scored three nominations at the 2nd Annual South African Amapiano Music Awards Best Amapiano Album/EP, Best Amapiano Produced Song, and Song of the Year. KOA II Part 1 is nominated for Best Dance Album at South African Dance Music Awards.

Year	Nominee / work	Award	Result
2022	KOA II Part 1	Album of the Year	Nominated
2023	KOA II Part 1	Best Amapiano Album/Ep	Pending
2023	"Khusela" featuring Msaki	Best Amapiano Produced Song	Pending
2023	"Khusela" featuring Msaki	Song of the Year	Pending
2023	KOA II Part 1	Best Dance Album.	Pending

== Track listing ==
Standard Edition
No.	Title	Writer(s)	Producer(s)	Length
1.	"Khusela" (featuring Msaki)	Asanda Mvana	Kabelo Motha	8:21
2.	"Ingabe" (featuring Spartz)	Spartz Mothlamme	Kabelo Motha	6:44
3.	"Eningi" (featuring Njelic, Simmy, Mhaw Keys)	Tshwarelo Albert Motlhako; Simphiwe Majobe Nhlangulela	Kabelo Motha; Mohau David Matlaletsa	6:47
4.	"Ubumnandi" (featuring Nia Pearl, MDU aka TRP)	Peleka Lwana	Kabelo Motha; Keith Mduduzi Mangena	6:24
5.	"Xola" (featuring Nobuhle, Zethu, Young Stunna)	Sandile Fortune Msimango	Kabelo Motha	7:30
6.	"Sondela" (featuring Ami Faku, Mhaw Keys)	Amanda Faku	Kabelo Motha; Mohau David Matlaletsa	8:14
7.	"Bathini" (featuring Young Stunna, Artwork Sounds)	Sandile Fortune Msimango	Kabelo Motha; Rofhiwa Samuel Ndou; George Leslie	7:57
8.	"Az'khale" (featuring Daliwonga)	Daliwonga Matiwane	Kabelo Motha	7:13
9.	"Isoka" (featuring Nkosazana Daughter, Murumba Pitch)	Nolwazi Nzama; Inoocent Thabang Mangolo; Emmanuel Nanga Mathye	Kabelo Motha	7:30
10.	"Ngyamthanda" (featuring Nicole Elocin, Phila Dlozi, Da Muziqal Chef)	Nicole Chigariro; Philadlozi Mfekayi	Kabelo Motha; Tshepo Bure	6:51
11.	"Rekere 2" (featuring Stakev)		Kabelo Motha; Kelvin Tebogo Khumalo	7:35
12.	"Mutserendende" (featuring Mr Brown, Jon Delinger, Da Muziqal Chef)	Jon Delinger; Mr Brown	Kabelo Motha; Tshepo Bure	6:56
13.	"Skeem Saam" (featuring Ami Faku)	Amanda Faku	Kabelo Motha	6:56
14.	"Bawo" (featuring Nobuhle, Yallunder)	Nobuhle; Yolanda Nyembezi	Kabelo Motha	7:15
15.	"Khuluma Imali" (featuring Madumane, Toss, Felo Le Tee)	Pholoso Masombuka	Kabelo Motha; Themba Sekowe; Tsholofelo Mokhine	6:56
16.	"Bayasaba" (featuring Daliwonga, Young Stunna)	Sandile Fortune Msimango; Daliwonga Matiwane	Kabelo Motha; Themba Sekowe	7:30
17.	"Mshini" (featuring Lady Du, Young Stunna, Bob Mabena, Kwesta)	Sandile Fortune Msimango; Duduzile Ngwenya; Senzo Vilakazi; Bob Mabena	Kabelo Motha	7:16
18.	"Liyangishonela" (featuring Nobuhle)	Nobuhle	Kabelo Motha	7:30
Total length:				2:11:25

== Release and singles ==
The albums standard edition was released on June 16, 2022.

"Khusela" featuring Msaki was released on May 31, 2021, as album's lead single. The song debuted number 1 on Apple Music charts.

The other singles "Bathini" featuring Young Stunna and Artwork Sounds, and "Isoka" featuring Nkosazana Daughter and Murumba Pitch "Ingabe", "Eningi" featuring Njelic, Simmy and Mhaw Keys were also released on May 31, 2021.

== Release history ==
Release dates and formats for KOA II Part 1
Region	Date	Format(s)	Edition(s)	Label	Ref.
South Africa	16 June 2022	Digital download; streaming	Standard	Piano Hub	
