= I Am the King of Amapiano: Sweet & Dust =

Studio album by Kabza de Small
- Released: June 26, 2020
- Genre: Amapiano
- Length: 3:57:00
- Label: Piano Hub
- Producer: Kabelo Motha

Kabza de Small chronology
I Am the King of Amapiano: Sweet & Dust (2020)	KOA II Part 1 (2022)

I Am the King of Amapiano: Sweet & Dust is a third solo studio album by South African DJ Kabza de Small, released through Piano Hub on June 26, 2020.

== Critical reception ==
Professional ratings
Review scores
Source	Rating
AllMusic	10/10 stars

I Am the King of Amapiano: Sweet & Dust received generally positive reviews from music critics.

The Native Mag wrote; "I Am the King of Amapiano: Sweet & Dust is a terrific front-to-back album that serves as a resounding statement of Kabza’s undeniable powers, and it immediately stands as a creative milestone for the entire subgenre".

== Commercial performance ==
Up its release I Am the King of Amapiano: Sweet & Dust debuted on Apple's Top 30 Album and surpassed over 8 million streams.

The album peaked at number one on Spotify's Most streamed South African albums in South Africa.

In addition, the album was certified double platinum in South Africa with over 13 million streams.

=== Industry awards ===
Year	Nominee / work	Award	Result	Ref.
2021	I Am the King of Amapiano: Sweet & Dust	Album of the Year	Nominated	
2021	I Am the King of Amapiano: Sweet & Dust	Best Amapiano Album	Nominated	
2021	I Am the King of Amapiano: Sweet & Dust	Male Artist of the Year	Won	

== Music ==
The standard edition of I Am the King of Amapiano: Sweet & Dust is about a three-hour and fifth seven minutes long, consisting of 27 tracks.

== Track listing ==
Disc 1
No.	Title	Length
1.	"Sthandwa" (featuring Tyler ICU, Nicole Elocin)	5:56
2.	"Buyile" (featuring DJ Maphorisa, Daliwonga, Nia Pearl)	7:21
3.	"Sponono" (featuring DJ Maphorisa, Wizkid, Burna Boy, Cassper Nyovest)	6:35
4.	"Thinking About You" (featuring Mlindo the Vocalist)	7:55
5.	"Nia Lo" (featuring Nia Pearl)	7:04
6.	"Wena" (Daliwonga, Nia Pearl, Howard)	6:30
7.	"Duze" (Samthing Soweto)	6:13
8.	"Need You Tonight" (featuring Wizkid)	6:48
9.	"Ndofaya" (featuring Daliwonga)	7:13
10.	"Indoni Yamanzi" (featuring Daliwonga, Nia Pearl, Bongza)	6:00
11.	"Why Ngikufela" (featuring DJ Maphorisa, Sha Sha)	5:56
12.	"Impilo" (featuring Kelvin Momo, Kopzz Avenue)	8:29
13.	"Mapiano Blues" (featuring Howard, Xolaniguitars)	7:39
14.	"Many Faces" (featuring George Lesley, Earl W Green)	6:51
15.	"Blow My Mind"	8:29

Disc 2
No.	Title	Length
1.	"iLog Drum" (featuring Daliwonga)	7:04
2.	"Masupa" (featuring DJ Maphorisa, Bongza, Focalistic)	5:56
3.	"Ipiano" (featuring Focalistic, Mdu a.k.a TRP)	6:51
4.	"Qula" (featuring Daliwonga, Xolani guitars)	5:25
5.	"Dlala" (featuring Vyno Miller)	7:00
6.	"Dust" (featuring Focalistic, Leehleza)	5:42
7.	"Rabu Chupa" (featuring Focalistic, Vyno Miller, Bontle Smith)	5:08
8.	"Sam Sokolo"	6:47
9.	"Balanc'ise" (featuring Daliwonga)	5:56
10.	"Into Yellow" (featuring Daliwonga)	7:17
11.	"Izolo" (featuring Nia Pearl)	6:13
12.	"Jwaleng" (featuring DJ Buckz)	6:39
Total length:		3:57:00

== Personnel ==
All credits adapted from AllMusic.

- Kopzz Avenue - Featured Artist
- Ayodeji Balogun - Composer
- Austin Kulani Baloyi - Composer
- Bongza - Featured Artist
- Buckz - Featured Artist
- Burna Boy - Featured Artist
- Nicole Tafadzwa Chigariro - Composer
- Kabza De Small - Primary Artist
- Nicole Elocin - Featured Artist
- Focalistic - Featured Artist
- Howard Gomba - Composer
- Earl Green - Featured Artist
- Howard - Featured Artist
- Tyler ICU - Featured Artist
- Leehleza -Featured Artist
- George Lesley - Composer, Featured Artist
- Peleka Lwana - Composer
- Madumane - Featured Artist
- William Makume - Composer
- Mduduzi Keith Mangena - Composer
- Charmaine Mapimbiro - Composer
- DaliWonga Matiwane - Composer
- Samkelo Lelethu Mdolomba - Composer, Featured Artist
- Lindokuhle Mgedezi - Composer
- Vyno Miller - Featured Artist
- Bongani Mlotshwa - Composer
- Kelvin Momo - Featured Artist
- Kabelo Motha - Composer
- Cassper Nyovest - Featured Artist
- Damini Ogulu - Composer
- Nia Pearl - Composer, Featured Artist
- Refiloe Maele Phoolo - Composer
- Obakeng Ramahali - Composer
- Kopano Ramothata - Composer
- Lethabo Sebetso - Composer
- Themba Sekowe - Composer
- Sha Sha - Featured Artist
- Bongani Sikhukhula - Composer
- Xolani Skhosana - Composer
- Bontle Smith - Composer, Featured Artist
- Lindelihle Gladwell Sukazi - Composer
- MDU a.k.a. TRP - Featured Artist
- Mlindo the Vocalist - Featured Artist
- Wizkid - Featured Artist
- DaliWonga - Featured Artist
- Xolaniguitars - Featured Artist

== Certification and sales ==
Region	Certification	Certified units/sales
South Africa (RISA)	2× Platinum	60,000^{‡}
^{‡} Sales+streaming figures based on certification alone.
