= South African Music Award for Best Music Video of the Year =

The South African Music Award for Best Music Video of the Year is one of the categories of the South African Music Awards.

== 2000s ==
Year	Winner	Nominations
2010	Francis Gavin & Jolyon Ellis for Push Me to the Floor performed by The Parlotones	Nicky Campos for Juju performed by Black Coffee ft. Zakes Bantwini; Morgan Dingle for Who Do You Trust performed by Cassette; Nick Roux for Gotta Keep It Going performed by Jozi; Brandon Oelofse for Double Cross performed by Psyfo
2021	Miss Pru DJ - Price to Pay ft. Blaq Diamond, Malome Vector	MFR Souls - Amanikiniki ft. Major League DJz, Kamo Mphela, Bontle Smith; Prince Kaybee - uWrongo ft. Black Motion, Shimza, Ami Faku; Sha Sha - Tender Love ft. DJ Maphorisa & Kabza De Small; Miss Pru - Price to Pay ft. Blaq Diamond, Malome Vector; Master KG - Jerusalema ft. Nomcebo Zikode; Ayanda Jiya - Lover 4 Life ft. Stogie T (Music Video); Malome Vector - Dumelang ft. Blaq Diamond (Music Video); Semi Tee - Gabadiya ft. Kammu Dee, Miano (Official Video); Aubrey Qwana - Molo (Official Music Video) #REMASTEREDINHD; Nasty C - There They Go; Kwesta - Njandini; Elaine - You're the One (Official Music Video) REMASTERED; DJ Maphorisa, Kabza De Small - Lorch ft. Semi Tee, Miano, Kammu Dee; TNS, Skillz - Ayabonga ft. LeSoul (Official Music Video) HD; Sphectacula, DJ Naves - Okokoko ft. Thebe, Unathi (Video); Nasty C - Eazy (Official Music Video) #REMASTEREDINHD; Focalistic - Ke Star ft. Vigro Deep (Official Video); Rouge - One By One ft. AKA; Azana - Your Love (Official Music Video) REMASTERED; Shane Eagle - Paris ft. Nasty C (Music Video)
