= Price to Pay =

2020 single by Miss Pru DJ

Single by Miss Pru DJ featuring Blaq Diamond and Malome Vector
- Released: 8 May 2020
- Genre: Hip hop
- Length: 5:25
- Label: Ambitiouz Entertainment
- Songwriters: Bokang Justice Moleli; Ndumiso Siyabulela Mdletshe; Siphelele Mbongi Dunywa
- Composers: Miss Pru DJ; Malome Vector; Blaq Diamond
- Producers: Ndumiso Siyabulela Mdletshe; Jack Gibson; Daniel Nduwimana

Miss Pru DJ singles chronology
"Sondela" (2019)	"Price to Pay" (2020)	"uHulumeni" (2021)

"Price to Pay" is a single by South African DJ and record producer Miss Pru DJ, it features guest appearances from Blaq Diamond and Malome Vector. The single was released on 8 May 2020 through Ambitiouz Entertainment and has received a South African Music Award in 2021 for Best Music Video of the Year.

== Certifications ==
Region	Certification	Certified units/sales
South Africa (RISA)	2× Platinum	40,000^{‡}
^{‡} Sales+streaming figures based on certification alone.

== Awards and nominations ==
Year	Award ceremony	Category	Recipient/Nominated work	Results	Ref.
2021	South African Music Awards	Best Music Video of the Year	"Price to Pay"	Won	
2021	South African Music Awards	Record of the Year	"Price to Pay"	Nominated	
2020	SAHHA	Song of the Year	"Price to Pay"	Nominated	
