= Abalele =

Single by Kabza de Small, DJ Maphorisa and Ami Faku
- Released: September 17, 2021
- Genre: Amapiano; house music; electronica
- Length: 6:56

Kabza de Small singles chronology
"Umshove" (2018)	"Abalele" (2021)	"Asibe Happy" (2021)

DJ Maphorisa singles chronology
"Abalele" (2021)

Ami Faku singles chronology
"Imali" (2020)	"Abalele" (2021)	"Lala Ngoxolo" (2021)

"Abalele" is a South African amapiano song produced by Kabza de Small and DJ Maphorisa, featuring the vocals of Ami Faku. It was released on September 17, 2021, and became a hit in South Africa, topping the Apple Music charts and becoming the country's fourth most-streamed song of 2021 on Spotify.

NPR described it as "a lover asking for forgiveness, and it's a perfect specimen of amapiano - smooth, chill house beats that build into the genre's signature log drums."

== Accolades ==
Year	Nominee / work	Award	Result	Ref.
2022	"Abalele"	Record of the Year	Nominated	
2022	"Abalele"	Most Streamed Song of the Year	Won	
