= Asibe Happy =

2021 song by DJ Maphorisa, Kabza de Small and Ami Faku

Single by DJ Maphorisa, Kabza de Small and Ami Faku
- Language: Xhosa language
- English title: Let's be Happy
- Released: 12 November 2021
- Genre: Amapiano
- Length: 7:38 (official release); 4:00 (radio edit)
- Label: Piano Hub; SME Africa
- Songwriter: Amanda Faku
- Producers: DJ Maphorisa; Kabza de Small

Kabza de Small singles chronology
"Mystery Lady" (2021)	"Asibe Happy" (2021)	"Siyabonga" (2021)

"Asibe Happy" is a single by South African singer-songwriter Ami Faku and record producers DJ Maphorisa, and Kabza de Small. It was released on 12 November 2021 by Piano Hub under exclusive license from Sony Music Entertainment Africa.

== Awards and nominations ==
List of awards and nominations received by "Asibe Happy"
Year	Award ceremony	Category	Recipient/Nominated work	Results	Ref.
2022	South African Music Awards	Best Music Video of the Year	"Asibe Happy"	Nominated	
2022	South African Music Awards	Record of the Year	"Asibe Happy"	Nominated	

== Charts ==
Chart performance for "Asibe Happy"
Chart (2021)	Peak position
South Africa (TOSAC)	1
South Africa (Billboard)	5
