= Ameni (song) =

2016 single by Miss Pru DJ

Single by Miss Pru DJ featuring Sjava, Emtee, Saudi, Fifi Cooper, A-Reece and B3nchmarQ
- Language: Zulu language; Sesotho; Sepedi; English
- English title: Amen
- Released: 16 April 2016
- Genre: Hip hop
- Length: 6:16
- Label: Ambitiouz Entertainment
- Songwriter(s): Jabulani Hadebe; Mthembeni Ndevu; Refiloe Boingotlo Precious Mooketsi; Lehlogonolo Ronald Mataboge; Phologo Juda Solomon Mataboge; Tebelelo Kgele Mathiba; Anele Mbisha
- Producer(s): Tumelo Thandokuhle Mathebula; Mnqobi Nxumalo; Mthembeni Ndevu; Mfanfuthi Ruff Nkosi

Miss Pru DJ singles chronology
"Phumelela" (2016)	"Ameni" (2016)	"Ugesi" (2016)

Sjava singles chronology
"Ameni" (2016)	"Vura" (2016)

Emtee singles chronology
"Kuze Kuse" (2016)	"Ameni" (2016)	"Ngeke" (2016)

Saudi singles chronology
"Ameni" (2016)	"There She Go" (2016)

Fifi Cooper singles chronology
"Kuze Kuse" (2016)	"Ameni" (2016)	"Ngeke" (2016)

A-Reece singles chronology
"Phumelela" (2016)	"Ameni" (2016)	"Mngani" (2016)

B3nchmarQ singles chronology
"Bonang" (2016)	"Ameni" (2016)	"All on Me" (2016)

Music video
- "Ameni (Official music video)"

Official audio
- "Ameni"

"Ameni" is a single by South African DJ and record producer Miss Pru DJ released on 16 April 2016 through Ambitiouz Entertainment, features guest appearances from Sjava, Emtee, Saudi, Fifi Cooper, A-Reece and B3nchmarQ with production from Tweezy, Lunatik Beats, Emtee and Ruff.

== Music video ==
The visuals to "Ameni" were published on YouTube through Ambitiouz Entertainment channel on 13 May 2016. The music video was shot and directed by Ofentse Mwase; it portrays Miss Pru DJ collecting infinity stones from fellow label mates and the concept of video was taken from the director's spouse Nelisiwe Mwase.

== Awards and nominations ==
Year	Award ceremony	Category	Recipient/Nominated work	Results	Ref.
2016	South African Hip Hop Awards	Best Collabo	"Ameni"	Won	
2016	South African Hip Hop Awards	Best Musiv Video	"Ameni"	Won	
2017	South African Music Awards	Song of the Year	"Ameni"	Nominated	
2017	South African Music Awards	Record of the Year	"Ameni"	Nominated	
2017	South African Music Awards	Best Music Video of the Year	"Ameni"	Nominated	
