= Tear gas (disambiguation) =

Tear gas is a non-lethal chemical weapon that cause severe eye and respiratory pain, skin irritation, bleeding, and blindness.

Tear gas may also refer to:

- Teargas (group), a South African musical trio
- Tear gas (group), a Scottish musical group whose members joined The Alex Harvey Band
- Tear Gas (album), 2009 studio album by The Jacka

== See also ==
- Tear Gas Squad, 1940 American film
