= Ayo Emmanuel =

Talking drummer and percussionist

- Genres: Afrobeat, Amapiano
- Occupation: Percussionist
- Instruments: Talking drum, conga, drum kit

Ayo Emmanuel is a talking drummer and percussionist. He plays the talking drum, congas and drum kit across Afrobeat and Amapiano.

Emmanuel performs with DJs, playing live drums over Afrobeat and Amapiano tracks. He also performs on the talking drum. In 2025, he appeared as an independent artist at the Peterborough Celebrates Festival, and at Adire Nights in London. He also played talking drum on Fransax's medley "Sound of Jubilee". In 2026, he performed with AbuleticKing at the African Diaspora Foundation Festival in Milton Keynes.

Sanda Bubba of P.M. News described Emmanuel's drumming as restrained and responsive, noting that he locks into recorded beats rather than following them. Adaeze Okonkwo similarly noted that he leaves space between phrases. On the talking drum, which imitates the pitch of Yoruba speech, Patrick Ezema and Aminu Muhammed praised his speech-like phrasing. The Guardian likened the drum to a second voice in the ensemble.

Several critics said his sets needed a stronger overall arc, more contrast or tighter transitions. Emmanuel Daraloye wrote that the mix on "Sound of Jubilee" partly obscured the drum.
