= Miss Pru DJ =

South African DJ and record producer

Miss Pru
- Born: Prudence Sebalo; 16 April 1994 (age 31); Vaal Triangle, South Africa
- Occupations: Disc jockey; Record producer
- Years active: 2012–present
- Awards: South African Music Award for Music Video of the Year (2021)
- Musical career
- Also known as: Miss Pru the DJ
- Genres: Hip hop; African trap music; UK drill
- Instruments: Digital audio workstation; Sampler
- Label: Ambitiouz Entertainment (formerly)
- Website: iG.com/missprudj

Prudence Sebalo (born 16 April 1985), is a South African DJ and record producer prominently known under the alias of Miss Pru DJ (or simply Miss Pru). She gained recognition subsequent to the release of her single "Ameni" with guest appearances from Sjava, Emtee, Saudi, A-Reece, Fifi Cooper and B3nchmarQ.

She signed a recording deal with Ambitiouz Entertainment in 2015 and made her departure after 7 years in late 2022.

"Price to Pay" together with Blaq Diamond and Malome Vector was released on 8 May 2020. The song was certified double platinum in South Africa. In addition, the song won Music Video of the Year at the 26th Ceremony of South African Music Awards.

Her debut studio album Bavumile, was released on 24 August 2023. Departing from her hip hop genre, Bavumile introduced her to amapiano. It was supported by one single "Khetha Wena".

== Singles ==
=== As lead artist ===
List of singles as lead artist, with selected chart positions and certifications, showing year released and album name
Title	Year	Peak chart positions	Certifications	Album
Title	Year	ZA	Certifications	Album
"Welele" (featuring Jika Boys)	2015	—		Non-album single
"Phumelele" (featuring Emtee, A-Reece, Sjava, Amanda Black, Saudí, LaSauce, Fifi Cooper)	2016	—		Non-album single
"Ameni" (featuring Sjava, A-Reece, B3nchMarQ, Emtee, Fifi Cooper, Saudí)	2016	—		Non-album single
"Ugesi" (featuring Emtee, Neo, Saudí, Sjava, Flame)	2016	—		Non-album single
"Isaga Lam" (featuring Gigi Lamayne, LaSauce, Londie London, Nadia Nakai)	2017	—		Non-album single
"Wena Wedwa" (featuring Cici)	2017	—		Non-album single
"Sondela (featuring Blaq Diamond, Lisa, LaSauce, CiCi, Lloyiso)	2019	—		Non-album single
"Price to Pay" (featuring Blaq Diamond, Malome Vector)	2020	—	2× Platinum	Non-album single
"uHulumeni" (featuring Blaq Diamond, Manny Yack, Malome Vector, Fakaloice)	2020	—		Non-album single
"Chillisi" (featuring Blaq Diamond, Malome Vector)	2021	—		Non-album single
"Husiku" (featuring Ncesh P, Nkatha, B33Kay SA, Teddy)	2022	—		Non-album single
"Khetha Wena" (Miss Pru DJ, Q-Mark featuring Afriikan Papi, Amahle, Slick Widit)	2023	—		Bavumile
"—" denotes a recording that did not chart or was not released in that territory.

== Awards and nominations ==
Year	Award ceremony	Category	Recipient/Nominated work	Results	Ref.
2017	Metro FM Music Awards	Best Hit Single	"Ameni"	Nominated	
2017	Metro FM Music Awards	Best Collaboration	"Ameni"	Won	
2021	27th SAMAs	Best Music Video of the Year	"Price to Pay"	Won	
2021	27th SAMAs	Record of the Year	"Price to Pay"	Nominated	
2020	SAHHA	Song of the Year	"Price to Pay"	Nominated	
2016	SAHHA	Best Collabo	"Ameni"	Won	
2016	SAHHA	Best Musiv Video	"Ameni"	Won	
