= 23rd Annual South African Music Awards =

2017 award ceremony

- Date: May 27, 2017
- Venue: Sun City Resort
- Country: South Africa
- Presented by: Somizi Mhlongo; Tumi Morake

Highlights
- Most awards: Kwesta (5)
- Most nominations: Nasty C (6)
- Website: samusicawards.co.za

Television/radio coverage
- Network: SABC

The 23rd Annual South African Music Awards was held on May 27, 2017, at Sun City Resort and were hosted by Tumi Morake and Somizi Mhlongo. The nominees were announced on April 20, 2017. Nasty C lead the nominations with 6, followed by Kwesta 5.

== Performers ==
Artist(s)	Song(s)
Main show
Amanda Black	"Amazulu"

== Winners and nominees ==
Below is the list of nominees and winners for the popular music categories. Winner's are highlighted in bold.

**Best Newcomer of the Year**: **Amanda Black - Amazulu**; Soul Kulture - Ngeliny'ilanga; Babes Wodumo - Gqom Queen Vol. 1; Sketchy Bongo- Unmasked; Nasty C - Bad Hair Extensions	**Best Duo/Group of the Year**: **Black Motion - Ya Badimo**; The Soil - The Soil; Jaziel Brothers - Jaziel Brothers; Soul Kulture - Ngeliny'ilanga; The Parlotones - Trinkets Relics & Heirlooms
**Best Female Artist of the Year**: **Amanda Black - Amazulu**; Lebo Sekgobela - Restored; Babes Wodumo - Gqom Queen Vol. 1; Thandiswa - Belede; Kelly Khumalo - My Truth	**Best Male Artist of the Year**: **Kwesta - Dakar II**; Musa - Musa; Nasty C - Bad Hair Extensions; Nathi - Umbulelo Wam; Dr Tumi - Heart of a king
**Best Album of the Year**: **Kwesta - Dakar II**; Black Motion - Ya Badimo; Amanda Black - Amazulu; Nasty C - Bad Hair Extensions; Thandiswa - Belede	**Record of the Year**: **Nasty C**
**Best Maskandi Album**: **Khuzani - Inyoni yomthakathi**; Imfez'emnyama - Monalisa; Imithente - s"yawuvala umlomo; Shwi noMtekhala - Kwabhalwa etsheni; Thokozani Langa - Amabrazo	**Classical Instrumental Album**: **Charl du Plessis Trio**; Imilonji KaNtu Choral Society - And Then I Heard A Voice by SJ Khosa; The Voice of Angels - The Voice of Angels Volume 2; University of Pretoria - Love and War; Bongani Radebe - Buyelekhaya Sax Rendition
**Best Afro Pop Album**: **Vusi Nova - Vusi Nova**; Jaziel Brothers - Jaziel Brothers; Musa - Musa; Robbie Malinga - Robbie Malinga; The Soil - The Soil	**African Indigenous Gospel Album**: **Living In Christ Legends - Living In Christ Legends**; Amadodana Ase Wesile - Amadodana Ase Wesile; Jerusalema E Ncha - Jerusalema E Ncha; Lejwe la Motheo - Lejwe la Motheo; T.C.C.C. Mass Choir - T.C.C.C. Mass Choir
**Best Rock Album**: **Albert Frost - The Wake Up**; The Sweet Resistance - Where; There Is Hope; Lost & Found - Lost & Found; Richard Stirton - Middle Ground; The Parlotones - Trinkets, Relics & Heirlooms	**Best Pop Album**: **Good Luck - The Nature Within**; Matthew Mole - Run; Locnville - Taste The Weekend; Sketchy Bongo - Unmasked; TiMO ODV - Origins (Digital Edition)
**Beste Kontemporere Musiek Album**: **Joshua na die Reën - Die Wêreld Binne My**; Adam Tas - Patatas en Pyptabak; Coenie de Villiers - Emoji; Refentse - My hart bly in ‘n taal; Ricus Nel - Ouskool Boerseun	**Best Newcomer Rap Album**: **Kwesta - Dakar**; A Reece - Paradise; Khuli Chana - One Source; Nasty C - Bad Hair Extensions; Stogie T - Stogie T
**Best Kwaito Album**: **Dr Malinga - Good Will**; Babes Wodumo - Gqom Queen Vol. 1; Bullistic - N.W.O (New World Order); Taylor K - Paper Chase; Trademark & Zinhle Ngidi - Trademark & Zinhle Ngidi	**Best Dance Album**: **Black Motion - Ya Badimo**; DJ Clock - The 5th tick; Durbans' Finest - Durbans' Finest - Reloaded; NaakMusiQ - Born to Entertain; Mobi Dixon - Live The Music
**Best Traditional Faith Music Album**: **Spirit of Praise - Spirit Of Praise Vol.6**; Deborah Fraser - Uhambo; Sfiso Ncwane - Wethembekile Baba; Teboho - Nkutlwele Bohloko; Zaza - Blowing the horn of chronicle	**Best Adult Contemporary Album**: Elvis Blue - Optics; Hugh Masekela - No Borders; Majozi - Fire; Mango Groove - Faces to the Sun; Msaki - Zaneliza: How The Water Moves
**Live Audio Visual Recording Album**: Joyous Celebration - Joyous Celebration 20 – Part 2 – The Alumni; Joyous Celebration - Joyous Celebration 20 Live at The Moses Mabhida Stadium; Khaya Mthethwa - The Dawn; Krone & Various Artists - Krone 3 DVD; Spirit Of Praise - Spirit Of Praise Vol.6	**Best Music Video of the Year**: Khuli Chana - One Source; Miss Pru DJ - Ameni; Nasty C - Don't do it; Nasty C - Good Girls; Reason ft AKA & Khuli Chana - Yipikayay
**Best Produced Album**: Afrotraction - Love and respect; Brenda Mtambo - So Much More; Matthew Mole - Run; Rubber Duc - The Secret Sun; Sjava - Isina Muva	**Remix of the Year**: Distruction Boyz - Wololo (Dbanj Remix); DJ Mizz - Close to you (Mizz Afro Remix); Evida - The Woods (Evida Remix); Kyle Deutsch - Can't Get enough (Official Remix); Vic - Wena Wedwa (MusicCraftMAN Mix)
**Best African Artist**: Jah Prayzah - Jah Prayzah; Oliver Mtukudzi - Oliver Mtukudzi; Patoranking - Patoranking; Vee Mampeezy - Vee Mampeezy; Vuyo Katsha - Vuyo Katsha	**Best Traditional Music Album**: Candy - Easy Come Easy Go; Dr Thomas Chauke Na Shinyori **Sisters - Shimatsatsa No 34: Xiganga; Mmaausi - Monna Oa Sokelwa; Qadasi & Maqhinga - Lashis' Ilanga; Shabalala Rhythm - Yebo Ngiyavuma
**Best Engineered Album**: The Soil - Echoes of Kofifi; Arno Carstens - Aandblom 13; Mango Groove - Faces To The Sun; Jesse Clegg - Things Unseen; LeAnne Dlamini - Warrior	**SAMRO Highest Airplay of the Year**: **Kwesta**
**SAMPRA Highest Airplay of the Year**: **Kwesta**

=== Special awards ===
- International Achievement Award – Black Coffee

=== Lifetime Achievement Award (Brought to you by Telkom) ===
- Nana Coyote (posthumous award)
- Bhekumuzi Luthuli (posthumous award)
- Roger Lucey

=== Best Selling Album and Music Downloads of the Year ===
- Nathi Buyelekhaya

=== Best Selling DVD ===
- Joyous Celebration (Volume 19: Back to the Cross) - Joyous Celebration

=== Best Selling Overall Music Download ===
- Sfiso Ncwane (Bayede Baba)

=== Best Selling Music Download (Ring-back Tone) ===
- Sfiso Ncwane (Bayede Baba)

=== Best Selling Full-track Music Download ===
- Thabani makhanya

=== Sampra Award ===
Highest Radio Airplay of the Year – DBN Nyts "Shumaya"

=== Record of the year ===
- AKA - One Time
- Amanda Black - Amazulu
- Babes Wodumo - Wololo ft Mampintsha
- Black Coffee - Your Eyes ft Shekhinah
- DJ Clock - Wolves feat Prom Knights
- Kwesta - Ngud' feat Cassper Nyovest
- Locnville - Cold Shoulder (Official)
- Matthew Mole - Run (Official Video)
- Miss Pru DJ - Ameni Ft Emtee, Fifi Cooper, A-Reece, Sjava, B3nchMarQ & Saudi
- Nasty C - Hell Naw (Official Video)
