= Tsongas =

Tsongas is a surname. Notable people with the surname include:

- Niki Tsongas (born 1946), American politician, wife of Paul
- Paul Tsongas (1941–1997), American politician
  - Tsongas Center

== See also ==
- Tsonga (disambiguation)
- Tsonga language
