= Aymos =

South African singer and songwriter

- Born: Babili Aymos Shili; January 17, 1989 (age 37); Tembisa, Gauteng, South Africa
- Origin: South Africa
- Genres: Amapiano *Pop
- Occupations: Singer; songwriter
- Instrument: Vocals
- Years active: 2021–present
- Labels: Lyf Styl Entertainment; Sound African Recordings; PLATOON

Babili Amos Shili (born January 17, 1989) mononymously known as Aymos, is a South African singer and songwriter. He is best known for the hit single "Emcimbini" which was produced by Kabza De Small and DJ Maphorisa.

== Early life ==
Aymos was born and bred in Thembisa, Gauteng, South Africa. He started out by singing at church and in high school, he formed his own choir.

== Career ==
In 2020, Aymos released a collaborative album with Mas Musiq titled Shonamalanga. The album was nominated at the 27th South African Music Awards for best amapiano album and best duo/group of the year. In September 2021, he released his debut album Yimi Lo. The album features Kabza De Small and South African musicians Major League DJz, Josiah De Disciple and DBN Gogo.

In May 2022, he made collaboration on African Lullabies Part 2, album by Platoon. His single "Fatela" with Ami Faku was released on October 28, 2022. The song was certified multi-platinum in South Africa.

In June 2024, Aymos announced his second studio album Impilo. "10K Yey' nkomo", with Mas Musiq, Samthing Soweto featuring Sha Sha was released on August 16, 2024 as albums lead single. The album was released on August 30, 2024.

== Discography ==
=== Studio albums ===
- Yim Lo (2021)
- Impilo (2024)

=== Extended Plays ===
- Shonamalanga (with Mas Musiq)

== Singles ==
=== As lead artist ===
List of singles as lead artist, with selected chart positions and certifications, showing year released and album name
Title	Year	Peak chart positions	Certifications	Album
Title	Year	ZA	Certifications	Album
"Fatela" (Aymos, Ami Faku)	2022	—	Multi-Platinum	
"Macala" (Bru-C, Aymos, BL Zero)	2022	—		
"Ziyakhala" (M1llionz, Aymos, Mdu aka TRP)	2022			
"Mama"	2022	—		
"Vukani Bo Dakie" (Megadrumz, Aymos)	2023	—		
"Izenzo" (Bassie, Aymos, T-Man SA)	2023	—	Multi-Platinum	
"Ungowami" (Mr Dutch, Aymos)	2023			
"Amandla" (featuring Jessica LM)	2023			
"Isgubhu" (Sam Deep, Aymos, Njelic)	2023			
"Amabhoza" (Aymos, Mas Musiq featuring MaWhoo)	2024	—		Non-album single
"Another Version of Us" (Sinzu77, Aymos)	2024	—		Non-album single
"Moya Munye" (Omhle Diya, Aymos)	2024	—		Non-album single
"10K Yey'nkomo" (Aymos, Mas Musiq, Samthing Soweto featuring Sha Sha)	2024	—		Non-album single
"—" denotes a recording that did not chart or was not released in that territory.

== Awards and nominations ==
Year	Award ceremony	Prize	Result	Ref.
2021	South African Music Awards	Best amapiano album	Nominated	
2021	South African Music Awards	Best duo/group of the year	Nominated	
2021	South African Amapiano Music Awards	Best amapiano collaboration	Nominated	
2022	Global Music Awards Africa	Album/Ep of the Year	Won	
2024	Metro FM Music Awards	Song of the Year	Nominated	
2024	Metro FM Music Awards	Best Music Video	Won	
2024	Metro FM Music Awards	Best Male	Won	
