= Mnike =

2023 single by Tyler ICU and Tumelo_za

Single by Tyler ICU and Tumelo_za featuring DJ Maphorisa, Nandipha808, Ceeka RSA and Tyron Dee
- Language: Zulu
- English title: Give him
- Released: 28 April 2023
- Venue: Gauteng
- Genre: Amapiano
- Length: 6:31 (official release); 3:13 (UK Radio Edit)
- Label: SME Africa; New Money Gang
- Songwriter(s): Tumelo Mokoena
- Producer(s): Austin Kulani Baloyi; Themba Sekowe; Christopher Ejimet; Sipho Nicolas Nkabinde; Xolani Ledwaba

Tyler ICU singles chronology
"NGiMOJA (Remix)" (2023)	"Mnike" (2023)	"Thembalami" (2023)

DJ Maphorisa singles chronology
"Nduma Ndumane" (2023)	"Mnike" (2023)	"Uzongenzani" (2023)

Tumelo_za singles chronology
"NGiMOJA (Remix)" (2023)	"Mnike" (2023)

Nandipha808 singles chronology
"Bula Boot" (2023)	"Mnike" (2023)	"Suka" (2023)

Ceeka RSA singles chronology
"Cheese" (2023)	"Mnike" (2023)	"Suka" (2023)

Tyron Dee singles chronology
"NGiMOJA" (2023)	"Mnike" (2023)

Music video
- "Mnike (Visualizer)" on YouTube

Official audio
- "Mnike (Official audio)" on YouTube

UK Radio Edit
- "Mnike (UK Radio Edit)" on YouTube

Audio sample
- A 21-seconds sample of "Mnike": file; help

"Mnike" is an amapiano single by South African record producer Tyler ICU and singer-songwriter Tumelo_za. It features guest appearances from DJ Maphorisa, Nandipha808, Ceeka RSA and Tyron Dee as it was released on 28 April 2023 under Sony Music Entertainment Africa (with exclusive licence from New Money Gang Records). It peaked at the number one spot on Billboard South Africa Songs, The Official South African Charts, and hit one million streams two weeks after its release.

== Accolades ==
=== Awards and nominations ===
Awards and nominations for "Mnike"
Organization	Year	Category	Result	Ref.
DStv Content Creator Awards	2024	Song of the Year	Nominated	
Tanzania Music Awards	2024	Best East, West & South Africa Song	Nominated	
South African Music Awards	2024	CAPASSO Most Streamed Song Of The Year	Won	
South African Music Awards	2024	Motsepe Foundation Record of the Year	Nominated	

== Charts ==
Chart performance for "Mnike"
Chart (2023)	Peak position
Nigeria (TurnTable Top 100)	83
Nigeria (TurnTable Top International Songs)	13
South Africa (RiSA)	1
South Africa Airplay (TOSAC)	3
South Africa Songs (Billboard)	1
UK Afrobeats (OCC)	8

== Controversy ==
The duo Ceeka RSA and Nandipha808 both claimed that the producer Tyler ICU has not paid them for their involvement in the single, the duo continued to add that it was their idea to sample "Nika Nika (Magical Mix)" by Dlala Thukzin. The artists also laid out the entire beat before they sent it out to Tyler ICU. However, there was no paperwork involved. Allegedly, the producer reached out to release more of Ceeka RSA's and Nandipha808's music. As of July 2023, the duo has not received compensation for their contributions to the single.

On 17 July 2023, Tyler ICU joined a Space conversation with a controversial blogger, and the duo Nandipha808 and Ceeka RSA and cleared the air. In response to the allegations Tyler ICU said

"I didn't finesse anybody. I work with people all the time. I worked with a bunch of producers [and] no-one has ever come out to say I robbed them and sh*t. Only these kids because they feel pressured that I am gigging. It just so happens that the song is a hit and I am getting more gigs."

He added that he did not claim the royalties as it was almost impossible for him to access the royalties to the song without the other participants signatures, and later tweeted that the song is his and Tumelo's, including DJ Maphorisa, Nandipha808, Ceeka RSA and Tyron Dee.
