= Mr Dutch =

Nigerian Singer

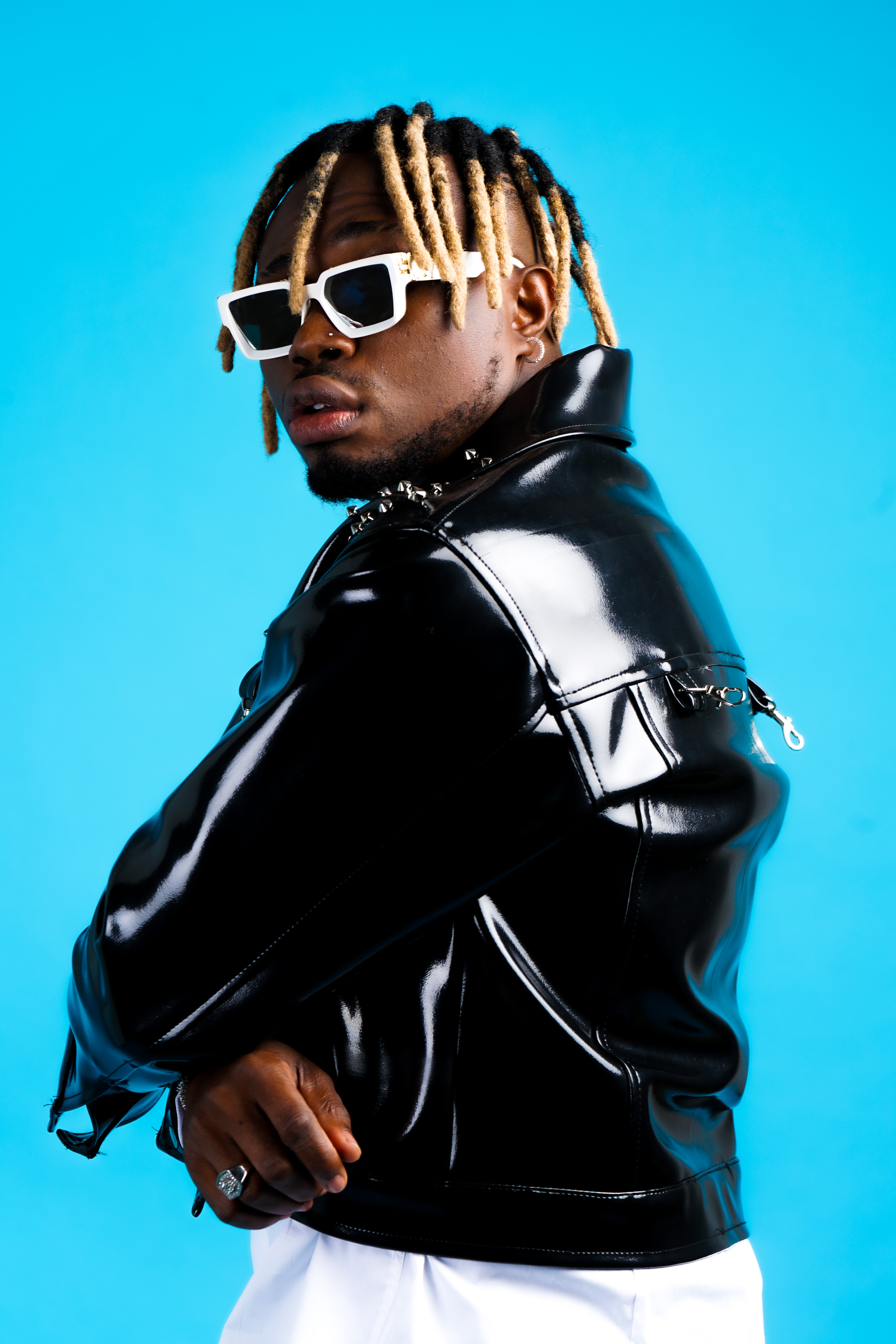

Background information
- Born: Bright Ukpabi
- Genres: Afrobeats; afropop; afroswing; Amapiano
- Occupations: Singer, Songwriter,
- Instrument: Vocals

Bright Ukpabi, known professionally as Mr Dutch is a Nigerian Afro-Pop singer/songwriter and performing artist. He is known for establishing Dutch Dreams Records a community based Record Label. He has collaborated with Burna Boy, Kida Kudz, and Reekado Banks among many others.

== Early life ==
Bright Ukpabi was born in lagos, Abia.

== Career ==
In 2018 the Afro-pop singer/songwriter released "She want" his debut project, in the following year he released "Fire down" where he featured Nigerian singer/songwriter, Reekado Banks. On April 27, 2018, he released "Antidote" where he featured Solidstar. On October 16, 2018, he released "E no finish" Ft Burna Boy. On April 22, 2019, he released "Better soup". On February 7, 2020 he released "Keys To My Heart". On May 29, 2020, he released "mamacita". On December 11, 2020, he released his debut EP "Keys To My Heart (Afrique Remix)" a 4-track extended play with guest appearances from Teni, Lava Lava, KLY and Kidi. On December 3, 2021, he released "Chop Life x2" where he featured chief priest. On May 26, 2022, he released "Chop life remix" where he featured Ceeza Milli. On June 24, 2022, he collaborated with Kida Kudz on a joint Extended play project Titled "World Citizens" with guest appearances from Barry jhay and Sam wise. On March 17, 2023, he released "Tornado Ride" a 2 track extended play project.

=== Dutch Dreams Records ===
Dutch Dreams Records was established by Bright Ukpabi professionally known as Mr Dutch With a focus on musical versatility and cross-genre collaborations, Mr Dutch is the CEO of Dutch Dreams Records the label acts as an umbrella for Mr Dutch as all his music is released under the label. In a candid interview with The Sun Newspaper he said “I want people to see themselves in a different form, I want people to understand that some parts of us are yet to be discovered and only with the right energy, right vibe, right place and right time will we be shown this super magnificent part of us. The mechanism of bringing out the powerful strong African man and woman is what the video showcases and the magical powers we all have to change our life.” He collaborated with the label on its debut project "Gang Shxt " with guest appearances from Kel p, Yung Og, Ello, Hugo Flow, Black Angel and RAF DON.

=== Afro-Cyborg ===
Afro-cyborg is a genre of music created by Mr Dutch he explained it in an interview with GQ South Africa as "discovering the different side of you, the fictional part of you that simply says you have the ability to do and become whatever you want to be." “Afro-Cyborg are the sounds of freedom, greatness, liberation, and with those sounds you will understand you can now achieve anything yourself, you can now be what you have longed to be especially if you have the power of Mamacita balancing you and balancing your system,” he said to P.M News Nigeria.

== Discography ==
=== Eps ===
Titles	Details
Keys To My Heart (Afrique Remix)	Released: December 11, 2020; Label: Dutch Dreams Records; Formats: Digital download
Tornado Ride	Released: March 17, 2023; Label: Dutch Dreams Records; Formats: Digital download

=== Collaborative Eps ===
Title	Artists	Details
World Citizens	Mr Dutch and Kida Kuda	Released: June 24, 2022; Label: Dutch Dreams Records; Formats: Digital download

=== Singles ===
Title	Artists	Year
Fire Down	Mr Dutch ft Reekado banks	2018
Antidote	Mr Dutch ft Solidstar	2018
E no finish	Mr Dutch ft Burna Boy	2018
Better Soup	Mr Dutch	2019
Mamacita	Mr Dutch	2020
Chop Life x2	Mr Dutch ft Chief priest	2021
Chop Life Remix	Mr Dutch ft Ceeza Milli	2022
