= Dalie =

Single by Kamo Mphela, Tyler ICU and Khalil Harrison featuring Baby S.O.N
- Language: Zulu
- Released: 11 October 2023
- Recorded: 2023
- Genre: Amapiano
- Length: 4:40 (official release); 3:24 (radio edit)
- Label: Kamo Mphela Entertainment
- Songwriters: Kamogelo Matona; Austin Kulani Baloyi; Mxolisi Nkosi; Phelela Gcwelumusa Ziphakeme Mathonsi
- Producers: Tyler ICU; Khalil Harrison

Tyler ICU singles chronology
"Forever Yena (Vocal Remix)" (2023)	"Dalie" (2023)	"Xikuteka" (2023)

Kamo Mphela singles chronology
"Umhlolo" (2023)	"Dalie" (2023)	"Woza La" (2023)

Music video
- "Dalie (Official music video)" on YouTube

Official audio
- "Dalie (mixed)" on YouTube

"Dalie" is a single by South African internet personality and singer Kamo Mphela, and record producers Tyler ICU and Khalil Harrison. It was released on 11 October 2023 by Kamo Mphela Entertainment, distributed by Africori, and features guest appearance from Baby S.O.N.

== Commercial performance ==
"Dalie" became commercially successful, charted number 1 across three countries Malawi, Zimbabwe, South Africa and reached number 11 on global Shazam charts. In the first 4 days of release the song surpassed 2 million digital streams and certified Gold in South Africa.

In addition the song reached Platinum certification 41 days later.

== Popularity ==
The song became massively popular on TikTok due to starting as a viral dance trend. The hashtag #daliechallenge did surpassed billions of posts using the hashtag in videos.

== Certification ==
Region	Certification
South Africa (RISA)	Platinum

== Charts ==
Chart performance for "Dalie"
Chart (2023)	Peak position
South Africa (Billboard)	3
South Africa (RiSA)	3
South African Airplay (TOSAC)	8
UK Afrobeats (OCC)	17

== Accolades ==
Awards and nominations for "Dalie"
Organization	Year	Category	Result	Ref.
Metro FM Music Awards	2023	Song of the Year	Won	
Metro FM Music Awards	2023	Best Music Video	Nominated	
Metro FM Music Awards	2023	Best Viral Challenge	Nominated	
Basadi in Music Awards	2024	Amapiano Artist of the Year	Won	
Basadi in Music Awards	2024	Song of the Year	Nominated	
Basadi in Music Awards	2024	Music Video of the Year	Won	
DStv Content Creator Awards	2024	Song of the Year	Nominated	
African Entertainment Awards USA	2024	Song of the Year	Nominated	
