= Izenzo (song) =

2023 single by Bassie & Aymos featuring T-man

Single by Bassie, Aymos featuring T-Man SA
- Released: August 22, 2023
- Recorded: 2023
- Songwriters: Basetsana; Babili Amos Shili
- Producer: T-man

Aymos singles chronology
"Fatela" (2022)	"Izenzo" (2023)	"Ukhisimusi" / "Izenzo" (2023)

Izenzo is a single by South African singers Bassie and Aymos featuring T-Man SA, released on 22 August 2023 through Sony. It was written by Babili Aymos & Basetsana Bassie.

== Commercial performance ==
The song was certified 3× Platinum in South Africa.

=== Accolades ===
"Izenzo" received nominations for Song of the Year and won Best Music Video at the 18th ceremony of Metro FM Music Awards. In addition, the song received nomination for Amapiano Artist of the Year at the 2024 Basadi in Music Awards. At the 30th ceremony of South African Music Awards Izenzo earned nomination for Motsepe Foundation Record of the Year.

Year	Nominee / work	Award	Result	Ref.
2024	"Izenzo"	Song of the Year	Nominated	
2024	"Izenzo"	Best Music Video	Won	
2024	"Izenzo"	Amapiano Artist of the Year	Nominated	
2024	"Izenzo"	Motsepe Foundation Record of the Year	Nominated	

== Certifications ==
Region	Certification	Certified units/sales
South Africa (RISA)	3× Platinum	120,000^{‡}
^{‡} Sales+streaming figures based on certification alone.
