= Kamo Mphela =

South African singer (born 1999)

- Born: Kamogelo Matona; November 29, 1999 (age 26); Soweto, South Africa
- Other name: Kgabo
- Citizenship: South African
- Education: Kibler Secondary High School
- Occupations: Singer, dancer
- Years active: Dancer: 2018–present; Singer: 2019–present
- Children: None
- Musical career
- Genre: Amapiano
- Instruments: Vocals
- Label: Kamo Mphela Entertainment

Kamogelo Matona (born 29 November 1999), known professionally as Kamo Mphela, is a South African amapiano dancer and singer. She became an internet celebrity after she posted a video of her dancing on her social media account.

== Early life and education ==
Mphela grew up in a township Emdeni, Soweto. She studied Media at the Boston Media House, for a year.

== Career ==
Her passion for dancing started at an early age, when she accompanied her father who worked at YFM and at events where she would perform on stage and dance which eventually led to her getting more exposure through live performances. She later became popular by posting videos on Instagram where she displayed her dancing skills. Before pursuing her dancing career she had tried acting and had got a chance to be an extra on the TV soap Isibaya, but she later realised that it was not for her and she started performing as a dancer at gigs. Her dancing skills eventually got her the name "Queen of Amapiano".

In 2019, she got signed to Major League Music and released her EP titled, Twentee under the label. She has also released songs such as "Suka Emabozeni" and "Menemene" and has collaborated with South African singer Busiswa on the single "Sbwl" and has featured on the MFR Soulz single "Amanikiniki" ranked #1 on Good Hope FM's SA House Music Top 10 Chart. She has also performed and worked with local musicians such as Nadia Nakai and Killer Kau. She has been featured as a singer and dancer in the amapiano songs such as "Sukendleleni" and "Labantwana Ama Uber". Apart from amapiano, she has also danced to other South African popular music genres including gqom, kwaito and pantsula.

"Dalie" with Tyler ICU and Khalil Harrison featuring Baby S.O.N released on 11 October 2023. The song debuted number 1 across three countries Malawi, Zimbabwe, South Africa and chartered number 11 on global Shazam charts. In addition the song amassed 2 million digital streams in 4 days and certified Gold in South Africa. The song reached Platinum certification. In a February 2024 interview, Kamo stated she nearly quitted Amapiano due to mental-health struggles.

== Awards and nominations ==
Awards and nominations received by Kamo Mphela
Organization	Year	Category	Recipient or nominee	Result	Ref.
Metro FM Music Awards	2023	Song of the Year	"Dalie"	Nominated	
Metro FM Music Awards	2023	Best Music Video	"Dalie"	Nominated	
Metro FM Music Awards	2023	Best Viral Challenge	"Dalie"	Nominated	
Basadi in Music Awards	2024	Amapiano Artist of the Year	"Dalie"	Won	
Basadi in Music Awards	2024	Song of the Year	"Dalie"	Nominated	
Basadi in Music Awards	2024	Music Video of the Year	"Dalie"	Won	
African Entertainment Awards USA	2024	Song of the Year	"Dalie"	Nominated	
DStv Content Creator Awards	2024	Song of the Year	"Dalie"	Nominated	
DStv Content Creator Awards	2024	Fashion & Style Award	Herself	Nominated	
Trace Awards	2024	Best Dancer	Herself	Nominated	

== Discography ==
- Twentee (2019)
- Nkulunkulu (2021)

== Singles ==
=== As lead artist ===
List of singles as lead artist, with selected chart positions and certifications, showing year released and album name
Title	Year	Peak chart positions		Certifications	Album
Title	Year	ZA	UK Afro Beats	Certifications	Album
"Dubai" (featuring Daliwonga, Sizwe Alakine, Tyler ICU)	2021	—			
"iPiano" (Sha Sha, Kamo Mphela featuring Felo Le Tee)	2021	21		—	
"Ghost" (featuring Daliwonga, Felo Le Tee)	2022	—			
"Hannah Montana"	2023	—	-		
"Umhlolo" (Kamo Mphela, Masterpiece YVK featuring AyaProw & Yumbs)	2023	—	-		
"Dalie" (Kamo Mphela, Tyler ICU, Khalil Haris, featuring Baby S.O.N)	2023	1	17	Platinum	
"Partii" (Kamo Mphela, Aymos, Que DJ & Jay Music featuring SpacePose)	2025	13	28		
"—" denotes a recording that did not chart or was not released in that territory.

=== As featured artist ===
List of singles as featured artist, with selected chart positions and certifications, showing year released and album name
Title	Year	Peak chart positions	Certifications	Album
Title	Year	ZA	Certifications	Album
"SBWL" (Busiswa featuring Kamo Mphela)	2020	—		
"Elon Musk" (Da L.E.S feat. Focalistic, Kamo Mphela & Jobe London)	2020	—		
"Lashiteku" (Tipcee featuring Kamo Mphela, DJ Tira, Blaqshandis, Worst Behaviour)	2021	—		
"Universe" (Hip-Naughtic Sean featuring Kamo Mphela, Kay Invictus, Toss)	2021	—		
"Ama Million" (King Groove featuring Kamo Mphela)	2021	—		
"Top Level (DJ Sumbody featuring Kamo Mphela, The Lowkeys)	2021	—		
"Siyavuma (Re-Up)" (featuring Kamo Mphela, M.J, Tom London, Flakko, HolaDjBash, Njabz Finest)	2022	—		
"Woza La" (Ms. Cosmo featuring Blxckie, Kamo Mphela, RudeBoyz & Nobantu Vilakazi)	2023	—		
"VACAY" (T.I. featuring Kamo Mphela)	2023	—		
"Hade Boss (Re-Up)" (DJ Lag, DJ Maphorisa, Robot Boii featuring Kamo Mphela, 2woshort, Xduppy, K.C Driller, Mr Nation Thingz)	2024	—		
"The Return Of Tobetsa" (ShaunMusiq, Ftears & Myztro featuring Focalistic, Daliwonga, Kamo Mphela, Mbali The Real, BoiBizza, Stompiiey & 2woshort)	2025	_		The Return Of Tobetsa
"Worst Behavior" (Jay Music, Caleb, Kamo Mphela & DBN Gogo)				East Kings
"—" denotes a recording that did not chart or was not released in that territory.
