= Nkosazana Daughter =

South African singer and songwriter

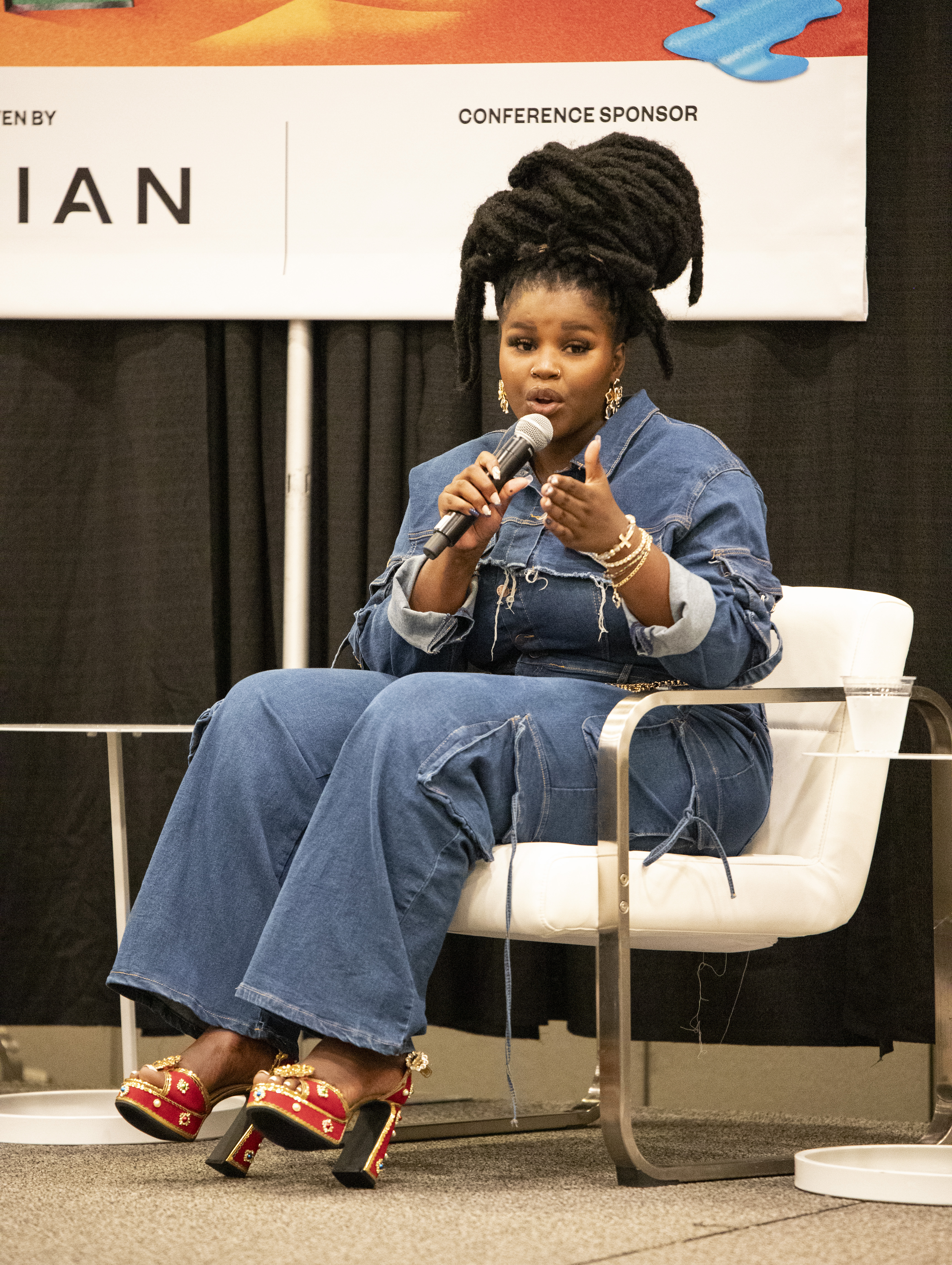
- Born: Nkosazana Nolwazi Kimberly Nzama; 6 October 2000 (age 25); Durban, Kwa-Zulu Natal, South Africa
- Awards: African Rising Star

Nkosazana Nolwazi Kimberly Nzama (born 6 October 2000), professionally known as Nkosazana Daughter, is a South African singer and songwriter. Nzama gained national recognition after she released her 14-track debut album that featured notable artists such as DJ Maphorisa, Makhadzi, Master KG, Kabza de Small, Tyler ICU, Major League DJz, Young Jonn, and Chronical Deep, and others. She collaborated with Master KG and Lowsheen on "Sofa Silahlane", which was released on 12 May 2022. The track hit number 1 on Apple's Local iTunes Charts. In April 2022, the music video of 'Dali Nguwe' featuring Master KG reached 3 million views in three weeks. In June 2023, her debut studio album got released and charted number 34 on Spotify Top albums, and debuted number 3 in South Africa. She has performed in Malawi, Zimbabwe, Mozambique, United States and several other countries.

== Background ==
=== Early life ===
Nzama was born on 6 October 2000 in Durban, South Africa. Nzama gained recognition after releasing singles "Izitha", "Umama Akekho", "Sbindi Uyabulala" and many more. She has been featured in hit songs like "Dali Nguwe", and "Ebusuku". She has collaborated with a number of Amapiano artists including Mpura, Kabza De Small, Heavy K, Master KG and DJ Maphorisa.

=== Career ===
Nzama started music at young age and she entered mainstream music industry when she started working with DJ Prince Kaybee and Goldmax from the Distruction Boyz musical duo. After contacting with DJ Maphorisa and the Mpura on Instagram, Nzama's music career began emerging. During a live interview with TshisaLIVE news company, Nzama said that music is one things that drew her crazy. Besides music, she has also collaborated with Luxe Homme, a South African handmade luxury brand company. She shared the collection branded with the initials ND (short for Nkosazana Daughter) on her Instagram page. Towards the end of June 2023, she was announced as Africa Rising recipient by Apple Music.

In December 2022, she travelled to Malawi and shared stage with Malawian prominent musician, Lucius Banda, which took place at Lilongwe Golf Club. Other supporting performing artists were Namadingo, Black Missionaries, Billy Kaunda, and others.

"Makhelwane" with Master KG was released on 17 November 2023 as the album's lead single.

In July 2024, Nkosazana Daughter and Master KG announced their collaboration studio album Makhelwane. The album was released on 30 August 2024.

Makhelwane was certified gold in South Africa with over 100 million streams on its first day, became her first album to do so.

== Accolades ==
- Africa Rising recipient by Apple Music

== Discography ==
=== Studio albums ===
- Uthingo Le Nkosazana (2023)

=== Collaborative albums ===
- Makhelwane (2024)

=== As lead artist ===
List of singles as lead artist, with selected chart positions and certifications
Title	Year	Peak chart positions	Certifications	Album
Title	Year	ZA	Certifications	Album
"Ring Ring Ring" (featuring Master KG, Lowsheen)	2023	—	RiSA: Gold	Uthingo Le Nkosazana
"Uzongenzani" featuring Scorpion kings	2023	—		Uthingo Le Nkosazana
"Amaphutha" (featuring Master KG, Lowsheen & Murumba Pitch)	2023	—		Uthingo Le Nkosazana
"Moya Ongcwele" (Master KG, Nkosazana Daughter featuring Nobuhle)	2024	—		Non-album single
"Basela" (DJ Tshegu, Focalistic, Ch'cco & Nkosazana Daughter featuring Ceehle & Sims Noreng) "Emsakazweni" (Nkosazana Daughter featuring Nobuhle)	2025	—		Non-album single
"—" denotes a recording that did not chart or was not released in that territory.

=== As featured artist ===
List of singles as featured artist, with selected chart positions and certifications, showing year released and album name
Title	Year	Peak chart positions	Certifications	Album
Title	Year	ZA	Certifications	Album
"Kuyabanda" (Claudio Wade featuring Nkosazana Daughter)	2022			Waves and Wind
"Emayeda" (Claudio Wade featuring Nkosazana Daughter)	2023			Waves and Wind
"—" denotes a recording that did not chart or was not released in that territory.

== Achievements ==
=== African Entertainment Awards USA ===
Year	Nominee / work	Award	Result	Ref.
2024	Makhelwane	Album of the Year	Nominated	

=== Basadi in Music Awards ===
Year	Nominee / work	Award	Result	Ref.
2023	Herself	Amapiano Artist of the Year	Nominated	
2024	"Amaphutha"	Amapiano Artist of the Year	Nominated	

=== Feather Awards ===
Year	Nominee / work	Award	Result	Ref.
2025	Herself	Musician of the Year	Pending	

=== Sound City MVP Award ===
Year	Nominee / work	Award	Result	Ref.
2023	Herself	Best Female MVP	Nominated	

=== South African Dance Music Awards ===
Year	Nominee / work	Award	Result
2023	Herself	Best Female Vocalist	Won

== Personal life ==
Nzama once dated musician Sir Trill, who according to ZiMoja. In December 2022, the two were reported welcoming a new baby.
