= Mas Musiq =

South African record producer

- Born: Thabo Ngubane; 14 August 1997 (age 29); Tembisa, South Africa
- Genres: Amapiano; Dance/Electronic
- Occupations: DJ; Record producer
- Instruments: Sampler; Piano; DAW
- Years active: 2019–present
- Label: New Money Gang Records

Thabo Ngubane (born 14 August 1997), is a South African DJ and record producer professionally known as Mas Musiq. He came to prominence subsequent to the release of his singles "Sengizwile" and "Uzozisola", of which the latter was certified double platinum by the Recording Industry of South Africa (RiSA).

"Sengizwile" peaked at number 1 on The Official South African Charts, "Uzozisola" peaked at 6, and "Inhliziyo" at 17 as all three singles led a studio album Auti 'eSharp.

His fourth studio album Nini na Nini, was released on 21 April 2023. It was supported by one single "Gangnam Style".

The album was certified Gold by the Recording Industry of South Africa (RiSA).

== Discography ==
=== Studio albums ===
- Mambisa (2019)
- Mambisa II (2020)
- Aut' eSharp (2021)
- Nini Nanini (2023)
- Lane Yam (2024)
- Uju (2026)

=== Extended Plays ===
- Shonamalanga - EP (with Aymos) (2020)
- Bas'tholile - EP (with Daliwonga) (2025)

== Singles ==
=== As lead artist ===
List of singles as lead artist, with selected chart positions and certifications, showing year released and album name
Title	Year	Peak chart positions	Certifications	Album
Title	Year	ZA	Certifications	Album
"10K Yey'nkomo" (Aymos, Mas Musiq, Samthing Soweto featuring Sha Sha)	2024	—		Impilo
"—" denotes a recording that did not chart or was not released in that territory.

== Awards and nominations ==
Year	Award ceremony	Prize	Recipient/Nominated work	Results	Notes
2020	SAMAs	Best Engineered Album	Isphithiphithi	Nominated	
2020	SAMAs	Best Engineered Album	The Return of the Scorpion King	Nominated	
2020	SAMAs	Best Produced Album	Isphithiphithi	Nominated	
2021	SAMAs	Best Amapiano Album	Shonamalanga (EP)	Nominated	
2022	28th South African Music Awards	Best Amapiano Album	Auti 'eSharp	Nominated	
