= Kida Kudz =

Nigerian singer

- Born: Olukayode Odesanya; Lagos, Nigeria
- Origin: Nigeria
- Genres: Afropop
- Occupation: Singer
- Instrument: Vocals
- Label: Disturbing London

Olukayode Odesanya, better known as Kida Kudz, is a Nigerian Afropop singer based in the U.K. He gained recognition after winning the second edition of the Peak Talent Show in 2010. He has collaborated with Ms Banks, Burna Boy, and Octavian, among others.

== Early life ==
He left Nigeria and travelled to the U.K. at the age of 14 to live with his father and step-mother. Kudz found himself fascinated with already established genres in the country, such as grime, U.K. rap and even a touch of chessy pop.

== Music career ==
On 24 June 2022, Kida Kudz released a four track extended play titled World Citizens with Mr Dutch. Rocket Launcher is a track in World Citizens that rides on Afro swing tendencies as it smoothly blends elements of U.K. and Nigerian Afobreats. In 2021, Kida Kudz featured Bella Shmurda in single "Ball Until We Fall".

== Discography ==
=== EP ===
- World Citizen (2022)

=== Single ===
- Animalistic (2021)

=== Mixtape ===
- Nasty (2020)
- Top Memba (2021)
