= Malome Vector =

Mosotho musician (1992–2024)

- Born: Bokang Moleli; 4 July 1992; Roma, Lesotho
- Died: 24 July 2024 (aged 32) N1, Free State, South Africa
- Genres: Afro-Pop; Hip-hop
- Occupation: Singer-songwriter
- Years active: 2006–2024
- Labels: The Whole Time Entertainment; Ambitiouz Entertainment (former)

Bokang Moleli (4 July 1992 – 24 July 2024) known professionally as Malome Vector, was a Mosotho singer-songwriter and rapper. Born and raised in Roma, Maseru, Vector's musical career began at the age of 14 in 2004 as a school choir participant prior to competing on talent shows. Vector was one of the young artists who expressed their culture & language in HipHop music, as in most of his songs he sang in the Sotho language.

Malome relocated to South Africa and signed a recording deal with Ambitiouz Entertainment in 2020. Vector rose to prominence with his debut single "Dumelang" released in 2019 which became commercially successful and certified double platinum in South Africa.

== Career ==
In 2020, Vector relocated to South Africa and signed a recording deal with Ambitiouz Entertainment.

Malome appeared on "Price To Pay" as single by South African DJ Miss Pru along with duo Blaq Diamond released on 8 May 2020.

He received a nomination for Best Artist, Duo or Group in African Traditional at the 2021 All Africa Music Awards.

His debut studio album Karabo which was named after his daughter, was released on 7 January 2022. Karabo debuted at number 1 on iTunes South Africa. It was supported by three singles "Dumelang", "No Body", and "Lerato".

Following the exit from his former recording label, Malome established The Whole Entertainment and began to work on his extended play. In February 2024, he revealed his extended play 1964, via Instagram.

His extended play 1964, was released on 28 March 2024. 1964 is an afro-pop record incorporating the elements of rnb, soul and afro beats.

== Death ==
Vector died in a road collision on 24 July 2024, on N1 in Free State while travelling to Lesotho. Vector was 32 years old.

== Singles ==
=== As lead artist ===
List of singles as lead artist, with selected chart positions and certifications, showing year released and album name
Title	Year	Peak chart positions	Certifications	Album
Title	Year	ZA	Certifications	Album
"Dumelang" (featuring Blaq Diamond)	2019	—	2x Platinum	Karabo
"Follow"	2020	—		Non-album single
"No Body"	2021			Karabo
"Lerato"	2021	—		Karabo
"Ha Hona Taba" (Zinkz Dee, Malome Vector)	2021	—		Non-album single
"Costa" (featuring Dee the General, Lizwi Wokuqala)	2023	—		Non-album single
"My Woman" (Onesimus, Malome Vector featuring Lizwi Wokuqala & Janta MW)	2023	—		Non-album single
"Long Time" (Malome Vector featuring Lizwi Wokuqala, Ntate Stunna	2023	—		Non-album single
"Fancy Life"	2023	—		Non-album single
"Ke Uratile"	2023	—		Non-album single
"X2" (featuring Chvna)	2024	—		Non-album single
"—" denotes a recording that did not chart or was not released in that territory.

== Discography ==
=== Studio albums ===
- Karabo (2022)
- 1964 (2024)

== Awards and nominations ==
=== South African Music Awards ===
Year	Nominee / work	Award	Result	Ref.
2021	"Price to Pay"	Best Music Video of the Year	Won	
2024	Karabo	Rest of Africa	Nominated	
