= Ke Star =

Single by Focalistic

Single by Focalistic featuring Vigro Deep

from the album Blecke
- Released: April 25, 2020
- Recorded: 2020
- Label: 18 Area Holdings
- Songwriter: Focalistic
- Producer: Vigro Deep

"Ke Star" is a single by South African rapper Focalistic. It was released by 18 Area Holdings on April 25, 2020 as lead single from his Extended Play Blecke (2020). It was written by Focalistic and produced by Vigro Deep.

An accompanying music video for the song, directed by Steezus, was released in September 2020. "Ke Star" was certified gold in South Africa and was nominated for Best Amapiano Song, at the 6th Mzansi Kwaito and House Music Awards.

== Commercial performance ==
"Ke Star" remix debuted number 1 on iTunes and Apple Music Top songs charts for 2 consecutive weeks in Nigeria. In the US debuted number 16 on Billboard Top Thriller Charts.

== Accolades ==
"Ke Star" was nominated for Amapiano Song Of the Year and Best Amapiano Music Video at the 1st ceremony of South African Amapiano Music Awards in 2021.

Year	Nominee / work	Award	Result	Ref.
2021	"Ke Star"	Amapiano Song Of the Year	Nominated	
2021	"Ke Star"	Best Amapiano Music Video	Nominated	
2021	"Ke Star"	Best Amapiano Song	Nominated	

== Remix ==
"Ke Star"

Single by Focalistic & Davido featuring Vigro Deep
- Released: 19 February 2021
- Recorded: 2021
- Label: 18 Area Holdings

Davido singles chronology
"Wonder (Remix)" (2021)	"Ke Star (Remix)" (2021)	"Epo" (2021)

"Ke Star" remix by South African rapper Focalistic and Nigerian-American singer Davido featuring South African producer Virgo Deep. It was released on February 19, 2021 by 18 Area Holdings.

The song debuted number 16 on Billboard Top Triller Global chart in the U.S.

== Track listing ==
- Digital download
1. "Ke Star" (Blecke EP Version) – 4:51
- Digital download (Davido)
1. "Black and Yellow" (Davido and Focalistic) (featuring Virgo Deep) – 5:28

== Certifications and sales ==
Region	Certification	Certified units/Sales
South Africa (RiSA)	Gold	25,000+
