= Teargas (musical ensemble) =

South African musical group

- Origin: Gauteng, South Africa
- Genre: Hip-hop
- Instruments: Vocals; DAW
- Years active: 2004–2014
- Labels: Electromode music; Cashtime Life
- Past members: K.O; Ma-E; Ntukza

Teargas was a South African musical ensemble comprising K.O and brothers, Ntukza and Ma-E. The trio officially emerged in post-2004, signed a recording deal with Electromode Music and released debut studio album K’shubile K’bovu (2006).

== History ==
The trio met at Vaal Triangle Technikon in Vanderbijl park K.O (born Ntokozo Mdluli), Ma-E (born Ezee Hanabe), and Ntukza (born Bantu Hanabe) and signed a record deal with Electro Mode in 2005. Their debut studio album K’shubile K’bovu was released in July 2006 to critical acclaim. The album produced a single "Chance", which was nominated for Song of the Year at the 2007 South African Music Awards. Teargas second album Wafa Wafa was released on May 15, 2008. The album was fused with Kwaito elements and won Best Rap Album at 2008 South African Music Awards.

Their third studio album Dark and Blue was released in 2009 and became certified gold with sales of 25,000 units in South Africa. The album was nominated for Album of the Year at 16th Annual South African Music Awards.

In 2010, the group was nominated for Best International Act at Bet Awards.

== Discography ==
Title	Type	Album details	Certification
K'shubile K'bovu	Studio album	Release date: 7 July 2006; Label: Electromode Music; Format: Digital download, CD	
Wafa Wafa	Studio album	Release date: 24 March 2008; Label: Electromode Music; Format: Digital download, CD	
Dark or Blue	Studio album	Release date: 9 November 2009; Label: Electromode Music; Format: Digital download, CD	
Numb8r Numb8r	Studio album	Release date: 23 August 2012; Label: Electromode Music; Format: Digital download, CD	

== Awards and nominations ==
Year	Award ceremony	Prize	Recipient/Nominated work	Results	Ref.
2006	Metro FM Music Awards	Best Album	K’shubile K’bovu	Won	
2006	Metro FM Music Awards	Best Hip-hop song	"Chance"	Won	
2006	Metro FM Music Awards	Song of the Year	"Chance"	Won	
2007	SAMAs	Song of the Year	"Chance"	Nominated	
2007	Channel O Music Video Awards	Best Video by a Group or Duo	"Chance"	Nominated	
2008	Metro FM Music Awards	Best Group	"Wafa Wafa"	Won	
2008	Metro FM Music Awards	Best Hip-hop	"Wafa Wafa"	Nominated	
2009	Hype Awards	Best Group	"Go Away"	Nominated	
2009	Hype Awards	Best Video	"Go Away"	Nominated	
2009	Channel O Music Video Awards	Best Video Southern Africa	"Take You Out"	Won	
2009	SAMAs	Best Rap	"Wafa Wafa"	Won	
2010	SAMAs	Best Rap	Dark or Blue	Won	
2010	SAMAs	Album of the Year	Dark or Blue	Nominated	
2010	SAMAs	Best Group or Duo	Themselves	Nominated	
2010	Channel O Music Video Awards	Most Gifted Video	"Party 101"	Won	
2010	SoundCity Music Awards	Best Cinematography	"Mhlobo Wami"	Nominated	
2010	MTV Africa Music Awards	Best Group	Themselves	Nominated	
2011	BET Awards	Best International Act: African	Themselves	Nominated	
2011	Channel O Music Video Awards	Most Gifted Duo, Group or Video Featuring Artist	"Born For This"	Nominated	
