= Young Stunna =

South African singer (born 1997)

- Born: 17 November 1997 (age 28); Daveyton, Gauteng, South Africa
- Origin: South Africa
- Genre: Amapiano
- Occupation: Singer
- Instrument: Vocals
- Years active: 2020–present
- Label: Piano Hub

Sandile Fortune Msimango (born 17 November 1997), known professionally as Young Stunna, is a South African Amapiano singer. He is known for his hit singles "Bopha" and "Adiwele". He has also extensively worked with record producers DJ Maphorisa and Kabza De Small.

Stunna's debut studio album Notumato (2021), reached number 1 in South Africa. Notumato became his first commercially successful album which helped him gain recognition, and it was certified Platinum by Recording Industry of South Africa (RiSA).

== Early life ==
Sandile Fortune Msimango was born in Daveyton, South Africa and grew up in a Christian family and often sang in his church's choir. His mother was a vocalist and his father owned a tavern which had a jukebox. Spending time at the tavern on weekends exposed him to all types of genres, including RnB and Kwaito. He attended Benoni West Primary and Lee Rand High School in Benoni and completed his matric at Unity Secondary School in Daveyton.

== Career ==
Stunna started making music at the age 13 and took the decision to pursue music as a career. He was initially a hip-hop musician from 2012 before switching to amapiano. He got the name Young Stunna from his fans in Daveyton where he grew up. He rose to fame earlier in 2021 as part of the piano hub roster-when he featured on Felo Le Tee and Mellow & Sleazy's smash amapiano hit, "Bopha".

In October 2021, he released his debut album, Notumato, which features South African musicians DJ Maphorisa, Blxckie, Sizwe Alakaine, and Kabza De Small. The album debuted on number 1 and was certified Platinum by the Recording Industry of South Africa (RiSA).

His single Adiwele reached number 1 across SA radio with a total 23.4 million impressions.

Towards the end of April 2022, Stunna was featured by Spotify on the documentary Freedom Sounds: From Kwaito to Amapiano.

In August 2023, Stunna announced his upcoming second studio album and its lead single "uNonkosi". The song was released on 18 August 2023 and is a tribute to the Msimango family and his clan, the Nonkosi.

== Awards ==
=== African Entertainment Awards USA ===
Year	Nominee / work	Award	Result	Ref.
2024	Himself	Best Male Artist - East/South/North Africa	Nominated	

=== BET Awards ===
Year	Nominee / work	Award	Result	Ref.
2022	Himself	Best New International Act	Nominated	

=== Dstv Mzansi Viewer's Choice Awards ===
Year	Nominee / work	Award	Result	Ref.
2022	"Adiwele"	Favourite Song of the Year	Nominated	

=== Feather Awards ===
Year	Nominee / work	Award	Result	Ref.
2024	Himself	Musician of the Year	Nominated	

=== Metro FM Music Awards ===
Year	Nominee / work	Award	Result	Ref.
2024	"Imithandazo"	Song of the Year	Won	
2024	"Imithandazo"	Best Collaboration	Won	
2024	"Imithandazo"	Best Amapiano	Won	

=== South African Music Awards ===
Year	Nominee / work	Award	Result	Ref.
2022	Notumato	Best Selling Artist	Won	
2024	"Imithandazo"	Motsepe Foundation Record of the Year	Nominated	
2024	"Sengizwile"	RAV Music Video of the Year	Nominated	

== Discography ==
- Notumato (2021)
- Busisiwe (2026)

== Singles ==
=== As lead artist ===
List of singles as lead artist, with selected chart positions and certifications, showing year released and album name
Title	Year	Peak chart positions	Certifications	Album
Title	Year	ZA	Certifications	Album
"Been Right"	2023	—		Non-album single
"uNonkosi" (Young Stunna featuring Deeper Phil & Mfundo Da DJ)	2023	—		Non-album single
"Traboski (Remix Coke Studio Africa 2023)" (Bnxn, Young Stunna, Nikita Kering’)	2023	—		Non-album single
"Bayabuza" (Pervader, Young Stunna featuring Kabza De Small, SLY)	2023	—		Non-album single
"Monday Boys Holiday" (Xduppy, Young Stunna, Thuto The Human featuring DJ Maphorisa)	2023	—		Non-album single
"Ilanga (Riky Rick, Tyler ICU, Young Stunna featuring Kelvin Momo, Baby S.O.N, Zadok, Mas Musiq)	2024	—		Non-album single
"Kwagcwala kangaka"	2024	—		Non-album single
"HELLO (INDABA)" (FREE THE Youth, Young Stunna featuring SCOOBY STEEZE, ShaunMusiQ & Tears, Visca] - Single	2024	—		Non-album single
"Mjolo (Part 2)" (TOSS, Scotts Maphuma & Young Stunna featuring DJ Maphorisa, Uncool MC, Cuba Beats, Tyler ICU & Sbu YDN)	2025			
"—" denotes a recording that did not chart or was not released in that territory.

=== As featured artist ===
List of singles as featured artist, with selected chart positions and certifications, showing year released and album name
Title	Year	Peak chart positions	Certifications	Album
Title	Year	ZA	Certifications	Album
"Basha" (Visca, Ntwana JR, Jnr Richie featuring Young Stunna, Toss, PRVIS3)	2024	—		Non-album single
"Bang'bize (Leehleza, Kabza De Small featuring Young Stunna)	2024	—		Non-album single
"Kabza Chant ( Kabza De Small featuring Young Stunna, Nkosazana Daughter, Mthunzi, Nokwazi, Anzo, Mashudu, Murumba Pitch, Tman Xpress)	2024	1		Non-album single
"Tholakuwe" (Herc Cut The Lights, Sjava featuring Young Stunna)	2024	—		Non-album single
"Wishi Wishi" (Kabza De Small, DJ Maphorisa featuring Scotts Maphuma, Young Stunna)	2024	2		Non-album single
"Diwa Kae" (De Mthuda featuring Kabza De Small, Young Stunna, Mkeyz, Mckenzie, Mthunzi)	2024	—		Non-album single
"—" denotes a recording that did not chart or was not released in that territory.
