= Focalistic =

South African rapper

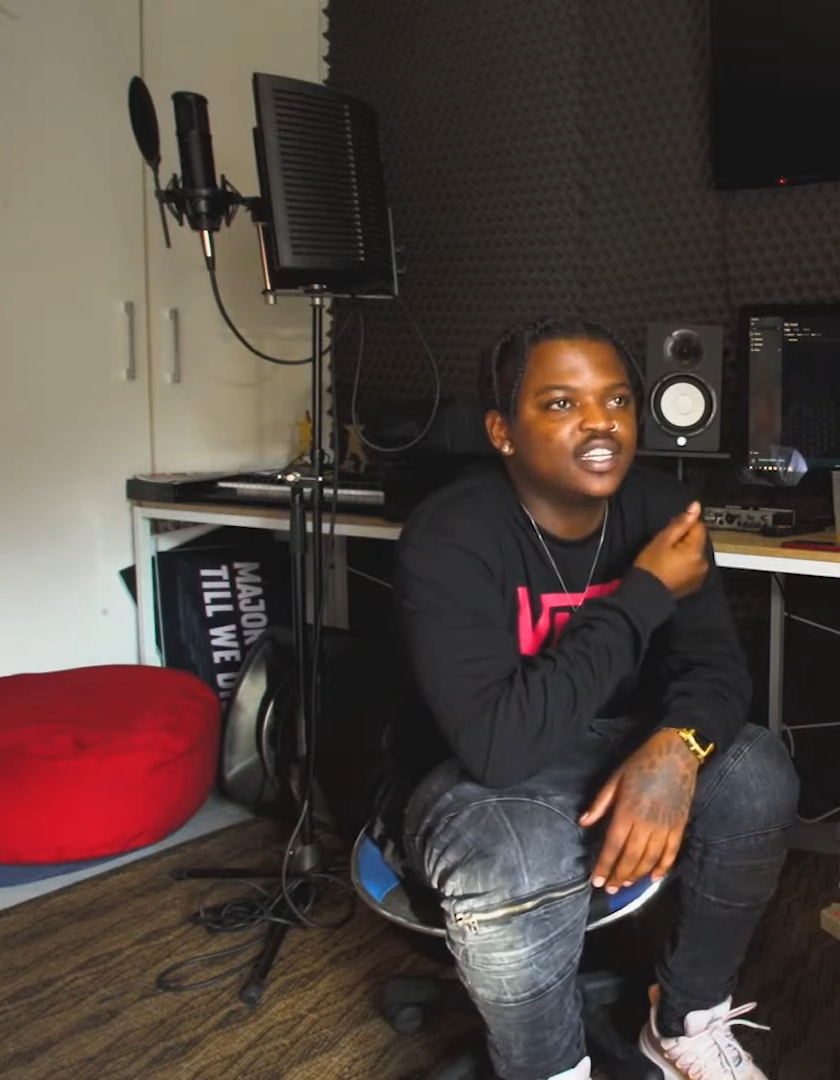
- Born: Lethabo Sebetso; 28 May 1996 (age 30); Ga-Rankuwa, Pretoria, South Africa
- Other names: Pitori Maradona, President ya Straata
- Education: University of Pretoria (political science)
- Occupations: Rapper; singer
- Partner: Pabi Cooper (2022
- Musical career
- Genres: Amapiano, hip hop
- Instrument: Vocals
- Years active: 2016–present
- Label: 18 Area Holdings

Lethabo Sebetso (born 26 May 1996), professionally known as Focalistic, is a South African rapper. He rose to prominence after his single "Ke Star", reached number 16 on Billboard Top Triller Global charts. Born and raised in Pretoria, Sebetso was a footballer prior pursuing a music career as a rapper, released his debut studio album Sgubhu Ses Excellent (2020).

== Career ==
Lethabo Sebetso born on 26 May 1996 in Zone 2, Ga-Rankuwa, Pretoria; His father, Kgomotso Sebetso was a former political journalist at the South African Broadcasting Corporation SABC. Lethabo graduated at the University of Pretoria in political science degree. In 2016, he won Artist on Rise competition. His single "Fak'mali" debuted number 1 on YFM Hip Hop music charts. In early 2020, he established his own record label 18 Area Holdings in partnership with The Vth Seasons. On 10 April 2020, his Extended Play Quarantined Tarantino was released. In April 2020, his single "Ke Star" featuring Vigro Deep was released. "Ke Star" was certified gold with sales of 25 000 copies.

In November 2020, he joined RADAR African programme by Spotify. Focalistic revealed track listing and announced release date in 25 November. Sghubu Ses Excellent was released on 4 December 2020.

In February 2021, his remix "Ke Star", featuring Davido and Vigro Deep was released globally. The single received enormous international success and charted at number 16 on Billboard Top Triller Global chart in the U.S. At 2021 All Africa Music Awards he received seven nominations in the Best male artiste, Artiste of the Year, Best African collaborations, Best Artiste African dance, Best Artiste in African Electro, Break out artiste of the year, Song of the Year.

In early September 2021, he headlined to AmaFest Tour in the UK, to further promote Amapiano genre. In 27 September, his studio Extended Play, President Ya Straata, was released with its lead single, "16 Days No Sleep", featuring Kabza De Small, DJ Maphorisa and Mellow & Sleazy. Focalistic was nominated for Best African Act at MTV Europe Music Awards in 2021.

In early March 2022, Focalistic performed at O2 Arena in London alongside with Nigerian singer Davido.

In 1 May, he embarked on North American Tour, the tour will visit 12 cities includes; Washington D.C, Houston, Dallas, Orlando, Minnesota, Los Angeles, San Francisco, Chicago, Atlanta and New York.

In October 15, he announced his studio album Ghetto Gospel which was set to be released on November 18, 2022.

"Tabela Hape" featuring Kabza de Small, Mellow & Sleazy, and Myztro was released on October 28, 2022, as album's lead single.

In early 2025 he announced his joint studio album with Ch'cco titled Based On A True Story (B.O.A.T.S) which was set to be released on 05 September 2025.

== Personal life ==
His father Kgomotso Sebetso died in a car accident in his hometown of Ga-Rankuwa in 2011. Focalistic dated South African DJ DBN Gogo.

== Discography ==
- Sgubu ses Excellent (2020)
- President Ya Straata (2021)
- Ghetto Gospel (2022)
- 13POS (2024)
- B.O.A.T.S with Ch'cco (2025)

== Singles ==
=== As featured artist ===
List of singles as featured artist, with selected chart positions and certifications, showing year released and album name
Title	Year	Peak chart positions	Certifications	Album
Title	Year	ZA	Certifications	Album
"Biri Marung" (Mr Pilato, Ego Slimflow, Tebogo G Mashego featuring Sje Konka, Focalistic, DJ Maphorisa, Scotts Maphuma,	2024	1	Platinum	Non-album single
"—" denotes a recording that did not chart or was not released in that territory.

== Awards and nominations ==
=== All Africa Music Awards ===
Year	Nominee / work	Award	Result	Ref.
2022	Himself	Best Male Artist in Southern Africa	Nominated	

=== African Entertainment Awards USA ===
Year	Nominee / work	Award	Result	Ref.
2024	Himself	Best Male Artist - East/South/North Africa	Nominated	

=== African Muzik Magazine Awards ===
Year	Nominee / work	Award	Result	Ref.
2021	Ke star (Remix)"	Best Collaboration	Won	
2021	Ke star (Remix)"	Best Male Southern Africa	Won	
2021	Ke star (Remix)"	Song of the Year	Nominated	

=== BET Awards ===
Year	Nominee / work	Award	Result	Ref.
2024	Himself	Best New International Act	Nominated	

=== Headies ===
Year	Nominee / work	Award	Result	Ref.
2022	Himself	Best Southern African Artiste Of The Year	Won	
2023	Himself	Best Southern African Artiste Of The Year	Won	

=== Nickelodeon Kids' Choice Awards ===
Year	Nominee / work	Award	Result	Ref.
2022	Himself	Favourite African Star	Nominated	

=== Vodafone Ghana Music Awards ===
Year	Nominee / work	Award	Result	Ref.
2022	Himself	Best African Artist	Nominated	

=== South African Music Awards ===
Year	Nominee / work	Award	Result	Ref.
2022	President Ya Straata	Best Amapiano Album	Nominated	
