= Tsonga =

Tsonga may refer to:

- Tsonga language, a Bantu language spoken in southern Africa
- Tsonga people, a large group of people living mainly in southern Mozambique and South Africa.
- Jo-Wilfried Tsonga (born 1985), French tennis player

== See also ==
- Dzongkha, a Sino-Tibetan language
