= Tyler ICU =

South African record producer

Austin Khulani Baloyi, professionally known under the alias of Tyler ICU, is a South African DJ and record producer born and raised in Kempton park, Gauteng. He rose to prominence subsequent to the release of "Mnike" which was certified platinum in South Africa, and peaked at number one for sixteen consecutive weeks on The Official South African Charts and Billboard South Africa songs.

Baloyi was introduced to the mainstream in 2020 when he put out his single "Bella Ciao" with Nicole Elocin alongside DJ Maphorisa and Kabza de Small which led an extended play Money Heist. In 2021 he released "Banyana" with DJ Maphorisa which was certified double platinum.

== Awards and nominations ==
Tyler ICU was nominated for Best African Act at the 2023 MTV Europe Music Awards amid the success of "Mnike". Unfortunately on 19 October Paramount Global announced that the ceremony was canceled, due to the Gaza war.

Year	Award ceremony	Prize	Recipient/Nominated work	Results	Ref.
2022	South African Music Awards	TikTok Viral Song of the Year	"Banyana"	Nominated	
2022	South African Music Awards	Record of the Year	"Banyana"	Nominated	
2022	South African Music Awards	Record of the Year	"Izolo"	Won	
2022	South African Music Awards	Music Video of the Year	"Izolo"	Nominated	
2022	South African Music Awards	Music Video of the Year	"Buyile"	Nominated	
2023	MTV Europe Music Awards	Best African Act	Himself	Cancelled	
2024	Metro FM Music Awards	Best Collaboration	"Mnike"	Nominated	
2024	Metro FM Music Awards	Best Amapiano	"Mnike"	Nominated	
2024	Metro FM Music Awards	Best Viral Challenge	"Mnike"	Nominated	
2024	Metro FM Music Awards	Best Collaboration	"Mnike"	Nominated	
2024	Metro FM Music Awards	Song of the Year	"Mnike"	Nominated	
2024	Metro FM Music Awards	Song of the Year	"Dalie"	Nominated	
2024	Metro FM Music Awards	Best Music Video	"Dalie"	Nominated	
2024	Metro FM Music Awards	Artist of the Year	Himself	Nominated	
2024	DStv Content Creator Awards	Song of the Year	"Mnike"	Won	
2024	African Entertainment Awards USA	Song of the Year	"Dalie"	Pending	
