= Blaq Diamond =

South African Afro pop duo, song writers, and producers

- Origin: Ladysmith KwaZulu-Natal
- Genres: R&B; Afro-pop
- Years active: 2011–present
- Labels: Ambitiouz Entertainment (Former); Umuthi Records (Current)
- Members: Ndumiso Mdletshe; Sphelele Dunywa

Blaq Diamond (stylized BlaQ Diamond) is a South African Afro pop duo from Ladysmith KwaZulu-Natal. They met in 2010 on a school trip where both participated in a music cypher in the school bus. They signed to record label Ambitiouz Entertainment, releasing their debut album Inqola (2017), which became their first iTunes number one.

The band first gained prominence for their single "Ibhanoyi" released 2019, which received "SAMA Record of the Year".

Their second studio album Umuthi (2020), spawned two platinum selling singles "Ibhanoyi" and "Love Letter".

== History ==
=== 2010–2017 ===
In 2010, they met while on a school trip where they participated in a rap cypher in the school bus and began spending more time together, participating in school functions which earned them recognition in the community and local surroundings. The two decided to move to Johannesburg for better musical prospects which proved difficult at first as, not knowing anyone, forced them to get jobs to earn an income which was used to sustain their musical ambitions.

=== 2017–2019:Inqola ===
In early 2017, the duo signed a record deal with Ambitiouz Entertainment and began to work on the debut album. In June 19, their album's lead single "Sthandwa" was released followed by second single "Emzini kaBaba" which was accompanied by music video. In the winter of 2017, they released their debut album Inqola to critical acclaim. The album is a fusion of Afro-soul with Maskandi and umBhaqanga fusion which they made sound modern and youthful. At the 24th South African Music Awards, they received two SAMA Awards nominations. In 2018, they performed for the first time in Piertermaritzburg invited by a local event group to perform in a fashion show

=== 2019–2020: Umuthi ===
On May 2, 2019, their single "Memeza" featuring Sjava was released, as album's lead single. The song peaked number 9 on Radio Airplay Charts. In August 2, their second single "Ibhanoyi" was released. The song peaked number one iTunes charts. At the 26th ceremony of South African Music Awards, "Ibhanoyi" won Record of the Year.

On January 23, 2020, their third single "Love Letter" was released. The song peaked number 3 on iTunes charts and number 11 on Radio Airplay Charts.

On 31 January 2020, their second studio album Umuthi was released. The album features Sjava, Ci Ci, Thee legacy and Igcokama Elisha. The album produced three singles "Memeza", "Love Letter" and "Ibhanoyi. The album debuted at number 1 on iTunes Albums Charts.

In June 2020, they established Umuthi Records joint-venture with Ambitiouz Entertainment. In mid of 2020, the duo made collaboration on "Price to pay" and "Uhulumeni" by DJ Miss Pru. In November 20, their single "Summer YoMuthi" was released and debuted number one on Channel 0 Top 30 music chart.

=== 2021–2024: Zulu Romance ===
In June 4, they released a single "Messiah" featuring Dumi Mkokstad. The song gained 3 million views on YouTube.

At the 6th ceremony of All Africa Music Awards their song "Summer YoMuthi" received eight nominations including; Best Male Artist in Southern Africa, Artist of the Year in Africa; Song of the Year in Africa; Producer of the Year in Africa; Best Male Artiste in African Inspirational Music; Breakout Artiste of the Year; Best Artiste, Duo or Group in African Pop; Best African Duo, Group or Band. In October 29, their single "Italy" was released.

In December 2021, the duo left Ambitiouz Entertainment.

In early September 2022, they announced a single "Qoma" featuring South African singers Big Zulu and Siya Ntuli on Instagram.

Zulu Romance was released on February 29, 2024. The album is an afro-pop record fused with maskandi and isichathamiya elements. It is supported by two singles "Qoma", and "Mangibona Wena".

=== 2026-present: Upcoming album ===
Towards the end of January 2026, the duo and Mlindo The Vocalist announced the working on their upcoming collaborative studio album Omkhaya, alongside with Omkhaya Tour which includes two dates; May 2, 2026 at Langa Stadium, Cape Town followed by Carnival City Big Top Arena, Johannesburg on June 6, 2026.

== Group members ==
=== Current members ===
- Ndumiso Mdletshe - (2010–present)
- Siphelele Dunywa - (2010–present)

== Discography ==
- Inqola (2017)
- Umuthi (2020)
- Zulu Romance (2024)

== Awards and nominations ==
Year	Award Ceremony	Category	Results	Ref.
2020	SAMA	Song of the year	Won	
2020	SAMA	Afro pop Album of the Year	Nominated	
2020	KZN Entertainment Awards	Newest Find	Nominated	
2021	MTV Africa Music Awards 2021	Best Group	Won	
2021	SAMA 27	Artist of the Year	Won	
2021	AFRIMMA	Best Male Artiste in Southern Africa	Won	
2021	AFRIMMA	Artiste of the Year in Africa	Nominated	
2021	AFRIMMA	Song of the Year in Africa	Won	
2021	AFRIMMA	Producer of the Year in Africa	Nominated	
2021	AFRIMMA	Best Male Artiste in African Inspirational Music	Nominated	
2021	AFRIMMA	Breakout Artiste of the Year	Nominated	
2021	AFRIMMA	Best Artiste, Duo or Group in African Pop	Nominated	
2021	AFRIMMA	Best African Duo, Group or Band	Nominated	
2024	SATMA	Best Traditional Collaboration	Pending	
