= Kabza de Small =

South African DJ & Record producer

Kabza De Small
- Born: Kabelo Petrus Motha; 27 November 1992 (age 33) eMalahleni, Mpumalanga, South Africa
- Occupations: DJ; record producer
- Spouse: Kamogelo Geloo Moropa (m. 2023)
- Musical career
- Genres: Amapiano; house
- Instruments: Keyboards; piano; drum machine; electronic drums; synthesizer
- Years active: 2011–present
- Labels: Piano Hub (current); Bestbyfar (former)

Kabelo Petrus Motha (born 27 November 1992) is a South African DJ, record producer,and a record label owner popularly known as Kabza de Small. He is a major figure in the amapiano genre of house music. Aside from his solo career, Motha is a member of the Scorpion Kings. Motha gained international recognition after the release of "Umshove", in 2018.

Kabza's third studio album I Am the King of Amapiano: Sweet & Dust (2020), debuted number one in South Africa.

Forbes Africa ranked Motha number 18 on Forbes Africa 30 under 30. His accolades include Seventeen South African Music Awards, five Metro FM Music Awards, three AmaPiano Music Awards, two Mzansi Viewers Choice Awards, one Sunday Times GenNext, and one Dance Music Awards South Africa.

== Life and career ==
Born and raised in eMalahleni, Mpumalanga, later Motha with his brother Sphelele Xaki who is an Electrical engineer and philanthropist relocated to Pretoria. His musical career began in 2009. He was signed under Tyrique de Bruyne and released his first album Avenue Sound in 2016 under Bestbyfar Records. Kabza established his own record label PianoHub.

His breakthrough single "Umshove" featuring South African singer Leehleza was released in 2018. On 1 October 2019, he released Piano Hub with DJ Maphorisa. The EP was certified 3× platinum in South Africa. The Return of Scorpion Kings was released on 29 November 2019.

On 31 January 2020, Scorpion Kings (Kabza de Small and DJ Maphorisa) announced Scorpion King Live, which was set to be 11 April, at Sun Arena, Times Square in Pretoria. The concert was postponed due to the COVID-19 outbreak, and was rescheduled to 9 August.

His studio album I Am the King of Amapiano: Sweet & Dust, was released on 26 June 2020. The album was certified double platinum in South Africa. In December 2020, Kabza was listed as the most streamed South African artist by Spotify. That same month, Kabza announced collaborative studio album Rumble in the Jungle, and released lead single "Funu", featuring Afro-pop singer Tresor in February 2021. Rumble in the Jungle, a collaborative studio album by Kabza de Small, DJ Maphorisa, and Tresor was released on 9 April 2021.

Motha was ranked at number 18 on Forbes Africa's 30 under 30 list in June 2021.

In July 2021, he was featured on Rolling Stone magazine for his musical career.

On 27 September, Kabza and DJ Maphorisa released "Abalele" featuring South African singer Ami Faku. The song debuted number 4 on the Spotify charts and number 1 on the official South African Music Charts.

Kabza appeared on a collaboration "Siyabonga", with DJ Zinhle, Nokwazi, and Black Motion released on 26 November 2021. The song debuted number 24 on both Local and International streaming charts.

In early January 2022, he announced his album KOA II Part 1, on his Instagram account. The album was set to be released on 16 June 2022.

His studio EP Ziwangale was released on 22 April 2022. Its lead single "Ziwa Ngale" featuring DJ Tira, DJ Exit SA, Beast, Mshunqisi, Young Stunna, and Felo Le Tee, charted number on iTune SA music charts.

The other three songs, "Ebusuku" featuring Nkosazana Daughter, "Kabza" featuring Murumba Pitch, and "Mak'shoni" Langa" featuring DJ Maphorisa, Murumba Pitch, and Da Muziqal Chef, debuted at number 7, number 12 and number 26 respectively, on iTunes music chart.

On 31 May, Kabza released 6 singles; "Khusela" featuring Msaki, "Bathini" featuring Young Stunna and Artwork Sounds, and "Isoka" featuring Nkosazana Daughter and Murumba Pitch, as part 1 of his album.

KOA II Part 1 (pronounced King of Amapiano 2 Part 1) was released on 16 June 2022.

The album debuted number 11 on iTunes top 100 chart, and "Khusela" peaked number 1 on Apple Music charts.

In June 2022, Motha announced a 3 leg tour that ran from 24 to 26 June.

In early October 2022, he announced he was working on his EP via Twitter, and released a lead single "K'shubile" with Kwesta featuring Masterpiece YVK. In November 2022, he worked with Afrika Memani on the Road To Private EP, which was released on 4 November.

Scorpion Kings announced Summer Tour which includes 9 dates, it ran from 11 December at Cape Town until 25 February 2023, Gauteng.

Kabza reportedly working on joint extended play together with Ami Faku, announced on his Twitter account on 13 February 2023. Release date and EP title are yet to be announced.

In May 2023, he collaborated with DJ Maphorisa to release a 25 track mixtape project titled The Konka Mixtape (Sweet & Dust) Album.

In early July 2023, Kabza was reported as a producer of Drake's It's All a Blur Tour.

"Isibusiso" featuring South African singer Mthunzi was released on 20 October 2023 as a lead single ahead of his extended play Isimo. The EP was released on 27 October 2023.

In April 2024, his show Redbull Symphonic with Ofentse Pitse and Symphonic Orchestra was sold out in 5 hours, becoming the first artist to do so. It was held at Lyric Theatre, Gold Reef City, Johannesburg on 8 June 2024. Following the success of his first show, Redbull Symphonic added second show which was sold out in 8 minutes broke second record for him, was held on 9 June.

"Kabza Chant" featuring Young Stunna, Nkosazana Daughter, Mthunzi, Nokwazi, Anzo, Mashudu, Marumba Pitch, and Tman X-Press was released on 7 June 2024. It debuted at number 1 on SA Spotify Daily Charts.

His studio album Bab' Motha was released on July 18, 2025. The album debuted number 9 on Spotify Top Global Album Charts, becoming his first album to top that chart.

In early March 2026, Kabza announced his upcoming studio album Tutu, via Instagram and released "Impilo" with Mkeyz as albums leads single. The album is scheduled for release on June 5, 2026.

== Business Ventures ==
Motha launched a new recording label Tech Hub and announced labels first signee Jnr SA, in early July 2026.

== Awards and nominations ==
=== All Africa Music Awards ===
Year	Nominee / work	Award	Result	Ref.
2022	"Adiwele"	African Fans Favourite	Nominated	
2022	KOA II	Album of the Year	Nominated	
2022	Himself	Artist of the Year	Nominated	

=== Dance Music Awards South Africa ===
Year	Nominee / work	Award	Result	Ref.
2019	"Amantombazane"	Best Amapiano Record	Won	

=== DStv Mzansi Viewers' Choice Awards ===
Year	Nominee / work	Award	Result	Ref.
2020	"Nana Thula"	Favourite Song of the Year	Nominated	
2020	Himself	Favourite Rising Star	Won	
2020	Himself	Favourite DJ	Won	
2022	"Asibe Happy"	Favourite Song	Nominated	
2022	Scorpion Kings (Kabza de Small and DJ Maphorisa)	Favourite music artist/group	Nominated	
2022	Scorpion Kings (Kabza de Small and DJ Maphorisa)	Favourite DJ	Nominated	

=== South African Amapiano Music Awards ===
Year	Nominee / work	Award	Result	Ref.
2021	Scorpion Kings Live	Amapiano Album of the Year	Nominated	
2021	Scorpion Kings	Best Amapiano Male DJ Act	Won	
2021	Himself	Best Amapiano Music Producer	Won	
2021	"Emcimbini"	Best Amapiano Collaboration	Won	
2023	"Abalele"	Song of the Year	Cancelled	
2023	"Asibe Happy"	Song of the Year	Cancelled	
2023	"Khusela" featuring Msaki	Song of the Year	Cancelled	
2023	"Khusela" featuring Msaki	Best AmaPiano Produced Song	Cancelled	
2023	"Khusela" featuring Msaki	Best Amapiano Collaboration	Cancelled	
2023	"Asibe Happy"	Best Amapiano Collaboration	Cancelled	
2023	KOA II Part 1	Best AmaPiano Album/Ep	Cancelled	
2023	Himself	Best AmaPiano Producer	Cancelled	
2023	Himself	AmaPiano Artist of the Year	Cancelled	

=== South African Music Awards ===
Year	Nominee / work	Award	Result	Ref.
2020	Scorpion Kings (DJ Maphorisa, Kabza De Small, MFR Souls & Vigro Deep)	Album of the Year	Won	
2020	Scorpion Kings (DJ Maphorisa, Kabza De Small, MFR Souls & Vigro Deep)	Best Kwaito/Gqom/Amapiano	Nominated	
2020	The Return of the Scorpion Kings (Kabza De Small and DJ Maphorisa)	Best Kwaito/Gqom/Amapiano	Nominated	
2021	Once Upon A Time in Lockdown – Kabza De Small & DJ Maphorisa (Scorpion Kings)	Album of the year	Won	
2021	I Am The King of Amapiano: Sweet & Dust	Album of the year	Nominated	
2021	I Am The King of Amapiano: Sweet & Dust	Male Artist of the Year	Won	
2021	Once Upon A Time in Lockdown (Scorpion Kings)	Duo/Group of the Year	Won	
2021	Once Upon A Time in Lockdown (Scorpion Kings)	Best Amapiano Album	Won	
2021	I Am The King of Amapiano: Sweet & Dust	Best Amapiano Album	Nominated	
2022	"Asibe Happy"	Record of the Year	Nominated	
2022	"Abalele"	Record of the Year	Nominated	
2022	"Abalele"	Most Streamed Song of the Year	Won	
2023	Speak N Vrostaan (with Kwesta)	Best Kwaito Album	Won	
2023	KOA II Part 1	Best Produced Album	Won	
2023	KOA II Part 1	Best Amapiano Album	Won	
2023	Scorpion Kings Live Sun Arena (with DJ Maphorisa)	Duo/Group of the Year	Won	
2024	"Kulula"	RiSA Audio Visual Music Video of the Year	Nominated	
2024	"Nana Thula"	Motsepe Foundation Record of the Year	Nominated	
2024	"Gangnam Style"	Motsepe Foundation Record of the Year	Nominated	
2024	"Imithandazo"	Motsepe Foundation Record of the Year	Nominated	
2024	"Imithandazo"	Best Collaboration	Nominated	
2024	Isimo	Motsweding FM Best Amapiano Album	Won	
2024	Isimo	Radio 2000 Duo/Group of the Year	Won	
2024	Isimo	SAMPRA Album of the Year	Won	
2026	Bab' Motha	Best Amapiano Album	Won	
2026	Bab' Motha	Best Engineered Album	Nominated	
2026	"Abantwana Bakho	Most Streamed Song of the Year	Won	
2026	"Abantwana Bakho	Best Collaboration	Won	
2026	"Dlala Ka Yona"	Best Collaboration	Nominated	
2026	"Eningi (Remix)"	Remix of the Year	Won	

=== Sunday Times GenNext ===
Year	Nominee / work	Award	Result	Ref.
2021	Himself	Coolest Local Club DJ	Won	

=== Trace Awards ===
Year	Nominee / work	Award	Result	Ref.
2025	"Imithandazo"	Best DJ	Nominated	
2025	"Imithandazo"	Best Producer	Nominated	

=== Urban Music Awards ===
Year	Nominee / work	Award	Result	Ref.
2025	Himself	Artist of the Year	Pending	
2025	Isimo	Best Album	Pending	
2025	Isimo	Best Collaboration	Pending	
2025	Himself	Best Amapiano Act	Pending	
2025	Himself	Best Male Act	Pending	
2025	Himself	Best Producer	Pending	
2025	"A-Z (Yashi Moto)"	Best Music Video	Pending	

=== Mzansi Kwaito and House Music Awards ===
Year	Nominee / work	Award	Result	Ref.
2021	"Emcimbini"	Most Voted Song	Nominated	

=== Metro FM Music Awards ===
Year	Nominee / work	Award	Result	Ref.
2023	"Khusela" featuring Msaki	Song of the Year	Nominated	
2023	"Khusela" featuring Msaki	Best Amapiano Song	Nominated	
2023	"Mrholo Wayizolo" Kabza de Small & Kwesta	Best Kwaito/Gqom	Nominated	
2023	"Mrholo Wayizolo" Kabza de Small & Kwesta	Best duo/Group Song	Nominated	
2023	Himself	Best Male Artist	Nominated	
2024	"Imithandazo"	Song of the Year	Won	
2024	"Imithandazo"	Best Collaboration	Won	
2024	"Imithandazo"	Best Amapiano	Won	
2024	Isimo	Best Produced Album	Won	
2024	Himself	Best Male	Nominated	
2025	Himself	Best Male	Nominated	
2025	Himself	Artist of the Year	Nominated	
2025	"Hayi Baba"	Best Dance Song	Won	
2025	"Wishi Wishi"	Best Collaboration Song	Nominated	
2025	"Wishi Wishi"	Best Viral Challenge	Nominated	
2025	"Wishi Wishi"	Song of the Year	Nominated	
2026	Himself	Best Male Artist	Pending	
2026	Bab' Motha	Best Produced Album	Pending	
2026	"Abantwana Bakho"	Song of the Year	Pending	
2026	"Abantwana Bakho"	Best Amapiano	Pending	
2026	"Ngiyozama"	Best Amapiano	Pending	

=== Listicles ===
Name of publisher, name of listicle, year(s) listed, and placement result
Publisher	Year	Listicle	Placement	Ref.
Forbes	2021	30 Under 30	Placed	

== Honors ==
- Musician of the Year- presented Bisquit: Kabza De Small — GQ South Africa (2024)

== Discography ==
=== Studio albums ===
- Avenue Sound (2016)
- Pretty Girls Love Amapiano (2019)
- Pretty Girls Love Amapiano 2 (2020)
- I Am the King of Amapiano: Sweet & Dust (2020)
- Pretty Girls Love Amapiano 3 (with MDU aka TRP)
- KOA II Part 1 (2022)
- Rekere (2023)
- Bab'Motha (2025)

=== Collaborative albums ===
- Scorpion Kings EP (with DJ Maphorisa) (2019)
- Piano Hub EP (with DJ Maphorisa) (2019)
- The Return of the Scorpion Kings (with DJ Maphorisa) (2019)
- Scorpion Kings Live at Sun Arena (with DJ Maphorisa) (2020)
- Once Upon a Time in a Lockdown (with DJ Maphorisa) (2020)
- Petle Petle EP (with DJ Maphorisa & King Deetoy) (2021)
- Rumble in the Jungle (with DJ Maphorisa & TRESOR) (2021)
- Pretty Girls Love Amapiano 3 (with Mdu aka Trp) (2021)
- Scorpion Kings Live Sun Arena (with DJ Maphorisa) (2022)
- Speak N Vrostaan (with Kwesta) (2022)
- The Konka Mixtape: Sweet & Dust (with DJ Maphorisa) (2023)
- Isimo with Mthunzi (2023)
- Da Best (with Leehleza) (2025)
- Love Is A Star (with The Big Hash & Sly)(2026)

=== EPs ===
- Ziwangale (2022)
- Kings Will Rise (with DJ Maphorisa) (2025)

== Singles ==
=== As lead artist ===
List of singles as lead artist, with selected chart positions and certifications, showing year released and album name
Title	Year	Peak chart positions	Certifications	Album
Title	Year	ZA	Certifications	Album
"Heavenly Elements" (V.Soul, Kabza De Small)	2015			Non-album single
"Let It Flow" (Spumante, Kabza De Small)	2018			Non-album single
"Never"	2018			Non-album single
"Bamba la" (featuring Leehleza & Stokie)	2019			Non-album single
"Funu" (Kabza De Small, DJ Maphorisa, Tresor)	2020			Rumble In The Jungle
"Why Ngikufela" (featuring Sha Sha & DJ Maphorisa)	2020			I Am the King of Amapiano: Sweet & Dust
"Lala Ngoxolo (Kabza De Small, Kelvin Momo featuring Mhaw Keys)	2020			Non-album single
"Abalele" (Kabza De Small, DJ Maphorisa featuring Ami Faku)	2021			Non-album single
"Siyabonga" (DJ Zinhle, Black Motion, Kabza De Small, Nokwazi)	2021			Non-album single
"Asibe Happy" (Kabza De Small, DJ Maphorisa featuring Ami Faku)	2021			Non-album single
"Nduma Ndumane" (Mawhoo, Kabza De Small, DJ Maphorisa featuring Da Muziqal Chef)	2023			Non-album single
"Kelaphile" (Mr Brown, Kabza De Small featuring Deeper Phil & Mkeyz)	2023			Manasseh
"Nyuku" (LaTique, Chronical Deep, Kabza De Small)	2023			Non-album single
"Ucingo" (Mashudu, Kabza De Small)	2023			Non-album single
"uNonkosi" (Young Stunna, Kabza De Small featuring Deeper Phil & Mfundo Da DJ)	2023			Non-album single
"Ungiphethe Kahle" (Kabza De Small, DJ Maphorisa featuring Nokwazi, Mawhoo, Mashudu, Lee Art)	2023			Non-album single
"Moshomo" (Mr Brown, Kabza De Small)	2023			Non-album single
"I Have Decided" (Earful Soul, Kabza De Small, Stakev featuring EnoSoul, Artwork Sounds)	2023	—	Gold	Ear II Heart
"Kabza Chant" (featuring Mthunzi, Young Stunna, Nkosazana Daughter, Murumba Pitch, Mashudu, Anzo, Nokwazi, T-Man Xpress)	2024	1		Non-album single
"Bang'bize" (Leehleza, Kabza De Small featuring Young Stunna)	2024			Non-album single
"uKhome Lotto" (Dinho, Tumza D' Kota, Kabza De Small featuring Optimist Music ZA, A'gzo, Seun1401, El.Stephano)	2024	—		Non-album single
"Yebo" (Jnr SA, Darque, Kabza De Small)	2024	—		Non-album single
"Ngifa Nawe" (MFR Souls, Kabza De Small featuring MaWhoo, Bassie, T-Man SA, Shane907)	2024	—		Non-album single
"3 Step to Funk" (Sponge 101, Soul Nativez, Kabza De Small)	2024	—		Non-album single
"Hero To Zero" (Mkeyz, Kabza De Small)	2024	—		Non-album single
"Hayi Baba" (Chronical Deep, Latique, Kabza De Small featuring Leehleza, Ezra)	2024	—		Non-album single
"Akan'hloniphi" (King Deetoy, Kabza De Small, DJ Maphorisa featuring Hulumeni)	2024	—		Non-album single
"You Can Win" (Earful Soul, Poizen, Kabza De Small)	2024	—		Against All Odds
"Wishi Wishi" (Kabza De Small, Vigro Deep, DJ Maphorisa featuring Scotts Maphuma, Young Stunna)	2024	2		Non-album single
"Iza Mawala"	2024	—		Non-album single
"Impi" (Murumba Pitch, Kabza De Small, Mthunzi featuring Phila Dlozi)	2024	—		Impi
"Nkosi" (Darque, Kabza De Small, Dlala Thukzin, Sino Msolo)	2024	—		Non-album single
"Nasempini" (Kabza De Small, Spirit of Praise featuring Ayanda Ntanzi, DJ Maphorisa, Stavek)	2024	—		Non-album single
"Umusa" (Nobuhle, Kabza De Small)	2025	—		Non-album single
"Izintaba" (Nobuhle, Kabza De Small, Young Stunna)	2026	—		Non-album single
"—" denotes a recording that did not chart or was not released in that territory.

=== As featured artist ===
List of singles as featured artist, with selected chart positions and certifications, showing year released and album name
Title	Year	Peak chart positions	Certifications	Album
Title	Year	ZA	Certifications	Album
"Akulaleki" (Samthing Soweto featuring Sha Sha, DJ Maphorisa & Kabza De Small)	2019			Isphithiphithi
"Awesome God" (Artwork Sounds, Bee Bar featuring Kabza De Small)	2023	24	RiSA: Gold	The Gospel According To Artwork Sounds Chapter II
"Uzongenzani" (Nkosazana Daughter featuring Kabza De Small, DJ Maphorisa)	2023	—		Uthingo Le Nkosazana
"Noma Kanjani" (Sino Msolo featuring Kabza De Small, MaWhoo & Azana)	2023	—		Non-album single
"Malume" (Elvirgo, Tallex Q featuring Makhadzi, Kabza De Small & Lxrd Mordecai)	2023	—		Non-album single
"Bayabuza" (Pervader, Young Stunna featuring Kabza De Small, SLY)	2023	—		Non-album single
"Expedition" (Poiżen featuring Kabza De Small, Jus Funo, Seraph im)	2023	—		Lowkey
"High Senses" (Deeper Phil, Chronical Deep, Latique featuring Kabza De Small)	2024	—		Non-album single
"Esgela" (Aymos featuring Eemoh, Kabza De Small)	2024	—		Non-album single
"Vukani" (Pervader featuring Kabza De Small, SLY)	2024	—		Non-album single
"Mbambeni" (Dench, SLY featuring Kabza De Small, TYCOON)	2024	—		Non-album single
"Ngempela" (Mashudu, Shakes & Les featuring Kabza De Small, Murumba Pitch)	2024	—		Non-album single
"—" denotes a recording that did not chart or was not released in that territory.

=== Guest appearances ===
Title	Year	Other artist(s)	Album
"I Wanna Be"	2020	Black Motion	The Healers: The Last Chapter
"Impendulo"	2023	Darque, Berita	More Life
"2 Step"	2024	Shimza, DJ Vitoto	Dreaming
"Mpumelelo"	2025	Dlala Thukzin, Kabza De Small, SYKES, Limit Nala, Thukuthela	031 Studio Camp 2.0
"Muthi"	2025	Dlala Thukzin, Kabza De Small, Mk Productions, Zeh McGeba, Masuda	031 Studio Camp 2.0
"Rider"	2026	Jnr SA, Dlala Thukzin	Dance To My Afro
"911"	2026	Jnr SA, Funky Qla	Dance To My Afro
"Pulse"	2026	Chronical Deep	H.O.P.E

== Other charted and certified songs ==
List of other charted songs, with selected chart positions and certifications, showing year released and album name
Title	Year	Peak chart positions	Certifications	Album
Title	Year	ZA	Certifications	Album
"Imithandazo" (Kabza De Small, Mthunzi featuring Young Stunna, DJ Maphorisa, Sizwe Alakine & Umthakathi Kush)	2023	1		Isimo
"Amazwe" (Kabza De Small featuring MaWhoo & Mthunzi)	2023	7		Isimo
"—" denotes a recording that did not chart or was not released in that territory.
