= DJ Maphorisa =

South African DJ and record producer

DJ Maphorisa Lord Phori
- Also known as: Madumane
- Born: Themba Sekowe; 15 November 1987 (age 38); Soshanguwe, South Africa
- Occupations: DJ; record producer; singer; songwriter
- Years active: 2008–present
- Labels: Blaqboy Music (current); Kalawa Jazmee (former)
- Formerly of: Uhuru

Themba Sekowe (born 15 November 1987), known professionally as DJ Maphorisa, is a South African DJ, record producer, singer, and songwriter. As a record producer with a blend of house music, gqom, amapiano and afropop, he has worked with and has received production credits from several notable artists, including Wizkid, Sizwe Alakine, Kwesta, Uhuru, Drake, Black Coffee, Major Lazer, Runtown, C4 Pedro, TRESOR, Kabza De Small, Focalistic, Era Istrefi, Mpura, Young Stunna and Killer Kau. He was signed to Kalawa Jazmee Records prior to establishing his own record label, BlaqBoy Music.

He rose to stardom after producing several hit singles for artists of multiple music genres, such as Uhuru ("Y-Tjukuta"), Kwesta ("Ngud'"), Busiswa ("Lahla"), DJ Zinhle ("My name Is"), Professor ("Jezebel") and Shekinah ("Suited").

== Personal life ==
Themba "DJ Maphorisa" Sekowe was born on 15 November 1987, and raised in Soshanguve, he is of Tsonga and Lobedu descent, he is the biological brother of South African DJ and record producer Myztro. The word “Maphorisa” means “the police” or “policemen” in Tsonga.

== Career ==
In September 2018, he released a single "Midnight Starring" featuring Moonchild Sanelly, DJ Tira and Busiswa. At the 2018 DStv Mzansi Viewers Choice Awards he received two nominations: Favourite Song Of the Year and Favourite DJ. On November 27, 2018, at the third ceremony of Mzansi Kwaito and House Music Awards his single "Midnight Starring" won an award for most voted-for song.

=== 2019–present: Rumble in the Jungle, Piano Hub and Banyana EP ===
On April 9, 2021, Maphorisa, TRESOR and Kabza De Small released the collaboration studio album Rumble in the Jungle. On April 16, 2021, Anathi and Tyler ICU's studio EP Banyana was released. The EP featured Sir Trill, Daliwonga and Kabza De Small, Mpura, and Visca. The single "Banyana" surpassed 4.2 million streams and was certified double platinum by the Recording industry of South Africa. In 2021, he embarked to Made in Lagos Tour for an opening act with Wizkid. At the 2021 Mzansi Kwaito and House Music Awards he received a nomination for Best DJ.

On 17 September 2021, he released a single "Abalele" with Kabza De Small featuring Ami Faku.

In October 2021, he produced Congolese-born singer TRESOR’s singles, "Makosa" and "Nyota" from the album, Motion.

In November 2022, he worked with Afrika Memani on the Road To Private EP, which was released on the 4th of November.

DJ Maphorisa had received the African DJ of the Year award at the Soundcity MVP Awards which were held at the Eko Convention Centre in Lagos.

In April 2023, he featured on hit single "Mnike" seeing other producers like Tyler ICU, Nandipha808, Ceeka RSA and Tyron Dee collaborating which featured No.1 on many South African Billboards

In May 2023, he decided to collaborate with Kabza De Small on a 25 tracks mixtape project titled: "The Konka Mixtape: Sweet And Dust."

== Controversies ==
=== Assault Allegations by Thuli Phongolo ===
In May 2023, actress and DJ Thuli Phongolo filed assault charges against DJ Maphorisa, alleging he physically attacked her during an altercation. Maphorisa was arrested and later released on bail. Phongolo subsequently withdrew the charges, leading to public debates about domestic violence and the pressures faced by public figures.

=== Dispute with Samthing Soweto ===
In September 2024, DJ Maphorisa was involved in a public dispute with singer Samthing Soweto regarding song credits and royalties. Samthing Soweto accused Maphorisa of misrepresenting his contributions and withholding royalties. In response, Maphorisa alleged that Samthing Soweto had not contributed significantly to the song and was bullying producer Mas Musiq. This controversy sparked broader discussions in the South African music industry about artist collaboration and credit attribution.

== Tours ==
=== Co-headlining ===
- Made in Lagos Tour (2021) (with Wizkid)
- AmaFest (2021)
- Piano People Indoor Winter Festival 2023

== Discography ==
=== Collaborative albums and EPs ===
Year	Title	Collaborators	Notes
2013	Our Father	Uhuru	
2017	Blaqboy Music Presents Gqom Wave	Various artists	
2019	Scorpion Kings EP	Kabza De Small	
2019	The Return of Scorpion Kings	Kabza De Small	
2020	Scorpion Kings Live at Sun Arena	Kabza De Small	Live album
2020	Once Upon a Time in a Lockdown	Kabza De Small	
2020	Madumane EP	—	
2021	Rumble in the Jungle	Kabza De Small, TRESOR	
2021	Banyana EP	Tyler ICU	
2022	Ba Straata	Various artists	
2023	The Konka Mixtape: Sweet & Dust	Kabza De Small	
2025	Ngomoya / Rough Dance	Xduppy	
2025	Kings Will Rise	Kabza De Small	

=== Selected singles ===
==== With Runtown ====
- "The Banger"
- "Omalicha Nwa"

==== With Kwesta ====
- "Ngud'"
- "Mayibabo"
- "Afro Trap"

==== With Mafikizolo ====
- "Khona"
- "Kucheza"
- "Love Potion"

==== With Busiswa ====
- "Bazoyenza"
- "Midnight Starring"

==== With Kabza De Small ====
- "Itemba Lam"
- "Lorch"
- "Hello"
- "Inhliziyo"

==== With Focalistic ====
- "London" (with Madumane)
- "Trust Fund" (with Mpura)

==== Other notable collaborations ====
- "Soweto Baby" (featuring Wizkid and DJ Bucks)
- "Banyana" (with Sir Trill and Kabza De Small)
- "Ba Straata" (featuring 2woshort)

=== Singles produced ===
List of singles as either producer or co-producer, with selected chart positions and certifications, showing year released and album name
Title	Year	Peak chart positions								Certifications	Album
Title	Year	CAN	AUS	IRL	NZ	SA	UK	US	US R&B /HH	Certifications	Album
"Ngud'" (Kwesta)	2016	—	—	—	—	1	—	—	—	RiSA: 5× Platinum	DaKAR II
"One Dance" (Drake featuring Wizkid and Kyla)	2016	1	1	1	1	1	1	1	1	ARIA: Gold; BPI: Platinum; RMNZ: Platinum	Views
"Suited" (Shekhinah)	2017	—	—	—	—	1	—	—	—	RiSA: Diamond	Rose Gold
"Midnight Starring" (featuring DJ Tira, Busiswa & Moonchild Sanelly)	2017	—	—	—	—	—	—	—	—		Non-album single
"—" denotes a recording that did not chart or was not released in that territory.

== Awards and nominations ==
=== African Muzik Magazine Awards ===
Year	Nominee / work	Award	Result	Ref.
2020	Himself	Music Producer of the	Nominated	

=== All Africa Music Awards ===
Year	Nominee / work	Award	Result	Ref.
2025	"Dlala ka Yona"	Artiste of the Year	Pending	
2025	"Dlala ka Yona"	Best African DJ	Pending	
2025	"Abantwana Bakho"	Producer of the Year	Pending	
2025	"Abantwana Bakho"	Song of the Year	Pending	
2025	"Ngomoya"	Album of the Year	Pending	

=== Dance Music Awards South Africa ===
Year	Nominee / work	Award	Result	Ref.
2019	"Amantombazane"	Best Amapiano Record	Won	

=== Dstv Mzansi Viewers Choice Awards ===
Year	Nominee / work	Award	Result
2018	"Midnight Starring"	Favourite Song Of the Year	Nominated
2018	Himself	Favourite DJ	Nominated
2022	Scorpion Kings	Favourite DJ	Nominated

=== Humanitarian African Prestigious Awards ===
Year	Nominee / work	Award	Result
	Himself	Music Producer of The Year	Nominated
	Himself	Best DJ Africa	Nominated

=== MTV Africa Music Awards ===
Year	Nominee / work	Award	Result
2016	Himself	Song of the Year	Nominated
2020		Best African Act	Nominated

=== Metro FM Music Awards ===
Year	Nominee / work	Award	Result	Ref.
2024	"Imithandazo"	Song of the Year	Won	
2024	"Imithandazo"	Best Collaboration	Won	
2024	"Imithandazo"	Best Amapiano	Won	
2025	"Biri Marung"	Best Amapiano Song	Pending	
2025	"Yebo Lapho (Gogo)"	Best Amapiano Song	Pending	
2025	"Yebo Lapho (Gogo)"	Song of the Year	Pending	
2025	"Biri Marung"	Song of the Year	Pending	
2026	Himself	Best Male Artist	Pending	
2026	Himself	Artist of the Year	Pending	
2026	"Abantwana Bakho"	Song of the Year	Pending	
2026	"Abantwana Bakho"	Best Amapiano	Pending	
2026	"Dlala Ka Yona"	Best Amapiano	Pending	

=== Mzansi Kwaito and House Music Awards ===
Year	Nominee / work	Award	Result
2018	"Midnight Starring"	Most Voted Song	Won
2021	Himself	Best producer	Pending
2021	Himself	Best AmaPiano songs	Pending
2021	Himself	Best AmaPiano songs	Pending

=== SA Amapiano Music Awards ===
Year	Nominee / work	Award	Result
2021	Himself	Best amapiano male DJ/Act	Nominated

=== Soundcity MVP Awards ===
Year	Nominee / work	Award	Result	Ref.
2023	Himself	African DJ of the Year	Won	
