= Amapiano =

Subgenre of house music

- Stylistic origins: Kwaito; gqom; deep house; jazz; soul; lounge
- Cultural origins: Mid 2010s (disputed in Gauteng)
- Typical instruments: Piano; drums; synthesiser

Subgenres
- S'gija; Private School Piano; Quantum Sound; Bique

Fusion genres
- Afropiano; Bongopiano; New Age Bacardi; Ojapiano; Popiano

Local scenes
- Pretoria, Soweto, Alexandra, Katlehong, Vosloorus

Other topics
- Afro fusion; Shangaan electro

Amapiano is a genre of music from South Africa that became popular in the early 2020s. It is a hybrid of kwaito, deep house, gqom, jazz, soul, and lounge music characterised by synths and wide, percussive basslines. The word "amapiano" derives from the IsiZulu word for "pianos".

== Origins ==
There is no single "true founder" of amapiano.

As a result, there is ambiguity and debate concerning its origin, with various accounts of the musical styles in the Johannesburg townships. Because it has some similarities with bacardi house, some people assert the genre began in Pretoria but it remains uncertain. Various accounts of who formed the popular genre make it impossible to accurately pinpoint its origin.

The word amapiano is a Zulu word that can be loosely translated to "pianos." The genre is mostly sung in eleven of South Africa's 12 official languages such as IsiZulu, IsiXhosa, SiSwati, Sesotho, Sepedi, Setswana, English, Xitsonga, Tshivenda, Afrikaans, or IsiNdebele.

== Description ==
Amapiano is distinguished by piano melodies, deep house, soul, kwaito and log drum basslines. The genre's sample packs often incorporate sounds sourced from gqom music. Bacardi, is often misperceived either as a subgenre of amapiano or having emerged in the 2020s.

A popular element of the genre is the use of the log drum (an electronic version of the West African originating log drum), a wide percussive bassline, which was popularised in amapiano music by several producers. According to amapiano pioneer Kabza De Small:

"I don't know what happened. I don't know how he figured out the log drum. Amapiano music has always been there, but he's the one who came up with the log drum sound. These boys like experimenting. They always check out new plug-ins. So when MDU figured it out, he ran with it."

The use of an electronic or the log drum sound in African music predates amapiano although the contrary is often misperceived, and was possibly developed from the traditional or acoustic West African log drum by kwaito pioneer M'du (also known as Mdu Masilela).

== Subgenres and fusion ==
=== Afropiano ===
Afropiano also referred to as Nigerian amapiano, a blend of afrobeats and amapiano, gained prominence in the early 2020s as a popular variant of afrobeats. Pioneers of the genre include Clemzy and L.A.X.

=== Bique ===
Bique employs a prominently undulated log drum sound and derives its name from the Southeastern African country, Mozambique. Notable illustrations of bique are "Ize (Bique Mix)" by ZanTen and DJ SOL K, FOI and Jay Music's "Bique (Deep Groove)", songs.

=== Bongopiano ===
Bongopiano is a fusion genre that blends bongo flava music and amapiano, emerging in Tanzania during the 2020s. In the 2020s, numerous prominent Tanzanian musical artists including Diamond Platnumz, Marioo, Harmonize, Nandy, Jux, Mbosso and Zuchu released notable bongopiano songs.

=== Gqom 2.0 ===
In the mid-2010s circa early 2020s, Gqom 2.0 emerged as a subgenre of gqom, alongside other gqom variants for instance 3-Step and sgubhu. Gqom 2.0 is distinguished by a slowed-down tempo fused with elements of amapiano, afrohouse and afrotech.

=== New Age Bacardi ===
New Age Bacardi denotes the fusion of bacardi with amapiano that emerged circa mid-2021 illustrated by the Mellow & Sleazy track "Trust Fund" which featured Kabza De Small, Mpura, Focalistic and DJ Maphorisa. DJ Maphorisa highlighted that Pretoria-based record producers played a key role in merging the musical styles and that the pace of new age bacardi had been slowed-down from the original fast-paced bacardi tempos.

=== Ojapiano ===
Ojapiano is a fusion of the traditional Igbo instrument Ọjà and subgenre of amapiano which emerged in Nigeria in the early 2020s. The term was coined by Kcee in the 2020s. There have been several pioneers of the genre since its emergence including Kcee, Snazzy the Optimist, Oxlade and renowned American pop rock band OneRepublic.

=== Popiano ===
Popiano blends pop with amapiano. A notable illustration is the 2021 single "Overdue" by record producers Kooldrink, DJ Lag and singer, Tyla which showcased a fusion of popiano and gqom. Since popiano's inception Tyla has been deemed "The Queen of Popiano".

=== Private school piano ===
Private school piano also known as soulful amapiano is distinguished by its use of shakers, mellow log drum sounds and progressive chord sequences. Private school piano is primarily credited to Kelvin Momo. The genre frequently incorporates live instrumentation, including the guitar, saxophone, violin and trumpet.

=== Quantum Sound ===
Quantum sound is a genre characterised by re-edits, fundamentally rooted in and influenced by gqom, particularly the taxi kick style. The genre is attributed to several record producers including RealShaunMusiq, Sizwe Nineteen and Nandipha808.

== Popularity ==
In 2019, the genre experienced increased popularity across the African continent, with noted increases in digital streams and chart successes in countries far from its South African origin.

In 2021, an awards ceremony was created that was dedicated to the genre, the South Africa Amapiano Music Awards.

In 2022, the American online music store Beatport added the genre to its platform with its own dedicated charts and playlists.

The genre was popular amongst young people on social media platforms, where videos using amapiano music were uploaded, which fuelled the dancing scene in South Africa.

In October 2023, the afrobeats and amapiano fusion song "Water" by Tyla gained international prominence following a viral bacardi house dance challenge on social media. It became the first song by a South African soloist to enter the U.S. Billboard Hot 100 in 55 years, and was a top 10 hit in the United Kingdom, Ireland, Australia, the Netherlands, Sweden and New Zealand, where it reached number one.

== International artists ==
South Korean girl group Le Sserafim took inspiration from amapiano for their track "Smart" off of their third EP, Easy. Chinese rapper Vinida Weng blended amapiano with Fujianese rap for her track "Waiya!". Egyptian artist TUL8TE made an amapiano inspired track entitled "Enty Crazy" in his album Narein.

== See also ==
- List of Amapiano musicians
