= Mamello Makha =

Mamello Makha is a South African socialite, celebrity stylist, fashionista, television and cosmetics entrepreneur. She is also one of South Africa's well known sports enthusiast popular for supporting Bloemfontein Celtic F.C.. She was awarded Sports Fan of the Year in 2018 and 2019

== Background ==
Mamello Makha was born in Bloemfontein, Free State where she grew up. She attained a Sports Management & Project Management degree from the University of Johannesburg.

In 2006, Mamello had a stint football career at Bloemfontein Celtics FC where she played for the team's ladies. in 2007 she was then promoted to kit manager, and eventually became a physiotherapist for the club. Bloemfontein Celtics FC then awarded her a bursary to study sport management. She was seen on the small screen at almost every game Celtic played for which she became named and known as the female BOTA of the Celtic Club.

Mamello established Mamello Makha Exotic Beauty Salon in 2015 and Mamello Makha Boutique in 2017 through which she has established her prominence as a celebrity stylist in South Africa having styled public figures that include Carol Tshabalala, Nomsa Buthelezi, Malihlohonolo, Winnie Khumalo, Makhadzi, Rethabile Khumalo and Zonke Mcunu.

In 2020, Mamello starred in the reality tv show called A Cut Above The Rest on SABC 3. The show was the first hair reality series competition and it showcased the best hairstylists in South Africa. In 2021 Mamello was awarded as the South Africa Darling Hair Ambassador.

Mamello Makha was nominated for the Gauteng Sport Awards in the category of Sport Fan of the Year in 2015- 2019 and she won the award in 2018 and 2019. She was also nominated for the Style Star of the Year award at the 2022 Momentum Gsport Awards.
