= Rethabile Khumalo =

South African singer-songwriter

- Born: Rethabile Roberta Khumalo; 9 September 1995 (age 30); Protea Glen, Soweto, South Africa
- Occupation: Singer-songwriter
- Years active: 2012–present
- Mother: Winnie Khumalo
- Awards: Mzansi Kwaito and House Music Award for Most Voted Song (2021)
- Musical career
- Genres: House; amapiano
- Instruments: Vocals
- Labels: Afrotainment; Winnkay Music

Rethabile Roberta Khumalo (born 9 September 1995) is a South African singer-songwriter mononymously known as Rethabile. She rose to fame after being featured on a single "Umlilo" by DJ Zinhle, which was certified triple platinum by Recording Industry of South Africa. She was declared a platinum selling musician after her single "Ntyilo Ntyilo" was certified platinum in August 2021.

== Life and career ==
=== Early life ===
Rethabile Khumalo was born on 9 September 1995. Her mother, Winnie Khumalo, was a South African singer.

=== Career ===
In 2012, Rethabile auditioned on Idols South Africa at the age of 16 and got eliminated. In 2018, she signed a record deal with Afrotaiment, and released her single "Nomathemba" in September 2018. In August 2019, she was featured on DJ Zinhle single "Umlilo" in collaboration with or rather produced by Mvzzle, after successful collaboration with Zinhle, she released her single "Ntyilo Ntyilo" featuring South African DJ Master KG. The song was certified platinum by the Recording Industry of South Africa. "Ntyilo Ntyilo" won Most Voted Song at 6th Mzansi Kwaito and House Music Awards.

In September 2020, her debut studio album Like Mother, Like Daughter was released.

== Discography ==
- Like Mother Like Daughter (2020)
- The Legacy EP (2022)

== Filmography ==
=== Television ===
Year	Title	Role	Notes	Results	Ref.
2012	Idols SA	Herself	Contestant	Eliminated	

== Awards and nominations ==
Year	Award Ceremony	Prize	Recipient/Nominated work	Result	Ref.
2020	26th South African Music Awards	Record of the Year (fan-voted)	Umlilo	Nominated	
2021	27th South African Music Awards	Best Music Video of the Year	Umlilo	Nominated	
2021	6th Mzansi Kwaito and House Music Awards	Most Voted Song	Ntyilo Ntyilo	Won	
