= Mvzzle =

South African record producer

- Born: Gift Selaelo Morukhuladi; 11 November 1994 (age 31); Musina, South Africa
- Other names: Mvzzle Beatz; Silencer; Mvzzle with the V
- Education: Westenburg Secondary School (matriculated)
- Occupations: DJ; Record producer; Singer-songwriter
- Years active: ?.–present
- Known for: Producing Umlilo
- Musical career
- Origin: Westenburg, Polokwane, South Africa
- Genres: House; Hip Hop; Afro tech; Amapiano; Trap
- Instruments: Vocals; DAW; Sampler
- Label: Warner Music South Africa (formerly)
- Website: mvzzle.co.za

Gift Selaelo Morukhuladi (born 11 November 1994), professionally known as Mvzzle (/ˈmʌˈzl/) is a South African DJ, singer-songwriter, and producer born in Musina and raised in Westenburg, Polokwane. He is famous for producing the single "Umlilo" by DJ Zinhle.

== Personal life ==
Born Gift S. Morukhuladi, in Musina and raised in a village called Mountain View. His mother is a businesswoman and his father was the Conductor of the military band. At age 8, he moved to Polokwane International Gateway to be with his parents. At this point, his dad had gone from Conductor to Band Master at the SA Army Band.

== Early life ==
=== 2014–2015 ===
Before producing House music, Mvzzle was a full time Hip Hop producer and rapper in high school. He was with a musical trio called Cyclops alongside his teammates Septic Rooger (Kagiso Mokwena) and Gran-T (Thabiso Ledwaba), which Mvzzle produced his first singles and mixtape with. After the trio disbanded, Mvzzle started his solo career producing both house and rap music, releasing singles titled Carpe Diem and Thick Madam, which he entered the SABC1's 1s and 2s competition with.

=== 2016 ===
Initially producing Hip-Hop and R&B, he started producing house music in 2016. He dropped out of college to pursue music and the assistance of South African Arts and Culture Youth Forum who gave him opportunities to play at events such as Major League Gardens, Mapungubwe Arts Festival, and Motsepe Foundation.

=== 2018 ===
He entered SABC 1's Dj competition, 1's and 2's – where he placed third. After the competition, MVZZLE contacted DJ Zinhle with two beats, one of which is now the song "Umlilo" featuring Rethabile – who had earlier been in contact with DJ Zinhle on Instagram proposing a collaboration with her.

== Career ==
DJ Zinhle's Umlilo has been certified multi-platinum and within its first three months, it reached over 5.1 million streams.

In celebration of the song's success, DJ Zinhle released a second video for Umlilo in December.

The hit single went on to receive triple-platinum plaques, and multiple SAMAs nominations. The single won a NAMA award. The female producer DJ Zinhle was accused of buying nominations for the song.

== Discography ==
=== Singles and EPs ===
Title	Type	Release details	Certification
Uvalo	Single	Release date: 2020; Label: Warner Music South Africa; Formats: Digital download	TBA
Sonke	EP	Release date: 2021; Label: Warner Music South Africa; Formats: Digital download	TBA
"Sdudla or Slender" (Shandesh& Mvzzle)	Single	Release date: 12 March 2025 Label: Shandesh Music Formats: Digital download, streaming	RiSA: Platinum
"Di Chopper" (Shandesh& Mvzzle featuring Abi Wa Mampela & Naleboy Young King)	Single	Released: 11 April 2025 Label: Shandesh Music Formats: Digital download, streaming	

== Filmography ==
=== Television ===
Year	Title	Role	Notes	Results	Ref.
2018	1's and 2's	Himself	Contestant	Runner-up	

== Awards and nominations ==
Year	Award Ceremony	Prize	Recipient/Nominated work	Result	Ref.
2020	South African Music Awards	Record of the Year (fan-voted)	"Umlilo"	Nominated	
2021	South African Music Awards	Best Music Video of the Year	"Umlilo"	Nominated	
