= Killings of Maria Makgato and Kudzai Ndlovu =

2024 murders in South Africa

- Location: Sebayeng, South Africa
- Date: August 17, 2024
- Attack type: Shooting
- Deaths: 2
- Injuries: 1
- Victims: Maria Makgato; Kudzai Ndlovu
- Accused: 3
- Charges: Murder

On August 20, 2024, 45-year-old Maria Makgato and 34-year-old Kudzai Ndlovu were shot and killed in the Limpopo province of South Africa. The women had been on a farm in Sebayeng, outside Mankweng, scavenging for food that might have been given to pigs. One of the women's husbands was also shot, but survived and alerted authorities. The remains of the women were found in a pigsty by authorities.

== Incident ==
Maria Makgato, Lucia Ndlovu, and Ndlovu's husband illegally entered the property of a farm in Sebayeng in search of expired dairy products, which they thought may have been left out for the pigs. The three were shot at; Ndlovu's husband was able to run away and alert authorities, while the two women died.

== Investigation ==
Three men (the farm owner and two employees) were arrested on murder charges on August 20, 2024, when authorities discovered the remains of Makgato and Ndlovu on the farm's property.

== Legal proceedings ==
They appeared in court on November 6, 2024. One of the men appeared again on November 22, 2024 for a bail application.

One of the arrested men, a farmworker named Adrian de Wet, testified on August 4, 2025 that the farmowner killed the two women and threw their bodies into the pig enclosure. On August 7, 2025, prosecutors withdrew charges against de Wet.

The trial is set to run from October 6 to October 17.

== Responses ==
The incident caused political disruptions in the country. The Economic Freedom Fighters, a left-wing party in the country, made calls for the farm's operations to be suspended, and for its products to be pulled from the market. They said in 2024: "Our communities can’t be fed animals that were made to consume human flesh." Additionally, the incident aggravated racial turmoil within the country due to the fact that two of the farmers were white and both of the deceased were black.
