= Southern Ndebele language =

Language belonging to the Nguni group

Southern Ndebele
- isiNdebele sakwaNdzundza noManala
- isiNdebele seSewula
- Native to: South Africa
- Region: Mpumalanga, Limpopo, Gauteng, North West
- Ethnicity: amaNdebele
- Native speakers: 1.1 million (2011 census); 1.4 million L2 speakers (2002)
- Language family: Niger–Congo?: Atlantic–Congo; Volta-Congo; Benue–Congo; Bantoid; Southern Bantoid; Bantu; Southern Bantu; Nguni; Zunda; Southern Ndebele
- Writing system: Latin (Ndebele alphabet); Ndebele Braille
- Signed forms: Signed Ndebele

Official status
- Official language in: South Africa

Language codes
- ISO 639-1: nr – South Ndebele
- ISO 639-2: nbl – South Ndebele
- ISO 639-3: nbl – South Ndebele
- Glottolog: sout2808
- Guthrie code: S.407
- Linguasphere: 99-AUT-fi

Ndebele
- Person: iNdebele
- People: AmaNdebele
- Language: IsiNdebele
- Country: KwaNdebele

Geographical distribution of Southern Ndebele in South Africa: proportion of the population that speaks Southern Ndebele at home.: 0–20%; 20–40%; 40–60%; 60–80%; 80–100%

Geographical distribution of Southern Ndebele in South Africa: density of Southern Ndebele home-language speakers.: <1 /km²; 1–3 /km²; 3–10 /km²; 10–30 /km²; 30–100 /km²; 100–300 /km²; 300–1000 /km²; 1000–3000 /km²; >3000 /km²

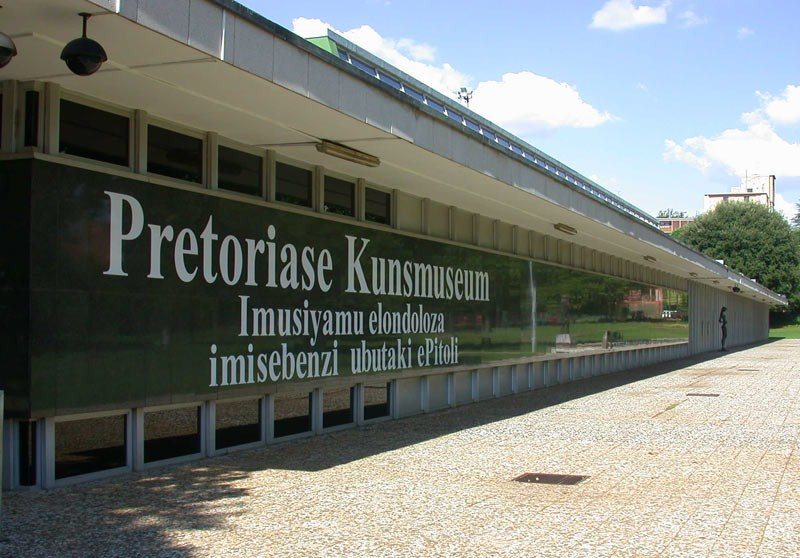
Bilingual sign in Afrikaans and Southern Ndebele at the Pretoria Art Museum

Southern Ndebele (English: /ɛndəˈbiːliː/), also known by its native name isiNdebele, is an African language belonging to the Nguni group of Bantu languages, spoken by the Ndebele people of South Africa. It is not to be confused with Northern Ndebele (also called Zimbabwean Ndebele or isiNdebele) nor with Northern Transval Ndebele (also called Sumayela Ndebele or Sindebele) spoken in Limpopo in areas such as Polokwane (Bhulungwane), Ga-Rathoka (KaSondonga), Ga-Mashashane, Ga Maraba / Kalkspruit, Mokopane (Mghumbane), Zebediela (Sebetiela), which is closer to Southern Ndebele.

== Overview ==
The Ndebele (Southern and Northern) people's history has been traced back to King Ndebele, King Ndebele fathered King Mkhalangana, King Mkhalangana fathered King Mntungwa (not to be confused with the Khumalo Mntungwa, because he was fathered by Mbulazi), King Mntungwa fathered King Jonono, King Jonono fathered King Nanasi, King Nanasi fathered King Mafana, king Mafana fathered King Mhlanga and Chief Libhoko, King Mhlanga fathered King Musi and Chief Skhube.

Ndebele – Some of his sons were left behind with the Hlubi tribe
Mkhalangana – Some of his sons branched north and formed the Kalanga tribe
Mntungwa – Founder of the amaNtungwa clan
Njonono – He died in Jononoskop near Ladysmith – Surname Jonono is in the Hlubi tribe
Nanasi – He died in Jononoskop near Ladysmith – Surname Nanasi is in the Hlubi tribe
Mafana – He died in Randfontein (Emhlangeni)
Mhlanga – He died in Randfontein (Emhlangeni)
Musi – He died in kwaMnyamana (Pretoria)

King Musi's kraal was based at eMhlangeni a place named after his father Mhlanga, the name of the place is currently known as Randfontein (Mohlakeng) and later moved to KwaMnyamana which is now called Emarula or Bon Accord in Pretoria. King Musi was a polygamist and fathered the following sons, Skhosana (Masombuka), Manala (Mbuduma), Ndzundza (Hlungwana), Thombeni (Kekana or Gegana), Sibasa, Mhwaduba (Lekhuleni) and Mphafuli and others.

Southern Ndebele is one of the twelve official languages in the Republic of South Africa. The language is a Nguni or Zunda classification (UN) spoken mostly in the Mpumalanga Province, Gauteng, Limpopo and the Northwest.

The expression isikhethu can be loosely translated to mean 'the Southern Ndebele way of doing or saying'. Isikhethu means Southern Ndebele in the same way that sikitsi will mean Swazi and se harona will mean Sotho.

The language has been severely marginalised over the years. Until the formation of the apartheid Southern Ndebele homeland (KwaNdebele), speaking the language publicly was discouraged. Most Southern Ndebele speakers preferred Zulu especially because the latter was learned at school. Today the Southern Ndebele speakers, mostly those who are educated still prefer to use Southern Ndebele as home language for their children and will use Southern Ndebele as a language to communicate with other Southern Ndebele speakers.

== Phonology ==
=== Vowels ===
Southern Ndebele vowels
	Front	Back
Close	i [i]	u [u]
Mid	e [e~ɛ]	o [o~ɔ]
Open	a [a]	

=== Consonants ===
Southern Ndebele consonants
		Labial	Alveolar		Post-alv./ Palatal	Velar	Glottal
		Labial	central	lateral	Post-alv./ Palatal	Velar	Glottal
Plosive	ejective	p [pʼ]	t [tʼ]			k [kʼ]	
Plosive	aspirated	ph [pʰ]	th [tʰ]			kh [kʰ]	
Plosive	devoiced	bh [b̥]	d [d̥]			ɡ [ɡ̊]	
Plosive	prenasal	mp [ᵐp]	nt [ⁿt]			nk [ᵑk]	
Plosive	prenasal (vd.)	mb [ᵐb]	nd [ⁿd]			ng [ᵑɡ]	
Plosive	implosive	b [ɓ]					
Affricate	ejective		ts [tsʼ]	tl [tɬʼ]	tj [tʃʼ]	kg [kxʼ]	
Affricate	aspirated		tsh [tsʰ]	tlh [tɬʰ]	tjh [tʃʰ]	kgh [kxʰ]	
Affricate	plain		dz [dz]				
Affricate	devoiced				j [d̥ʒ]		
Affricate	prenasal				nj [ᶮdʒ]		
Fricative	plain	f [f]	s [s]	hl [ɬ]		rh [x]	
Fricative	voiced	v [v]	z [z]	dl [ɮ]			h [ɦ]
Fricative	prenasal	mf [ᶬf]					
Fricative	prenasal (vd.)	mv [ᶬv]					
Fricative	aspirated			dlh [ɮʰ]			
Nasal		m [m]	n [n]		ny [ɲ]	ngh [ŋ]	
Liquid			r [r]	l [l]			
Semivowel		w [w]			y [j]		

Consonant sounds nt, nd, k, mf, and mv often result in allophones of [d̥r dr k̬ ɱp̪fʼ ɱb̪v].

=== Click consonants ===
Southern Ndebele clicks
		Dental	Post- alveolar	Lateral
voiceless	plain	c [ᵏǀ]	q [ᵏ!]	x [ᵏǁ]
voiceless	aspirated	ch [ᵏǀʰ]	qh [ᵏ!ʰ]	
voiced	plain	gc [ᶢǀ]	gq [ᶢ!]	
voiced	nasalized	nc [ᵑǀ]	nq [ᵑ!]	nx [ᵑǁ]

== Grammar ==
=== Nouns ===
The Southern Ndebele noun consists of two essential parts, the prefix and the stem. Using the prefixes, nouns can be grouped into noun classes, which are numbered consecutively, to ease comparison with other Bantu languages.

The following table gives an overview of Southern Ndebele noun classes, arranged according to singular-plural pairs.

Class	Singular	Plural
1/2	um(u)-^{1}	aba-, abe-
1a/2a	u-	abo-
3/4	um(u)-^{1}	imi-
5/6	i-, ili-, ilu-	ama-
7/8	is(i)-	iz(i)-, iiN-
9/10	iN-	iiN-
14	ubu-, ub-, utj-	
15	uku-	
17	uku-	

^{1} umu- replaces um- before monosyllabic stems, e. g. umuntu (person).

=== Verbs ===
Verbs use the following affixes for the subject and the object:

Person/ Class	Prefix	Infix
1st sing.	ngi-	-ngi-
2nd sing.	u-	-wu-
1st plur.	si-	-si-
2nd plur.	ni-	-ni-
1	u-	-m(u)-
2	ba-	-ba-
3	u-	-m(u)-
4	i-	-yi-
5	li-	-li-
6	a-	-wa-
7	si-	-si-
8	zi-	-zi-
9	i-	-yi-
10	zi-	-zi-
14	bu-	-bu-
15	ku-	-ku-
17	ku-	-ku-
reflexive		-zi-

== Examples ==
Months in Southern Ndebele

English	Northern Ndebele (Zimbabwe)	Southern Ndebele (South Africa)	Zulu (South Africa)
January	uZibandlela	uTjhirhweni	uMasingane
February	uNhlolanja	uMhlolanja	uNhlolanja
March	uMbimbitho	uNtaka	uNdasa
April	uMabasa	uSihlabantangana	UMbasa
May	uNkwekwezi	uMrhayili	UNhlaba
June	uNhlangula	uMgwengweni	UNhlangulana
July	uNtulikazi	uVelabahlinze	uNtulikazi
August	uNcwabakazi	uRhoboyi	UNcwaba
September	uMpandula	uKhukhulamungu	uMandulo
October	uMfumfu	uSewula	uMfumfu
November	uLwezi	uSinyikhaba	uLwezi
December	uMpalakazi	uNobayeni	uZibandlela

=== Days of the week ===
English	Southern Ndebele
Monday	Umvulo
Tuesday	Ulwesibili
Wednesday	Ulwesithathu
Thursday	Ulwesine
Friday	Ulwesihlanu
Saturday	uMgqibelo
Sunday	iNsondo

=== Numbers in Southern Ndebele ===
English	Southern Ndebele
One	Kunye
Two	Kubili
Three	Kuthathu
Four	Kune
Five	Kuhlanu
Six	Isithandathu
Seven	Isikhomba
Eight	Ubunani
Nine	Ithiba
Ten	Itjhumi
Fifty	Amatjhumi amahlanu
One hundred	Ikhulu
One thousand	Ikulungwane

== AmaNdebele in Zimbabwe ==
Zimbabwean Ndebele is part of the Nguni cluster and is therefore very similar to other Nguni languages (such as Zulu, Xhosa and Swati) with which it shares a high level of mutual intelligibility. Southern Ndebele, while maintaining its Nguni roots, has been influenced by the Sotho languages.
