= Protea Glen Mall =

- Location: Protea Glen, Soweto, Gauteng, South Africa
- Coordinates: 26.2752°S 27.8116°E
- Opened: September 27, 2012
- Developer: 48 developers
- Owner: Masingita Group
- Num. of stores: 96
- Num. of anchor tenants: 2
- Floor area: 30,000 m^{2} (320,000 sq ft)
- Floors: 1
- Parking: 1055
- Website: proteaglenmall.co.za

The Protea Glen Mall is a shopping mall in Protea Glen, in Soweto, Gauteng, South Africa, which opened in September 2012.

Built at a cost of approximately R360-380 million, the mall is located at the intersection of R558 and Protea Boulevard in the centre of Protea Glen, and has over 90 tenants.

== Background ==
Mike Nkuna, chairman of developer Masingita Group, first conceived of placing a mall in Protea Glen in 2005, as residents had been traveling to Lenasia for their shopping. It is the first mall located in the Johannesburg suburb, which has only been developed since the 1990s. It has been the sixth mall to open in Soweto. Locally, it is considered notable for having both rival supermarket retailers Pick n Pay and Shoprite among its tenants.
