= Sebayeng =

Solomondale Sebayeng
- Location within Limpopo Location within South Africa
- Coordinates: 23.885°S 29.718°E
- Country: South Africa
- Province: Limpopo
- District: Capricorn
- Municipality: Polokwane

Area
  - Total: 6.92 km^{2} (2.67 sq mi)
- Elevation: 1,086 m (3,563 ft)

Population (2011)
  - Total: 13,826
  - Density: 2,000/km^{2} (5,170/sq mi)

Racial makeup (2011)
  - Black African: 99.6%
  - Indian/Asian: 0.1%
  - Other: 0.2%

First languages (2011)
  - Northern Sotho: 92.6%
  - Tsonga: 3.0%
  - Other: 4.4%
- Time zone: UTC+2 (SAST)
- Postal code (street): 0964
- PO box: 0752
- Area code: +27 (0)15

Sebayeng, also known as Solomondale, is a township in the Polokwane Local Municipality (ward 32) of the Capricorn District Municipality of the Limpopo province of South Africa. It is located about 37 km east of the city of Polokwane on the R81 road.

== Education ==
- Sebayeng Primary School
- Solomondale Primary School
- Maphoto Primary School
- Masebodila Primary School
- Mafolofolo High School
- Leruleng Secondary School
- Baphutheng Secondary School

== Notable people ==
- Shandesh, singer
- Kharishma, singer
- Escape town, Dancer
- Mokgalapa T, Student Activist
- Tshukudu Manaka, Actor
