= Bendor Park =

Suburb in Polokwane

Bendor
- City
- Bendor Park
- Location within Limpopo Location within South Africa Location within Africa Location within Earth
- Coordinates: 23.886371°S 29.486517°E
- Country: South Africa
- Province: Limpopo
- District: Capricorn
- Municipality: Polokwane Municipality
- Main Place: Polokwane

Government
  - Executive Mayor: Thembi Nkadimeng (ANC)
  - Mayor: John Mpe

Area
  - Total: 8.87 km^{2} (3.42 sq mi)

Population (2011)
  - Total: 15,298
  - Density: 1,720/km^{2} (4,470/sq mi)
- Demonym: Snob

Racial makeup (2011)
  - Black African: 53.91%
  - White: 41.72%
  - Indian/Asian: 2.41%
  - Coloured: 1.73%
  - Other: 0.23%

First languages (2011)
  - Afrikaans: 37.78%
  - Sepedi: 25.57%
  - English: 13.52%
  - Venda: 7.31%
  - Other: 2.22%
- Time zone: UTC+2 (SAST)
- Postal code (street): 0699
- PO box: 0700
- Area code: 015
- Bird: Northern royal albatross
- Flower: Blue squill
- Website: Official website

Bendor Park (or simply Bendor), is a suburb in Polokwane under the Capricorn District Municipality in the Limpopo province of South Africa.

== Shopping malls ==
- Mall of the North
