= Polokwane =

City in Limpopo, South Africa

Polokwane Pietersburg (Afrikaans)
- City
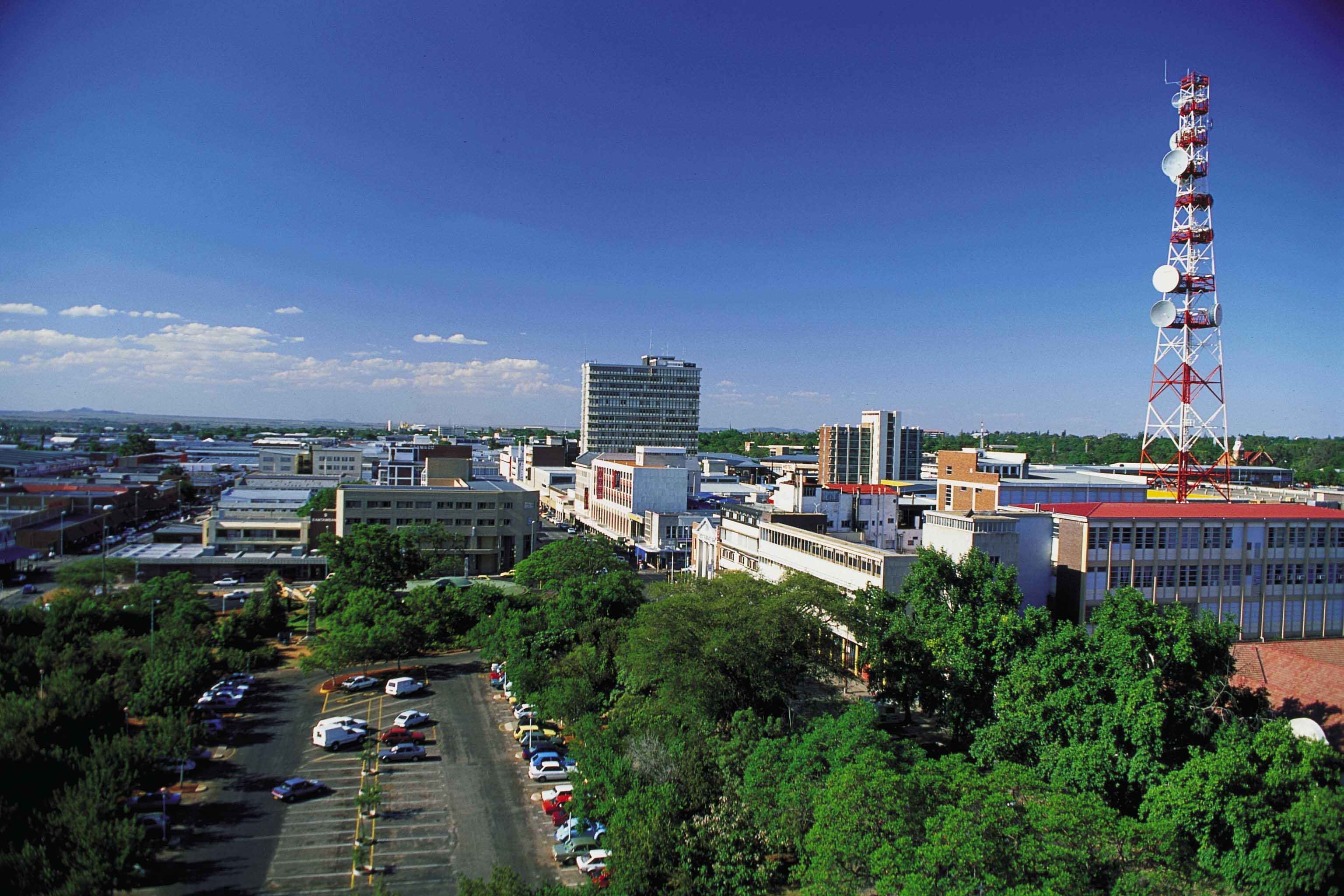
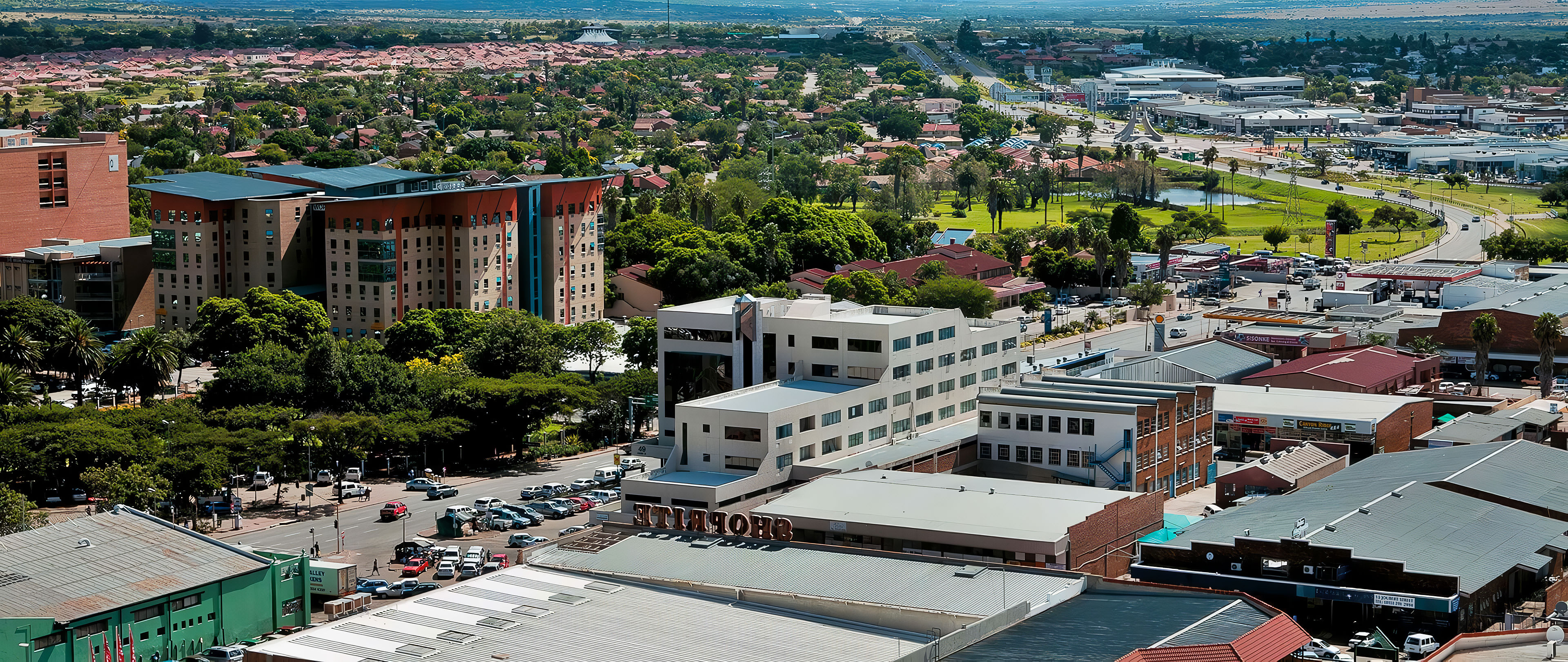
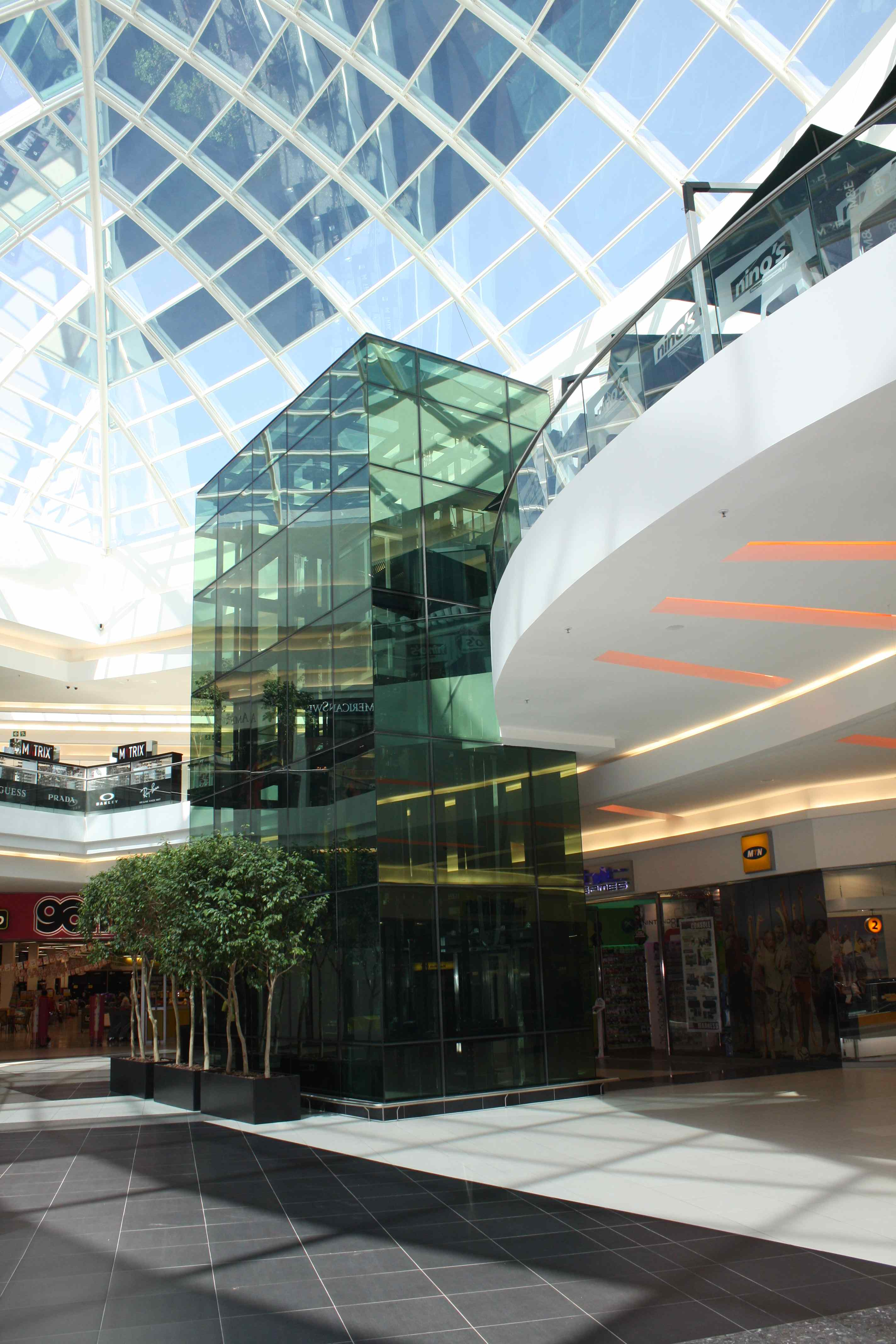
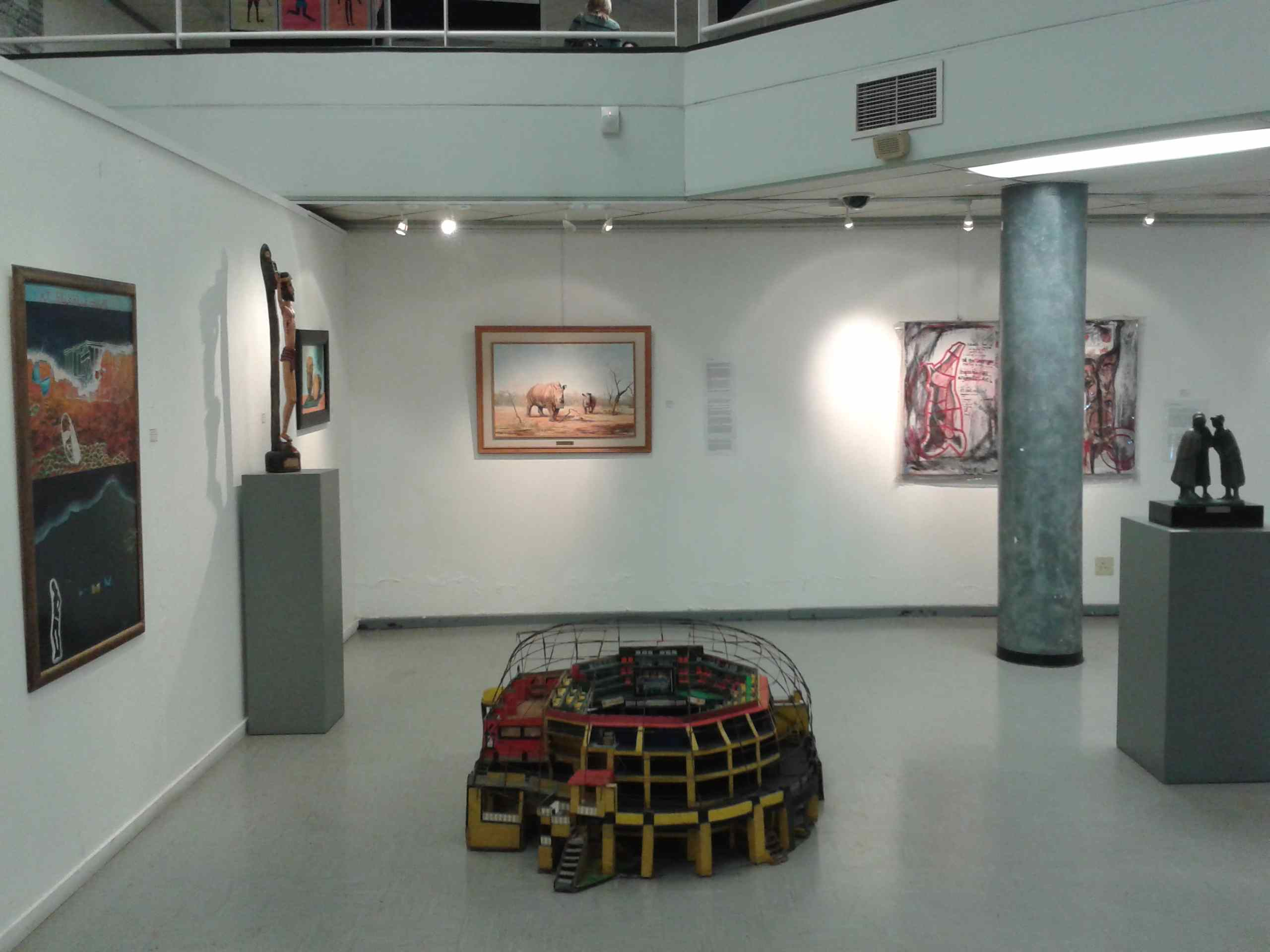
- City Centre Part of the CBD Mall of the North Polokwane Art Museum

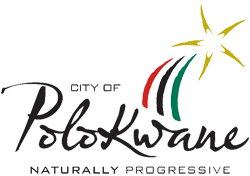
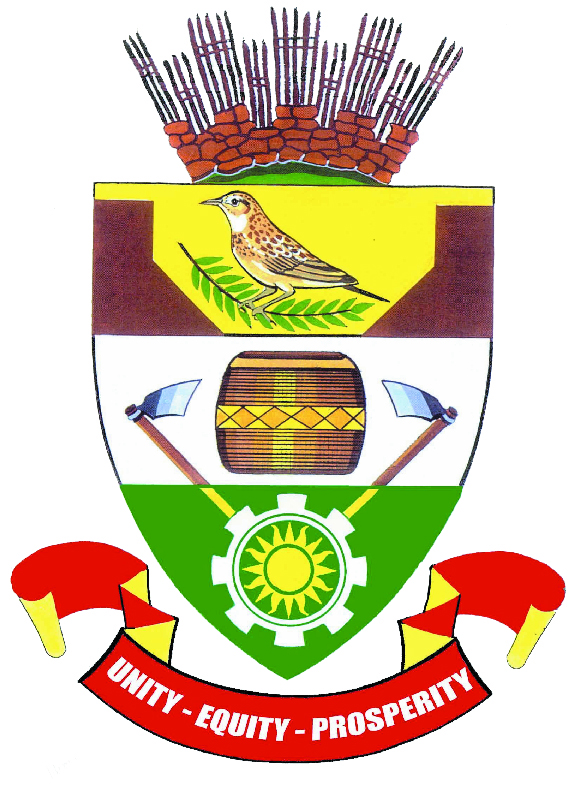
- Seal Coat of arms
- Nickname: The City of Stars
- Motto: Unity - Equity - Progress - Prosperity

- Location within Limpopo Location within South Africa
- Coordinates: 23°54′00″S 29°27′00″E
- Country: South Africa
- Province: Limpopo
- District: Capricorn
- Municipality: Polokwane
- Established: 1886
- Founder: Voortrekkers
- Named for: Petrus Jacobus Joubert

Government
  - Type: Local Municipality
  - Body: Polokwane Municipality
  - Executive Mayor: John Mpe (ANC)

Area
  - Total: 106.84 km^{2} (41.25 sq mi)
- Elevation: 1,310 m (4,300 ft)

Population (2011)
  - Total: 130,028
  - Density: 1,217.0/km^{2} (3,152.1/sq mi)

Racial makeup (2011)
  - Black African: 74.4%
  - White: 18.2%
  - Coloured: 3.7%
  - Indian/Asian: 3.1%
  - Other: 0.5%

First languages (2011)
  - Sepedi: 45.9%
  - Afrikaans: 19.8%
  - English: 10.3%
  - Venda: 6.7%
  - Other: 17.3%
- Time zone: UTC+2 (SAST)
- Postal code (street): 0699
- PO box: 0700
- Area code: 015
- Bird: Northern royal albatross
- Flower: Blue squill
- Website: www.polokwane.gov.za

Polokwane (UK: /ˌpɒləˈkwɑːni/, meaning "Sanctuary" in Northern Sotho), formerly and sometimes also known as Pietersburg, is the capital city of the Limpopo Province of South Africa. It is the country's largest urban centre north of Gauteng. It was also one of the nine host cities of the 2010 FIFA World Cup.

== History ==
=== Early history ===
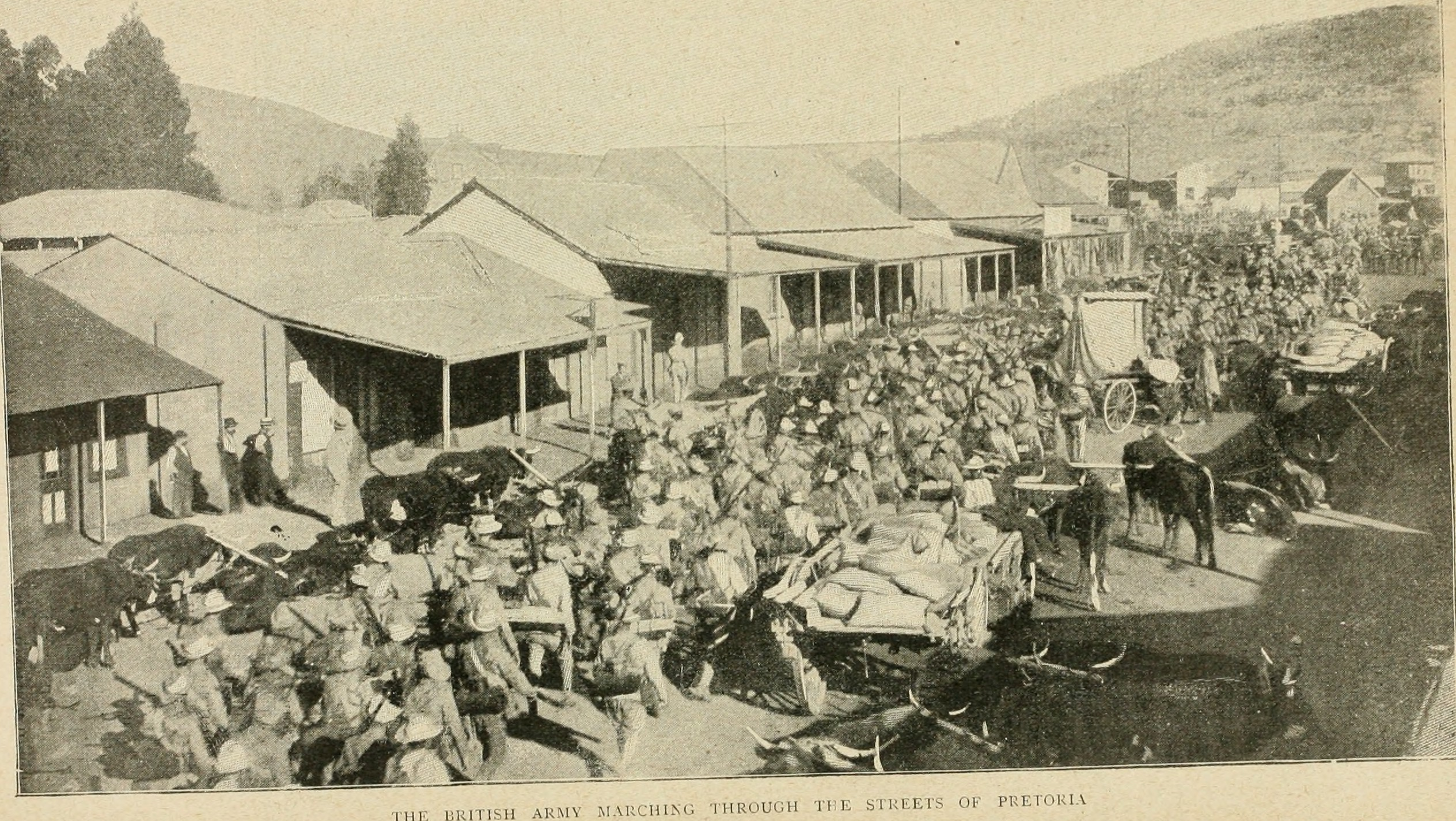
The Boer War (1901)

In the 1840s, Voortrekkers under the leadership of Andries Hendrik Potgieter established Zoutpansbergdorp, a town 100 km (62 mi) to the north. This settlement had to be abandoned because of clashes with the local tribes (Lebelo, Langa & Ledwaba clans), they founded a new town in 1886 and named it "Pietersburg" in honour of Voortrekker leader Petrus Jacobus Joubert. A small number of Indian/Asian and coloured people settled into the region before the end of the 19th century. It was the capital of the Transvaal and the Orange Free State for a short time in 1900 during the Second Boer War. The British occupied Pietersburg in 1901 and built a concentration camp to incarcerate almost 4,000 Boer women and children.

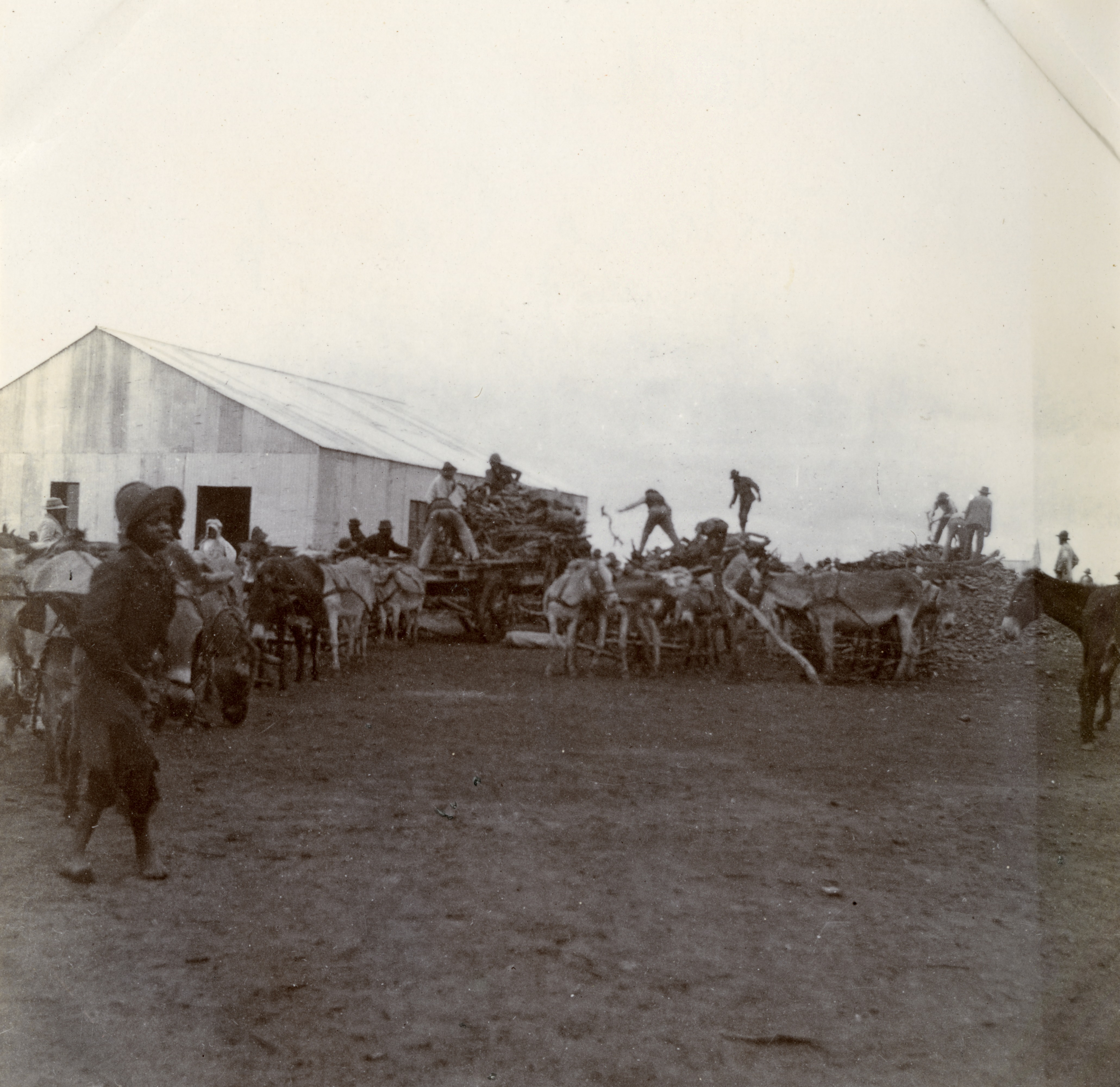
Pietersburg Camp (1901)

=== Years of apartheid ===
Like many places in South Africa at the time of apartheid, racial segregation and inequality were fundamentally ingrained into the town, following the end of the Second Boer War, together with the formation of the Union of South Africa in 1910, institutional laws were in place in terms of divided urban planning which were implemented continuously throughout this era. The commencement of apartheid in 1948 meant that Pietersburg was clearly segregated in both residential regions and for business ventures.

The institutionalization of the notorious Group Areas Act in 1950 and its amendments in 1966 ensured that the spatial development of the Central Business District (CBD) was exclusively for people of European descent while other regions of the CBD being exclusively for races such as "Indian centre" for Indians/Asians. Many regions were designated to only a specific race of people such as the suburbs of Nirvana and Westenburg at the northwest of the town only being occupied by Indian/Asian and Coloured groups respectively, while the suburb of Bendor being reserved for Whites. The townships of Seshego and Mankweng were occupied by the Black population. Removals of minority groups for white residency, whites-only owned industrial sectors and a regular barrier between people of different races were heavily enforced.

=== Since 1994 ===
The town officially became a city on 23 April 1992 and on 27 April 1994, it became the capital of the newly formed Northern Transvaal province (Later changed to "Northern province" and thereafter Limpopo) following the 1994 South African general elections. On 25 February 2005, the government declared the official name of the city as Polokwane, a name that was generally in use by the speakers of Northern Sotho (Sepedi). The city was host to the 52nd national conference of the African National Congress, held in December 2007 at the University of Limpopo and saw Jacob Zuma voted as President of the ANC, beating former president Thabo Mbeki.

=== Present ===
Today the city of Polokwane has seen respectable development in terms of infrastructure and services. The city provides a wide variety of shopping, malls, restaurants, entertainment venues, religious venues, civic halls, as well as modern housing developments and office buildings.

== Political governance ==
The Polokwane Municipality is run by the African National Congress (ANC) with a 60% majority obtained in the last 2021 Municipal Elections. In a by-election held on 24 April 2024, Ward 10 was won by ANC councillor candidate Willie Madikoto after the arrest and resignation of the previous Economic Freedom Fighters (EFF) councillor Jacob Seshokadue due to alleged theft of firearms.

== Ailing Infrastructure and Poor Service Delivery ==
Despite the development the city has seen, it has been plagued with persistent issues of poor service delivery, which has led to crucial service infrastructure such as electricity, water, and sewage systems neglection.

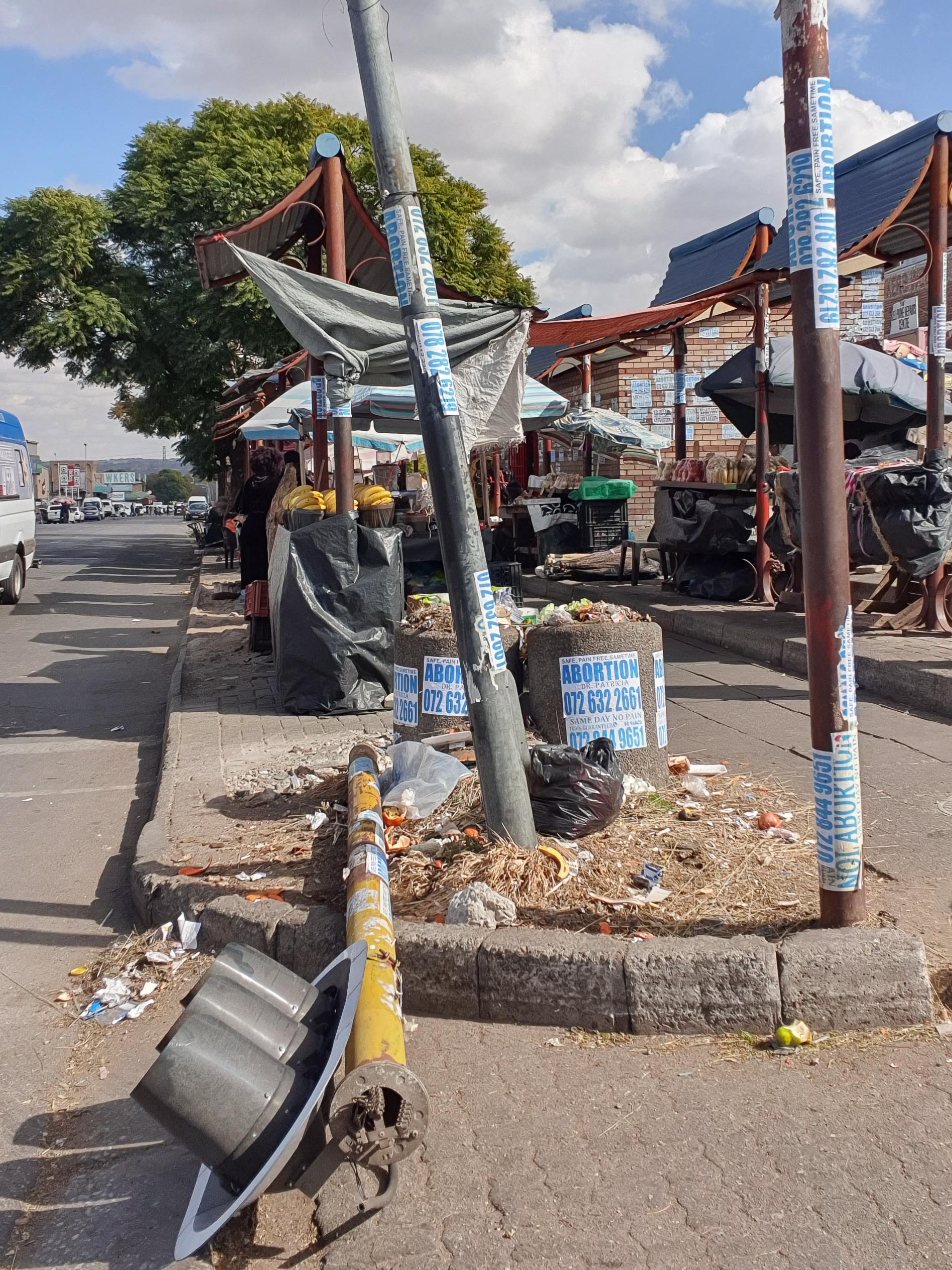
Sights like these are common in almost every part of the city

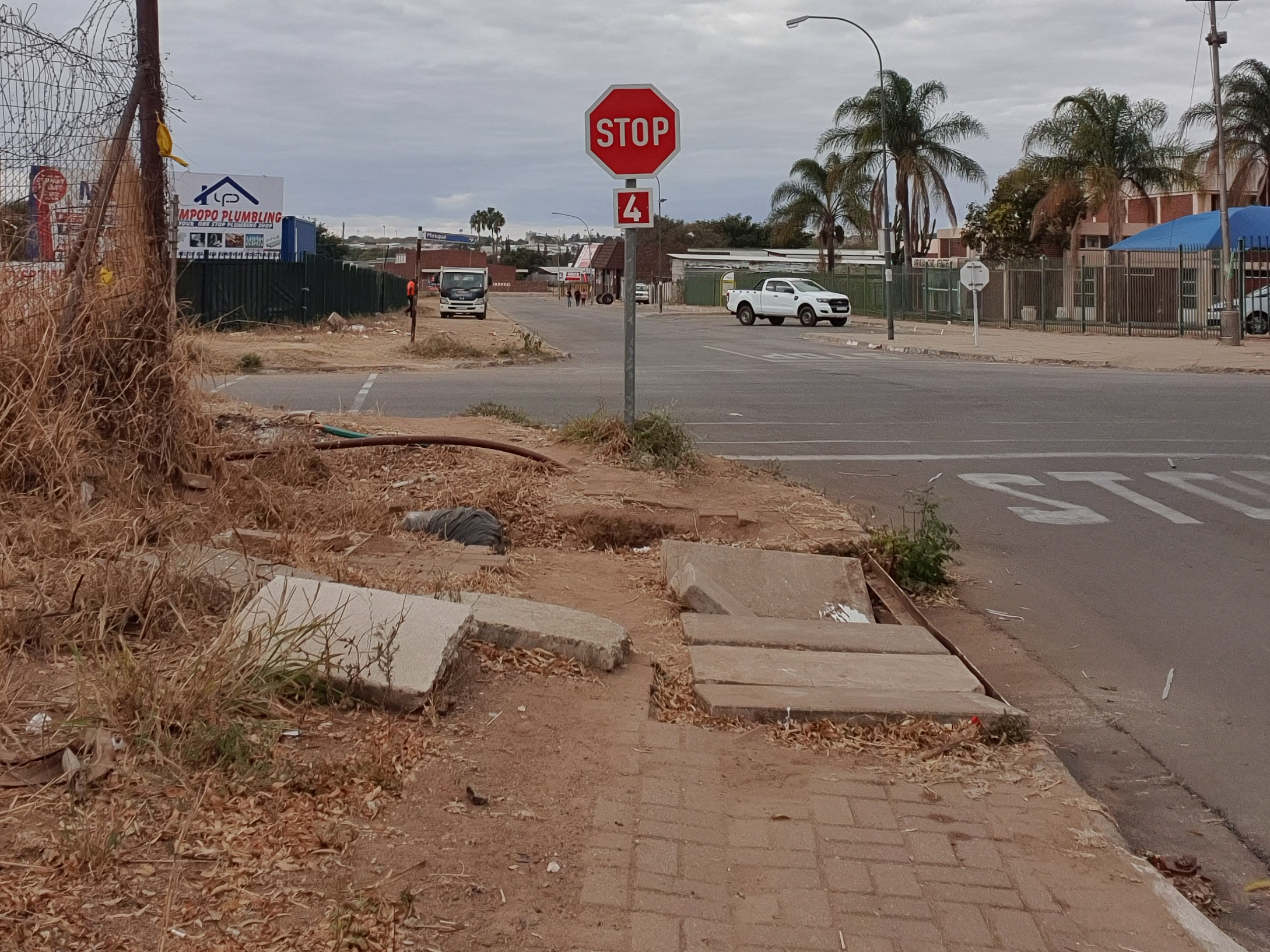
Damaged storm water drain in the suburb of Nirvana

== Demographics ==
The population in 2011 was about 130,000 . Roughly 45.9% of people in the city are Sepedi (Northern Sotho) speakers. A large portion of the white population are Afrikaners, and roughly 10,000 residents (roughly 8%) are English-speaking whites who are primarily South Africans of British descent and White Zimbabweans, the latter moved to the area after the year 2000. Roughly 6.7% of people are Venda people.

Population Group	Percentage
African	74.4%
Coloured	3.7%
Indian/Asian	3.1%
White	18.2%

=== Districts/suburbs/townships ===
The city is divided into seven clusters and forty-five wards.

1. Mankweng Cluster with wards: 06,07,25,26,27,28,34 – 20 km east of the city centre.
2. Moletjie Cluster with wards: 09,10,15,16,18,35,36,38
3. Molepo / Chuene / Maja Cluster with wards: 1,2,3,4,5 – 20 km south of the city centre.
4. Sebayeng / Dikgale Cluster with wards: 24,29,32,33,30,31 – 30 km northeast of the city centre.
5. Aganang Cluster with wards: 40,41,42,43,44,45
6. City Cluster with wards: 08;19,20,21,22,23,39
7. Seshego Cluster with wards: 11,12,13,14,17,37 - on the north-west outskirts of the city.

Suburbs in the city include Nirvana, Westenburg, Bendor, Welgelegen, Moregloed, Annadale, Ivydale, Flora Park, Fauna Park, Greenside, Penina Park, Ivy Park, Hospital Park, Ster Park, Dalmada, Broadlands, Woodlands, Southern Gateway and Thornhill.

== Climate ==
The city has a semiarid climate under the Köppen climate classification. Despite its position on the Tropic of Capricorn, the climate is tempered by its position on a plateau 1230 m above sea level. Average temperatures reach around 21–22 °C (70–72 °F) in January and fall to 11 °C (52 °F) in July. As with much of inland South Africa, Polokwane has experienced notably warmer seasons over the last decade than its long-term average. The city has a dry climate with a summer rainy season and a pronounced dry spell during winter. Average annual rainfall is 495 mm (19.5 in), with December or (less often) January the wettest month and July the driest.

Jacaranda trees line many streets in the city, blooming purple blossoms in October every year.

Climate data for Polokwane, elevation 1,224 m (4,016 ft), (1991−2020 normals, extremes 1953–present)
Month	Jan	Feb	Mar	Apr	May	Jun	Jul	Aug	Sep	Oct	Nov	Dec	Year
Record high °C (°F)	37.1 (98.8)	38.4 (101.1)	34.5 (94.1)	33.9 (93.0)	32.8 (91.0)	28.6 (83.5)	27.8 (82.0)	32.0 (89.6)	36.8 (98.2)	37.0 (98.6)	37.4 (99.3)	36.8 (98.2)	38.4 (101.1)
Mean daily maximum °C (°F)	28.2 (82.8)	28.4 (83.1)	27.3 (81.1)	25.3 (77.5)	23.5 (74.3)	21.1 (70.0)	20.8 (69.4)	23.4 (74.1)	26.5 (79.7)	27.3 (81.1)	27.4 (81.3)	27.8 (82.0)	25.6 (78.1)
Daily mean °C (°F)	22.7 (72.9)	22.6 (72.7)	21.4 (70.5)	18.8 (65.8)	15.8 (60.4)	13.1 (55.6)	12.7 (54.9)	15.2 (59.4)	18.6 (65.5)	20.4 (68.7)	21.3 (70.3)	22.2 (72.0)	18.7 (65.7)
Mean daily minimum °C (°F)	17.1 (62.8)	16.9 (62.4)	15.5 (59.9)	12.2 (54.0)	8.2 (46.8)	5.2 (41.4)	4.6 (40.3)	7.0 (44.6)	10.6 (51.1)	13.5 (56.3)	15.2 (59.4)	16.6 (61.9)	11.9 (53.4)
Record low °C (°F)	9.8 (49.6)	10.6 (51.1)	7.9 (46.2)	3.6 (38.5)	0.2 (32.4)	−3.5 (25.7)	−3.2 (26.2)	−2.4 (27.7)	0.2 (32.4)	5.0 (41.0)	6.9 (44.4)	8.8 (47.8)	−3.5 (25.7)
Average precipitation mm (inches)	84.5 (3.33)	65.8 (2.59)	52.4 (2.06)	30.7 (1.21)	11.4 (0.45)	2.6 (0.10)	2.1 (0.08)	1.6 (0.06)	4.7 (0.19)	37.2 (1.46)	88.5 (3.48)	93.2 (3.67)	474.7 (18.69)
Average precipitation days (≥ 1.0 mm)	7.0	5.5	5.3	3.1	1.3	0.6	0.4	0.2	0.8	3.8	7.3	7.9	43.2
Average relative humidity (%)	69	70	71	69	64	61	58	56	55	61	66	69	64
Mean monthly sunshine hours	247.1	225.0	234.8	241.3	280.0	265.6	280.9	289.4	274.3	268.1	235.2	238.9	3,080.5
Source 1: NOAA (humidity 1961–1990)
Source 2: Meteo Climat (record highs and lows)

== Transport ==
=== Roads ===
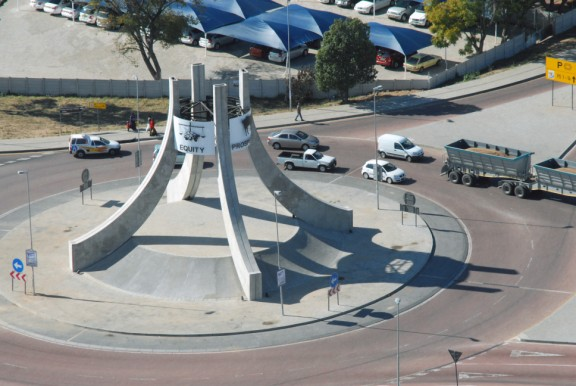
Nelson Mandela road traffic island on the approach to the city

The city lies roughly halfway between Gauteng (300 kilometres (190 mi)) and the Zimbabwean border (200 kilometres (120 mi)) on the N1 toll highway, which connects Zimbabwe with the major cities in South Africa, such as Pretoria, Johannesburg, Bloemfontein, and Cape Town.

The R37 provincial route connects the city with Mbombela. Running east, the R71 connects the city with Tzaneen, Phalaborwa, Bushbuckridge, and the Kruger National Park. To the north-east is the R81 connecting the city with Giyani and Malamulele. The R521 connects the city with Alldays and the R567 via Seshego connects Polokwane with the N11. The R71 is also well known to bikers who ride through the city annually, making it the biggest bike meeting in Africa.

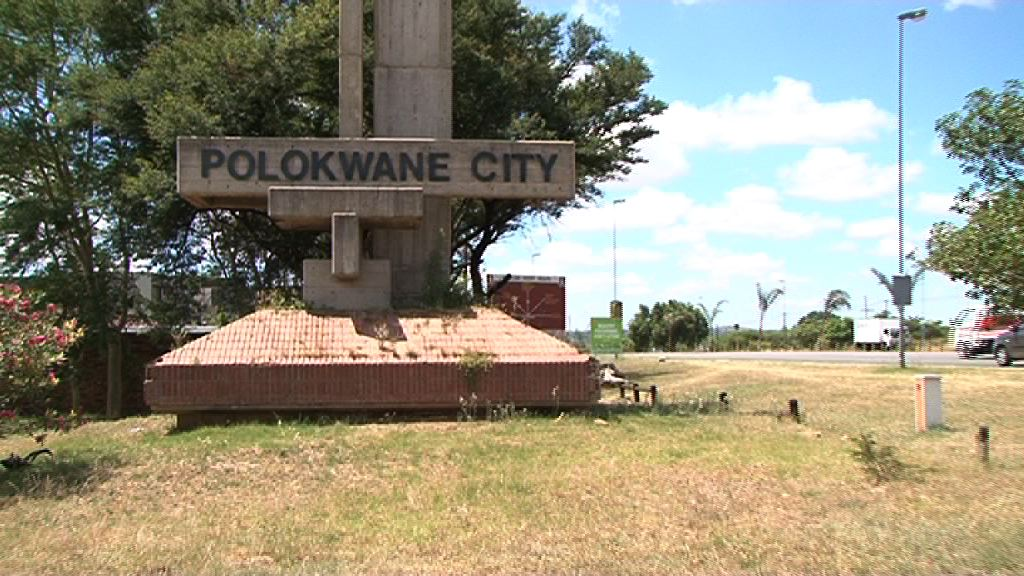
The sign when entering the city

The Nelson Mandela road traffic island is situated on the outskirts of Polokwane when approaching from the direction of Johannesburg. It was built prior to the 2010 FIFA World Cup as part of beautifying the city for the event.

A number of private bus services run in the city and also services connect Polokwane to other major centres in the country.

=== Air ===
The city is served by two airports. A public airport, the Polokwane International Airport, (IATA: PTG, ICAO: FAPP) is north of the city, while the smaller Pietersburg Civilian Aerodrome (ICAO: FAPI) is south-east of the city.

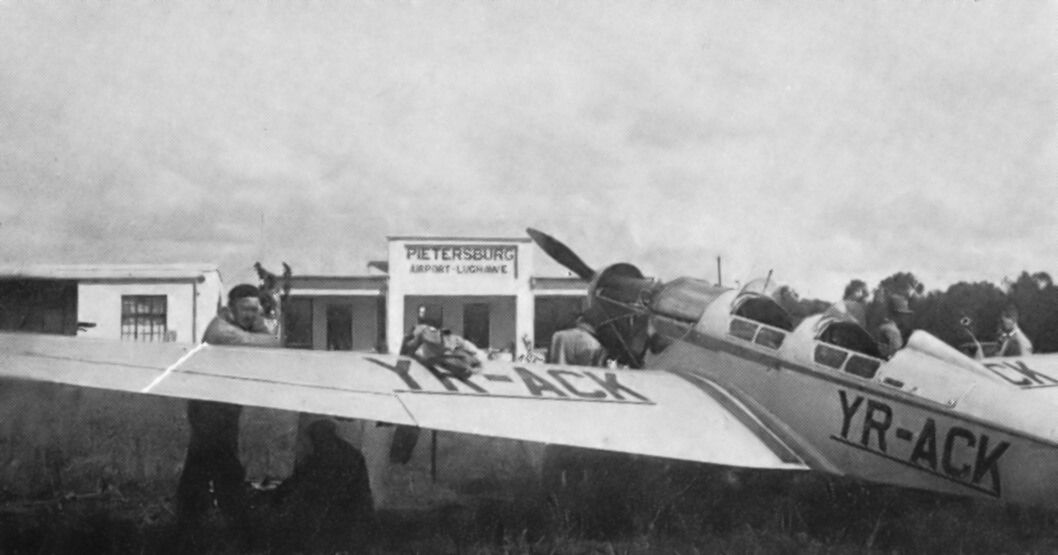
YR-ACK at the Polokwane (Pietersburg) airport (1935)

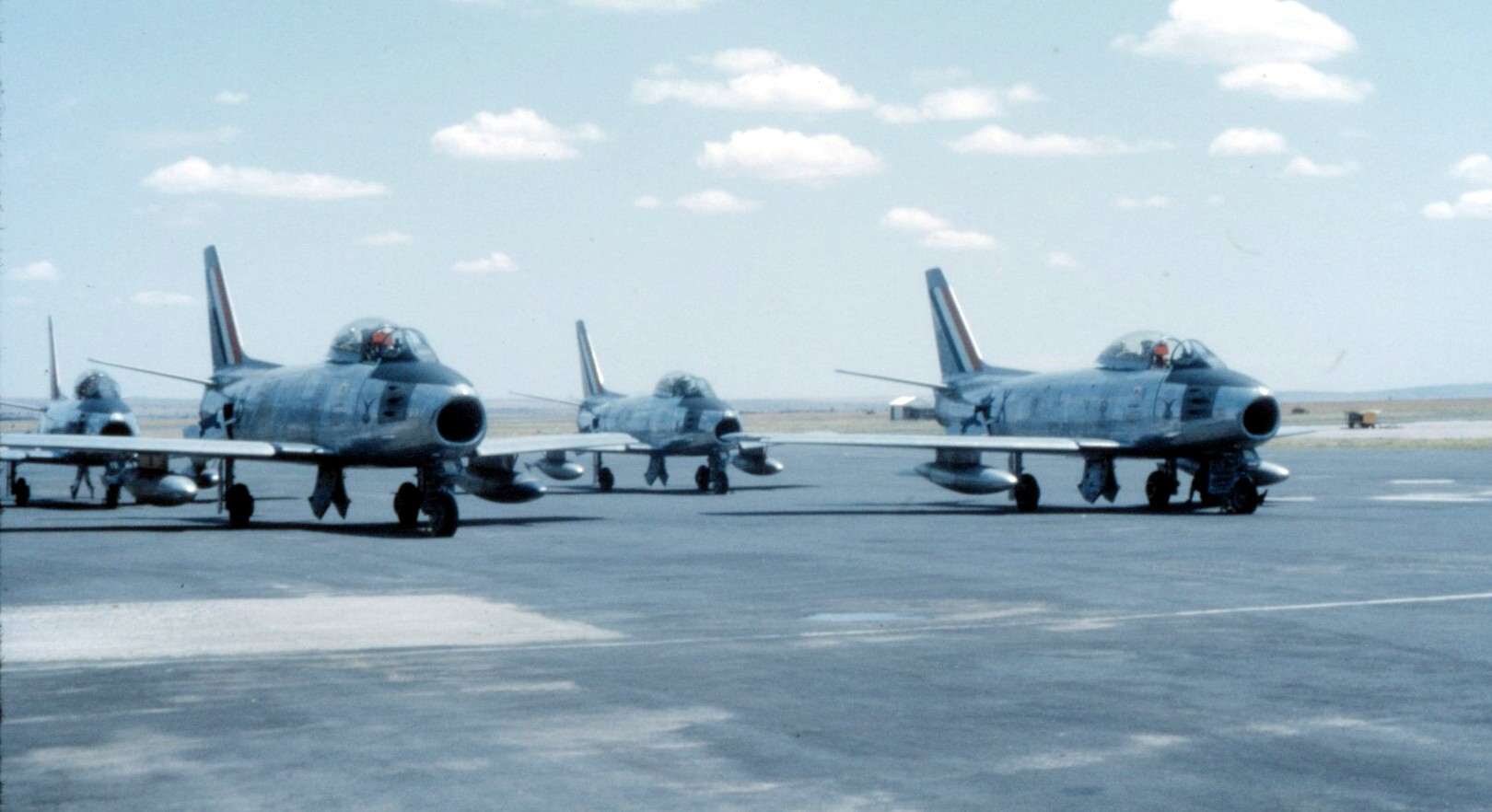
Squadron Sabre 352-Bs at the Pietersburg AFB

=== Railways ===
The city is connected to Johannesburg and other major centres by rail. Agricultural produce, including tomatoes, citrus fruit, sugar cane, peanuts, tea, bananas, and avocados, are transported by rail.

== Society and culture ==
=== Media ===
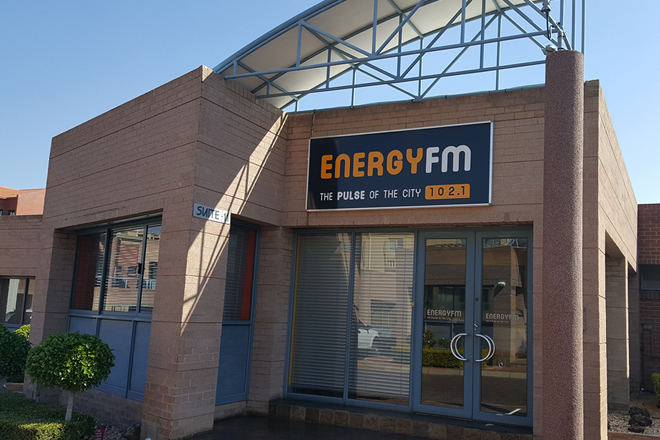
Energy FM office in the city

The South African Broadcasting Corporation (SABC) has a branch in the city. The city also has a branch of the country's largest independent radio station, Jacaranda RM/FM, which broadcasts from Pretoria, Nelspruit and Polokwane.

The first commercial radio station in Limpopo, CapricornFM, broadcasts from the city. Two additional radio stations are also in Polokwane. These include Energy FM and Munghana Lonene FM.

The city has a selection of locally distributed newspapers. Two notable newspapers include The Review and The Polokwane Observer.

=== Gambling ===
The Sun International casino and hotel is in the city. Meropa Casino and Entertainment World is a Moroccan-style, 24-hour casino with various outdoor entertainment amenities such as go-karts, minigolf, and a wildlife park.

=== Museums, monuments and memorials ===
- The Bakone Malapa Northern Sotho Open-Air Museum — Depicts the traditional and modern-day lifestyle of the Bakone people. The museum is centred on a traditional village still occupied by members of the tribe, who sell various crafts to tourists. Background information can be obtained in the visitor centre. Within the museum complex are archaeological sites with remains of iron- and copper-smelting installations, as well as rock paintings from around 1000 B.C.
- Sumayela Heritage - the region also hosts a rich heritage of tekela nguni traditional communities ( mainly Lebelo, Kekana - Langa & Ledwaba ) known as ama sumayela ndebele
- Eersteling Monuments — The site of the country's first gold crushing site and its first gold power plant are marked by monuments.
- The Hugh Exton Photographic Museum — the former Dutch Reformed Church building
- The Irish House — Historic building which functions as a museum.

=== Places of worship ===
Roman Catholic Church in the city

The largest Christian gathering in South Africa happens twice a year at Zion City, Moria near Polokwane, at Easter and again for the September end of year festival. The Zion Christian Church's headquarters are at Zion City Moria, about 25 kilometres east of the city. ZCC is an entirely black denomination with about 16 million members, formed in 1924 by Ignatius Lekganyane - an indigenous church, not established by evangelists from abroad. The Star of David is the symbol of the ZCC and the two congregations that make up the church are today led by the grandsons of its founder - Barnabas Lekganyane and Saint Engenas Lekganyane. The ZCC is characterised by the emphasis it places on faith healing, purification rites, dancing, night communion, river baptism, the holy spirit, taboos and prophesying. The church celebrated its 100th year of existence during the September pilgrimage in 2024, which was attended by the provincial government leadership, kings, chiefs, congregates and other dignitaries. The ZCC has members in every country in Africa, and in most countries of the Middle East.

=== Synagogues ===
The first Jewish settlers in Pietersburg arrived between 1890 and 1900 from Lithuania, Russia, and Latvia, and the Pietersburg Hebrew Congregation was founded in 1897. A synagogue was built on Jorissen Street in 1921. The Jewish community grew rapidly in the 1930s and 1940s; a larger synagogue was built in 1953 and the old synagogue was then converted into a communal hall. The number of Jews in Pietersburg began to decline from the late 1950s. In 2003, as the congregation had dwindled, the synagogue was closed and its benches, bimah, and other contents were shipped to Israel, where they were installed in the Mevasser Synagogue in Tel Mond in memory of the Pietersburg synagogue.

== Sports ==
=== Football ===
Polokwane City and Baroka are soccer clubs based in the city.

=== Golf ===
The Pietersburg Golf Club along with the golf course was established in the late 1800s. The course comprises a full 18 holes. Retief Goosen (born 3 February 1969) was born in Pietersburg and honed his skills at the Pietersburg Golf Club.

=== Cricket ===
The Polokwane Cricket Club is one of the oldest in the country and was established in 1902. Limpopo's cricket team, which plays first-class and List A cricket, is based in Polokwane at the Polokwane Cricket Club Ground.

The suburb Nirvana holds an annual cricket competition called the "Nirvana Premier League" in which teams from all around the city and the province take part in.

=== Netball ===
The Limpopo Baobabs represents the city as well as the province of Limpopo in the Telkom Netball League. Lenize Potgieter was also born in Polokwane.

=== Rugby ===
Noordelikes Rugby Club is an amateur rugby club based in the city.

From 2013 to 2015, the city hosted a provincial team, the Limpopo Blue Bulls, in the Vodacom Cup, as a feeder team to the Blue Bulls of Pretoria. The team broke several unwanted records, including the biggest first class loss in South African rugby history, when they lost 161–3 to the Golden Lions on 27 April 2013.

Springbok rugby captain, Victor Matfield grew up in Pietersburg. Former Springbok rugby captain John Smit was born in Pietersburg.

=== Swimming ===
The city has a number of swimming clubs. Former Olympic gold-medalist and world-record swimmer Lyndon Ferns is from the city.

=== Tennis ===
A large tennis club is situated in the city, and various local tournaments are held regularly.

=== Baseball ===
In 2017, Gift Ngoepe, born in Pietersburg, became the first African player in the Major League Baseball, playing shortstop and second base for the Pittsburgh Pirates. Ngoepe's mother Maureen managed the baseball clubhouse in Randburg, near Johannesburg. Ngoepe's brother Victor also plays in the Pirates' farm system

=== Stadiums ===
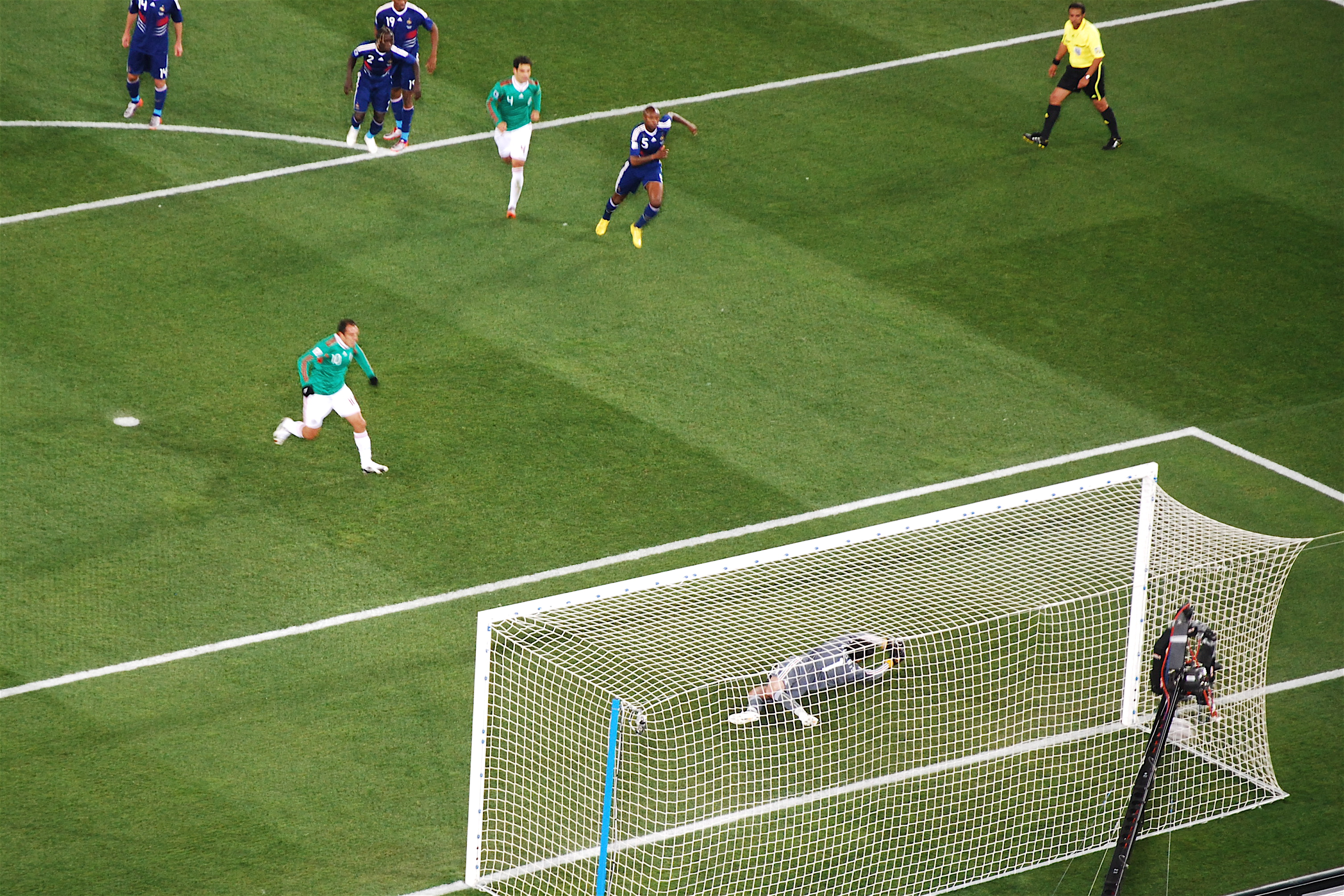
France vs Mexico at Peter Mokaba Stadium

Peter Mokaba Stadium

- Peter Mokaba Stadium, constructed for the 2010 FIFA World Cup
- Pietersburg Stadium

== Tourism ==
War memorial outside the Polokwane Art Gallery consisting of hundreds of guns melted after the Anglo-Boer war

The city provides access to various nature and wildlife viewing opportunities for ecotourists. The Polokwane Bird and Reptile Park is home to over 280 species of birds. The Polokwane Game Reserve houses various South African species of wildlife, birdlife, and plants in an unspoiled bushveld environment. The Moletzie Bird Sanctuary protects rare birds like the Cape vulture. The Modjadji Rainforest near Duiwelskloof holds the largest concentration of indigenous cycads in the world, and Cheune Crocodile Farm provides a place to learn about the life of crocodiles.

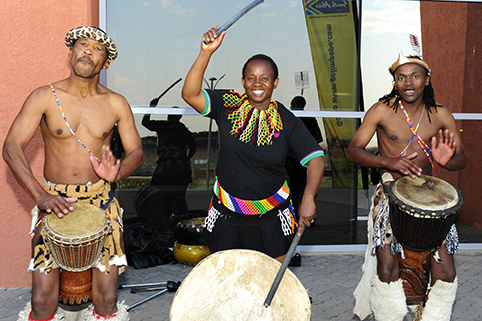
The city has a rich African culture

An extensive art collection is preserved in the city's art gallery, open to the public. The city has more public sculptures per capita in its parks than elsewhere in South Africa. It was also the first city to unveil a bust of the ex-president Nelson Mandela in its City Square (Civic Gardens), and it was authorised by Nelson Mandela personally. The city is considered the premier hunting destination in South Africa.

== Commerce ==
The city hosts several major industries such as Coca-Cola, Freshmark (a division of Shoprite Checkers), and South African Breweries. As the capital of the Limpopo province, the city also has a large commercial area with the four largest banks in the country all having at least three branches in the city. The city was well known for its manufacturing facility in Seshego of Tempest radios and hi-fis, the largest employer in the region.

== Education ==
=== Tertiary education ===
The Tshwane University of Technology, Capricorn TVET College, and the University of South Africa have satellite campuses in the city. The University of Limpopo's Turfloop campus is situated about 30 km east of Polokwane.

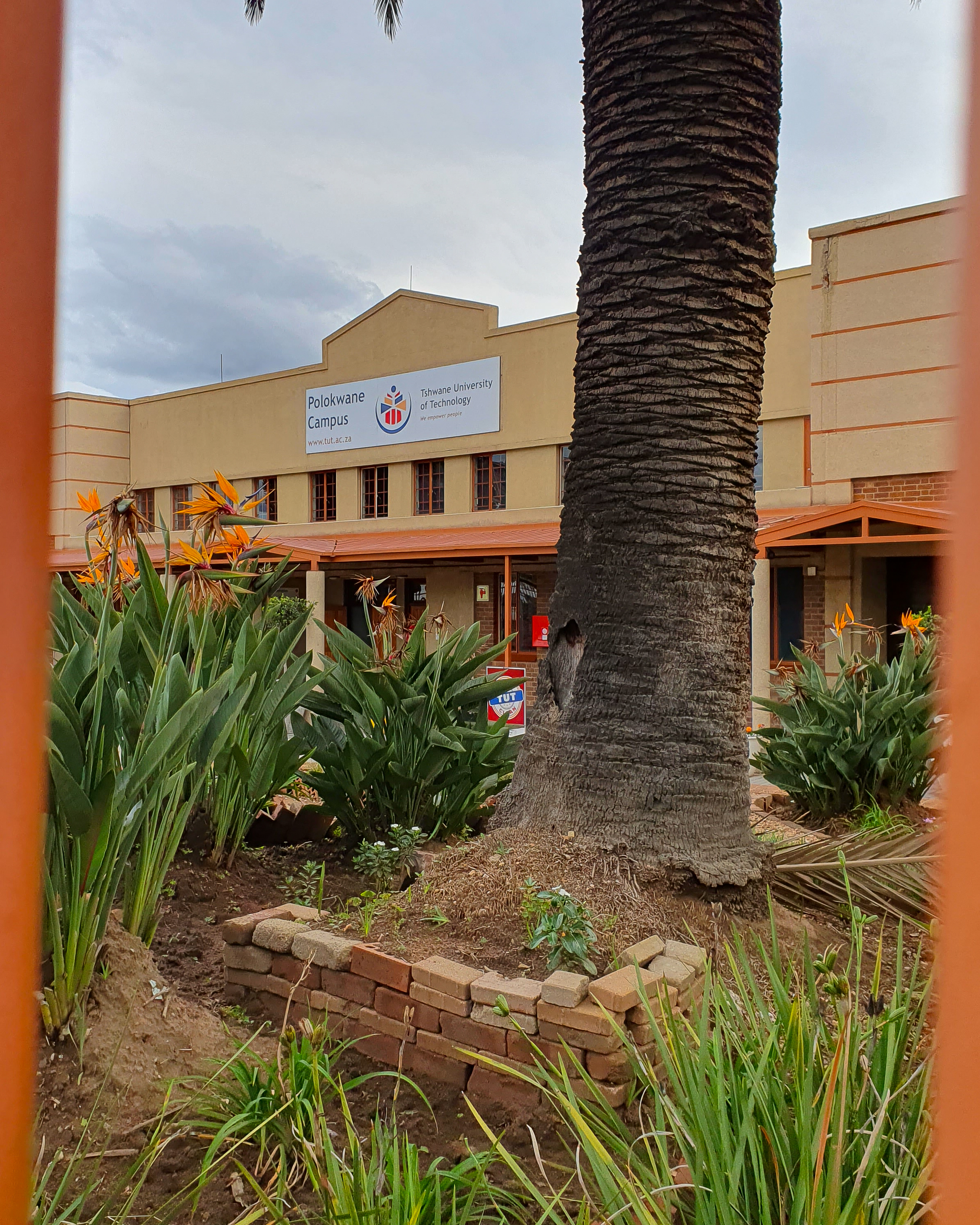
Tshwane University of Technology's Polokwane Campus

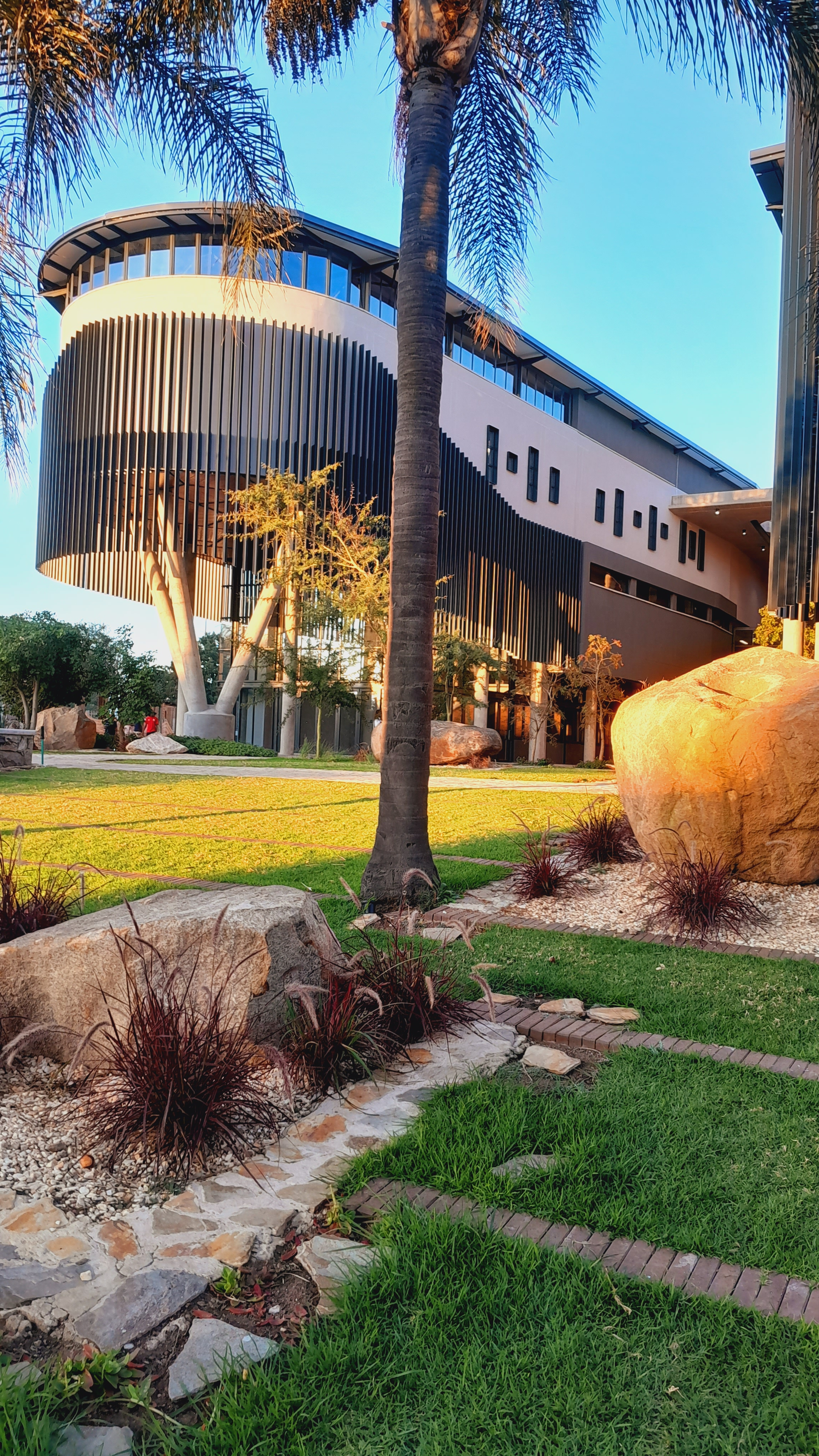
University of Limpopo's Science Laboratory

== Shopping malls and venues ==
=== Malls ===
- Mall of the North
- Savannah Mall

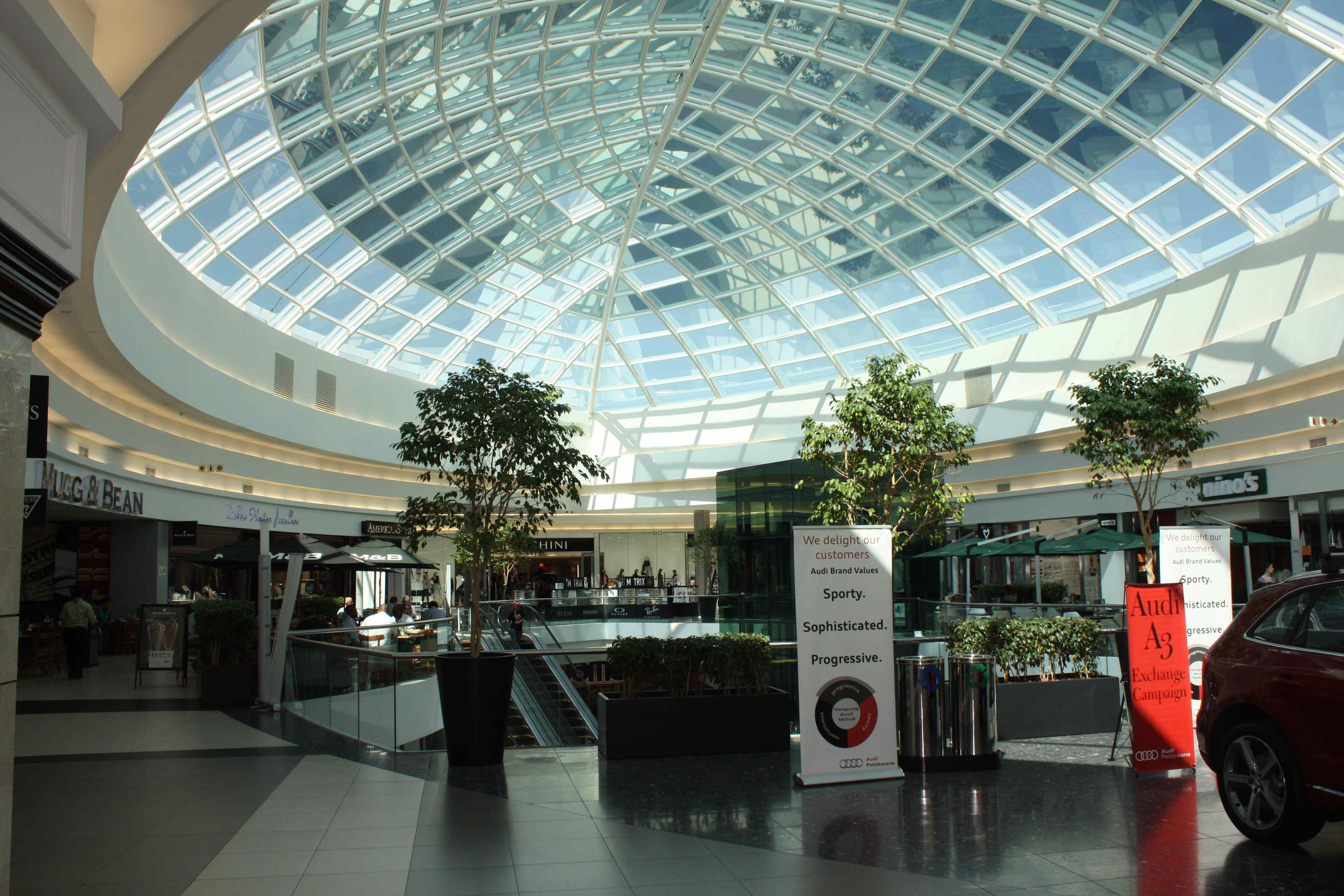
Inside of Mall of the North

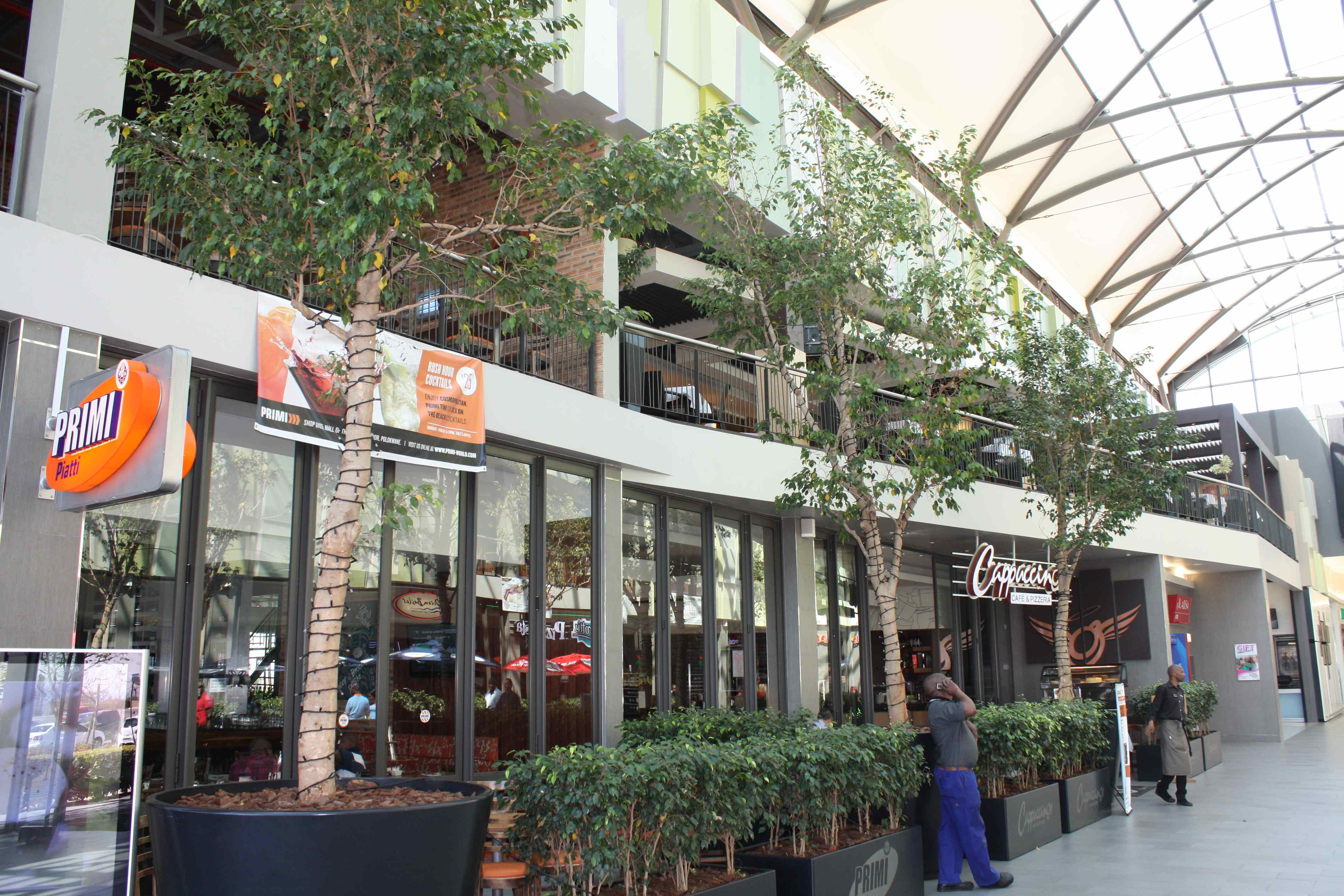
Inside of Savannah Mall

=== Shopping venues and centres ===
- Cycad Centre
- The Greenery

== Sister cities ==
Polokwane is a sister city with:

- Reggio Emilia, Italy
- Bulawayo, Zimbabwe

== Notable people ==
- Lyndon Ferns, Olympic gold-medalist and former world record swimmer
- Sylvia Glasser, choreographer
- Retief Goosen, professional golfer who was in the top ten in the Official World Golf Ranking for over 250 weeks between 2001 and 2007
- Dawie Groenewald, game farmer and convicted wildlife trafficker
- Lucas Malan, Afrikaans academic and poet
- Julius Malema, leader of the Economic Freedom Fighters and former ANC Youth League president
- Isaac Lesiba Maphotho, anti-apartheid activist, African National Congress (ANC) member and Umkhonto we Sizwe (MK) veteran
- Victor Matfield, former South African national rugby team captain
- Peter Mokaba, controversial anti-apartheid activist
- Mvzzle, DJ and record producer known for producing "Umlilo" by DJ Zinhle
- Gift Ngoepe, professional baseball player
- Tlou Segolela, professional football player
- Caster Semenya, middle-distance runner and world champion
- John Smit, former South African national rugby team captain
- Marthinus van Schalkwyk, former Minister of Tourism in the Cabinet of South Africa
- Frederik van Zyl Slabbert, political analyst, businessman and politician
- Deon Fourie, academic and army general

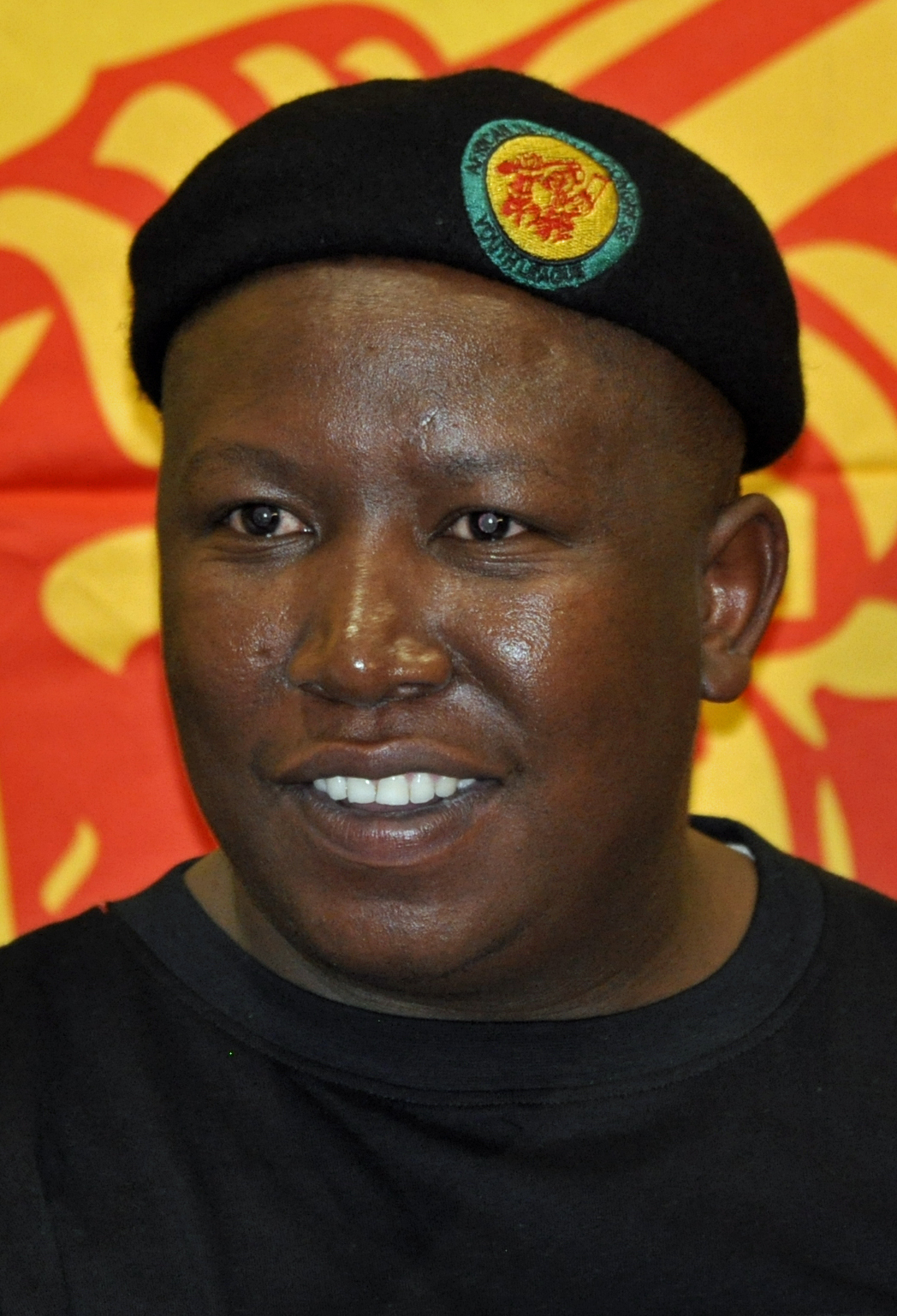
Julius Malema (2011)

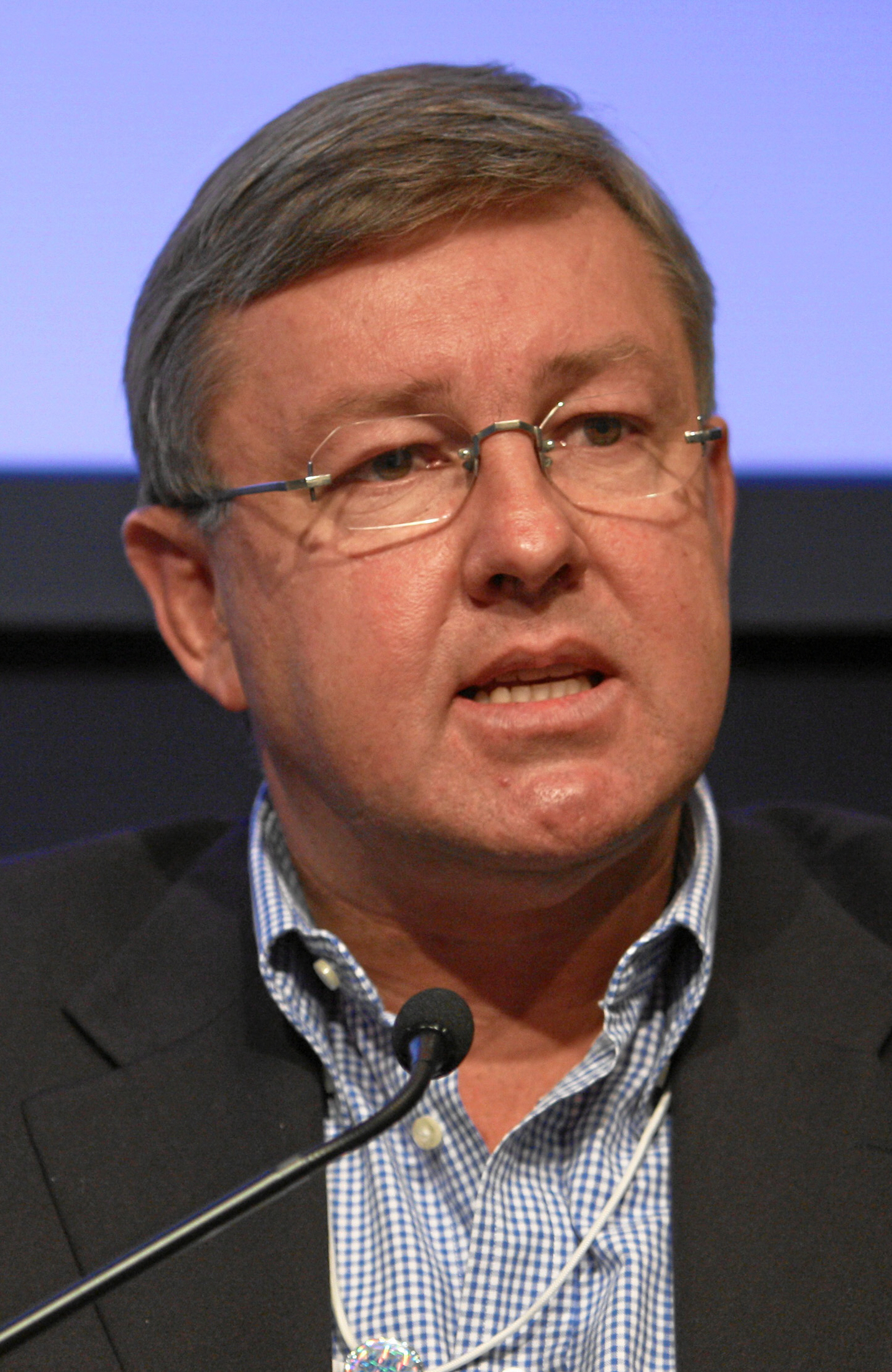
Marthinus van Schalkwyk (2009)

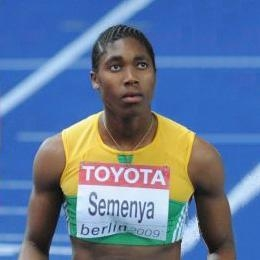
Caster Semenya (2009)

== Coats of arms ==
=== Municipal (1) ===
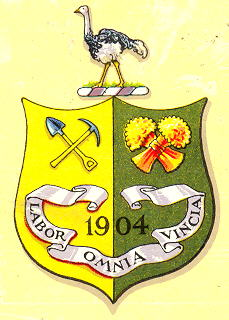
The Coat of Arms of Pietersburg from 1931 to 1967

By 1931, the Pietersburg municipal council had assumed a pseudo-heraldic "coat of arms". The shield depicted a crossed pick and shovel, two crossed wheatsheaves, and the date 1904 surrounded by a ribbon and bearing the motto Labor omnia vincit. The crest was an ostrich.

=== Municipal (2) ===
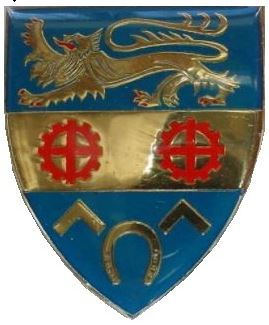
The Coat of Arms of Pietersburg from 1967 to 2003

A proper coat of arms was designed in the 1960s. It was registered with the Transvaal Provincial Administration in August 1967 and at the Bureau of Heraldry in September 1969.

The arms were : Azure, on a fess Argent, between in chief a lion passant Argent, armed and langued Gules, and in base two chevrons humette, and a horseshoe Argent, placed 2 and 1, two cogwheels Gules. In layman's terms, this was a blue shield displaying, from top to bottom, a silver lion with red tongue and claws, a silver stripe bearing two red cogwheels, and two silver chevrons and a horseshoe.

The crest was a golden eagle, and the motto, once again, was Labor omnia vincit.

=== Municipal (3) ===
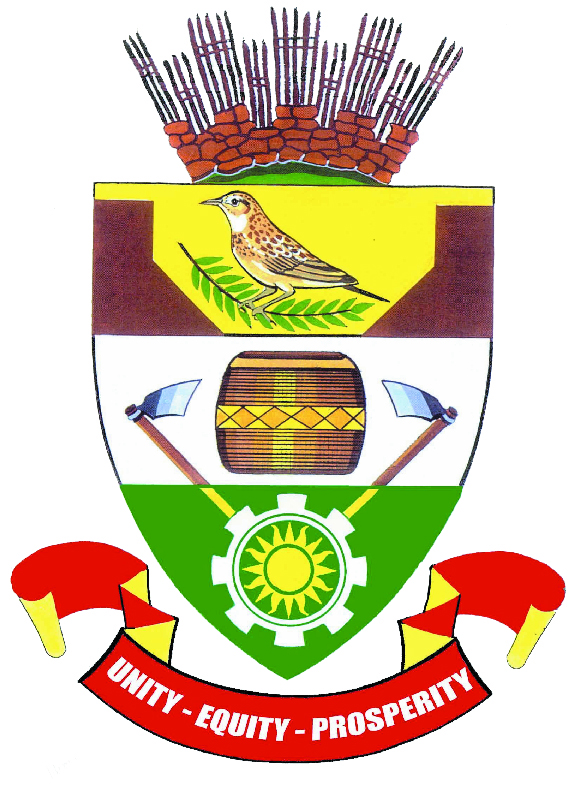
The Coat of Arms of Polokwane from 2003 onwards

The Pietersburg municipal council registered a new coat of arms at the Bureau in October 2003.

The arms are: Vert, on a fess Argent, a woven grain basket, between two hoes with blades turned inward proper, their handles towards centre-base counterchanged Or and issuant from a voided cogwheel the inner ring cotised Argent, therein a sun Or; on a chief of the last a short-clawed Lark (Mirafra chuana) perched upon a leaf of the silky thorn tree (Acacia rehmanniana) proper, between two demi-peaks with points embattled Brunatre, issuant from the respective shield flanks. In layman's terms, the shield depicts, from top to bottom, (1) a short-clawed lark perched on an acacia leaf between two stylised peaks, (2) a woven grain basket between two hoes on a silver background, and (3) a silver cogwheel on a green background.

Above the shield is a brown rustic crown. The motto is Unity - Equity - Progress - Prosperity.
