= Mall of the North =

Shopping mall in Polokwane, South Africa

- Logo since 2011

- Interactive map of the Mall of the North area
- Alternative names: MOTN; The North Mall

General information
- Status: Completed
- Type: Shopping mall
- Location: Bendor Park, South Africa, R81, Bendor Park, 0699
- Coordinates: 23.8737°S 29.5093°E
- Current tenants: List of Tenants
- Construction started: May 2009
- Construction stopped: April 2011
- Opened: 14 April 2011
- Cost: R1.2 billion
- Owner: Resilient REIT; Moolman Group; Flanagan & Gerard

Height
- Top floor: UF (Upper Floor Shopping Level)

Technical details
- Floor count: 2
- Floor area: 77 788m²

Design and construction
- Architect: MDS Architecture
- Developer: Resilient Properties Income Fund; Moolman Group; Flanagan & Gerard Property Development & Investments
- Structural engineer: L&S Consulting
- Civil engineer: L&S Consulting
- Other designers: Pienaar & Erwee (electrical engineer); Norval Wentzel Steinberg (quantity surveyor); PD Naidoo & Associates (traffic engineer); Rawlins Wales Partnership (electrical engineer); Charles Pein & Partners (mechanical engineer); Orion Project Managers (programme and tenant coordination)

Other information
- Number of stores: 180
- Parking: Free parking

Website
- mallofthenorth.co.za

Mall of the North (often shortened to MOTN), is a super regional shopping mall situated in Bendor Park, Polokwane in the Limpopo province of South Africa. It has a mix of shops, restaurants and a (Ster-Kinekor) cinema complex.

On April 14, 2011, Mall of the North was personally officiated by the former Premier of Limpopo, Cassel Mathale alongside the executive mayor of Polokwane, Freddy Greaver.

Pick n Pay and Checkers are the anchor tenants, they occupy more than 5 000m^{2} of floor space, as well as Edgars, Woolworths and Game.

== Statistics ==
Foot traffic per year. Adopted the Moolman Group and Mall of the North.

Key performance statistics
	2018	2019	2020	2021	2022	2023
January	705 588	674 588	682 721	603 530	670 724	678 728
February	592 564	620 394	663 060	586 267	577 104	585 327
March	706 798	726 798	603 808	602 116	644 253	661 082
April	685 068	672 688	310 588	576 264	645 659	693 284
May	662 146	668 342	461 561	620 730	637 831	633 243
June	706 555	702 422	512 671	574 894	613 870	637 328
July	736 366	693 412	545 906	588 594	685 740	696 654
August	703 542	720 836	590 232	606 003	616 611	656 716
September	696 125	694 044	595 822	618 844	634 038	691 726
October	679 310	671 916	658 570	682 903	711 862	685 746
November	754 558	764 243	681 361	690 716	714 348	702 036
December	1 003 121	995 740	908 201	958 606	999 762	1 002 313
Total	8 631 742	8 605 058	7 214 501	7 709 457	8 515 802	8 324 173

== Tenants ==
Mall of the North is composed of 180 stores including Pick n Pay, Woolworth, Checkers, Game and Edgars. Nationally, the mall include Trust worth, two Foschini stores neighboring each other, Mr. Price, Dis-Chem and Clicks. Anchors are aided by a range of fashion, footwear, sportswear, furnishings, home decor and healthcare stores. Includes international brands H&M, Pringle of Scotland, Lacoste, Polo, Levi's and international retailers Cotton On and Factories. Banks include African Bank, Standard Bank, ABSA, FNB, Old Mutual, Nedbank and Capitec Bank. Entertainment includes 6 Ster-Kinekor cines and The Fun Company.

== Services ==
=== Service options ===
- In-store shopping
- Lifts & escalators

=== Accessibility ===
- Wheelchair accessible entrance
- Wheelchair accessible lift
- Motorized, non-motorized
- Wheelchair rentals

=== Amenities ===
- Free Wi-Fi
- Public toilet
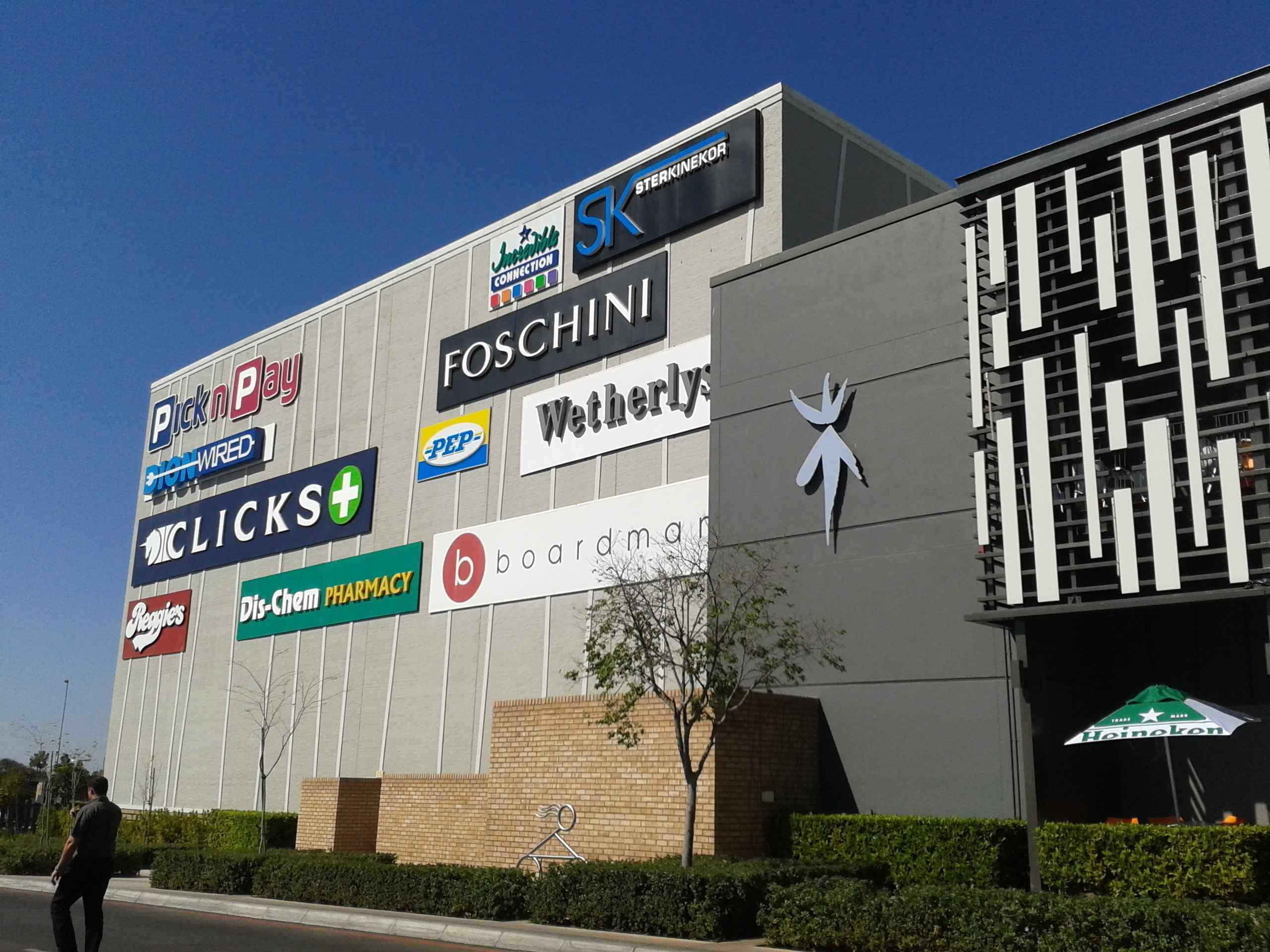
Entrance displaying some of the mall's stores

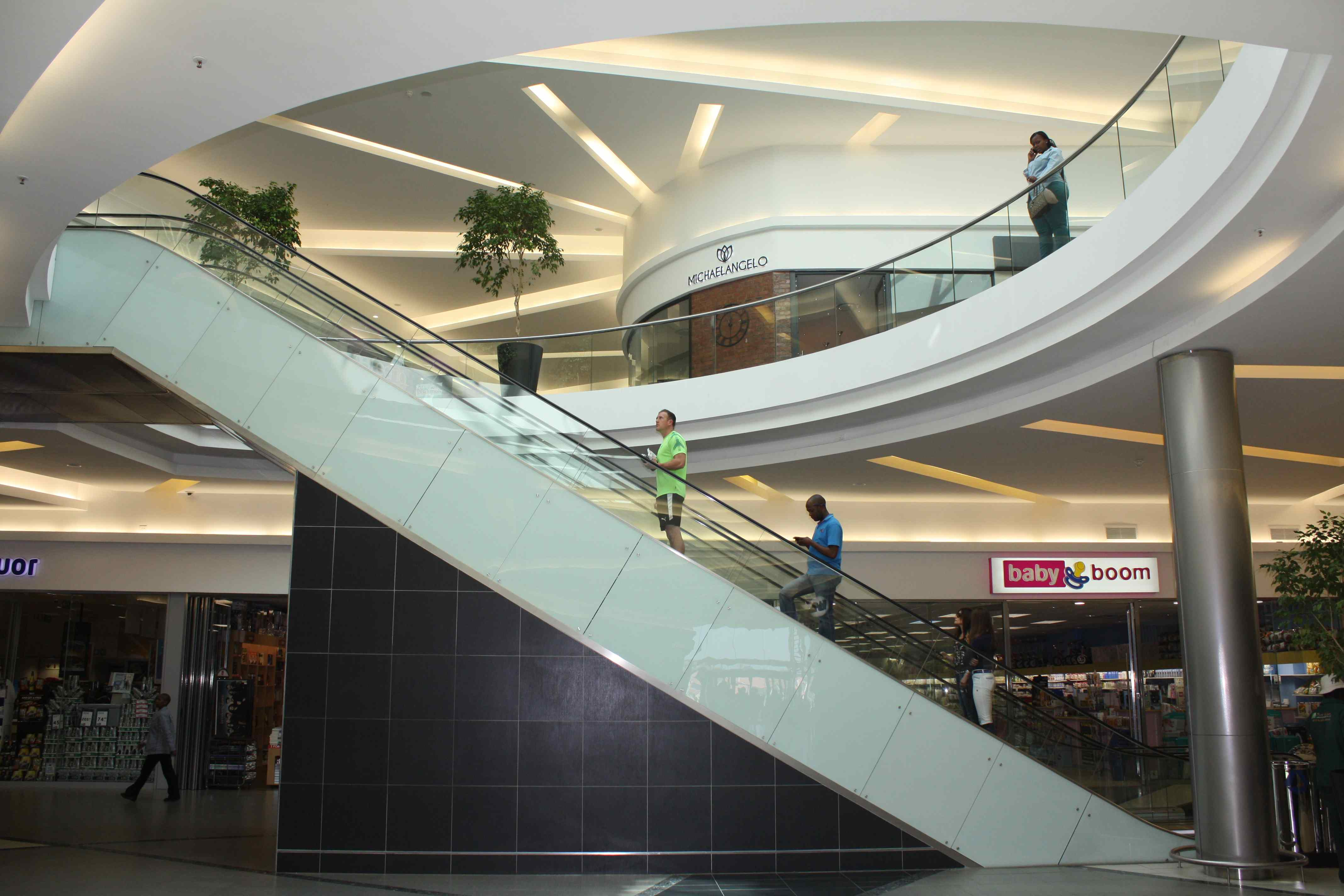
In-store shopping

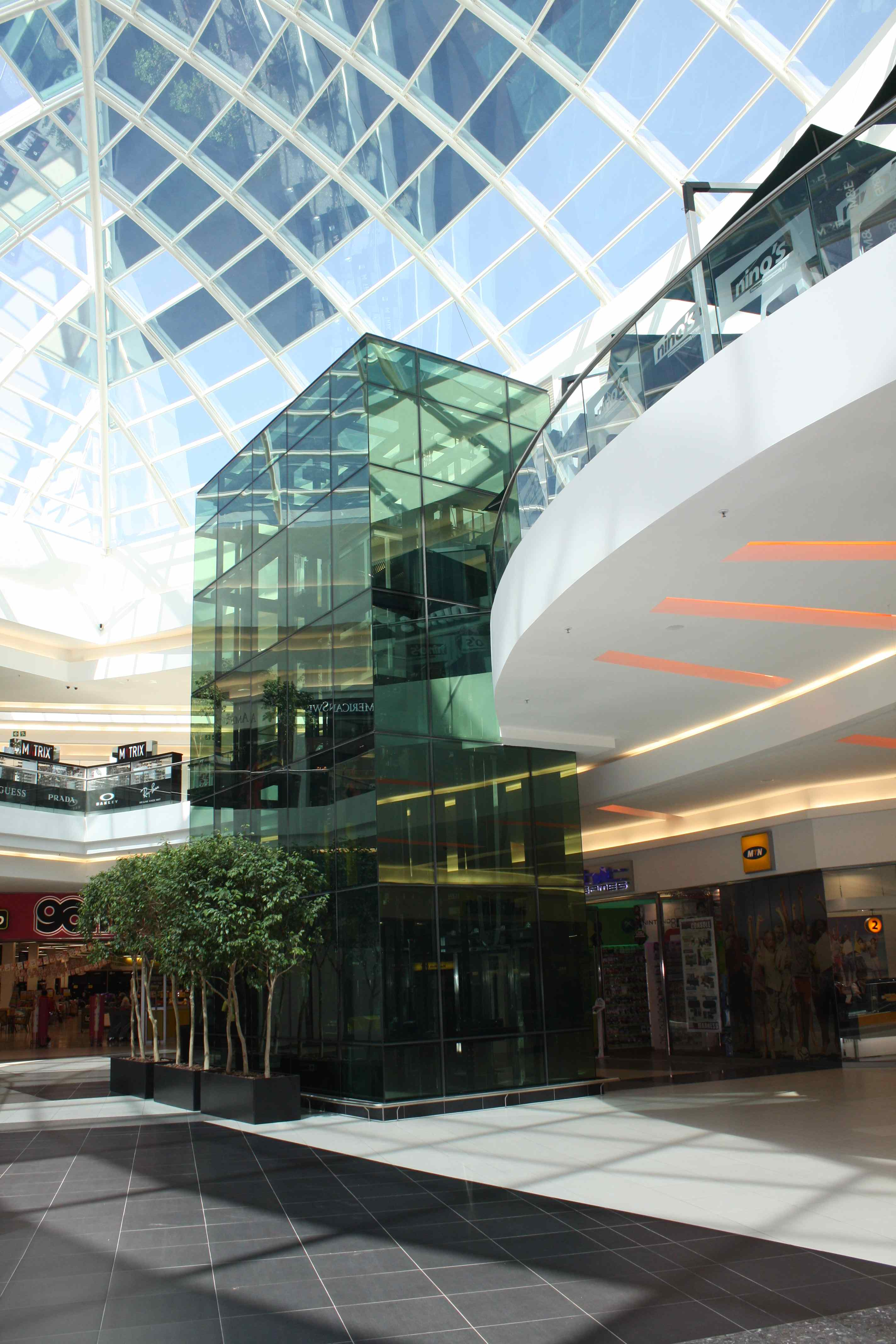
Wheelchair accommodation

== See also ==
- List of shopping malls in South Africa
