= Winnie Khumalo =

South African Afropop singer (1973–2025)

- Born: Winnifred Khumalo; 20 July 1973; Soweto, South Africa
- Died: 7 January 2025 (aged 51) Soweto, South Africa
- Genres: Kwaito, Afropop
- Occupations: Singer; songwriter; producer; actress; businesswoman
- Instrument: Vocals
- Labels: Kalawa Jazmee Records; WinnKay Music Records

Winnifred Khumalo (20 July 1973 – 7 January 2025) was a South African Kwaito and Afropop singer, actor and television personality. She was known as one of the country's most prolific musical artists and for her collaborations with other South African artists including Brenda Fassie. She was the mother of Rethabile Khumalo, who would follow her mother into a successful career in the South African music industry.

== Life and career ==
Khumalo was born on 20 July 1973 in Soweto. She was raised by her grandmother, attending Mncube Senior Secondary School. She began her musical career at age 13 in the 1980s, and would appear regularly on South African television. Khumalo released her first album, Hey Laaitie at age 15. Early in her career she collaborated with some of South Africa's biggest musical stars, including Brenda Fassie, Sello Chicco Twala, Brothers of Peace, Bongo Maffin and DJ Cleo. In addition to her musical career, Khumalo appeared in the SABC television series 'Muvhango' and 'Mponeng'.

After taking some time away from her career to raise her children, Khumalo returned to the music industry. In 2008, she released her most successful album, I Just Wanna Live My Life with Kalawa Jazmee Records. The album was certified gold. "Live My Life", the album's title track would become a staple of South African house music.

In 2010, Khumalo was diagnosed with ulcers after falling during a performance. In 2013, she spent over a month in the hospital recovering from recurring ulcers, putting her career on hold. She would continue to be plagued with several health conditions for the rest of her life, including repeating stomach ulcers, chest pains and fainting spells. Khumalo continued her prolific output, releasing Woman and Higher and Higher in 2013.

In 2014, Khumalo left Kawala Records, after spending most of her career with the company. Khumalo later developed her own record company, WinnKay Music Records & Management, and returned to releasing music. Khumalo was a vocal advocate for progress in the South African music industry, advocating for improvements to the climate for performing artists. She regularly called for greater innovation in the music scene, as well as for more government support, and unity amongst female artists.

In 2019, she released iXesha, translated as "time" in the Xhosa language. The album marked 31 years in the music industry. She continued to produce music despite her worsening health, releasing Intliziyo EP and Noluthando in 2021.

=== Personal life and death ===
Khumalo had two children and lived in Protea Glen on the western limits of Soweto. She had her first child at age 19, a son named Thando Thobela with Dingaan Thobela, a former boxing champion known as “Rose of Soweto”. In 1996, Khumalo gave birth to her daughter Rethabile Khumalo. Rethabile Khumalo followed in her mother's footsteps becoming a singer-songwriter, known mononymously as Rethabile. Rethabile began singing and performing at age 6, serving as her mother's backing vocalist and dancer.

Khumalo died on 7 January 2025 on the way to the hospital after suffering from a short illness. She was 51. After her death, South Africa's Department of Sports, Arts and Culture released a statement, expressing in part, "Her untimely death marks a great loss for South Africa and the music industry."
