= Kalkspruit =

Kalkspruit Ga-Maraba
- Location within Limpopo Location within South Africa Location within Africa Location within Earth
- Coordinates: 23.783°S 29.164°E
- Country: South Africa
- Province: Limpopo
- District: Capricorn
- Municipality: Polokwane

Government
  - Councillor: Mathonzi (Kgosi Gadi Maraba)

Area
  - Total: 5.52 km^{2} (2.13 sq mi)

Population (2011)
  - Total: 6,012
  - Density: 1,090/km^{2} (2,820/sq mi)

Racial makeup (2011)
  - Black African: 99.5%
  - Coloured: 0%
  - Indian/Asian: 0%
  - White: 0%
  - Other: 0.2%

First languages (2011)
  - Northern Sotho: 53.5%
  - S. Ndebele: 45%
  - Tsonga: 1.5%
  - Zulu: 0%
  - Other: 2.7%
- Time zone: UTC+2 (SAST)
- PO box: 0705

Kalkspruit (also known as Ga-Maraba) is a large village in Ga-Mashashane in the Polokwane Local Municipality Capricorn District Municipality in the Limpopo province of South Africa. The village is located on the Matlala Road about 30km west of the city of Polokwane. Kalkspruit is also home to two famous South Africans. The late legendary Jazz singer Jonas Gwangwa and Winnie Serite, After completing her studies in 2000, she cut her teeth in television working for Isidingo, spending eight years on the scriptwriting team and who is also the creator of the soapie drama skeem saam.
