= Shandesh =

South African singer

- Born: Rakgoale Nelly Machete; 25 January 2004 (age 22); Ga-Modjadji, Mohlabaneng, Limpopo, South Africa
- Occupation: Singer
- Years active: 2018–present
- Musical career
- Origin: Solomondale, Limpopo
- Genre: Lekompo
- Instrument: Vocals
- Labels: Shandesh Music; Virgin Active

Rakgoale Nelly Machete (born 25 January 2004) is a South African singer professionally known as Shandesh. She gained recognition in 2018 after the release of her debut single "Lomolo". Her songs "Ga Mmapula" and "Sdudla or Slender" were certified gold and platinum, respectively, in South Africa.

== Early life ==
Born on 25 January 2004, in Ga-Modjadji, Mohlabaneng, in the Limpopo province of South Africa and raised in Solomondale, Limpopo, Rakgoale Nelly Machete is prominently known as Shandesh.

== Career ==
She started her musical journey in fourth grade when she joined her church and school choir. Talking to DRUM magazine, she said that she started recording music professionally when she was in the eighth grade in 2018, at the age of 14. Shandesh gained recognition following the release of her debut single "Lomolo" which scored her gigs in her hometown. She worked with the likes of King Monada and Shebeshxt.

In 2025, with the South African record producer Mvzzle, she released "Sdudla or Slender" which peaked at number 2 on the Official South African Charts (TOSAC). That same year, the pair went on to release "Di Chopper" which debuted at number 5 on TOSAC, "Ga Mmapula" peaked at number 32 on week 16. She received a commemorative plaque of her achievements stating that "Ga Mmapula" was certified gold and "Sdudla or Slender" was certified platinum in South Africa by the Recording Industry of South Africa.

Shandesh is also planning on launching the Rakgoale Foundation, an organisation to help underprivileged kids with food parcels, sanitary towels and school shoes.

== Awards and nominations ==
Awards and nominations received by Shandesh
Award	Year (Note: Indicates the year of ceremony. Each year is linked to the article about the awards held that year, wherever possible.)	Category	Recipient(s) or nominee(s)	Result	Ref.
Metro FM Music Awards	2026	Best New Artist	Shandesh	Nominated	
Metro FM Music Awards	2026	Song of the Year	"Sdudla or Slender" (with Mvzzle)	Nominated	
Metro FM Music Awards	2026	Best Female Artist	Shandesh	Won	
Metro FM Music Awards	2026	Best Lekompo	"Sdudla or Slender" (with Mvzzle)	Nominated	

== Discography ==
=== Extended plays ===
- Mphoentle (2022)
- Versatile (2024)
- For The Queens (2025)

=== Charted singles ===
==== As lead artist ====
List of singles as lead artist, with selected chart positions and certifications, showing year released and album name
Title	Year	Peak chart positions	Certifications	Album
Title	Year	SA	Certifications	Album
"Sdudla or Slender" (with Mvzzle)	2025	2	RiSA: Platinum	Non-album single
"Di Chopper" (with Mvzzle, featuring Abi wa Mampela and Naleboy Young King)	2025	5		Non-album single
"Ga Mmapula" (featuring Hitboss)	2025	32	RiSA: Gold	Non-album single
"Warning" (featuring Shebeshxt, King Salah and KayCherlow)	2025	14		Non-album single
"Mamenemene" (with DJ Janisto and King Salah)	2025	39		Non-album single
"Passport" (with Mvzzle)	2025	36		Non-album single
"Tshwara Tlhogo" (featuring Abi wa Mampela and Hitboss SA)	2025	57		Non-album single

==== As guest artist ====
List of singles as featured artist, with selected chart positions and certifications, showing year released and album name
Title	Year	Peak chart positions	Certifications	Album
Title	Year	SA	Certifications	Album
"Shapa Bell" (Naleboy Young King featuring Shandesh and King WaveMusiq)	2025	34		Non-album single
