= Westenburg =

Township in Polokwane

Westies
- City
- Westenburg
- Location within Limpopo Location within South Africa Location within Africa Location within Earth
- Coordinates: 23.906033°S 29.429565°E
- Country: South Africa
- Province: Limpopo
- District: Capricorn
- Municipality: Polokwane Municipality
- Main Place: Polokwane

Government
  - Executive Mayor: Thembi Nkadimeng (ANC)
  - Mayor: Cleshin Adonis

Area
  - Total: 1.32 km^{2} (0.51 sq mi)

Population (2011)
  - Total: 10,201
  - Density: 7,730/km^{2} (20,000/sq mi)
- Demonym: Skaapie

Racial makeup (2011)
  - Black African: 64.85%
  - Coloured: 32.99%
  - Indian/Asian: 0.58%
  - White: 0.33%
  - Other: 1.25%

First languages (2011)
  - Sepedi: 41.43%
  - Afrikaans: 29.47%
  - English: 13.23%
  - Xitsonga: 2.42%
  - Other: 13.45%
- Time zone: UTC+2 (SAST)
- Postal code (street): 0699
- PO box: 0700
- Area code: 015
- Bird: Northern royal albatross
- Flower: Blue squill
- Website: www.polokwane.gov.za

Westenburg (or simply Westies), is a pre-urban human settlement (and sub-area) situated in Polokwane under the Capricorn District Municipality in the Limpopo province of South Africa.
