= Umlilo =

2019 single by DJ Zinhle

Single by DJ Zinhle feat. Mvzzle & Rethabile Khumalo
- Language: isiZulu
- English title: Fire
- Released: 23 August 2019
- Recorded: 18 August 2019
- Genre: House; Dance
- Length: 3:57
- Label: Kalawa Jazmee; Universal Music South Africa
- Composer(s): Ntombezinhle Jiyane; Rethabile Khumalo
- Lyricist(s): Rethabile Khumalo
- Producer(s): Mvzzle

DJ Zinhle singles chronology
"Against The Grain" (2019)	"Umlilo" (2019)	"Go!" (2020)

Mvzzle singles chronology
"Blackmail (Afro Tech)" (2019)	"Umlilo" (2019)	"Uvalo" (2020)

Rethabile Khumalo singles chronology
"Umlilo" (2019)	"Ntyilo Ntyilo" (2020)

Music video
- "Umlilo" on YouTube

Music video
- "Umlilo 2.0" on YouTube

"Umlilo" is a single by a South African DJ professionally known as DJ Zinhle, released on 23 August 2019, the single features vocals from female singer Rethabile Khumalo with production from Mvzzle. Umlilo has been certified multi-platinum and within its first three months, it reached over 5.1 million streams.

== Background ==
When translated, “Umlilo” means fire, translated from isiZulu to English. In the jam, three artists are grateful for what God has done to them. He has opened their eyes and ears, and they can speak because of “God’s fire alone. It is also essential to point out that each of the three artists chose their lines well.

Mvzzle contacted renowned DJ and entrepreneur, DJ Zinhle with two beats, one of which is now the smash hit ‘Umlilo’ featuring Rethabile – who had earlier DM’d, DJ Zinhle on Instagram proposing a collaboration with her, one thing led to the other and single was produced. Zinhle, in an edition of Red Bull Live With, explained to Mo Flava about the exact meaning behind the hit song.

"There has been a big debate about 'Umlilo' because it's such a big club or party song and people don't know that its actually a sing that praises God. It talks about the wonders of God's love and it is based on Bible scriptures which is amazing", explained the DJ.

The single was released through Universal Music South Africa on behalf of Kalawa Jazmee.

== Composition and lyrics ==
"Umlilo" is a house track that has a touch of dance/electronic.

The song features an "upbeat tempo beat" with Rethabile's vocals quoting a Bible verse

== Critical reception ==
The female producer DJ Zinhle was accused of buying nominations for the song and she had to clap back to clarify the mistakes made by the media.

== Accolades ==
The hit-single went on to receive triple-platinum plaques, and nominated for Record Of The Year (fan-voted) at 26th South African Music Awards. The single won a NAMA (award).

Year	Award Ceremony	Prize	Recipient/Nominated work	Result	Ref.
2020	South African Music Awards	Record of the Year (fan-voted)	"Umlilo"	Nominated	
2021	South African Music Awards	Best Music Video of the Year	"Umlilo"	Nominated	

== Certifications ==
Region	Certification	Certified units/sales
South Africa (RISA)	3× Platinum	60,000^{‡}
^{‡} Sales+streaming figures based on certification alone.

== Music video ==
DJ Zinhle released a visuals teaser of her hit single on Wednesday of 6 November 2019; 5 years ago. The video depicts the female DJ alongside a couple of dancers, Rethabile singing on the microphone and Mvzzle behind the decks

The official full length music video was released on 14 November 2019; 5 years ago, via YouTube

In celebration of the song's success, DJ Zinhle released a second [Platinum] video for Umlilo in December and just a few months later, the video has reached over 3 million views on YouTube.
