= Protea Glen =

- Location within Gauteng Location within South Africa
- Coordinates: 26.2804°S 27.8204°E
- Country: South Africa
- Province: Gauteng
- Municipality: City of Johannesburg
- Main Place: Soweto

Area
  - Total: 13.12 km^{2} (5.07 sq mi)

Population (2011)
  - Total: 75,634
  - Density: 5,765/km^{2} (14,930/sq mi)

Racial makeup (2011)
  - Black African: 99.0%
  - Coloured: 0.6%
  - Indian/Asian: 0.2%
  - White: 0.1%
  - Other: 0.2%

First languages (2011)
  - Zulu: 34.3%
  - Sotho: 15.8%
  - Tswana: 10.7%
  - Tsonga: 10.2%
  - Other: 29.0%
- Time zone: UTC+2 (SAST)
- Postal code (street): 1818
- PO box: 1819
- Website: http://proteaglen.co.za/

Protea Glen is a township of the City of Johannesburg, Gauteng Province, South Africa, located north of Lenasia and west of Soweto. The suburb was developed in the 1990s for middle-class residents.

The first shopping mall in the town, Protea Glen Mall, opened in October 2012.
