= DJ Zinhle =

South African DJ and producer (born 1982)

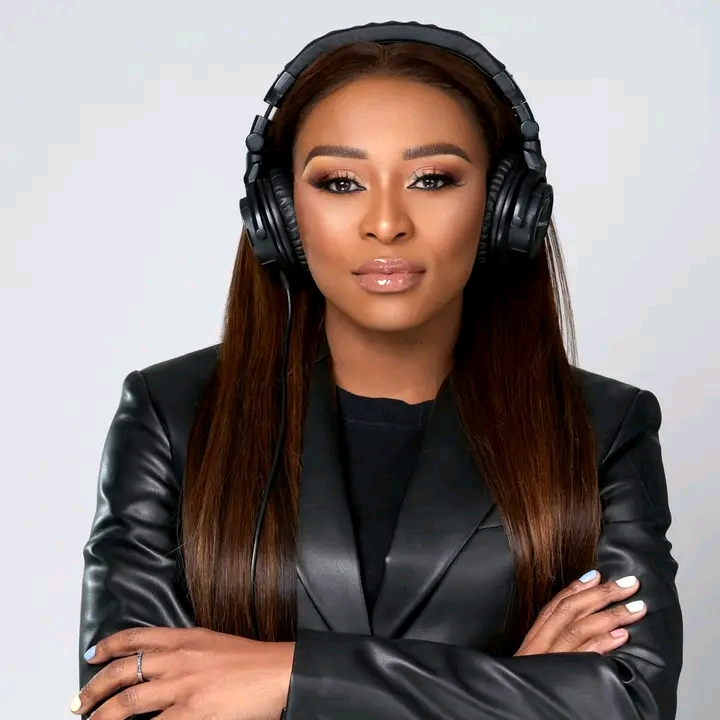
- Zinhle in 2023
- Born: Ntombezinhle Jiyane; 30 December 1982 (age 43); Dannhauser, KwaZulu-Natal, South Africa
- Other name: Her Majesty
- Education: University of Johannesburg
- Occupations: DJ; producer; media personality; businesswoman
- Years active: 2002–present
- Partners: AKA (sep. 2020); Murdah Bongz
- Children: 2
- Awards: Namibian Annual Music Award (Pan African Artist of the Year — 2020)
- Musical career
- Genres: House; dance/electronic
- Instruments: DAW; sampler
- Labels: Kalawa Jazmee; Universal Music South Africa
- Website: erabydjzinhle.com

Ntombezinhle Jiyane Mohosana (born 30 December 1982) known professionally as DJ Zinhle, is a South African DJ, producer, businesswoman, media personality. Zinhle has also pursued an acting career. She made her on-screen debut as judge in Jika MaJika, Idols South Africa, Turn It On, and 1's and 2's (2021) and appeared as a guest on the television series eKasi: Our Stories (2011), Play Your Part (2012), Tropika Island of Treasure (2012), The Close Up, Rhythm City, and her own show, DJ Zinhle The Unexpected.

== Early life ==
Ntombezinhle Jiyane was born in Dannhauser, KwaZulu-Natal. After leaving Dannhauser, she went to stay in Newcastle, and studied at Siyamukela High School in Emadadeni, Newcastle.

== Career ==
DJ Zinhle started her career around 2004. Initially, she wanted to be a TV presenter and never had any aspirations of being a DJ, until her brother's passion for mixing vinyls rubbed off on her and her love and passion for being a DJ grew. She got her first break as a resident DJ on a youth dance show called Jika Majika that aired on SABC 1.

She worked with South African music icon Boom Shaka on the album I Put It In, which featured other notable artists like Dr Malinga, Khanyi Mbau, Mphoza, and many more. She headlined the Sisters with Soul concert along with Amanda Black. At the second ceremony of Mzansi Kwaito and House Music Awards, she won two awards including; Best House DJ and Best House Female Artist. Zinhle also headlined the Zimfest 2019 live concert, a Zimbabwean festival held in England. Her 2019 hit single "Umlilo" gained 5.1 million streams in just three months, and certified 3× platinum by the Recording industry of South Africa (RISA) and it was also voted as 2019's Song of The Year. DJ Zinhle was chosen as the headline act for the inaugural Red Bull Music Experience in Cape Town.

"Siyabonga" with Kabza De Small, Nokwazi, Black Motion was released on November 26, 2021. The song debuted number 24 on both Local and International streaming charts.

In 2021, she co-hosted talent show competition on Sabc 1 called 1's and 2's alongside DJ Tira and DJ Speedsta. Towards the end of 2021, she announced Unexpected her reality show which premiered on BET Africa.

"Thula" by Zinhle and Cici was released on July 7, 2023. The song debuted number 3 in South Africa and charted number 1 on Metro FM Top 30 Countdown charts.

== Filmography ==
=== Television ===
Year	Title	Role	Notes
	Jika Majika	Herself	Resident DJ
2011	eKasi: Our Stories	Thuli	Supporting role
2011	Rhythm City	Faniswa	
	It's OK We're Family	Herself	
2012	Tropika Island	Herself	Judge
	Idols South Africa	Herself	Guest Judge
	Turn It Out	Herself	Guest Judge
2021	1's and 2's	Herself	Judge
2021	DJ Zinhle- The Unexpected	Herself	Main character

== Accolades ==
- SAMA 19 and 12th Metro FM Awards Song of the Year nominee.
- Named one of South Africa's Top 10 most influential women in Bona magazine.
- Named one of 21 most powerful African women by Oprah magazine.
- Channel 24 named her as the 4th most powerful celebrity in South Africa.
- Glamour magazine's Woman of the Year.
- Launched the women empowerment TV series It Takes a Village.
- In late 2019, she was named as the Top Female DJ in Africa for the 2nd year in a row.
- On 7 March 2020, she won the Forbes Woman Africa Entertainer Award.

== Awards and nominations ==
Year	Award Ceremony	Prize	Recipient/Nominated work	Result	Ref.
2019	Dance Music Awards South Africa	Best Female DJ	Herself	Nominated	
2020	South African Music Awards	Record of the Year (fan-voted)	"Umlilo"	Nominated	
2021	South African Music Awards	Best Music Video of the Year	"Umlilo"	Nominated	
2020	Namibian Annual Music Awards	Pan African Artist of the Year	Herself	Won	
2022	Global Music Awards Africa	DJ of the Year	Herself	Pending	
2024	Basadi in Music Awards	DJ of the Year	Herself	Won	
2024	Basadi in Music Awards	Collaboration of the Year	DJ Zinhle and Basetsana – "Mdali"	Won	
2024	Basadi in Music Awards	Collaboration of the Year	DJ Zinhle and Cici – "Thula"	Nominated	
2024	Basadi in Music Awards	Music Video of the Year	DJ Zinhle and Cici – "Thula"	Nominated	
2024	Basadi in Music Awards	Trailblazer Award	Herself	Won	
2024	African Entertainment Awards USA	Best DJ	Herself	Pending	

== Personal life ==
DJ Zinhle was in an on and off relationship with South African rapper AKA, until their final split in January 2020. She and AKA have one daughter together, Kairo Owethu Forbes, born in 2015 In 2021, she gave birth to another daughter with her husband Bongani, also known as Murdah Bongz.
