= Big Brother Mzansi season 6 =

Big Brother Mzansi
- Season 6
- Presented by: Smash Afrika
- No. of days: 71
- No. of housemates: 23
- Winner: Liema
- Runner-up: Thandeka

Release
- Original network: Mzansi Magic; Mzansi Wethu; DStv/GOtv (live)
- Original release: 11 January – 22 March 2026

Series chronology
- ← Previous; Season 5

Big Brother Mzansi: Bazozwa (also known as Big Brother Mzansi 6 or Big Brother South Africa 8) was the sixth season of the South African Big Brother reality television reboot series produced by Banijay and Red Pepper Pictures for M-Net and Mzansi Magic. It premiered on 11 January 2026 on DStv channel 198 and concluded on 22 March. The season was won by Liema Pantsi, while Thandeka Tshabalala was the runner-up.

LottoStar returned as the headline sponsor, while Chillers Punch and King Pie were the associate sponsors. Robertsons Spices, Zakhaa Pay, Schweppes, PepsiCo (Doritos and Simba), BayerSA (Berocca and Rennie), Falco Milano Eyewear, Galxboy and Unilever Homecare were the tactical sponsors.

Smash Afrika returned as the show's host.

== Housemates ==
On 11 January 2026, 23 housemates entered the house, including four former housemates from S'ya Mosha, Umlilo and Titans seasons. The pre-launch had the public voting for the four former housemates from a selection of seven.

Housemates	Age on entry	Occupation	Residence	Day entered	Day exited	Status
Liyema "Liema" Pantsi	24	Student, bartender, musician	King William's Town, Eastern Cape	0	70	Winner
Thandeka Tshabalala	30	Bookkeeper	Durban, KwaZulu-Natal	0	70	Runner-up
Lindokuhle "Bravo B" Nsele	28	Food vendor	Durban, KwaZulu-Natal	0	70	3rd place
Velile "Que" Nongogo	27	Corporate fleet analyst	Johannesburg	0	70	4th place
Didintle "Didi" Mothobi	21	Student	Lenesia, Gauteng	0	70	5th place
Lindy "Trixie" Christoffels	35	Club promoter	Gauteng	0	70	6th place
Mmeli Khumalo	27	Content creator, model	Hillbrow, Gauteng	0	63	Evicted
Ashay Sewlall	23	Personal trainer, content creator	Richards Bay, KwaZulu-Natal	0	63	Evicted
Sihle "The Don" Sishi	24	Model, content creator	Diepkloof, Gauteng	0	56	Evicted
Wanda "King Wanda" Gumede	31	Municipality employee	Delmas, Mpumalanga	0	56	Evicted
Langelihle "Ilano" Gumede	23	Make-up artist, hair stylist	Inanda, KwaZulu-Natal	0	49	Evicted
Tumi "Tumi the Barber" Mohwaduba	23	Barber, dancer	Kwaggafontein, Mpumalanga	0	42	Evicted
Ramona Maloy	37	Unemployed	Montagu, Western Cape	0	42	Evicted
Neliswa Ngada	30	Club entertainment manager	Johannesburg	0	35	Ejected
Mpendulo Dube	22	Telesales agent	Johannesburg, Gauteng	0	35	Evicted
Buhle "Buhle B" Makhanya	22	Graduate	Boksburg, Gauteng	0	28	Evicted
Philani "Kokii" Beauzana	26	Unemployed	Carltonville, Gauteng	0	28	Evicted
Nkululeko "Mshefane" Masiye	27	Content creator	Witbank, Gauteng	0	28	Evicted
Dene Jones	29	Legal officer, content creator, student	Eldorado Park, Gauteng	0	21	Evicted
Mashél Mokale	31	Unemployed	Rustenburg, North West	0	21	Evicted
Ofentse Modise	26	Model	Mamelodi, Gauteng	0	14	Evicted
Lawrence "Lawredo" Modise	32	Model, entrepreneur	Mahikeng, North West	0	14	Evicted
Marcia "Cia" Morata	30	Unemployed	Mamelodi, Gauteng	0	4	Walked

The launch night (11 January) is marked as Day 0. The day after is Day 1.

=== Pairs ===
Week 2
#	Housemates
1	Ashay & Mashél
2	Buhle B & Dene Jones
3	Bravo B & Kokii
4	Dube & Mmeli
5	Didi & Que
6	Ilano & Ramona
7	King Wanda & Thandeka
8	Liema & Tumi the Barber
9	Lawredo & Mshefane
10	Neliswa & The Don
11	Ofentse & Trixie

=== Pre-launch redemption vote ===
Former housemates	Season	Status
Bravo B	S'ya Mosha	Qualified; 28.11%
Dube	Umlilo	Qualified; 24.92%
Fahima	S'ya Mosha	Did not qualify 2.52%
Lerato Modise	S'ya Mosha	Did not qualify 4.92%
Liema	S'ya Mosha	Qualified; 17.25%
Mmeli	Big Brother Titans	Qualified; 17.10%
Sipha Lee	Umlilo	Did not qualify 5.82%

== Voting history and Nominations ==
	Individuals	Pairs	Individuals									Nominations & votes received
	Week 1	Week 2	Week 3	Week 4	Week 5	Week 6	Week 7	Week 8	Week 9	Week 10 Final		Nominations & votes received
Head of House	Ofentse	Dube	Tumi the Barber	Tumi the Barber	Mmeli	King Wanda	Ashay	Ashay	Ashay	Que		Nominations & votes received
Liema	Thandeka; Tumi the Barber	Immunity Vote	Mashél; Ilano	Mshefane; Mmeli	No Voting	Thandeka; Tumi the Barber	Que; Thandeka	Thandeka; Mmeli	Bravo B Mmeli	Winner (Day 70)		15
Thandeka	Didi; Que	Immunity Vote	Didi; Dene Jones	Trixie; Didi	No Voting	Liema; Didi	Trixie; Didi	Trixie; Didi; Liema	Liema; Didi	Runner-up (Day 70)		39
Bravo B	The Don; Que	Immunity Vote	Que; Mashél	Self	No Voting	Tumi the Barber; Ramona	Que; Ilano	King Wanda; The Don	Mmeli; Liema	3rd place (Day 70)		6
Que	Thandeka; Ramona	Immunity Vote	King Wanda; Ramona	Dube; Kokii	No Voting	The Don; Didi	King Wanda; Bravo B	Bravo B The Don	Ashay; Bravo B	4th place (Day 70)		26
Didi	Thandeka; Cia	Immunity Vote	Thandeka; Mmeli	Thandeka; Kokii	No Voting	Thandeka; Que	Thandeka; Mmeli	Thandeka; Mmeli	Mmeli; Que	5th place (Day 70)		18
Trixie	Thandeka; Buhle B	Immunity Vote	Thandeka; Mashél	Buhle B Thandeka	No Voting	Thandeka; Que	Thandeka; Que	Thandeka; Mmeli	Mmeli; Ashay	6th place (Day 70)		9
Mmeli	Que; Cia	Immunity Vote	Dene Jones; Que	King Wanda; Trixie	No Voting	Ramona; The Don	King Wanda; Liema	The Don; Liema	Liema; Didi	Evicted (Day 63)		22
Ashay	Thandeka; Kokii	Immunity Vote	Que; Ilano	Self	No Voting	Que; Mmeli	Que; Mmeli	Que; Mmeli	Que; Mmeli	Evicted (Day 63)		2
The Don	Que; Thandeka	Immunity Vote	Que; Didi	Didi; Que	No Voting	Que; Ramona	Que; Thandeka	Thandeka; Mmeli	Evicted (Day 56)			3
King Wanda	Kokii; Didi	Immunity Vote	Mashél; Que	Buhle B Trixie	No Voting	Ramona; Mmeli	Que; Mmeli	Thandeka; Mmeli	Evicted (Day 56)			10
Ilano	Thandeka; Kokii	Immunity Vote	Mshefane; Thandeka	Mshefane; Thandeka	No Voting	Thandeka; Trixie	Thandeka; King Wanda	Evicted (Day 49)				4
Tumi the Barber	Thandeka; Bravo B	Immunity Vote	Didi; Mashél	Kokii; Liema	No Voting	Mmeli; Liema	Evicted (Day 42)					4
Ramona	The Don; Tumi the Barber	Immunity Vote	King Wanda; Thandeka	King Wanda; Didi	No Voting	Liema; Thandeka	Evicted (Day 42)					8
Neliswa	Thandeka; Buhle B	Immunity Vote	Thandeka; Que	Thandeka; Didi	No Voting	Ejected (Day 35)						0
Dube	Thandeka; King Wanda	Immunity Vote	Didi; Mashél	Didi; Que	No Voting	Evicted (Day 35)						1
Buhle B	Liema; Thandeka	Immunity Vote	Liema; Dene Jones	King Wanda; Liema	Evicted (Day 28)							7
Kokii	Buhle B Thandeka	Immunity Vote	Didi; Mashél	Didi; Buhle B	Evicted (Day 28)							6
Mshefane	Que; Thandeka	Immunity Vote	Que; Dene Jones	Ilano; Liema	Evicted (Day 28)							3
Dene Jones	Buhle B Thandeka	Immunity Vote	Thandeka; Mmeli	Evicted (Day 21)								4
Mashél	Thandeka; Ramona	Immunity Vote	Liema; Thandeka	Evicted (Day 21)								7
Ofentse	Mmeli; Ashay	Immunity Vote	Evicted (Day 14)									0
Lawredo	The Don; Ramona	Immunity Vote	Evicted (Day 14)									0
Cia	Bravo B Mmeli	Walked (Day 4)										2
Note	1	2, 3	4	5	6, 7	none	8	9	10	none		
Nominated (pre-save and replace)	Fake Nominations	Lawredo; Neliswa; Ofentse; Que; The Don; Tumi the Barber	Dene Jones; Didi; Ilano; King Wanda; Liema; Mashél; Mmeli; Que; Ramona; Thandeka	Ashay; Bravo B Buhle B Didi; King Wanda; Kokii; Liema; Mshefane; Que; Thandeka; Trixie	Ashay; Bravo B Didi; Dube; Ilano; King Wanda; Liema; Neliswa; Que; Ramona; Thandeka; The Don; Trixie; Tumi the Barber	Didi; Liema; Mmeli; Que; Ramona; Thandeka; The Don; Trixie; Tumi the Barber	Bravo B Didi; Ilano; King Wanda; Liema; Mmeli; Que; Thandeka; Trixie	Bravo B Didi; King Wanda; Liema; Mmeli; Que; The Don; Thandeka; Trixie	Ashay; Bravo B Didi; Liema; Mmeli; Que	Bravo B Didi; Liema; Que; Thandeka; Trixie		
Saved	Fake Nominations	none							Liema	none		
Against public vote	No Voting	Lawredo; Neliswa; Ofentse; Que; The Don; Tumi the Barber	Dene Jones; Didi; Ilano; King Wanda; Liema; Mashél; Mmeli; Que; Ramona; Thandeka	Ashay; Bravo B Buhle B Didi; King Wanda; Kokii; Liema; Mshefane; Que; Thandeka; Trixie	Ashay; Bravo B Didi; Dube; Ilano; King Wanda; Liema; Neliswa; Que; Ramona; Thandeka; The Don; Trixie; Tumi the Barber	Didi; Liema; Mmeli; Que; Ramona; Thandeka; The Don; Trixie; Tumi the Barber	Bravo B Didi; Ilano; King Wanda; Liema; Mmeli; Que; Thandeka; Trixie	Bravo B Didi; King Wanda; Liema; Mmeli; Que; The Don; Thandeka; Trixie	Ashay; Bravo B Didi; Mmeli; Que	Bravo B Didi; Liema; Que; Thandeka; Trixie		
Ejected	none	none			Neliswa	none						
Walked	Cia	none			none	none						
Evicted	No Evictions	Lawredo; 7.07% to save	Mashél; 1.68% to save	Mshefane; 2.47% to save	Dube; 1.18% to save	Ramona; 2.07% to save	Ilano; 5.93% to save	King Wanda; 4.05% to save	Ashay; 15.83% to save	Trixie; 3.11% to win	Didi; 4.69% to win	
Evicted	No Evictions	Ofentse; 11.65% to save	Dene Jones; 3.49% to save	Kokii; 4.46% to save	Dube; 1.18% to save	Tumi the Barber; 6.46% to save	Ilano; 5.93% to save	The Don; 4.00% to save	Mmeli; 18.02% to save	Que; 13.5% to win	Bravo B 14.9% to win	
Evicted	No Evictions	Ofentse; 11.65% to save	Dene Jones; 3.49% to save	Buhle B 4.56% to save	Dube; 1.18% to save	Tumi the Barber; 6.46% to save	Ilano; 5.93% to save	The Don; 4.00% to save	Mmeli; 18.02% to save	Thandeka; 29.97% to win		
Survived	No Evictions	The Don; 15.44% to save Que; 18.41% to save Tumi the barber 19.00% to save Neliswa; 28.44% to save	Ilano; 3.92% to save King Wanda; 7.01% to save Ramona; 7.93% to save Mmeli; 11.46% to save Que; 11.78% to save Didi; 12.67% to save Liema; 19.46% to save Thandeka; 20.59% to save	King Wanda; 4.87% to save Que; 7.35% to save Didi; 9.10% to save Trixie; 9.20% to save Bravo B 10.02% to save Liema; 14.19% to save Ashay; 15.30% to save Thandeka; 18.49% to save	Ramona; 1.95% to save The Don; 2.63% to save ~~Neliswa~~; ~~3.73%~~; ~~to save~~ Ilano; 4.01% to save Que; 5.44% to save Tumi The Barber; 5.60% to save King Wanda; 6.58% to save Trixie; 7.59% to save Didi; 8.20% to save Bravo B 9.23% to save Ashay; 10.92% to save Liema; 14.52% to save Thandeka; 18.42% to save	The Don; 7.42% to save Didi; 7.94% to save Mmeli; 9.17% to save Trixie; 13.55% to save Que; 17.35% to save Thandeka; 17.99% to save Liema; 18.05% to save	King Wanda; 7.23% to save Didi; 7.80% to save Bravo B 9.61% to save Mmeli; 9.74% to save Trixie; 10.64% to save Liema; 15.73% to save Que; 16.50% to save Thandeka; 16.82% to save	Bravo B 9.90% to save Mmeli; 10.33% to save Trixie; 10.52% to save Didi; 11.14% to save Que; 16.04% to save Liema; 16.04% to save Thandeka; 17.99% to save	Didi; 21.08% to save Bravo B 21.69% to save Que; 23.39% to save	Liema; 33.84% to win		

=== Notes ===
- ^Note 1: In Week 1, Cia left the Big Brother house due to health concerns.
- ^Note 2: In Week 2, Big Brother introduced housemate pairs. Each pair had to select any two individual housemates that they wanted to save from nomination. The housemates with the fewest votes were up for eviction.
- ^Note 3: In Week 2, during the eviction show, Big Brother introduced the Untouchables Pick, where the outgoing HoH selects two housemates they would like to keep safe from the coming week's nomination. HoH Dube selected Kokii and Bravo B.
- ^Note 4: In Week 3, the HoH would have Supreme HoH power. This meant that their chosen guest would be immune from nomination that week and had to add a Killer Nomination to the nomination list. HoH Tumi selected Buhle B as his guest and nominated Ramona.
- ^Note 5: In Week 4, nominations were face-to-face.
- ^Note 6: In Week 5, Big Brother introduced a nomination wheel. Only the HoH could spin it to determine the fate of the housemates that week. HoH Mmeli spun it, and it landed on every housemate being up for eviction.
- ^Note 7: In Week 5, Neliswa was disqualified from the show after physically attacking Que during a heated argument.
- ^Note 8: In Week 7, Big Brother reintroduced the Untouchables Pick. HoH Ashay chose The Don to be safe from nomination.
- ^Note 9: In Week 8, Thandeka could nominate an extra housemate for possible eviction after completing her secret mission the previous week.
- ^Note 10: In Week 9, Big Brother introduced the redemption wheel, where the HoH would spin it and save one of the nominated housemates from the nomination list.

== Nomination table ==
Weeks	Nominated	Evicted
Week 1	Fake Nominations	Cia (Walked)
Week 2	Lawredo, Neliswa, Ofentse, Que, The Don & Tumi the Barber	Lawredo & Ofentse
Week 3	Dene Jones, Didi, Ilano, King Wanda, Liema, Mashél, Mmeli, Que, Ramona & Thandeka	Dene Jones & Mashél
Week 4	Ashay, Bravo B, Buhle B, Didi, King Wanda, Kokii, Liema, Mshefane, Que, Thandeka & Trixie	Buhle B, Kokii & Mshefane
Week 5	Ashay, Bravo B, Didi, Dube, Ilano, King Wanda, Liema, Neliswa, Que, Ramona, Thandeka, The Don, Trixie & Tumi the Barber	Dube & Neliswa (Ejected)
Week 6	Didi, Liema, Mmeli, Que, Ramona, Thandeka, The Don, Trixie & Tumi the Barber	Ramona & Tumi the Barber
Week 7	Bravo B, Didi, Ilano, King Wanda, Liema, Mmeli, Que, Thandeka & Trixie	Ilano
Week 8	Bravo B, Didi, King Wanda, Liema, Mmeli, Que, Thandeka & Trixie	King Wanda & The Don
Week 9	Ashay, Bravo B, Didi, Mmeli & Que	Ashay & Mmeli
Week 10	Bravo B, Didi, Liema, Que, Thandeka & Trixie	Bravo B, Didi, Que, Thandeka & Trixie
