= Bells and whistles =

Bells and whistles refers to non-essential features, visual or functional, that are an enhancement to an object.

It may also refer to:

- More Bells and Whistles, a 1990 computer animation created by Wayne Lytle
- Detana!! TwinBee, a 1991 coin-operated video game produced by Konami (released outside Japan as Bells & Whistles)
- "Bells and Whistles", a song by Andrew Jackson Jihad from the 2007 album People That Can Eat People Are the Luckiest People in the World
- "The Bells and Whistles", an episode of American TV series Smash
- "Bells N Whistles", 2024 studio album by Liema Pantsi
