= Ilano =

South African television personality (born 2002)

- Ilano in 2026
- Born: 22 October 2002 (age 24); Durban, KwaZulu Natal, South Africa
- Other names: Langelihle Gumede; Ilanó Sky
- Occupations: Makeup artist; activist
- Years active: 2025–present

Langelihle Gumede (born 22 October 2002) known mononymously as Ilano or Ilanó Sky, is a South African makeup artist, activist and television personality. She is best known as the first openly transgender in Big Brother Mzansi history and she gained prominence as a housemate of Big Brother Mzansi season 6.

== Early life ==
Gumede was born on 2002, in Durban, KwaZulu Natal, South Africa. She grew up with her twin brother where they both attended the same school and she has shared that their relationship was strained during their youth. Her family treated her as a girl and used to wear girl's clothes when she was growing up.

== Career ==
Gumede started her journey as a makeup artist when she was in Grade 8, developing a talent for beating faces and styling hair long before her public debut. She established herself as a hairstylist and makeup artist, specifically known for wig installations. Her career reached a new level when she joined Big Brother Mzansi season 6 as the first openly transgender housemate in the history. She used the platform as a live portfolio and showcasing her makeup and styling skills to a national audience daily. On the 49th, she was the 11th housemate to be evicted from the house.

== Personal life ==
Gumede is an openly trans woman. She uses she/her pronouns.

== Controversy ==
During her time on Big Brother Mzansi season 6, Gumede was involved in a controversy after several housemates made transphobic remarks about her. The comments drew widespread criticism from viewers and sparked discussions about representation and respect for LGBTQ+ individuals on reality television. In response, the production issued strikes to the housemates responsible, including Thandeka and Ramona, and some family members publicly apologized for their remarks.

== Filmography ==
Year	Title	Role	Notes
2026	Big Brother Mzansi season 6	Contestant	Evicted, week 7
