= Ashay Sewlall =

South African television personality (born 2001)

- Born: Ashay Sewlall; 5 February 2001 (age 25); Richards Bay, KwaZulu Natal, South Africa
- Other name: Paprika
- Occupations: Footballer; content creator; television personality
- Years active: 2020–present
Association football career
- Height: 1.85 m (6 ft 1 in)
- Position: Defender
Senior career*
Years	Team	Apps	(Gls)
2020–2024	Richards Bay	25	(2)
- * Club domestic league appearances and goals

Ashay Sewlall (born 5 February 2001) is a South African influencer, television personality and former professional footballer who played as a defender for Richards Bay. He was a housemate on Big Brother Mzansi season 6.

== Career ==
=== 2020–2025: Club career ===
Sewlall began his professional football career in 2020 when he was primarily playing for Richards Bay when he signed his first professional contract at age 18 and eventually captained the club's U23 team in the Diski Challenge. He helped the club win the National First Division for 2021–22. He was part of the squad that earned promotion to the Premier Soccer League and won the SALGA Games. In June 2025, he transitioned to long distance running by completing the Comrades Marathon, a 89 km down run from Pietermaritzburg to Durban.

=== 2026–present: Big Brother Mzansi season 6 ===
In January 2026, Sewlall entered the Big Brother Mzansi season 6 (Bazozwa) making history as the first Indian contestant in history of Big Brother Mzansi. He quickly established himself as a fan favorite, earning the nickname "Paprika" for his energetic personality and spicy vibes. He brang creative in the house as he was declared as the winner of Chillers Punch challenge with "Pele Pele" design. He celebrated his birthday where he won the Berocca's task with R3 000 cheque. He became the first and the only contestant to win the Head of the House challenge in Big Brother Mzansi history. He got evicted with Mmeli before the last week of the finale.

In April 2026, Sewlall won the Africa Golden Awards for Top African Reality TV Personality. He was named the GAC Motor ambassador. He joined an attempt to break the Guinness World Record along DJ Tira, DJ Kent and DJ Jashmir for the largest bhangra dance. In August, he joined the Gagasi FM as a host. In September, he was announced that he will participate as a contestant in the Tropika Island of Treasure season 12. He was paired with Wiseman Mncube. In November, he was named South Africa's 10 Most Impactful Mobility Brand Influencer 2026.

== Public image ==
Sewlall is defined by his reputation as a charismatic and made history as the first Indian housemate on Big Brother Mzansi season 6. He is referred as "Paprika", this persona further reinforced by his dominant efforts and his transition into a digital content creator, earning him a nomination for Top African Reality TV Personality at the 11th Africa Golden Awards while he was still in the house.

== Filmography ==
Year	Title	Role	Notes
2026	Big Brother Mzansi season 6	Contestant	Evicted, 9th week

== Awards and nominations ==
Year	Association	Category	Nominated works	Result	Ref.
2026	Africa Golden Awards	Top African Reality TV Personality	Himself	Won	

== Honours ==
Richards Bay

- National First Division: 2021–22
