= Big Brother Mzansi =

Television series in South Africa produced by Endemol

- Big Brother Mzansi; Big Brother South Africa
- Country of origin: South Africa
- Original language: English
- No. of seasons: 8

Production
- Producers: Banijay Entertainment (Note: Known as Endemol from seasons 1–3. Also known as Endemol Shine Group for season 4.); Mzansi Magic

Original release
- Network: M-Net (Note: From season 1–2, as well as the celebrity season.); Mzansi Magic (Note: From season 3 onwards.); DStv (Note: 24-hour feeds on channel 37 for seasons 1–2 and channel 198 since season 3.)
- Release: 26 August 2001 – present

Big Brother Mzansi, formerly known as Big Brother South Africa, is a television series in South Africa produced by M-Net and Banijay Entertainment. As of 2026, both shows have a total of eight seasons. Big Brother South Africa had two seasons, and a celebrity season in between. The first season aired in 2001 and the second in 2002. The seasons were directed by Leon Coetzer and hosted by Mark Pilgrim.

In 2014, the show was rebooted and rebranded Big Brother Mzansi. This return show brought with it a new host, Lungile Radu, and a new production network, M-Net's Mzansi Magic. The second season was broadcast in 2015.

Following a six-year hiatus, a third season of Big Brother Mzansi was announced, which premiered on 23 January 2022 with a new host, Lawrence Maleka.

In October 2022, a special edition in the Big Brother Africa franchise combining Big Brother Mzansi and Big Brother Naija called Big Brother Titans, where South Africa will face off against Nigeria, was announced, premiering on 15 January 2023.

In 2025, Smash Afrika replaced Lawrence Maleka for the fifth season of Big Brother Mzansi.

== Series overview ==
Season	Subtitle	Launch date	Finale date	Days	Housemates	Winner	Runner-up	Main presenters	Network
Big Brother South Africa season 1	None	26 August 2001	09 December 2001	106	12	Ferdinand Rabie	Vuyo	Mark Pilgrim Gerry Rantseli	DStv; M-Net
Celebrity Big Brother	None	23 June 2002	30 June 2002	7	10	Bill Flynn	Jo-Ann Strauss	Mark Pilgrim Gerry Rantseli	DStv; M-Net
Big Brother South Africa season 2	None	28 July 2002	13 October 2002	79	13	Richard Cawood	Jacqui	Mark Pilgrim Gerry Rantseli	DStv; M-Net
Big Brother Mzansi 1	Secrets	02 February 2014	06 April 2014	63	18	Mandla Hlatshwayo	Iris	Lungile Radu	Mzansi Magic; DStv
Big Brother Mzansi 2	Double Trouble	22 March 2015	18 May 2015	56	20	Ace Khumalo & Ntombi Tshabalala	K2 Mabusela & Blue Mbombo	Lungile Radu	Mzansi Magic; DStv
Big Brother Mzansi 3	Beke Le Beke	23 January 2022	03 April 2022	70	20	Michelle Dimpho "Mphowabadimo" Mvundla	Gashwen Brandon "Gash1" Mthombeni	Lawrence Maleka	Mzansi Magic; DStv
Big Brother Mzansi 4	S'ya Mosha	21 January 2024	31 March 2024	70	23	Siphephelo "McJunior" Zondi	Tshepo "Makhekhe" Tau	Lawrence Maleka	Mzansi Magic; DStv
Big Brother Mzansi 5	Umlilo	12 January 2025	23 March 2025	70	24	Akhonamathemba "Sweet Guluva" Zwane	Uyanda Hlangabezo	Smash Afrika	Mzansi Magic; Mzansi Wethu; DStv
Big Brother Mzansi 6	Bazozwa	11 January 2026	22 March 2026	70	23	Liema Pantsi	Thandeka Tshabalala	Smash Afrika	Mzansi Magic; Mzansi Wethu; DStv

== Big Brother South Africa ==
=== Season 1 ===
Start Date: 26 August 2001
End Date: 9 December 2001
Duration: 106 days

Nominations Table

	Week 2	Week 4	Week 6	Week 8	Week 10	Week 12	Week 13	Week 14	Week 15 Final		Nominations received
Ferdi	Steven, Riaad	Steven, Lara	Steven, Margaret	Vuyo, Janine	Steven, Margaret	Leigh, Margaret	Riaad, Vuyo	Riaad, Vuyo	Winner (Day 106)		24
Vuyo	Margaret, Steven	Brad, Ferdi	Riaad, Margaret	Ferdi, Leigh	Nobesuthu, Margaret	Leigh, Margaret	Ferdi, Leigh	Riaad, Irvan	Runner-up (Day 106)		6
Nobesuthu	Lara, Steven	Lara, Steven	Brad, Irvan	Leigh, Ferdi	Ferdi, Leigh	Leigh, Riaad	Ferdi, Vuyo	Irvan, Riaad	Third place (Day 106)		10
Riaad	Brad, Nina	Brad, Ferdi	Brad, Ferdi	Ferdi, Janine	Margaret, Steven	Ferdi, Margaret	Ferdi, Vuyo	Ferdi, Nobesuthu	Fourth place (Day 106)		9
Irvan	Nina, Riaad	Lara, Steven	Margaret, Leigh	Steven, Margaret	Steven, Margaret	Leigh, Margaret	Ferdi, Leigh	Nobesuthu, Ferdi	Evicted (Day 99)		7
Leigh	Nina, Margaret	Margaret, Nobesuthu	Margaret, Nobesuthu	Janine, Nobesuthu	Margaret, Steven	Margaret, Nobesuthu	Nobesuthu, Ferdi	Evicted (Day 92)			13
Margaret	Brad, Nobesuthu	Nobesuthu, Steven	Ferdi, Brad	Ferdi, Irvan	Ferdi, Leigh	Leigh, Ferdi	Evicted (Day 85)				20
Steven	Brad, Nina	Brad, Ferdi	Ferdi, Brad	Ferdi, Irvan	Ferdi, Irvan	Evicted (Day 71)					15
Janine	Brad, Nina	Lara, Leigh	Brad, Vuyo	Ferdi, Irvan	Evicted (Day 57)						3
Brad	Nina, Lara	Lara, Steven	Steven, Margaret	Evicted (Day 43)							15
Lara	Brad, Nina	Brad, Margaret	Evicted (Day 29)								7
Nina	Brad, Riaad	Evicted (Day 15)									7
Against public vote	Brad, Nina	Lara, Steven	Brad, Margaret	Ferdi, Irvan, Janine	Ferdi, Margaret, Steven	Leigh, Margaret	Ferdi, Leigh	Ferdi, Irvan, Nobesuthu, Riaad	Ferdi, Nobesuthu, Riaad, Vuyo		
Evicted	Nina; 76% to evict	Lara; 90.58% to evict	Brad; 51.34% to evict	Janine; 88.45% to evict	Steven; 60.87% to evict	Margaret; 63.85% to evict	Leigh; 80.58% to evict	Irvan; 53.89% to evict	Riaad; 1.22% to win	Nobesuthu; 1.87% to win	
Evicted	Nina; 76% to evict	Lara; 90.58% to evict	Brad; 51.34% to evict	Janine; 88.45% to evict	Steven; 60.87% to evict	Margaret; 63.85% to evict	Leigh; 80.58% to evict	Irvan; 53.89% to evict	Vuyo; 6.86% to win		
Survived	Brad; 24%	Steven; 9.42%	Margaret; 48.66%	Irvan; 8.47% Ferdi; 3.08%	Margaret; 30.04% Ferdi; 9.10%	Leigh; 36.15%	Ferdi; 19.42%	Riaad; 27.47% Nobesuthu; 15.07% Ferdi; 3.57%	Ferdi; 90.04% to win		

- Lynne McCarthy, pulled out of first season days before recording to pursue international modeling contract. McCarthy returned to South Africa a few years later to star in local soaps EGOLI and Isidingo.

=== Celebrity season ===
Start Date: 23 June 2002
End Date: 30 June 2002
Duration: 8 days

The Finalists: 4 - Bill (The Winner), Jo-Ann (Runner-up), Bad Boy (3rd) & Danny (4th)
Evicted Housemates: 5 - Gloria, Helen, Kabelo, Neil & TK
Voluntary Exits: 2 - Sam & Emmanuel

=== Season 2 ===
Start Date: 28 July 2002
End Date: 13 October 2002
Duration: 79 days

Nominations table

	Week 1	Week 2	Week 3	Week 4	Week 5	Week 6	Week 7	Week 8	Week 9	Week 10 Final	
Richard	Dominique; Thando	Mandy; Thando	Groschaan; Thando	Carol; Jacqui	Ilse-Marie; Rabin	Andre; Ilse-Marie	Andre; Rabin	Lee Ann nkosi	Andre	Winner (Day 79)	
Jacqui	Not in House	Puledi; Richard	Puledi; Richard	Richard; Zlatko	Mandy; Rabin	Rabin; Richard	Mandy; Rabin	Mandy; Richard	Richard	Runner up (Day 79)	
Puledi	Not in House	Groschaan; Zlatko	Groschaan; Zlatko	Carol; Zlatko	Ilse-Marie; Zlatko	Ilse-Marie; Richard	Jacqui; Rabin	Jacqui; Mandy	Andre	Third place (Day 79)	
Andre	Carol; Thando	Carol; Groschaan	Carol; Groschaan	Carol; Ilse-Marie	Ilse-Marie; Mandy	Puledi; Richard	Mandy; Rabin	Mandy; Richard	Richard	Evicted (Day 72)	
Mandy	Dominique; Groschaan	Groschaan; Richard	Groschaan; Jacqui	Jacqui; Richard	Jacqui; Richard	Andre; Rabin	Andre; Jacqui	Andre; Richard	Evicted (Day 64)		
Rabin	Carol; Dominique	Carol; Richard	Carol; Richard	Carol; Richard	Mandy; Zlatko	Mandy; Richard	Mandy; Richard	Evicted (Day 56)			
Ilse-Marie	Carol; Dominique	Carol; Thando	Puledi; Zlatko	Richard; Zlatko	Richard; Zlatko	Puledi; Richard	Evicted (Day 48)				
Zlatko	Dominique; Thando	Mandy; Thando	Groschaan; Jacqui	Ilse-Marie; Jacqui	Ilse-Marie; Mandy	Evicted (Day 40)					
Carol	Groschaan; Ilse-Marie	Groschaan; Ilse-Marie	Groschaan; Jacqui	Ilse-Marie; Richard	Evicted (Day 32)						
Groschaan	Dominique; Mandy	Mandy; Thando	Puledi; Richard	Evicted (Day 24)							
Thando	Groschaan; Ilse-Marie	Groschaan; Richard	Evicted (Day 16)								
Dominique	Groschaan; Zlatko	Evicted (Day 8)									
Michelle	Not in House	Walked (Day 8)									
Up for eviction	Carol; Dominique; Groschaan; Thando	Groschaan; Richard; Thando	Groschaan; Jacqui; Puledi; Richard	Carol; Ilse-Marie; Jacqui; Richard; Zlatko	Ilse-Marie; Mandy; Zlatko	Ilse-Marie; Richard	Mandy; Rabin	Mandy; Richard	Andre; Richard	All housemates	
Walked	Michelle	none									
Evicted	Dominique	Thando	Groschaan	Carol	Zlatko	Ilse-Marie	Rabin	Mandy	Andre	Puledi; 3.13% to win	Jacqui; 22% to win
Evicted	Dominique	Thando	Groschaan	Carol	Zlatko	Ilse-Marie	Rabin	Mandy	Andre	Richard; 75% to win	

== Big Brother Mzansi ==
=== Season 1 ===
On 12 June 2013, MultiChoice announced that its local brand, M-Net and Mzansi Magic, would produce another South African edition of Big Brother, with the show being rebranded as Big Brother Mzansi, which was set to air in January 2014. It marked the South African editions return, 12 years after the previous season ended. It began on 2 February 2014. Lungile Radu was the host. After 63 days Mandla emerged as the winner of this season.

=== Season 2 ===
Due to success of the previous season, Big Brother Mzansi came back in 2015. The theme for this season was "Double Trouble". Housemates entered the house in pairs and were compete against each other for R2 Million. The show lasted for 56 days. Lungile Radu returned as this season's host. After 56 days Ntombi and Ace emerged as the winners of the show.

=== Season 3 ===
After a six-year hiatus, the third season of Big Brother Mzansi premiered on 23 January 2022 with a new theme "Beke Le Beke". Lawrence Maleka was the host for this season. After 71 days on 3 April 2022, Mphowabadimo was declared the winner and received R2 million, while Gash1 was the runner-up.

=== Season 4 ===
The fourth season of Big Brother Mzansi premiered on 21 January 2024 with Lawrence Maleka returning as the host. The theme for this season is "S'ya Mosha". McJunior was declared a winner while Makhekhe was a runner up.

=== Season 5 ===
The fifth season of Big Brother Mzansi premiered on 12 January 2025 with Smash Afrika as the new host.The theme for this season is "Umlilo". Sweet Guluva was declared a winner while Uyanda was a runner up.

=== Season 6 ===
The sixth season of Big Brother Mzansi premiered on 11 January 2026 with Smash Afrika returning as the host.The theme for this season is "Bazozwa". Liema was the winner, while Thandeka was the runner-up.

== Trivia ==
- Total number of days on air: 591 days
- Total number of housemates: 93 housemates
- Total number of housemates that walked: 7 housemates
- Total number of ejections: 4 housemates

== See also ==
- Big Brother franchise
