= Bravo B =

South African television personality (born 1998)

- Bravo B in 2026
- Born: Lindokuhle Nsele; 1998 (age 27–28); Durban, Kwazulu Natal, South Africa
- Occupations: Influencer; television personality
- Years active: 2024–present
- Television: Big Brother Mzansi season 4; Big Brother Mzansi season 6

Lindokuhle Nsele (born 1998), professionally known as Bravo B, is a South African television personality and influencer. He gained a recognition after being evicted on Big Brother Mzansi season 4 on the first week and was crowned the 2nd Runner-Up of the Big Brother Mzansi season 6.

== Career ==
Nsele's career gained national prominence in early 2024, when he was a housemate in Big Brother Mzansi season 4 (S’ya Mosha). However, he got disqualified within the first week following a controversial conversation regarding a female housemate that violated the production’s code of conduct regarding Gender based violence and offensive speech. Following this setback in 2025, he focused on a path of rehabilitation and advocacy, engaging in counselling and peer educational groups to address the impact of his remarks.

In January 2026, Nsele returned to the show of Big Brother Mzansi season 6 (Bazozwa) as a "redemption" contestant with other housemates Liema, Mmeli and Dube. He sought to establish his career as a scriptwriter and director while promoting the Inkabi Nation brand. He finished the show as the 2nd Runner-Up with 14,90%, where Liema was crowned the Winner and Thandeka the 1st Runner-Up.

== Public image ==
Nsele gained wider attention during his time on Big Brother Mzansi season 4 in 2024, where his bold and expressive nature made him both popular and controversial among viewers. His public image took a hit after his disqualification from the show, an incident that sparked widespread discussion online and in the media. Following this, he publicly apologised for his actions, acknowledging the situation and attempting to address the backlash.

== Filmography ==
Year	Title	Role	Notes
2024	Big Brother Mzansi season 4	Contestant	Ejected, 1st week
2025	Big Brother Mzansi Reunion	Himself	Part 1
2026	Big Brother Mzansi season 6	Contestant	2nd runner-up
