= Big Brother Mzansi season 1 =

Big Brother Mzansi
- Season 1
- No. of days: 63
- No. of housemates: 18
- Winner: Mandla
- Runner-up: Iris

Release
- Original network: Mzansi Magic
- Original release: 2 February – 6 April 2014

Series chronology
- ← Previous; Big Brother South Africa Next → Season 2

Big Brother Mzansi: Secrets (also known as Big Brother Mzansi 1 or Big Brother South Africa 3) was the third season of the South African Big Brother reality television series reboot produced by Endemol for M-Net. It began on 2 February 2014 with an original host, Mark Pilgrim. The season was sponsored by South African drink brand service, Coca-Cola. This season also use some of the game mechanics from the Secret Story franchise.

== Housemates ==
Housemates	Age On Entry	Occupation	Residence	Day entered	Day exited	Status
Mandla	24	Spaza Shop Owner	Sebokeng	1	63	Winner
Iris	21	Model	Vrede	1 (Chamber)	63	Runner-Up
Loko	22	Artists Manager	Kempton Park	1	63	3rd Place
MK	32	Regional Portfolio Manager	Durban	1	63	4th Place
Sol	26	Radio DJ	Johannesburg	1	63	5th Place
Kat	23	Assistant	Johannesburg	1	63	Bribed
Lexi	25	Customer Care Professional	Cape Town	1	56	Evicted
Poolie	29	Warehouse Clerk	Mitchell's Plain	1	56	Evicted
Thando	23	Marketing	Aliwal North	01	49	Evicted
Mzamo	27	Fashion Entrepreneur	Durban	1	49	Evicted
Jase	21	Student	Durban	1	42	Evicted
Lola	23	Student	Pietermaritzburg	1	35	Evicted
Kgosi	25	Aspiring Filmmaker	Hartebeespoort	1 (Chamber)	28	Evicted
Vanessa	23	Account Executive	Ermelo	1	21	Evicted
Jenayne	23	Events & Venue Manager	Ermelo	1 (Chamber)	14	Evicted
Nku	29	PR Consultant	Durban	1 (Chamber)	14	Evicted
Paris	23	Student, Music Producer	Johannesburg	1 (Chamber)	14	Evicted
Mbali	26	Marketing Coordinator	Soweto, Dube	1 (Chamber)	13	Disqualified

=== Iris ===
She entered the Chamber on Day 1. She was up for eviction in Week 1 where the housemates in Main House would vote for the chambermate of their choice to enter the Main House she only received 2 votes. In Week 2, she was up for public vote to move to the Main House according to the popularity vote she was in second place but due to the expulsion of Mbali who was the frontrunner Iris moved in the Main House with 25% of public vote. In Week 4 after the boys failed the Secrets Task they were all up for eviction, HoH Jase saved himself and replaced himself with Iris. She then survived public vote after she received 38% of votes to save. She then faced eviction in Week 7 when she was one of the 5 housemates who were conspiring against Lexi which is against the rules. She survived public vote after receiving 11% of votes to save. In Week 8 she was nominated by her fellow housemates for eviction she survived after garnering 29% of votes to save. In the Final Week 9 she came in 2nd place after receiving 20.24% votes to win.

=== Jase ===
He entered the Main House on Day 1. In Week 4 he faced eviction after losing the Secrets task with all the boys but he saved himself as HoH and replaced himself with Iris. In Week 5 he faced eviction after his fellow housemates nominated him and he survived eviction after receiving 22% of votes to save. In Week 6 he faced eviction again in a row after nominations were tallied he was evicted on Day 42 after only receiving 25% of votes to save.

=== Jenayne ===
She entered the Chamber on Day 1. In Week 1 the housemates in the Main House would decide which Chambermate would join then, she only received 2 votes out of 12. In Week 2 she faced public vote to move to Main House but ultimately she evicted on Day 14 with 16% of the public vote to move. er

=== Kat ===
She entered the Main House on Day 1. In Week 3 she faced public vote after the girls failed their task, she survived after getting 26% of votes to save. In Week 5 she was nominated for possible eviction and she survived after getting 61% of the votes to save. In Week 7 she was faced public vote after she was one of the 5 housemates caught conspiring against Lexi, she survived eviction after getting 11% of votes to save. In Final Week 9 she voluntarily left the house on the finale Day 63 a receiving money more than R100.000 if she had not opted to leave she would've came in 3rd place as she had received 11.11% of the votes to win.

=== Kgosi ===
He entered the Chamber on Day 1. In Week 1 he receiving the most votes from the housemates in the Main House 7 out of 12, he then moved into the Main House. In Wee 4 he faced eviction after the boys failed the Secrets Task. He was evicted on Day 28 after receiving on 8.6% of public vote to save.

=== Lexi ===
She entered the Main House on Day 1. In Week 3 she faced public vote after the girls failed the Secrets task she survived eviction after receiving 17% of votes to save. In Week 6 she faced eviction after nominations were tallied she survived eviction after receiving 45% of votes to save. In Week 7 after all housemates faced eviction she received 26% of votes to save. In Week 8 she faced eviction after the nominations were tallied she was evicted on Day 56 after only receiving 27% of votes to save.

=== Lola ===
She entered the Main House on Day 1. In Week 5 she was nominated for eviction and was evicted with 6% of votes to save.

=== Mandla ===
He entered the Main House on Day 1. In Week 7 he faced eviction after all housemates were up for eviction due to conspiracy, he survived after receiving 21% of the public vote. In Week 8 he was nominated for eviction by his fellow housemates and he survived after receiving 38% of votes to save. In Final Week 9 he became the winner of Big Brother Mzansi 2014 after receiving 55% of votes to win.

=== Mbali ===
He entered the Chamber on Day 1. In Week 1 he faced possible move to the Main House but he couldn't garner any votes for the housemates in the Main House. In Week 2 he faced public vote to move to the Main House he received the highest vote to move 35% but he was ejected on Day 13 for slapping Iris.

=== MK ===
He entered the Main House on Day 1. In Week 3 all girls except Lola and Iris faced eviction, HOH Mzamo saved Thando and replaced him with MK. He then survived public vote of receiving 28% of votes from the public. In Week 4 he faced eviction as all the boys failed the Secrets task he survived 16% of votes to save. In Week 7 all housemates were nominated for possible eviction after the conspiracy rule was broken. He survived eviction after getting 7% of public vote. In Final Week 9 he came in 4th place after only getting 4.14% to win.

=== Mzamo ===
He entered the Main House on Day 1. In Week 4 he was nominated for eviction after all the boys failed the Secrets Task, he survived the public vote after receiving 13% of votes to save. In Week 7 he was one of the 5 housemates who conspired against Lexi and for that reason all housemates faced public vote. He was evicted on Day 49 after getting 3.5% of votes to save.

=== Nku ===
She entered the Chamber on Day 1. In Week 1 she received only 1 vote from the housemates in the Main House to move. In Week 2 she faced public vote to move to the Main House but she was evicted on Day 14 after getting 12% of votes to move.

=== Paris ===
He entered the Chamber on Day 1. In Week 1 he received only 0 votes out of 12 from the housemates in the Main House to move. In Week 2 he faced public vote to move to the Main House and he was evicted on Day 14 after getting 12% of votes to move.

=== Poolie ===
He entered the Main House on Day 1. In Week 4 he faced public vote after all the boys failed the Secrets Task, he survived eviction after getting 15% of votes to save. In Week 7 as all housemates were nominated for eviction due to the breaking of the conspiracy rule. He survived public vote after getting 5% of votes to save. In Week 8 he was nominated for eviction but he was evicted after getting 6% of votes to save.

=== Sol ===
He entered the Main House on Day 1. In Week 4 he faced eviction after all boys failed the Secrets Task, he survived after getting 9% of votes to save. In Week 6 he faced public vote and he survived after receiving 30% of votes to save. In Week 7 as all housemates faced public vote he survived eviction after getting 6% of votes to save. In Final Week 9 he came in 5th place after getting 1.43% of votes to save.

=== Thando ===
She entered the Main House on Day 1. In Week 3 as the girls failed Secrets Task she faced eviction but HOH Mzamo saved her from public vote. In Week 5 HOH Sol saved Mandla and replaced him with Thando, she then survived public vote after getting 11% of votes to save. In Week 7 she was one of the 5 housemates who were caught breaking the no-conspiracy rule so all housemates faced public vote she was evicted on Day 49 after getting 4.5% of votes to save.

=== Vanessa ===
She entered the Main House on Day 1. In Week 3 she faced public vote as all the girls failed the Secrets Task she was then evicted on Day 21 after only getting 10% of votes to save.

== Twists ==
=== The Chamber ===
On Day 1, six housemates Jenayne, Paris, Nku, Kgosi, Mbali and Iris (named Chambermates) entered in The Chamber.

On Day 5, housemates currently on the Main House voted for who between the Chambermates they want to see in the Main House. The votes were later revealed at Day 7, during the live show. It was revealed that Kgosi was chosen by the housemates to enter the Main House, with 7 votes.

The public voted for who should also enter in the Main House, with the other 4 being evicted from the House. After Mbali was ejected, Iris, who got the most votes after Mbali, moved to the Main House, while Jenayne, Nku and Paris were evicted.

=== Secrets ===
Like in the Big Brother Australia 2012, females were called to the Parlour Room and had to correctly guess the all males' secrets.

As they failed to guess the males' secrets, the males are all immune for nominations in Week 3. On the next week, it the same twist happened, but this time it was the males that had to guess females' secrets. As they guessed wrong, all females won immunity.

Secret	Housemate
Boys
I am a Britney Spears fan	Mandla
I got caught for downloading porn at work	Sol
I am acrophobic	Mzamo
I have a fetish for Chinese Dwarfs	Poolie
I have never dated anyone for more than 21 days	Jase
I coached a provincial table tennis team	MK
I used to belong to a cult	Kgosi
Girls
I grew up on the streets	Lexi
I have musophobia	Thando
I am of Royal blood	Loko
I have breast implants	Vanessa
I am a serial soccer star dater	Iris
I have a sex position bucket list	Kat
I was born with a club foot	Lola

=== Immunity challenges ===
After the girls guessing wrongly male's secrets, all males won immunity. On Day 15, after winning a challenge, Jase and Lola won immunity from the nominations. After that, all girls were put up for eviction, with exception of Iris (who was new in the House) and Lola (who won immunity). However, HoH Mzamo could save one of the girls, and replace her with a male. He chose to save Thando, and nominate MK in her place.

On Week 4, it happened the same, but with an exception. After the boys guessing wrongly female's secrets, all females won immunity. On Day 22, after winning a challenge, Kat and Mandla won immunity from the nominations. After that, all boys were put up for eviction, with exception of Mandla (who won immunity). However, HoH Jase could save one of the boys, and replace him with a female. He chose to save himself, and nominate Iris in his place.

On Week 5, after the housemates nominated, it was held an immunity challenge. Mzamo and Lexi won it, and are the only saved housemates for the nominations. Sol, as HoH, decided to sace Mandla and put Thando in his place.

On Week 6, Loko and Mandla won the immunity challenge after the nominations were held. Mzamo as HoH, saved Thando and nominated Sol in her place.

On Week 7, due to the Housemates breaking the no conspiracy rule, Big Brother decided to put up all Housemates for eviction.

On Week 8, Kat and Sol won the immunity challenge after the nominations were held. Because most Housemates are up for eviction, no Save and Replace session was held.

=== Guest Housemate ===
On week 7, Emmett Blois, an ex-housemate from Big Brother Canada, entered the Big Brother Mzansi House with orders from Big Brother to "shake things up in the house". In an attempt to split-up the relationships, Emmett requested Big Brother to go on a date with the remaining female Housemates - Kat, Iris, Lexi and Loko - to which Big Brother approved. He also tried manipulating the male Housemates into thinking that the female Housemates were playing a game on them, however he was overheard by Loko. He also took part in that week's Task Presentation where Housemates had to dramatise a scene whereby the tour guides (Mandla and MK) showed the rest of the Housemates through Beautiful Mzansi. Blois also formed a close friendship with fellow-Housemate, MK. Emmett left the House the following Sunday and was interviewed by host, Lungile Radu. Viewers of Big Brother Mzansi nicknamed Blois, "White Chocolate."

== Nomination History ==
	Week 1	Week 2	Week 3	Week 4	Week 5	Week 6	Week 7	Week 8	Week 9		Nominations & votes received
Head of House	Mzamo	Mandla	Mzamo	Jase	Sol	Mzamo	Mzamo	Loko	none		Nominations & votes received
Mandla	Iris	No; Voting	No; Voting	Exempt	Poolie, Lola	Jase, Thando	~~Thando,~~; ~~Iris~~	Poolie, Iris	Winner (Day 63)		10
Iris	In the Chamber		Exempt	Nominated	Lexi, Jase	Lexi, Jase	~~Lexi,~~; ~~Sol~~	Lexi, Sol	Runner-Up (Day 63)		6
Loko	Kgosi	No; Voting	Nominated	No; Voting	MK, Lexi	Lexi, Mandla	~~Lexi,~~; ~~Sol~~	Mandla, Lexi	3rd place (Day 63)		0
MK	Kgosi	No; Voting	Nominated	Nominated	Jase, Lexi	Lexi, Jase	~~Kat,~~; ~~Lexi~~	Lexi, Mandla	4th place (Day 63)		3
Sol	Kgosi	No; Voting	No; Voting	Nominated	Lexi, Lola	Jase, Lexi	~~Poolie,~~; ~~Thando~~	Iris, Poolie	5th place (Day 63)		8
Kat	Iris	No; Voting	Nominated	Exempt	Lola, Thando	Jase, Thando	~~Lexi,~~; ~~Sol~~	Lexi, Poolie	Bribed (Day 63)		6
Lexi	Kgosi	No; Voting	Nominated	No nominations	Jase, Mzamo	Thando, Jase	~~Thando,~~; ~~Kat~~	Iris, MK	Evicted (Day 56)		
Poolie	Jenayne	No; Voting	No; Voting	Nominated	Mandla, Kat	Mandla, Kat	~~Lexi,~~; ~~Kat~~	Mandla, Sol	Evicted (Day 56)		
Thando	Kgosi	No; Voting	No; Voting	No; Voting	Kat, Mandla	Lexi, Sol	~~Lexi,~~; ~~Mandla~~	Evicted (Day 49)			
Mzamo	Nku	No; Voting	No; Voting	Nominated	Lexi, Jase	Lexi, Mandla	~~Lexi,~~; ~~Sol~~	Evicted (Day 49)			
Jase	Jenayne	No; Voting	Exempt	No; Voting	Mandla, MK	Lexi, Sol	Evicted (Day 42)				
Lola	Kgosi	No; Voting	Exempt	No; Voting	Kat, Mandla	Evicted (Day 35)					
Kgosi	In the Chamber	No; Voting	No; Voting	Nominated	Evicted (Day 28)						
Vanessa	Kgosi	No; Voting	Nominated	Evicted (Day 21)							
Jenayne	In the Chamber		Evicted (Day 14)								
Nku	In the Chamber		Evicted (Day 14)								
Paris	In the Chamber		Evicted (Day 14)								
Mbali	In the Chamber		Ejected (Day 13)								
Against public vote	Iris; Jenayne; Kgosi; Mbali; Nku; Paris	Iris; Jenayne; ~~Mbali~~; Nku; Paris	Kat; Lexi; Loko; MK; Vanessa	Iris; Kgosi; MK; Mzamo; Poolie; Sol	Jase; Kat; Lola; Thando	Jase; Lexi; Sol	Iris; Kat; Lexi; Loko; Mandla; MK; Mzamo; Poolie; Sol; Thando	Iris; Lexi; Mandla; Poolie	Iris; ~~Kat~~; Loko; Mandla; MK; Sol		
Walked	none								Kat		
Ejected	none	Mbali	none								
Evicted	No Eviction	Nku; Paris; 12% to move	Vanessa; 10% to save	Kgosi; 8.6% to save	Lola; 6% to save	Jase; 25% to save	Mzamo; 3.5% to save	Poolie; 6% to save	Sol; 1.43% to save		
Evicted	No Eviction	Nku; Paris; 12% to move	Vanessa; 10% to save	Kgosi; 8.6% to save	Lola; 6% to save	Jase; 25% to save	Mzamo; 3.5% to save	Poolie; 6% to save	MK; 4.14% to save	Loko; 7.68% to save	
Evicted	No Eviction	Jenayne; 16% to move	Vanessa; 10% to save	Kgosi; 8.6% to save	Lola; 6% to save	Jase; 25% to save	Thando; 4.5% to save	Lexi; 27% to save	Iris; 20.24% to win		
Survived	Kgosi; 7 of 12 votes to move	Iris; 25% to move	Lexi; 17% to save Loko; 19% to save Kat; 26% to save MK; 28% to save	Sol; 9% to save Mzamo; 13% to save Poolie; 15% to save MK; 16% to save Iris; 38% to save	Thando; 11% to save Jase; 22% to save Kat; 61% to save	Sol; 30% to save Lexi; 45% to save	Loko; Poolie; 5% to save Sol; 6% to save MK; 7% to save Kat; Iris; 11% to save Mandla; 21% to save Lexi; 26% to save	Iris; 29% to save Mandla; 38% to save	Mandla; 55.4% to win		
