= Mark Pilgrim (presenter) =

South African radio and television presenter (1969–2023)

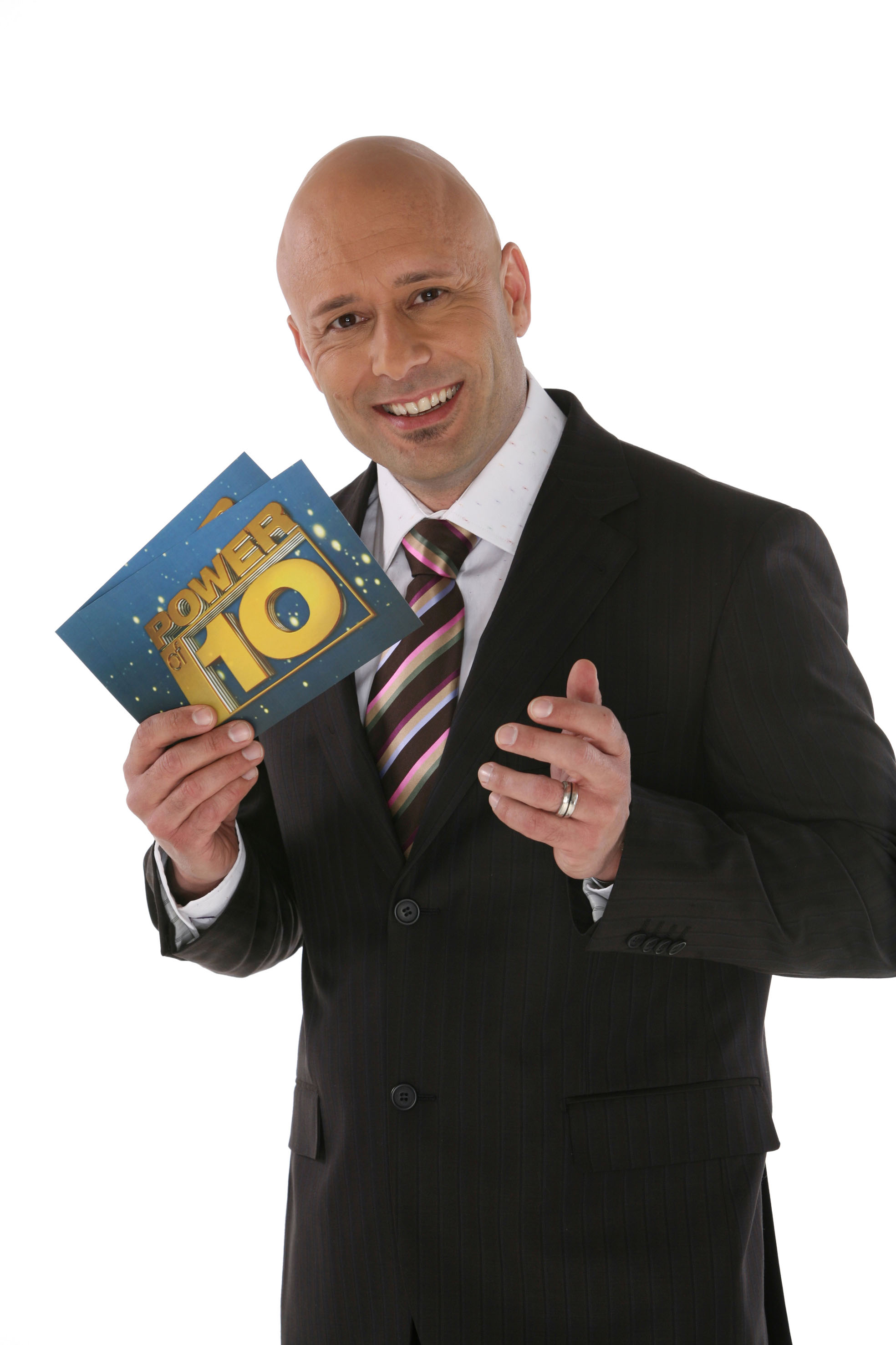
- Pilgrim as the host of South Africa's Power of 10 TV game show
- Born: 20 September 1969; Kent, England
- Died: 5 March 2023 (aged 53); Johannesburg, Gauteng, South Africa
- Occupation(s): Radio and television presenter

Mark Pilgrim (20 September 1969 – 5 March 2023) was a South African media personality who hosted numerous radio and television shows, most notably as a DJ on 5FM, Eastrand-oos Rand Stereo, 94.7 Highveld Stereo, 94.5 Kfm, Hot919 and Hot102.7fm. On television, he hosted both seasons of Big Brother South Africa, the first season of Big Brother Africa, and the M-Net game show Power of 10.

== Radio career ==
Pilgrim started his radio career on Voice of Wits campus radio in the 80s. He joined 5FM in 1995. In 2003 he left 5FM and joined 94.7 Highveld Stereo in Johannesburg. In October 2007, Pilgrim hosted a chart show broadcast on two radio stations simultaneously (KFM and 94.7). He retired from radio at the end of June 2014, but returned several months later on Hot 91.9FM in Johannesburg. He initially hosted a Saturday morning show from 9:00 am to 12:00 pm, before resuming full-time radio work with a weekday slot at the same time. In 2015, he won the MTN Radio Award for Best Weekend Radio Show in South Africa, and in 2019 won the Liberty Radio Award for Best Daytime Show in South Africa. In 2021, he was inducted into the South African Radio Awards Hall of Fame for his contribution to the radio industry. In 2022, Pilgrim was part of 13 nominations at the South African Radio Awards and won the award for Best Weekend Radio Show in South Africa, receiving a standing ovation in celebration of his success.

== Television career ==
- New Moves (e-TV: 1999–2000)
- Big Brother South Africa 1 (MNET: 2001)
- Big Brother South Africa 2 (MNET: 2002)
- Big Brother Africa (DStv: 2003)
- Retail Therapy (MNET: 2002–2005)
- Face 2 Face (SABC2: 2004)
- Sex Etc. (MNET: 2005)
- Blue Wave (CORPORATE: 2004–2018)
- What's Brewing (CORPORATE: 2007–2008)
- Power of 10 (MNET: 2008)

== Other work ==
Pilgrim was a regular DJ at corporate functions and nightclubs around the country.

As a voice artist, he spent many hours in post-production studios, narrating radio and TV commercials. He performed as an MC for numerous corporate gala evenings.

He was a motivational speaker, sharing his experience with testicular cancer, how he overcame it and how it pushed him to follow his dreams.

== Consumer researcher ==
Before getting involved in the entertainment industry, Pilgrim completed a B.Com. in industrial psychology and business economics, and was a quantitative consumer researcher for nine years, beginning at Market Research Africa, before moving to Research International and later Kauffman Levine. He was also the Johannesburg Chairman of the South African Market Research Association (SAMRA).

== Personal life ==
Pilgrim was diagnosed with stage 3 testicular cancer in 1988. It was an aggressive form of cancer and spread to his lungs and kidneys. After nine months of chemotherapy, he was declared to be in remission. He later became an ambassador for CANSA (Cancer Association of South Africa) and a friend of the Reach for a Dream Foundation.

On 14 July 2008, Pilgrim suffered a sudden and severe heart attack at his doctor's office. Although he sustained permanent heart damage (losing about 10% of his heart function), immediate medical intervention saved his life.

Pilgrim married Nicole Torres in Mauritius on 7 July 2007 and after almost 13 years together, filed for divorce in 2020. Their first daughter Tayla-Jean was born in April 2010, followed by their second daughter Alyssa in 2012.

Pilgrim went on to meet Adrienne Watkins, through mutual friends and dated Adrienne from 2020. He proposed to her on 31 December 2022 at their home in Johannesburg.

Pilgrim completed a Master of Business Administration (MBA) through Edinburgh Business School at Heriot-Watt University in the United Kingdom in 2020.

=== Death ===
In February 2022, Pilgrim was diagnosed with stage 4 lung cancer. He died on 5 March 2023 at the age of 53, at home in Johannesburg, with Adrienne by his side.
