= Big Brother Mzansi season 2 =

Big Brother Mzansi
- Season 2
- Hosted by: Lungile Radu
- No. of days: 56
- No. of housemates: 22
- Winners: Ace and Ntombi
- Runners-up: K2 and Blue

Release
- Original network: Mzansi Magic; DStv
- Original release: 22 March – 18 May 2015

Season chronology
- ← Previous; Season 1 Next → Season 3

Big Brother Mzansi: Double Trouble (also known as Big Brother Mzansi 2 or Big Brother South Africa 4) is the second season of the South African Big Brother reality television reboot series produced by Endemol for M-Net and Mzansi Magic. The launch was divided in two nights, being the dates 22 March and 23 March 2015 and concluded on 18 May 2015 when the couple, Ace and Ntombi have crowned the winners with Blue and K2 were the runner-ups. The show was hosted by Lungile Radu again. The season lasted 56 days, making it the shortest South African Big Brother.

== Housemates ==
Housemates	Age on Entry	Occupation	Hometown	Day entered	Day exited	Status
Nkanyiso "Ace" Khumalo	24	Aspiring entertainer	Johannesburg	1	56	Winners
Ntombifuthi "Ntombi" Tshabalala	22	Aspiring musician	Johannesburg	1	56	Winners
Thandi "Blue" Mbombo	25	PR freelancer, Model	Johannesburg	2	56	Runner-Ups
Katlego "K2" Mabusela	24	Rapper	Johannesburg	2	56	Runner-Ups
Chelsea Hamfrey	21	Freelance model	Durban	2	56	3rd Place
Mbali Nkosi	25	Sales and Marketing co-ordinator	Midrand	2	56	3rd Place
Sokhana "Soxx" Ralana	26	Student	Queenstown	1	49	Evicted
Tembela "Tembi" Magandela-Mthupha	25	Actress, Dancer & Scriptwriter	Port Shepstone	1	49	Evicted
Keitumetse "Kay" Mariti	23	Administrator	Soweto	2	42	Evicted
Pumlani "Pumba" Ndlovu	28	Professional basketball player	Kimberly	2	42	Evicted
Abongile "Bongi" Mbauli	28	Customer service agent, Tech support	Cape Town		35	Evicted
Khali Masoane	24	Digital specialist	Vereeniging		35	Evicted
Axola "Bexx" Mbengo	26	Insurance sales consultants	Queenstown	1	23	Disqualified
Siyanda "Adams" Ngwenya	24	Artist/Musician	Durban	1	23	Disqualified
Eugene "Gino" Smith	35	Chess-board maker	Cape Town	1	21	Evicted
Tiffini Peterson	23	Hostess & Freelance model	Cape Town	1	21	Evicted
Matt "Matthias" Matthee	29	Business owner	Johannesburg	2	14	Evicted
Sibusiso "Sibuyo" Sithole	31	Fashion designer, DJ & Model	Soweto	2	14	Evicted
Johannes "Ex" Motalane	23	Musician & Performing artist	Pretoria	2	7	Walked
Kelebogile "Lebo" Manale	22	Sociology graduate	Soweto	2	7	Walked

== Twists ==
=== Pairs ===
On Day 1, each housemate entered the house with another housemate whom they had already a relationship with before entering the show. The pairs were:

- Bongi & Khali, dating for 3 months
- Bexx & Soxx, cousins
- Tembi & Adams, former couple
- Tiffini & Gino, sister & brother
- Ntombi & Ace, dating for 5 years

However, on Day 2, the second part of the launch, the pairs selected had no previous relationships.

After the expulsion of Adams and the removal of Bexx from the Big Brother Mzansi house on Day 23, their respective partners Tembi and Soxx were asked if they wanted to leave with them or not. Both decided to stay, meaning Soxx and Tembi became an official pair in the game.

== Nomination History ==
		Week 1	Week 2	Week 3	Week 4	Week 5	Week 6	Week 7	Week 8
	Ace	No; Nominations	Kay & Pumba; Bexx & Soxx	Bexx & Soxx; Bexx & Soxx	No; Nominations	—N/a	Nominated	Soxx & Tembi; Chelsea & Mbali	Winners (Day 57)
	Ntombi	No; Nominations	Matthias & Sibu; Bexx & Soxx	Blue & K2; Bexx & Soxx	No; Nominations	—N/a	Nominated	Chelsea & Mbali; Chelsea & Mbali	Winners (Day 57)
	Blue	No; Nominations	Matthias & Sibu; Matthias & Sibu	Adams & Tembi; Chelsea & Mbali	No; Nominations	—N/a	Nominated	Soxx & Tembi; Soxx & Tembi	Runners-Up (Day 57)
	K2	No; Nominations	Matthias & Sibu; Matthias & Sibu	Chelsea & Mbali; Chelsea & Mbali	No; Nominations	—N/a	Nominated	Soxx & Tembi; Soxx & Tembi	Runners-Up (Day 57)
	Chelsea	No; Nominations	Gino & Tiffini; Gino & Tiffini	Adams & Tembi; Adams & Tembi	No; Nominations	—N/a	Nominated	Soxx & Tembi; Soxx & Tembi	Third place (Day 57)
	Mbali	No; Nominations	Kay & Pumba; Gino & Tiffini	Bongi & Khali; Adams & Tembi	No; Nominations	—N/a	Nominated	Soxx & Tembi; Soxx & Tembi	Third place (Day 57)
1	Soxx	No; Nominations	Chelsea & Mbali; Chelsea & Mbali	Gino & Tiffini; Chelsea & Mbali	No; Nominations	—N/a	No; Nominations	Chelsea & Mbali; Chelsea & Mbali	Evicted (Day 50)
1	Tembi	No; Nominations	Gino & Tiffini; Gino & Tiffini	Gino & Tiffini; Chelsea & Mbali	No; Nominations	—N/a	No; Nominations	Blue & K2; Chelsea & Mbali	Evicted (Day 50)
	Kay	No; Nominations	Matthias & Sibu; Matthias & Sibu	Gino & Tiffini; Chelsea & Mbali	No; Nominations	—N/a	Nominated	Evicted (Day 43)	
	Pumba	No; Nominations	Ace & Ntombi; Matthias & Sibu	Blue & K2; Chelsea & Mbali	No; Nominations	—N/a	Nominated	Evicted (Day 43)	
	Bongi	No; Nominations	Matthias & Sibu; Chelsea & Mbali	Blue & K2; Chelsea & Mbali	No; Nominations	—N/a	Evicted (Day 36)		
	Khali	No; Nominations	Gino & Tiffini; Chelsea & Mbali	Gino & Tiffini; Chelsea & Mbali	No; Nominations	—N/a	Evicted (Day 36)		
	Bexx	No; Nominations	Matthias & Sibu; Chelsea & Mbali	Gino & Tiffini; Chelsea & Mbali	No nominations	Ejected (Day 23)			
	Adams	No; Nominations	Gino & Tiffini; Gino & Tiffini	Gino & Tiffini; Chelsea & Mbali	No nominations	Ejected (Day 23)			
	Gino	No; Nominations	Kay & Pumba; Adams & Tembi	Chelsea & Mbali; Adams & Tembi	Evicted (Day 22)				
	Tiffini	No; Nominations	Adams & Tembi; Adams & Tembi	Adams & Tembi; Adams & Tembi	Evicted (Day 22)				
	Matthias	No; Nominations	Gino & Tiffini; Gino & Tiffini	Evicted (Day 15)					
	Sibu	No; Nominations	Gino & Tiffini; Gino & Tiffini	Evicted (Day 15)					
	Ex	No; Nominations	Walked (Day 8)						
	Lebo	No; Nominations	Walked (Day 8)						
Notes		1	2	3	4	5	6	7	none
Head of House		Ex & Lebo	Blue & K2	Kay & Pumba	Chelsea & Mbali	Soxx & Tembi	Soxx & Tembi	Blue & K2	No; HoH
Up for eviction		No; Eviction	Bongi, Khali, Matthias, Sibu	Bexx, Soxx; Chelsea, Mbali; Gino, Tiffini	Eviction; Cancelled	Ace, Ntombi, Blue, K2, Bongi, Khali, Chelsea, Mbali, Kay, Pumba	Ace, Ntombi, Blue, K2, Chelsea, Mbali, Kay, Pumba	Chelsea, Mbali, Soxx, Tembi	Ace, Ntombi; Blue, K2; Chelsea, Mbali
Walked		Ex; Lebo	none						
Ejected		none			Bexx; Adams	none			
Survived Eviction		No; Eviction	Bongi; Khali; 55% to save	Bexx; Soxx; 42% to save Chelsea; Mbali; 37% to save	Eviction; Cancelled	Ace; Ntombi; 45% to save Blue; K2; 32% to save Chelsea; Mbali; 16% to save Kay; Pumba; 5% to save	Ace; Ntombi; 47.9% to save Blue; K2; 34.1% to save Chelsea; Mbali; 14.3% to save	Chelsea; Mbali; 53% to save	Ace; Ntombi; 62.06% to win
Evicted		No; Eviction	Matthias; Sibu; 45% to save	Gino; Tiffini; 21% to save	Eviction; Cancelled	Bongi; Khali; 2% to save	Kay; Pumba; 3.7% to save	Soxx; Tembi; 47% to save	Blue; K2; 29.93% to win Chelsea; Mbali; 8.01% to win

=== Notes ===
1. Ex answered the red telephone and Biggie ordered him to exit the house with Lebo in tow. Once on stage, the pair was given an ultimatum - it was either they take R100 000.00 and exit the game or they reject it and stay in the running for the ultimate R2 Million prize. They decided to exit the game after some talk.
2. Blue & K2 won immunity in the Friday Night Games. The nominations were divided in two rounds: the first one was on Sunday, in which each housemate nominated a pair and the second one was on Monday, in which each pair nominated another pair. The results were added, and Gino & Tiffini and Matthias & Sibu were the initial nominees. Then Blue & K2 won the HoH and decided to save Gino & Tiffini and replaced them with Bongi & Khali. The public voted to save a single housemate and not a pair.
3. The nominations were again divided in two rounds: the first one was on Sunday, in which each housemate nominated a pair and the second one was on Monday, in which each pair nominated another pair. The results were added, and Adams & Tembi, Chelsea & Mbali and Gino & Tiffini were the initial nominees. Then Kay & Pumba won the HoH and decided to save Adams & Tembi and replaced them with Bexx & Soxx. The public voted to save a single housemate and not a pair.
4. Due to the expulsion of Adams and removal of Bexx this week's nominations were null and void thus the evictions was cancelled. Chelsea and Mbali still remained Heads of House for the week.
5. The nominations were again divided in two rounds: the first one, in which each housemate nominated a pair and the second one, in which each pair nominated another pair. However, this time the nominations were done face-to-face during the live show. The results were added, and Blue & K2, Chelsea & Mbali, Kay & Pumba and Ace & Ntombi were the initial nominees. Then Soxx & Tembi won the HoH and decided to save Chelsea & Mbali and replaced them with Bongi & Khali. However, Blue & K2 had a power of nomination dagger, and with it put Chelsea & Mbali on the nominations again. The public voted to save a single housemate and not a pair.
6. As this was NonSense Week (Fake Week) everything that happened from Monday to Friday were null and void. On Friday, housemates competed in HoH challenge which Soxx & Tembi won thus giving them immunity from eviction. Big Brother then nominated all the other housemates for possible eviction on Sunday.
7. The nominations were again divided in two rounds: the first one, in which each housemate nominated a pair and the second one, in which each pair nominated another pair. The results were added, and Chelsea & Mbali and Soxx & Tembi received the most nominations, being nominated. As Blue & K2 won HoH, it didn't affect the nominations.

=== Nominations: Results ===
Weeks	Nominated	Evicted
Week 1	No Eviction	Ex & Lebo (Walked)
Week 2	Bongi & Khali (55%), Matthias & Sibu (45%)	Matthias & Sibu
Week 3	Bexx & Soxx (42%), Chelsea & Mbali (37%), Gino & Tiffini (21%)	Gino & Tiffini
Week 4	Eviction Cancelled	Adams, Bexx (Ejected)
Week 5	Ace & Ntombi (45%), Blue & K2 (32%), Chelsea & Mbali (16%), Kay & Pumba (5%), Bongi & Khali (2%)	Bongi & Khali
Week 6	Ace & Ntombi (47.9%), Blue & K2 (34.1%), Chelsea & Mbali (14.3%), Kay & Pumba (3.7%)	Kay & Pumba
Week 7	Chelsea & Mbali (53%), Soxx & Tembi (47%)	Soxx & Tembi
Week 8	Ace & Ntombi (62.06%), Blue & K2 (29.93%), Chelsea & Mbali (8.01%)	Blue & K2, Chelsea & Mbali
