= Big Brother Titans =

Joint edition of South African and Nigerian editions of Big Brother

- Presented by: Ebuka Obi-Uchendu; Lawrence Maleka
- Country of origin: South Africa; Nigeria
- Original language: English
- No. of seasons: 1

Original release
- Network: Mzansi Magic; Mzansi Wethu; Africa Magic; DStv; GOtv
- Release: 15 January – 2 April 2023

Big Brother Titans is the joint South African and Nigerian edition of the Big Brother franchise. The theme for the first season was "Ziyakhala Wahala". The show features housemates from South Africa and Nigeria.

The show premiered on 15 January 2023 on DStv channel 198 and GOtv channel 29 and ended on 2 April 2023. The first season was won by Khosi Twala, while Kanaga Jnr was the runner-up.

Ebuka Obi-Uchendu and Lawrence Maleka were co-hosts of the show, and it was sponsored by Flutterwave, Bamboo and Lotto Star. According to the organizers of the show, MultiChoice, the prize money for the winner of the first season was $100,000 (R1.8 million/₦46 million).

A virtual audition was held to select contestants for the show from 6 to 22 October 2022. Interested contestants were told to record and submit a two-minute video stating why they should appear on the show.

== Housemates ==
On Day 0, 20 contestants entered the house, evenly split by country and by male and female. On Day 4, four more contestants entered the house. Housemates were later put into pairs until Week 7. Each pair would have a male and a female and have both countries represented.

Name	Age on entry	Occupation	Residence/Birthplace	Day entered	Day exited	Status
Makhosazane Khosi Twala	25	Journalist	KwaZulu-Natal/ Johannesburg South Africa	0	77	Winner
Kalu-Anaga Kanaga Jnr Emmanuel Eme	23	Model, aspiring actor	Lagos State/Abia State, Nigeria	0	77	Runner-up
Motsatsi Wendy Tsatsii Madiba	24	Engineering, biotechnology, microbiology student	Pretoria, South Africa	0	77	3rd Place
Yvonne	28	Model, skincare enthusiast, content creator	Lagos State/Akwa Ibom State, Nigeria	0	77	4th Place
Ebubu	28	Actor, model	Anambra State, Nigeria	0	77	5th Place
Ipeleng Rose Selepe	25	Law student, content creator	Gauteng Province/Northwest Province, South Africa	0	77	5th Place
Thabang Mazibuko	21	Sports data analyst	Johannesburg/Soweto, South Africa	0	70	Evicted
Victor Blaqboi Panwal	26	Content creator, filmmaker	Jos, Plateau State, Nigeria	0	70	Evicted
Justin Peters	21	Content creator, photographer	East London, South Africa	0	70	Evicted
Miracle OP	25	Works in pharmaceutical company	Lagos State/Anambra State, Nigeria	4	63	Evicted
Blessing Nana	22	Entrepreneur	Kaduna State, Nigeria	0	63	Evicted
Tebatso Blue Aiva	22	Professional dancer, DJ	Johannesburg/Limpopo Province, South Africa	4	63	Evicted
Nelisa Msila	25	Unknown	Johannesburg/Eastern Cape, South Africa	0	49	Evicted
Yemi Cregx	30	Fashion influencer, content creator, model, actor	Lagos State/Ekiti State, Nigeria	0	49	Evicted
Siyamthanda Juicy Jay Jwacu	24	Semi-professional rugby player	Mthatha, South Africa	0	49	Evicted
Chioma Olivia Okoro	24	Aspiring actress	Imo State, Nigeria	0	49	Evicted
Marvin Achi	28	Chemical engineer, model	Texas, United States of America/Port Harcourt, Rivers State, Nigeria	0	35	Evicted
Yaya Mwanda	30	Plus-size model	Johannesburg/East London, Eastern Cape	0	35	Evicted
Jenni O	24	Health and safety specialist	United States of America/Imo State, Nigeria	0	28	Evicted
Mmeli	24	Content creator, model	Hillbrow, Johannesburg, South Africa	0	28	Evicted
Jaypee	26	Nurse	Lagos State, Nigeria	0	21	Evicted
Lukay	31	Sales executive	KwaZulu-Natal, South Africa	0	21	Evicted
Sandra Essiene	27	Entrepreneur, model, host, former beauty queen	Lagos State, Nigeria	4	14	Evicted
Theo Traw	29	Musician	The Vaal Triangle, South Africa	4	14	Evicted

The launch night (15 January) is marked as Day 0. The day after is Day 1.

=== Pairs ===
Week 2 - Week 7
#	Pair name	Housemates
1	Blaqleng	Blaqboi & Ipeleng
2	Kaniva	Kanaga Jnr & Blue Aiva
3	Royals	Ebubu & Tsatsii
4	Jaykay	Jaypee & Lukay
5	Jenne Li	Jenni O & Mmeli
6	Thabana	Nana & Thabang
7	Yelisa	Yemi Cregx & Nelisa
8	Juvone	Justin & Yvonne
9	Santheo	Sandra & Theo Traw
10	Juiovla	Juicy Jay & Olivia
11	Khosicle	Khosi & Miracle OP
12	Maya	Marvin & Yaya

== Nominations table ==
		Individuals		Pairs						Individuals					Nominations & votes received
		Week 1		Week 2	Week 3	Week 4	Week 5	Week 6	Week 7	Week 8	Week 9	Week 10	Week 11 Final		Nominations & votes received
		Day 1	Day 4	Week 2	Week 3	Week 4	Week 5	Week 6	Week 7	Week 8	Week 9	Week 10	Week 11 Final		Nominations & votes received
Head of House		Mmeli		Blaqleng	Kaniva	Royals	Thabana	Yelisa	Royals	Ipeleng	Blaqboi	Tsatsii	Ipeleng		Nominations & votes received
Head of House		Mmeli		Blaqleng	Kaniva	Royals	Thabana	Yelisa	Royals	Ipeleng	Blaqboi	Tsatsii	Khosi		Nominations & votes received
11	Khosi	~~Jaypee~~; ~~Jenni O~~	No; Voting	Royals; Santheo	Royals; Blaqleng	Jenne Li; Blaqleng	Blaqleng; Maya	~~Royals~~; ~~Juvone~~	Juiovla; Kaniva	No; Voting	Kanaga Jnr; Tsatsii	Justin; Kanaga Jnr	Winner (Day 77)		30
2	Kanaga Jnr	~~Lukay~~; ~~Olivia~~	No; Voting	Jaykay; Juiovla	Khosicle; Jaykay	Khosicle; Thabana	Juvone; Juiovla	~~Juvone~~; ~~Khosicle~~	Khosicle; Juiovla	No; Voting	Khosi; Miracle OP	Thabang; Khosi	Runner-up (Day 77)		16
3	Tsatsii	~~Nana~~; ~~Lukay~~	No; Voting	Santheo; Jaykay	Khosicle; Thabana	Juiovla; Yelisa	Blaqleng; Kaniva	~~Juiovla~~; ~~Juvone~~	Khosicle; Juvone	No; Voting	Nana; Blue Aiva	Khosi; Blaqboi	3rd place (Day 77)		18
8	Yvonne	~~Marvin~~; ~~Tsatsii~~	No; Voting	Royals; Yelisa	Khosicle; Blaqleng	Kaniva; Khosicle	Blaqleng; Royals	~~Royals~~; ~~Kaniva~~	Khosicle; Yelisa	No; Voting	Miracle OP; Thabang	Thabang; Blaqboi	4th place (Day 77)		18
3	Ebubu	~~Justin~~; ~~Nana~~	No; Voting	Santheo; Jaykay	Khosicle; Thabana	Juiovla; Yelisa	Blaqleng; Kaniva	~~Juiovla~~; ~~Juvone~~	Khosicle; Juvone	No; Voting	Miracle OP; Blue Aiva	Thabang; Khosi	5th place (Day 77)		15
1	Ipeleng	~~Jenni O~~; ~~Olivia~~	No; Voting	Juvone; Yelisa	Khosicle; Juvone	Khosicle; Juvone	Yelisa; Juvone	~~Royals~~; ~~Khosicle~~	Juiovla; Yelisa	No; Voting	Kanaga Jnr; Khosi	Khosi; Thabang	5th place (Day 77)		14
6	Thabang	~~Justin~~; ~~Nana~~	No; Voting	Santheo; Juvone	Jaykay; Yelisa	Yelisa; Maya	Maya; Yelisa	~~Khosicle~~; ~~Kaniva~~	Kaniva; Yelisa	No; Voting	Kanaga Jnr; Yvonne	Kanaga Jnr; Yvonne	Evicted (Day 70)		14
1	Blaqboi	~~Yemi Cregx~~; ~~Yaya~~	No; Voting	Juvone; Yelisa	Khosicle; Juvone	Khosicle; Juvone	Yelisa; Juvone	~~Royals~~; ~~Khosicle~~	Juiovla; Yelisa	No; Voting	Miracle OP; Thabang	Justin; Thabang	Evicted (Day 70)		15
8	Justin	~~Nelisa~~; ~~Nana~~	No; Voting	Royals; Yelisa	Khosicle; Blaqleng	Kaniva; Khosicle	Blaqleng; Royals	~~Royals~~; ~~Kaniva~~	Khosicle; Yelisa	No; Voting	Khosi; Tsatsii	Kanaga Jnr; Khosi	Evicted (Day 70)		22
11	Miracle OP	Not in House	No; Voting	Royals; Santheo	Royals; Blaqleng	Jenne Li; Blaqleng	Blaqleng; Maya	~~Royals~~; ~~Juvone~~	Juiovla; Kaniva	No; Voting	Kanaga Jnr; Yvonne	Evicted (Day 63)			26
6	Nana	~~Yemi Cregx~~; ~~Jaypee~~	No; Voting	Santheo; Juvone	Jaykay; Yelisa	Yelisa; Maya	Maya; Yelisa	~~Khosicle~~; ~~Kaniva~~	Kaniva; Yelisa	No; Voting	Miracle OP; Blue Aiva	Evicted (Day 63)			23
2	Blue Aiva	Not in House	No; Voting	Jaykay; Juiovla	Khosicle; Jaykay	Khosicle; Thabana	Juvone; Juiovla	~~Juvone~~; ~~Khosicle~~	Khosicle; Juiovla	No; Voting	Nana; Yvonne	Evicted (Day 63)			17
7	Nelisa	~~Khosi~~; ~~Nana~~	No; Voting	Santheo; Juvone	Jaykay; Blaqleng	Juiovla; Jenne Li	Kaniva; Blaqleng	~~Royals~~; ~~Thabana~~	Juiovla; Juvone	Evicted (Day 49)					11
7	Yemi Cregx	~~Olivia~~; ~~Nana~~	No; Voting	Santheo; Juvone	Jaykay; Blaqleng	Juiovla; Jenne Li	Kaniva; Blaqleng	~~Royals~~; ~~Thabana~~	Juiovla; Juvone	Evicted (Day 49)					17
10	Juicy Jay	~~Nana~~; ~~Justin~~	No; Voting	Thabana; Santheo	Blaqleng; Thabana	Kaniva; Blaqleng	Khosicle; Blaqleng	~~Thabana~~; ~~Royals~~	Blaqleng; Yelisa	Evicted (Day 49)					14
10	Olivia	~~Khosi~~; ~~Yemi Cregx~~	No; Voting	Thabana; Santheo	Blaqleng; Thabana	Kaniva; Blaqleng	Khosicle; Blaqleng	~~Thabana~~; ~~Royals~~	Blaqleng; Yelisa	Evicted (Day 49)					10
12	Marvin	~~Justin~~; ~~Khosi~~	No; Voting	Santheo; Khosicle	Thabana; Blaqleng	Jenne Li; Thabana	Kaniva; Khosicle	Evicted (Day 35)							4
12	Yaya	~~Nana~~; ~~Blaqboi~~	No; Voting	Santheo; Khosicle	Thabana; Blaqleng	Jenne Li; Thabana	Kaniva; Khosicle	Evicted (Day 35)							5
5	Mmeli	~~Nana~~; ~~Kanaga Jnr~~	No; Voting	Santheo; Royals	Yelisa; Khosicle	Khosicle; Yelisa	Evicted (Day 28)								4
5	Jenni O	~~Khosi~~; ~~Tsatsii~~	No; Voting	Santheo; Royals	Yelisa; Khosicle	Khosicle; Yelisa	Evicted (Day 28)								6
4	Jaypee	~~Yemi Cregx~~; ~~Khosi~~	No; Voting	Santheo; Yelisa	Jenne Li; Thabana	Evicted (Day 21)									7
4	Lukay	~~Olivia~~; ~~Justin~~	No; Voting	Santheo; Yelisa	Jenne Li; Thabana	Evicted (Day 21)									7
9	Sandra	Not in House	No; Voting	Khosicle; Thabana	Evicted (Day 14)										8
9	Theo Traw	Not in House	No; Voting	Khosicle; Thabana	Evicted (Day 14)										8
Note		1		2	none			1	3	4	5	6, 7			
Nominated (pre-save and replace)		none		Juvone; Yelisa; Royals; Santheo	Blaqleng; Jaykay; Khosicle; Thabana; Yelisa	Blaqleng; Jenne Li; Juiovla; Kaniva; Khosicle; Thabana; Yelisa	Kaniva; Blaqleng; Khosicle; Juvone; Maya; Yelisa	none	Juiovla; Juvone; Kaniva; Khosicle; Yelisa	none	Blue Aiva; Kanaga Jnr; Khosi; Miracle OP; Nana; Thabang; Tsatsii; Yvonne	Blaqboi; Justin; Kanaga Jnr; Khosi; Thabang; Yvonne	none		
Saved		none		Royals	Yelisa	Blaqleng	Juvone	none	none	none	none				
Against public vote		none		Juiovla; Juvone; Yelisa; Santheo	Blaqleng; Jaykay; Khosicle; Maya; Thabana	Jenne Li; Juiovla; Juvone; Kaniva; Khosicle; Thabana; Yelisa	Kaniva; Blaqleng; Khosicle; Juiovla; Maya; Yelisa	none	Juiovla; Juvone; Kaniva; Khosicle; Royals; Yelisa	none	Blue Aiva; Kanaga Jnr; Khosi; Miracle OP; Nana; Thabang; Tsatsii; Yvonne	Blaqboi; Justin; Kanaga Jnr; Khosi; Thabang; Yvonne	Ebubu; Ipeleng; Kanaga Jnr; Khosi; Tsatsii; Yvonne		
Walked		none		none				none	none	none	none				
Evicted		none		Santheo; 12.06% to save	Jaykay; 7.8% to save	Jenne Li; 4.68% to save	Maya; 5.98% to save	none	Juiovla; 15.10% to save	none	Nana; 3 points to save	Justin; 5 points to save	Ipeleng; 6 points to win	Tsatsii; 12 points to win	
Evicted		none		Santheo; 12.06% to save	Jaykay; 7.8% to save	Jenne Li; 4.68% to save	Maya; 5.98% to save	none	Yelisa; 15.39% to save	none	Miracle OP; 9 points to save	Blaqboi; 5 points to save	Ebubu; 6 points to win	Kanaga Jnr; 14 points to win	
Evicted		none		Santheo; 12.06% to save	Jaykay; 7.8% to save	Jenne Li; 4.68% to save	Maya; 5.98% to save	none	Yelisa; 15.39% to save	none	Blue Aiva; 10 points to save	Thabang; 12 points to save	Yvonne; 9 points to win	Kanaga Jnr; 14 points to win	
Survived		none		Juvone; 22.0% to save	Blaqleng; 12.68% to save	Juiovla; 8.87% to save	Blaqleng; 7.61% to save	none	Juvone; 15.43% to save	none	Kanaga Jnr; 14 points to save	Yvonne; 12 points to save	Khosi; 16 points to win		
Survived		none		Juiovla; 26.74% to save	Maya; 19.16% to save	Thabana; 12.43% to save	Yelisa; 15.03% to save	none	Royals; 16.33% to save	none	Yvonne; 17 points to save	Khosi; 14 points to save	Khosi; 16 points to win		
Survived		none		Yelisa; 39.2% to save	Thabana; 24.80% to save	Yelisa; 12.60% to save	Juiovla; 20.38% to save	none	Kanaiva; 16.84% to save	none	Thabang; 17 points to save	Kanaga jnr 16 points to save	Khosi; 16 points to win		
Survived		none		Yelisa; 39.2% to save	Khosicle; 35.56% to save	Juvone; 16.35% to save	Kanaiva; 22.79% to save	none	Khosicle; 20.91% to save	none	Tsatsii; 18 points to save	Kanaga jnr 16 points to save	Khosi; 16 points to win		
Survived		none		Yelisa; 39.2% to save	Khosicle; 35.56% to save	Kanaiva; 18.87% to save	Khosicle; 28.25% to save	none	Khosicle; 20.91% to save	none	Khosi; 20 points to save	Kanaga jnr 16 points to save	Khosi; 16 points to win		
Survived		none		Yelisa; 39.2% to save	Khosicle; 35.56% to save	Khosicle; 26.20% to save	Khosicle; 28.25% to save	none	Khosicle; 20.91% to save	none	Khosi; 20 points to save	Kanaga jnr 16 points to save	Khosi; 16 points to win		

=== Notes ===
^Note 1 : All nominations for weeks 1 and 6 were fake.

^Note 2 : All nominations starting from week 2 were for housemate pairs by pairs.

^Note 3 : In week 7, Tsatsii disobeyed Big Brother's rules by discussing nominations with other housemates other than her partner. As punishment, Big Brother revoked the Royals' Head of House immunity and placed them up for eviction.

^Note 4 : In week 8, Big Brother announced that the pairs had been dissolved and all housemates would go back to competing as individuals until the finale. Ipeleng won the Super Veto Power Holder, guaranteeing her a spot in the finale, Head of House for the week, and the power to choose a housemate to take to the finale.

^Note 5 : In week 9, there was no save and replace due to the Super Veto Power won by Ipeleng in week 8. She chose to take Ebubu to the finale.

^Note 6 : In weeks 10 and 11, the penultimate and final weeks, there was no save and replace.

^Note 7 : In week 10, both Thabang and Yvonne received 12 points to save and the tie was broken by the Rest of Africa vote in which Yvonne received more votes than Thabang.
