= Thandeka Tshabalala =

South African television personality (born 1995)

- Tshabalala in 2026
- Born: Thandeka Tshabalala; 1995 (age 30–31); Durban, KwaZulu Natal, South Africa
- Occupations: Television personality; bookkeeper
- Years active: 2026–present

Thandeka Tshabalala (born 1995) is a South African reality television personality and bookkeeper. She is best known as the 1st Runner-up of Big Brother Mzansi season 6.

== Career ==
Before entering the Big Brother Mzansi house, Tshabalala worked as an international bookkeeper based in Italy. She rose to national prominence after participating in the Big Brother Mzansi season 6 (Bazozwa) in January2026, where she became one of the most talked about housemates due to her outspoken personality and strong presence in the house. On the 9th week, she was inducted in the finale with Liema and Trixie where they became the first 3 housemates to be inducted into the finals. She finished the competition as the 1st Runner-up with 29,97%, where Liema Pantsi was crowned the winner.

== Public image ==
Tshabalala was often described as bold, unapologetic and highly visible during the Big Brother Mzansi season 6. She earned nickname of the "Bazozwa Queen" among fans.

== Controversy ==
Tshabalala was accused of saying to Ilano that she has only been a woman for two minutes and the show has eventually gave her and fellow housemate Ramona strike. The public signed a petition for her and Ramona to be disqualified from the show.

Tshabalala was also involved in a widely reported rivalry with Liema Pantsi during the show. Following the finale, she publicly questioned the fairness of the results, alleging production bias which generated significant public and media debate.

== Filmography ==
| Year | Title | Role | Notes |
|---|---|---|---|
| 2026 | Big Brother Mzansi season 6 | Contestant | 1st runner-up |
