= Big Brother Mzansi season 3 =

Big Brother Mzansi
- Season 3
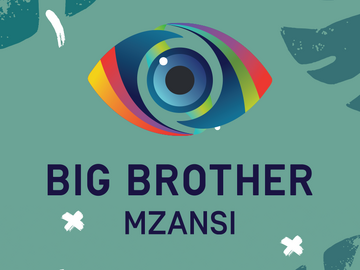
- Presented by: Lawrence Maleka
- No. of days: 71
- No. of housemates: 20
- Winner: Michelle Dimpho "Mphowabadimo" Mvundla
- Runner-up: Gashwen Brandon "Gash1" Mthombeni

Release
- Original network: Mzansi Magic and M-Net; DStv (live)
- Original release: 23 January – 3 April 2022

Season chronology
- ← Previous; Season 2 Next → Season 4

Big Brother Mzansi: Beke Le Beke (also known as Big Brother Mzansi 3 or Big Brother South Africa 5) is the third season of the South African Big Brother reality television reboot series produced by Banijay and Red Pepper Pictures for M-Net and Mzansi Magic. It returned after a six-year hiatus and marked 20 years since the Big Brother brand launched in South Africa.

The Sponsor of the show for this season was Lottostar. While the associative sponsor was Johnnie Walker

The show premiered on 23 January 2022 on Mzansi Magic and DStv with 24 contestants initially and a new host, Lawrence Maleka. A week later, two more contestants were introduced to the house.

On 3 April, Mphowabadimo was declared the winner of the third season of Big Brother Mzansi and received R2 million, while Gash1 was the runner-up.

== Housemates ==
The first evening (23 January) introduced 18 housemates, equally split between male and female. After only three days in the house, QV decided to withdraw from the competition for mental health reasons. On 30 January, instead of an eviction, Vyno and Nthabii were added to the house.

Housemates	Age on entry	Occupation	Residence/Hometown	Day entered	Day exited	Status
Michelle Dimpho "Mphowabadimo" Mvundla	27	Sangoma	Daveyton	0	70	Winner
Gashwen Brandon "Gash1" Mthombeni	28	Fashion Designer, entrepreneur	Pretoria	0	70	Runner-up
Themba Karabo Mabaso	30	Tattoo Artist	Johannesburg	0	70	3rd place
Libo Njomba	32	Salesperson, Personal trainer, IT Graduate	King William's Town	0	70	4th place
Thulani "Tulz" Madala	28	Radio DJ, Voice-over Artist, actor	East London	0	70	5th place
Thato Mokoena	28	Accountant, Content Creator, actress	Johannesburg	0	63	Evicted
Ukho "Sis Tamara" Samela	25	Film Student	Queenstown	0	63	Evicted
Gugu Refiloe "Terry" Bonga	26	Make-up Artist, Adult Content Creator	Johannesburg	0	63	Evicted
Naledi "Nale" Mogadime	24	Model, actress	Pretoria	0	49	Evicted
Thobeka "Venus" Mtshali	25	Aspiring Musician, Bartender	Durban	0	49	Evicted
Nthabiseng "Nthabii" Mothutsi	27	Student Athlete	Polokwane	8	42	Evicted
Bongani "Vyno" Sikhukhula	28	Musician	Pretoria	8	35	Evicted
Norman Nhlapo	24	Daycare Worker	Pretoria	0	35	Evicted
Yolanda "Yoli" Glover	30	Performing Arts Teacher, Psychology Student	Durban	0	35	Evicted
Luthando "B.U" Mthembu	31	Aspiring Musician	Durban	0	28	Evicted
Adindu "Zino" Asuzu	21	Digital Marketing Student	Johannesburg	0	28	Evicted
Thando "Acacia" Mati (Mcopela)	30	Model	Soweto	0	21	Evicted
Rethabile "Dinkybliss" Potsane	29	Business Woman	Welkom	0	14	Evicted
Mvelo Ntuli	28	Marketing Graduate	Pietermaritzburg	0	14	Evicted
Keamogetswe "QV" Mothlale	24	Marketing Communications Graduate	Soweto	0	3	Walked

The launch night is marked as Day 0. The day after is Day 1.

== Voting history and Nominations ==
	Week 1	Week 2	Week 3	Week 4	Week 5	Week 6	Week 7	Week 8	Week 9	Week 10 Final	Nominations & votes received
Head of House	Tulz	Terry	Sis; Tamara	Gash1	Sis; Tamara	Tulz	Libo	Themba		Tulz	Nominations & votes received
Deputy Head of House	Libo	Themba	Yoli	Nthabii	Venus	Libo	Themba	Libo	Mphowabadimo		Nominations & votes received
Veto Power Holder	none	Head of House						Themba	none		Nominations & votes received
Mphowabadimo	QV; Venus	Did Not Vote	Did Not Vote	Did Not Vote	Yoli; Tulz; Norman	Nale; Sis Tamara	Tulz; Terry	No Voting	No Voting	Winner (Day 70)	14
Gash1	B.U; Themba	Did Not Vote	Did Not Vote	B.U; Libo; Nale; Venus	Terry; Nthabii; Mphowabadimo	Terry; Mphowabadimo	Nale; Venus	No Voting	No Voting	Runner-up (Day 70)	17
Themba	Gash1; Sis; Tamara	Gash1; Mvelo; Acacia; Dinkybliss	Did Not Vote	Did Not Vote	Yoli; Tulz; Terry	Nale; Sis; Tamara	Thato; Sis; Tamara	No Voting	No Voting	3rd place (Day 70)	10
Libo	QV; Dinkybliss	'Did Not Vote	Did Not Vote	Did Not Vote	Yoli; Gash1; Themba	Nale; Mphowabadimo	Gash1; Mphowabadimo	No Voting	No Voting	4th place (Day 70)	3
Tulz	Yoli; Acacia	Did Not Vote	Did Not Vote	Did Not Vote	Yoli; Themba; Norman	Nthabii; Mphowabadimo	Thato; Mphowabadimo	No Voting	No Voting	5th place (Day 70)	9
Thato	Acacia; Mphowabadimo	Did Not Vote	Did Not Vote	Did Not Vote	Libo; Nthabii; Mphowabadimo	Nale; Terry	Tulz; Venus	No Voting	No Voting	Evicted (Day 63)	8
Sis Tamara	Mvelo; Norman	Did Not Vote	Nale; Zino; Acacia; Mphowabadimo	Did Not Vote	Vyno; Terry; Themba	Nale; Gash1	Thato; Venus	No Voting	No Voting	Evicted (Day 63)	5
Terry	QV; Themba	Mvelo; Gash1; Dinkybliss; Mphowabadimo	Did Not Vote	Did Not Vote	Yoli; Gash1; Norman	Nthabii; Mphowabadimo	Gash1; Thato	No Voting	No Voting	Evicted (Day 63)	7
Nale	QV; Mvelo	Did Not Vote	Did Not Vote	Did Not Vote	Yoli; Gash1; Themba	Gash1; Themba	Tulz; Gash1	Evicted (Day 49)			9
Venus	Norman; Mphowabadimo	Did Not Vote	Did Not Vote	Did Not Vote	Thato; Gash1; Nthabii	Nthabii; Mphowabadimo	Tulz; Thato	Evicted (Day 49)			6
Nthabii	Not in House	Exempt	Did Not Vote	B.U; Vyno; Thato; Norman	Gash1; Terry; Norman	Nale; Gash1	Evicted (Day 42)				9
Vyno	Not in House	Exempt	Did Not Vote	Did Not Vote	Yoli; Gash1; Norman	Evicted (Day 35)					3
Norman	Mvelo; Themba	Did Not Vote	Did Not Vote	Did Not Vote	Tulz; Vyno; Nthabii	Evicted (Day 35)					7
Yoli	Gash1; Venus	Did Not Vote	Tulz; Nthabii; Acacia; Themba	Did Not Vote	Tulz; Nthabii; Mphowabadimo	Evicted (Day 35)					9
B.U	QV; Gash1	Did Not Vote	Did Not Vote	Did Not Vote	Evicted (Day 28)						3
Zino	Yoli; Dinkybliss	Did Not Vote	Did Not Vote	Did Not Vote	Evicted (Day 28)						1
Acacia	Thato; Norman	Did Not Vote	Did Not Vote	Evicted (Day 21)							6
Dinkybliss	Nale; Acacia	Did Not Vote	Evicted (Day 14)								2
Mvelo	Themba; Sis Tamara	Did Not Vote	Evicted (Day 14)								2
QV	Libo; Thato	Walked (Day 3)									5
Note	1	2	3	4	5, 6	none		7	8	none	
Nominated (pre-save and replace)	No Voting	Acacia; Dinkybliss; Gash1; Mphowabadimo; Mvelo	Acacia; Mphowabadimo; Nale; Nthabii; Themba; Tulz; Zino	B.U; Libo; Nale; Norman; Thato; Venus; Vyno	Gash1; Norman; Nthabii; Terry; Themba; Tulz; Yoli	Gash1; Mphowabadimo; Nale; Nthabii; Sis Tamara; Terry	Gash1; Mphowabadimo; Thato; Tulz; Venus	No Voting	No Voting		
Saved	No Voting	Acacia	Tulz	Norman	Tulz	Terry	Tulz	No Voting	No Voting		
Against public vote	No Voting	Dinkybliss; Gash1; Mphowabadimo; Mvelo; Norman	Acacia; Mphowabadimo; Nale; Nthabii; Themba; Vyno; Zino	B.U; Libo; Nale; Thato; Venus; Vyno; Zino	Gash1; Norman; Nthabii; Terry; Themba; Vyno; Yoli	Gash1; Mphowabadimo; Nale; Nthabii; Sis Tamara; Thato	Gash1; Mphowabadimo; Nale; Thato; Venus	No Voting	Gash1; Mphowabadimo; Sis Tamara; Terry; Thato	Gash1; Mphowabadimo; Themba; Libo; Tulz	
Walked	QV	none									
Ejected	none	none									
Evicted	No Eviction	Mvelo; 7.45% to save Dinkybliss; 12.12% to save	Acacia	Zino; B.U	Yoli; Norman; Vyno	Nthabii	Venus; Nale	No Eviction	Terry; Sis Tamara; Thato	Tulz; Libo; Themba; Gash1	
Survived	No Eviction	Norman; 21.67% to save Gash1; 22.40% to save Mphowabadimo; 36.35% to save	Zino; Vyno; Nthabii; Nale; Themba; Mphowabadimo	Vyno; Venus; Libo; Nale; Thato	Nthabii; Terry; Themba; Gash1	Nale; Sis Tamara; Thato; Gash1; Mphowabadimo	Thato; Gash1; Mphowabadimo	No Eviction	Gash1; Mphowabadimo	Mphowabadimo	

1. In week 1, all housemates made their eviction nominations. On eviction night, it was revealed that all housemates were actually up for eviction, before the eviction for that week was cancelled.
2. In week 2 and 3, only the HoH and deputy HoH were allowed to nominate housemates for possible eviction. The HoH had to use their veto power to replace one housemate from those nominated by the deputy HoH, with a non-nominated housemate.
3. In week 3, under Sis Tamara and Yoli's leadership, the housemates won their first 100% wager.
4. For the third week in a row, only the HoH and deputy HoH were allowed to nominate, with HoH once again having the privilege to save and replace.
5. Week 5 was the first week that all housemates had the opportunity to nominate other housemates for possible eviction. Both the HoH and deputy HoH were immune from nomination while the HoH had to perform a save and replace in front of all the housemates.
6. The Conspiracy Corner was introduced, where housemates could discuss who they want to nominate.
7. In week 8, instead of nominations, the Ultimate Veto Power Games were played, where the winning housemate and two other housemates of their choosing would be guaranteed a spot in the finale. The Conspiracy Corner was also removed.
8. In week 9, all housemates except for the Ultimate Veto Power Holder and two housemates of their choosing were up for eviction.

== Nomination table ==
Weeks	Nominated	Evicted
Week 1	Fake Nominations	QV (Walked)
Week 2	Dinkybliss, Gash1, Mphowabadimo, Mvelo & Norman	Dinkybliss & Mvelo
Week 3	Acacia, Mphowabadimo, Nale, Nthabii, Themba, Vyno & Zino	Acacia
Week 4	B.U, Libo, Nale, Thato, Venus, Vyno & Zino	B.U & Zino
Week 5	Gash1, Norman, Nthabii, Terry, Themba, Vyno & Yoli	Norman, Vyno & Yoli
Week 6	Gash1, Mphowabadimo, Nale, Nthabii, Sis Tamara & Thato	Nthabii
Week 7	Gash1, Mphowabadimo, Nale, Thato & Venus	Nale & Venus
Week 8	No Nominations	No Eviction
Week 9	Gash1, Mphowabadimo, Sis Tamara, Terry & Thato	Sis Tamara, Terry & Thato
Week 10	Gash1, Libo, Mphowabadimo, Themba & Tulz	Gash1, Libo, Themba & Tulz
