= Bells N Whistles =

Studio album by Liema Pantsi
- Released: 3 December 2024
- Recorded: 2024
- Genres: Amapiano; Afrobeats; Afro House; R&B
- Length: 32:09
- Label: Africa Unite Records

Singles from Bells N Whistles
- 1. "Let Me Be" Released: 26 June 2024; 2. "Amahloni" Released: 12 November 2024

Bells N Whistles is the debut studio album by a South African singer and songwriter Liema Pantsi released on 3 December 2024 through Africa Unite Records. The album blends a mix of RnB, Afrobeats, Amapiano and Afropop. The album has single "Let Me Be" that has won Songwriter of the Year award from Basadi in Music Awards in 2025.

== Background and release ==
The album explores deep personal themes of love, identity, resilience, and utilized a rich blend of RnB, Afrobeats, Amapiano, and Afro House, aiming for a sound she described as everything and was released on 3 December 2024 by African Unite Records. It is produced under Africa Unite Records with 9 track project features professional collaborations with artists such as Cici, Thabsie, Nhlanhla Dube, Takue, Enhle Mlambo, Ticozet, Millionn and Tebza DA Guitar, which helped ground her reality show fame in musical credibility.

== Live performances ==
Liema Pantsi made her first performance in January 2025 in Big Brother Mzansi season 5 two singles include "Impumelelo" and "Let Me Be". In March 2025, she joined Cici on Love Tour in Eastern Cape. She also performed at 2025 Basadi in Music Awards and South African Social Media Awards in late 2025.

== Track listing ==
Bells N Whistles track listing
No.	Title	Writer(s)	Producer(s)	Length
1.	"No Title" (featuring Tebogo de Guitar)	Liyema Pantsi; Phikolomzi Bam; Asamkele Maqasho	Asamkele; Anderson Phiri	3.01
2.	"Amahloni" (Nhlanhla Dube featuring Enhle Mlambo, Ticozet)	Pantsi; Bam; Licebo Silinyana; Sisanda Minenhle Nokwanda Mlambo	Bam; Silinyana	4.02
3.	"Captured My Soul"	Pantsi; Bam; Phiri	Phiri	2.52
4.	"Intentions"	Pantsi; Bam; Achokah	Phiri	3.03
5.	"Just Friends" (Takue)	Bam; Phiri; Takudwa Joshua Ncube	Bam	2.43
6.	"Remember" (featuring Cici)	Pantsi; Bam; Phiri; Licebo Silinyana; Busisiwe Twala	Silinyana; Lucky Magagula	4.52
7.	"You" (featuring Millionn)	Pantsi; Bam; Phiri; Milawande Pantsi	Milawande Pantsi; Phiri	3.26
8.	"High" (featuring Thabsie)	Pantsi; Bathabise Biyela; Phiri; Bam	Bam; Phiri	2.40
9.	"Love Story" (featuring: Sam Kotkot; Mazet; Soul Kulture)	Pantsi; Bam; Maqasho; Zusipho Mchunu; Msekeli Velaphi	Maqasho; Phiri	5.28
10.	"Let Me Be"	Pantsi; Bam; Phiri; Joe Phiri	Phiri	2.44
Total length:				32:09

== Reception ==
Bells N Whistles has marked by significant industry accolades and strong fan support. Released in late 2024 and win Songwriter of the Year for "Let Me Be" single track and Collaboration of the Year with Cici at the 2025 Basadi in Music Awards.
