= Liema Pantsi =

South African singer and influencer (born 2002)

- Born: Liyema Pantsi; 25 October 2001 (age 25); Qonce, Eastern Cape, South Africa
- Other names: Liema; Paradise
- Occupations: Singer-songwriter; influencer; television personality
- Years active: 2020–present
- Height: 1.65 m (5 ft 5 in)

Liyema "Liema" Pantsi (born 25 October 2001) is a South African singer-songwriter, influencer and television personality. She is best known as the undisputed "Queen of S'ya Mosha and Bazozwa". She rose to fame after being bribed a cash prize on Big Brother Mzansi season 4 and was crowned the winner of Big Brother Mzansi season 6.

Pantsi made her first television performance in Idols South Africa season 16 in 2020 where she won Golden Ticket and released her debut song in 2022 "Ain't Worth It". In 2024, she released her debut studio album Bells N Whistles and won 2 Basadi in Music Awards in 2025 for Songwriter of the Year and Best Collaboration of the Year for "Impumelelo" song with Cici with the most nominations, five in total.

== Early life ==
Liyema Pantsi was born on 25 October 2002 in Qonce, Eastern Cape, South Africa. She grew up in a supportive Christian household as the eldest of her siblings. Her passion for performing surfaced early where she began singing for classmates at age four and joined a music group at 12 years old. She balanced her artistic ambitions with everyday life, working as a bartender and even reaching the audition stages of Idols South Africa at the age of 19 and received the goldern ticket after she impressed all the judges, including guest judge, Cassper Nyovest.

== Career ==
=== 2020–2025: Career beginnings, breakthrough with Big Brother Mzansi season 4 and Bells N Whistles ===
Pantsi made her first television debut on Idols South Africa season 16 in 2020 where she won a Golden Ticket on the first week Wooden Mic and released her debut single "Ain't Worth It" in 2022. In January 2024, she joined Big Brother Mzansi season 4 (S'ya Mosha) as a housemate and bribed a cash prize of R250 000 on the 9th week. The same year after the show, she released three hit single "Let Me Be", "Amahloni" and "Impumelelo" with Cici and went viral on social media platforms. In late 2024, she released her debut album Bells N Whistles and won two awards at the South African Social Media Awards in terms of recognition for being the most influential television personality and content creator in South Africa.

In 2025, Pantsi made her first performance in her music career where she performed at Big Brother Mzansi season 5. She won 2 awards at the 2025 Basadi in Music Awards for Collaboration of the Year with Cici for "Impumelelo" single and Songwriter of the Year for "Let Me Be" single in August, and also performed that night at the awards ceremony. She has been announced as part of the panel of judges for the 2025 South African Social Media Awards. In August, she was featured in DJ Zinhle album namely Zee Nation Volume 1, and released a track "Hlala Nami" with Murdah Bongz and Mthunzi. By late 2025, she joined Cici on her Love Tour in Eastern Cape. In November, she released a single track "Funa Wena" with De Mogul SA.

=== 2026–present: Big Brother Mzansi season 6 ===
In January 2026, Pantsi returned as one of the four "redemption housemates" includes Bravo B, Mmeli and Dube in the Big Brother Mzansi season 6 (Bazozwa). She was voted back into the house by the public for a second chance for the grand prize. On week 9, she was inducted in the finale with Thandeka and Trixie where they became the first 3 housemates to be inducted to the final. On 22 March 2026, she was crowned the winner of the Big Brother Mzansi season 6 with 33,84%, while Thandeka ended up as the Runner Up. She was the owner of the theme song "Bazozwa!" of the Big Brother Mzansi season 6 with Cici and King TK, which was released while she was in the show. In April, she teased a new unreleased track with a rapper and songwriter Usimamane.

In May, Pantsi was featured on Malawian Afropop artist Onesimus's single "Someone to Love" debuting number 1 on South African iTunes on the release date. On 5 June 2026, she released the pop rap single track "Lose Control" with Usimamane. Her recent single track "Lose Control" received No 1 spot in the South African iTunes in one week for the second time in the chat. In June, she received a nomination for Dance Music Artist of the Year from 2026 Basadi in Music Awards, shared with DJ Zinhle.

== Artistry ==
Pantsi's musical genres have been described as Amapiano fusion, R&B, Afrobeats, Neo soul and Afro Pop.

== Other ventures ==
=== Business ===
Pantsi founded her beauty line LeeNuMe Beauty for fragrances in 2020.

=== Endorsements ===
In late 2025, Pantsi was announced as a brand ambassador for the Honor X7d smartphone brand with DJ Tira, Naledi Aphiwe and other influencers.

=== Acting ===
In October 2025, she appeared in a Netflix popular television series Bad Influencer as a recurring cast.

== Public image ==
Liema Pantsi is a musical artist whose public image is defined by her "main character" presence from reality television to award-winning musician and social media influencer. She is popular with her dedicated fanbase, nicknamed "Lillies". She is perceived as a strategic and resilient figure, notably for her exit from Big Brother Mzansi season 4 in 2024 with a cash prize and her 2026 return to the franchise in the Big Brother Mzansi season 6. Her reputation is further bolstered by professional accolades, including Songwriter of the Year at the 2025 Basadi in Music Awards and recognition as one of the Best Social Media Influencer in South Africa. She is the only undisputed "Queen of S'ya Mosha and Bazozwa" Big Brother Mzansi show for season 4 and 6.

On 10 April 2026, Pantsi hosted an event "Liema's homecoming" after being crowned the winner of show and went viral on social media platforms.

== Controversy ==
The controversy centers on a popular reality television personality Somizi Mhlongo high-profile support for Pantsi during the 2026 season of Big Brother Mzansi, which reached a point when he publicly pledged to give her R2 million if she is not winning the Big Brother Mzansi season 6 television show. This move sparked backlash on social media, where critics labeled him a "deadbeat father" and accused him not supporting his only daughter Bahumi Madisakwane, reportedly struggles financially. The situation became more complex when the day Pantsi chose to exit the competition early for a guaranteed R250 000 "Fate Room" cash prize during Big Brother Mzansi season 4 in 2024.

Pantsi was also involved in a widely reported rivalry with Thandeka Tshabalala during the show calling Thandeka's boyfriend, Mmeli a handbag. Following the finale after she was crowned the winner of the season, her fellow Runner-up Thandeka publicly questioned the fairness of the results, saying she is the only "Queen of Bazozwa".

== Discography ==
Liema Pantsi discography
- Studio albums: 1
- Singles: 7

=== Studio albums ===
List of studio albums, with selected details and chart positions
Title	Album details
Bells N Whistles	Released: 3 December 2024; Label: Africa Unite Records; Format: Digital download, streaming

=== Singles ===
==== As lead artist ====
Title	Year	Album
"Ain't Worth It"	2022	Non-album single
"Impumelelo" (with Cici)	2024	Bells N Whistles
"Let Me Be"	2024	Bells N Whistles
"Amahloni"	2024	Bells N Whistles
"Bazozwa!" (with KingKT and Cici)	2026	Big Brother Mzansi season 6
"Lose Control" (with Usimamane)	2026	Non-album single
"Where Did It Begin" (with Sam Kotkot & ZeeBeatsA)	2026	Non-album single
"—" denotes a recording that did not chart in that territory.

==== As featured artist ====
List of singles as featured artist, with year released and album name
Title	Year	Album
"Home" (Nosipho featuring Cici and Liema Pantsi)	2024	Mthandazo
"The Honour" (Majorsteez featuring Liema Pantsi and PinkFur)	2025	Streetwise 2

== Filmography ==
Year	Title	Role	Notes
2020	Idols South Africa	Herself	Theatre Week: Group Rounds, Season 16
2024	Big Brother Mzansi season 4	Contestant	Bribed, Week 9
2025	Bad Influencer	Herself	Recurring role, Season 1
2025	Big Brother Mzansi Reunion	Herself	Part 1
2026	Big Brother Mzansi season 6	Contestant	Winner

== Awards and nominations ==
List of awards and nominations for Liema Pantsi
Association	Year	Category	Nominated works	Result	Ref.
South African Social Media Awards	2024	Beauty Influencer of the Year	Herself	Won	
South African Social Media Awards	2024	Popular Hashtag on Social Media	"#LiemaPantsi"	Won	
South African Social Media Awards	2024	Dominance of the Year	Herself	Nominated	
South African Social Media Awards	2026	Beauty Influencer of the Year	Herself	Pending	
South African Social Media Awards	2026	Dominance of the Year	Herself	Pending	
South African Social Media Awards	2026	Popular Hashtag on Social Media	"#LiemaPantsi"	Pending	
Basadi in Music Awards	2025	Collaboration of the Year	"Impumelelo" with Cici	Won	
Basadi in Music Awards	2025	Songwriter of the Year	"Let Me Be"	Won	
Basadi in Music Awards	2025	Music Video of the Year	"Let Me Be"	Nominated	
Basadi in Music Awards	2025	Newcomer of the Year	Herself	Nominated	
Basadi in Music Awards	2025	Collaboration of the Year	"Home" with Nosipho and Cici	Nominated	
Basadi in Music Awards	2026	Dance Music Artist of the Year	Herself with DJ Zinhle	Nominated	

== Tours ==
Supporting

- Cici – Love Tour (2025)

Awards and achievements
Preceded by Sweet Guluva	Big Brother Mzansi winner 2026	Succeeded by Incumbent
