= Big Brother Mzansi season 4 =

Big Brother Mzansi
- Season 4
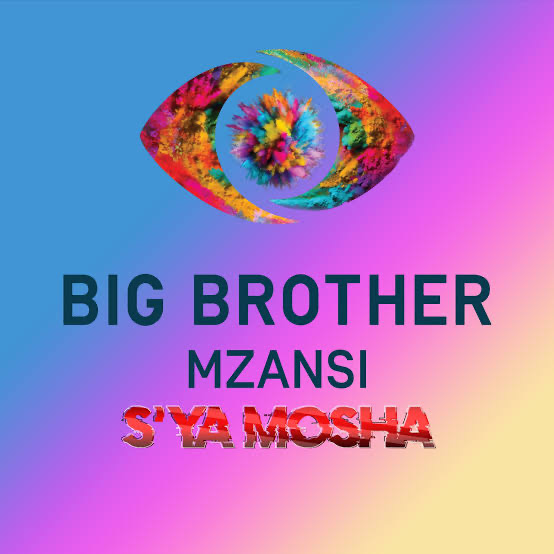
- Presented by: Lawrence Maleka
- No. of days: 71
- No. of housemates: 23
- Winner: McJunior
- Runner-up: Makhekhe

Release
- Original network: Mzansi Magic; DStv/GOtv (live)
- Original release: 21 January – 31 March 2024

Season chronology
- ← Previous; Season 3 Next → Season 5

Big Brother Mzansi: S'ya Mosha (also known as Big Brother Mzansi 4 or Big Brother South Africa 6) was the fourth season of the South African Big Brother reality television reboot series produced by Banijay and Red Pepper Pictures for M-Net and Mzansi Magic. It premiered on 21 January 2024 on DStv channel 198.

LottoStar returned as the headline sponsor of the show, while the associate sponsors were Captain Morgan, Unilever Home Care Essentials and Robertsons Spices.

== Housemates ==
On 21 January 2024, 23 housemates entered the house, including Neo, Taki, and Fahima brought on to secretly disrupt the 20 competing housemates.

Housemates	Age on entry	Occupation	Residence/Hometown	Day entered	Day exited	Status
Siphephelo "McJunior" Zondi	25	Aspiring writer and creative	Durban	0	71	Winner
Tshepo "Makhekhe" Tau	27	Unemployed	Katlehong, Ekurhuleni	0	71	Runner-up
Zintle "Zee" Mofokeng	25	Club hostess	Vaal Triangle, Gauteng	0	71	3rd place
Sinaye Kotobe	24	Self-employed	Qonce, Eastern Cape	0	71	4th place
Harriet "Mpumi" Mthimunye	23	Nightclub MC	Ga-Rankuwa, Gauteng	0	71	5th place
Sabelo "Papaghost" Ncube	36	Music producer	Johannesburg, Gauteng	0	71	6th place
Wilfred "Willy" Thathane	24	Intern	Ga-Rankuwa, Gauteng	0	64	Evicted
Liyema "Liema" Pantsi	22	Student and bartender	Qonce, Eastern Cape	0	58	Bribed
Muthusiemang "Young Pappi" Bika	22	Student and entrepreneur	Kimberley, Northern Cape	0	57	Evicted
Eulanda "Yolanda" Monyai	32	Financial Advisor and model	Limpopo	0	57	Ejected
Lerato Modise	30	Entrepreneur	Free State	0	50	Evicted
Mfanele "Jareed" Nduku	24	Structural and mechanical designer	Pretoria, Gauteng	0	50	Evicted
Elsie "Els" Sese	23	Hairdresser	Vaal Triangle, Gauteng	0	50	Evicted
Mishack "Mich" Mazibuko	23	Student and content creator	Midrand/Mpumalanga	0	43	Evicted
Takalani "Taki" Muthige	27	Entertainer	Limpopo	0	43	Evicted
Ichumile "Meelay" Nozibele	26	Makeup artist	East London, Eastern Cape	0	43	Evicted
Chuene "Chuenzaaa" Kaapu	24	Marketing manager	Limpopo	0	43	Evicted
Palesa "Pale" Motanyane	30	Business development manager	Soweto, Gauteng	0	29	Evicted
Neo Sibiya	21	Content creator and fitness coach	Mpumalanga	0	22	Rated out
Alfredoh "Fahima" Matsingwane	26	Musician	Pretoria, Gauteng	0	22	Rated out
Siphosethu "Sammy M" Mxunyelwa	22	Goldsmith	Qonce, Eastern Cape	0	15	Evicted
Mbali "Mali" Miya	25	Bolt driver and club hostess	Thembisa, Ekurhuleni	0	8	Evicted
Lindokuhle "Bravo B" Nsele	26	Food vendor	Nongoma, KwaZulu-Natal	0	4	Ejected

The launch night (21 January) is marked as Day 0. The day after is Day 1.

== Voting history & Nominations ==
	Week 1	Week 2	Week 3	Week 4	Week 5	Week 6	Week 7	Week 8	Week 9	Week 10 Final	Nominations & votes received
Head of House	Mich	Neo	McJunior	McJunior	Taki	Willy	Mpumi	Papaghost	Papaghost	Zee	Nominations & votes received
McJunior	Sinaye; Papaghost	Willy; Papaghost	~~Lerato Modise~~; ~~Young Pappi~~	Els; Papaghost	~~Els~~; ~~Young Pappi~~	Papaghost; Lerato Modise	Willy; Makhekhe	Young Pappi; Lerato Modise	Mpumi; Willy	Winner (Day 70)	18
Makhekhe	Sinaye; Yolanda	Liema; Sinaye	~~Pale~~; ~~Taki~~	Els; Mich	~~Els~~; ~~Jareed~~	Sinaye; Jareed	Sinaye; Jareed	Zee; Young Pappi	Willy; Mpumi	Runner-Up (Day 70)	14
Zee	Mali; McJunior	Yolanda; Papaghost	~~Fahima~~; ~~Yolanda~~	Liema; Yolanda	~~Yolanda~~; ~~Makhekhe~~	Meelay; Yolanda	Jareed; Liema	Mpumi; Sinaye	Liema; Makhekhe	3rd Place (Day 70)	6
Sinaye	Yolanda; McJunior	Makhekhe; McJunior	~~Papaghost~~; ~~Meelay~~	Mich; Papaghost	~~Mich~~; ~~Makhekhe~~	Mich; Makhekhe	Papaghost; Lerato Modise	Mpumi; Lerato Modise	Mpumi; Makhekhe	4th Place (Day 70)	11
Mpumi	Els; Zee	Liema; Meelay	~~Yolanda~~; ~~Papaghost~~	Liema; Yolanda	~~Liema~~; ~~Meelay~~	Liema; Yolanda	Jareed; Lerato Modise	Liema; Young Pappi	Liema; Sinaye	5th Place (Day 70)	14
Papaghost	Pale; Yolanda	Sammy_M; Yolanda	~~Yolanda~~; ~~Mich~~	Pale; Taki	Fake; Eviction (Day 28)	Sinaye; McJunior	Willy; McJunior	Sinaye; McJunior	Willy; McJunior	6th Place (Day 70)	13
Willy	Els; Taki	Pale; McJunior	~~Papaghost~~; ~~Yolanda~~	Pale; Yolanda	~~Liema~~; ~~Yolanda~~	Yolanda; Makhekhe	Yolanda; Lerato Modise	Liema; Yolanda	Liema; McJunior	Evicted (Day 63)	14
Liema	Papaghost; Lerato Modise	Mpumi; Fahima	~~Meelay~~; ~~Els~~	Pale; Mpumi	~~Meelay~~; ~~Young Pappi~~	Els; Mpumi	Els; Willy	Zee; Willy	Zee; Mpumi	Bribed (Day 57)	12
Young Pappi	Mali; McJunior	Sammy_M; McJunior	~~Yolanda~~; ~~Meelay~~	Taki; Sinaye	~~McJunior~~; ~~Liema~~	Taki; McJunior	Els; Liema	Willy; Mpumi	Evicted (Day 56)		4
Yolanda	Makhekhe; Lerato Modise	McJunior; Lerato Modise	~~Lerato Modise~~; ~~Liema~~	Pale; Sinaye	~~Els~~; ~~Jareed~~	Zee; Jareed	Willy; Jareed	Mpumi; Willy	Ejected (Day 54)		15
Lerato Modise	Mpumi; Yolanda	Mpumi; Jareed	~~Pale~~; ~~Mich~~	Pale; Jareed	Fake; Eviction (Day 28)	Sinaye; McJunior	Zee; Sinaye	Mpumi; Willy	Evicted (Day 50)		14
Jareed	McJunior; Lerato Modise	Makhekhe; McJunior	~~Papaghost~~; ~~Lerato Modise~~	Yolanda; Papaghost	~~Makhekhe~~; ~~Yolanda~~	Meelay; Yolanda	Yolanda; Makhekhe	Evicted (Day 49)			5
Els	Neo; Fahima	Mpumi; Papaghost	~~Yolanda~~; ~~Lerato Modise~~	Mich; Lerato Modise	~~Yolanda~~; ~~McJunior~~	Liema; Makhekhe	Makhekhe; McJunior	Evicted (Day 49)			6
Mich	Papaghost; Lerato Modise	Fahima; Lerato Modise	~~Papaghost~~; ~~Fahima~~	Pale; Papaghost	~~Sinaye~~; ~~McJunior~~	Taki; Sinaye	Evicted (Day 42)				3
Taki	~~Jareed~~; ~~Yolanda~~	~~Yolanda~~; ~~Papaghost~~	~~Yolanda~~; ~~Papaghost~~	Willy; Young Pappi	~~Makhekhe~~; ~~Young Pappi~~	Mich; Papaghost	Evicted (Day 42)				9
Meelay	Taki; McJunior	Taki; McJunior	~~Fahima~~; ~~Pale~~	Pale; Taki	~~Liema~~; ~~Jareed~~	Zee; Jareed	Evicted (Day 42)				4
Chuenzaaa	Mpumi; Papaghost	Sammy_M; Meelay	~~Fahima~~; ~~Willy~~	Pale; Liema	~~Meelay~~; ~~Makhekhe~~	Taki; Sinaye	Evicted (Day 42)				0
Pale	Yolanda; McJunior	Papaghost; Lerato Modise	~~Papaghost~~; ~~Lerato Modise~~	Mich; Yolanda	Evicted (Day 28)						10
Sammy_M	Yolanda; Lerato Modise	Willy; Fahima	Evicted (Day 14)								2
Mali	Bravo B Meelay	Evicted (Day 7)									2
Bravo B	Sinaye; McJunior	Ejected (Day 5)									1
Disruptors
Fahima	~~Els~~; ~~Lerato Modise~~	~~Els~~; ~~Liema~~	~~Chuenzaaa~~; ~~Yolanda~~	Rated out (Day 21)							4
Neo	~~Els~~; ~~Mali~~	~~Liema~~; ~~Papaghost~~	~~Papaghost~~; ~~Lerato Modise~~	Rated out (Day 21)							1
Note	1	none	2	3	none		4	5	6	none	
Nominated (pre-save and replace)	Fake Nominations	McJunior; Mpumi; Sammy_M; Lerato Modise; Papaghost	Fake Nominations	Yolanda; Pale; Liema; Mich; Papaghost; Taki	Fake Nominations	Makhekhe; Sinaye; McJunior; Yolanda; Jareed; Liema; Mich; Meelay; Zee; Papaghost; Taki	Makhekhe; Sinaye; McJunior; Yolanda; Willy; Jareed; Liema; Lerato Modise; Els	Sinaye; Mpumi; Willy; Young Pappi; Liema; Zee; Lerato Modise	Makhekhe; Sinaye; McJunior; Mpumi; Willy; Liema; Zee	none	
Saved	Fake Nominations	McJunior	Fake Nominations	Taki	Fake Nominations	Jareed	Willy	none		none	
Against public vote	Makhekhe; Sinaye; Bravo B McJunior; Yolanda; Mpumi; Pale; Willy; Jareed; Young Pappi; Liema; Meelay; Mali; Zee; Chuenzaaa; Lerato Modise; Papaghost; Els	Mpumi; Sammy_M; Zee; Lerato Modise; Papaghost	Fahima; Neo; Taki	Yolanda; Pale; Liema; Mich; Lerato Modise; Papaghost	none	Makhekhe; Sinaye; McJunior; Yolanda; Liema; Mich; Meelay; Zee; Chuenzaaa; Papaghost; Taki	Makhekhe; Sinaye; McJunior; Yolanda; Jareed; Liema; Lerato Modise; Els	Sinaye; Mpumi; Willy; Young Pappi; Liema; Zee	Makhekhe; Sinaye; McJunior; Mpumi; Willy; Zee	Makhekhe; Sinaye; McJunior; Mpumi; Zee; Papaghost	
Ejected	Bravo B	none						Yolanda	none		
Walked	none	none						none	none		
Evicted	Mali; 0.63% to save	Sammy M 9.19% to save	Fahima; 13.97% to save	Pale; 4.51% to save	No Evictions	Chuenzaaa; 1.08% to save	Els; 1.07% to save	Lerato Modise; Fate Room Eviction	Liema; Bribed	Papaghost; 3.36% to win	
Evicted	Mali; 0.63% to save	Sammy M 9.19% to save	Fahima; 13.97% to save	Pale; 4.51% to save	No Evictions	Meelay; 1.27% to save	Els; 1.07% to save	Lerato Modise; Fate Room Eviction	Liema; Bribed	Mpumi; 5.81% to win	
Evicted	Mali; 0.63% to save	Sammy M 9.19% to save	Neo; 37.62% to save	Pale; 4.51% to save	No Evictions	Taki; 1.85% to save	Jareed; 2.42% to save	Young Pappi; 3.50% to save	Willy; 1.62% to save	Sinaye; 7.86% to win	
Evicted	Mali; 0.63% to save	Sammy M 9.19% to save	Neo; 37.62% to save	Pale; 4.51% to save	No Evictions	Mich; 5.28% to save	Jareed; 2.42% to save	Young Pappi; 3.50% to save	Willy; 1.62% to save	Zee; 14.00% to win	
Evicted	Mali; 0.63% to save	Sammy M 9.19% to save	Neo; 37.62% to save	Pale; 4.51% to save	No Evictions	Mich; 5.28% to save	Jareed; 2.42% to save	Young Pappi; 3.50% to save	Willy; 1.62% to save	Makhekhe; 34.45% to win	
Survived	Meelay; 0.68% to save Pale; 1.55% to save McJunior; 1.96% to save Jareed; 2.28% to save Papaghost; 2.60% to save Young Pappi; 2.81% to save Els; 2.97% to save Willy; 3.47% to save Mpumi; 3.57% to save Chuenzaaa; 4.57% to save Lerato Modise; 4.74% to save Makhekhe; 6.74% to save Sinaye; 9.09% to save Yolanda; 9.31% to save Liema; 11.67% to save Zee; 12.78% to save ~~Bravo B~~; ~~18.57%~~; ~~to save~~	Lerato Modise; 11.98% to save Papaghost; 13.09% to save Mpumi; 26.59% to save Zee; 39.15% to save	Taki; 41.31% to save	Papaghost; 9.39% to save Lerato Modise; 9.70% to save Mich; 14.25% to save Yolanda; 28.81% to save Liema; 33.34% to save	No Evictions	Sinaye; 5.93% to save Papaghost; 6.57% to save Makhekhe; 9.96% to save Zee; 10.80% to save McJunior; 17.74% to save Liema; 19.37% to save Yolanda; 20.15% to save	Lerato Modise; 6.72% to save Sinaye; 8.20% to save Makhekhe; 12.91% to save McJunior; 18.43% to save Liema; 19.50% to save Yolanda; 33.64% to save	Willy; 3.99% to save Zee; 16.92% to save Mpumi; 21.80% to save Sinaye; 21.94% to save Liema; 31.85% to save	Mpumi; 9.97% to save Sinaye; 15.57% to save Zee; 16.07% to save Makhekhe; 28.31% to save McJunior; 28.47% to save	McJunior; 34.50% to win	

=== Notes ===
- ^Note 1: On Day 4, after the Thursday Night Pool Party, Bravo B and Makhekhe used derogatory language, behaving in a manner that threatened the safety of the housemates and showed intent to harm another housemate. On Day 5, Big Brother then called all housemates to the lounge and showed them the video of Bravo B and Makhekhe's conversation. He then issued Makhekhe a double strike, and Bravo B was disqualified from the show as the conversation driver.
- ^Note 2: In Week 3, there were fake nominations, with viewers asked to rate the three disruptors. The highest rated would become a real housemate, while the other two would be evicted.
- ^Note 3: Due to an eviction twist on day 28, Lerato Modise and Papaghost were fake evicted into secret cabin for a number of days while watching the show before they were bought back.
- ^Note 4: In Week 7, there was no save and replace. Instead, Big Brother introduced the Fate Room, where two games were played by the nominated housemates. Willy won the challenge and was therefore immune from eviction that week.
- ^Note 5: In Week 8, Lerato Modise was sent to the Fate Room and Big Brother instructed her to spin the arrow on a wheel with two options: Finale or Eviction. After spinning the arrow, it landed on Eviction, and she was evicted immediately.
- ^Note 6: In Week 9, Liema was also sent to the Fate Room and Big Brother gave her two options: Either stay on the nomination list or leave the house immediately, but leave with R250 000. She chose the R250 000 and was evicted.

== Public nomination percentages ==
The public was voting for their favourite housemate. Voting started on Monday night and closed on Thursday night. On Sunday's live eviction show, only the voting percentages of the housemates at the bottom were revealed.

Full percentages were revealed in April 2024 on the official website.

Public nomination phase
	Week 1	Week 2	Week 4	Week 5	Week 6	Week 7	Week 8	Week 9	Week 10
McJunior	1.96%	-	HOH	HOH	17.74%	18.43%	-	28.47%	34.50%
Makhekhe	6.74%	-	No Voting	-	9.96%	12.91%	-	28.21%	34.45%
Zee	12.78%	39.15%	No Voting	-	10.80%	-	16.92%	16.07%	14.0%
Sinaye	9.01%	-	No Voting	-	5.93%	8.20%	21.94%	15.56%	7.86%
Mpumi	3.57%	26.59%	No Voting	-	-	HOH	21.80%	9.97%	5.81%
Papaghost	2.60%	13.09%	No Voting	9.39%	6.57%	-	HOH	HOH	3.36%
Willy	3.47%	-	No Voting	-	HOH	-	3.99%	1.62%	
Liema	11.67%	-	No Voting	33.34%	19.37%	19.50%	31.85%		
Young Pappi	2.81%	-	No Voting	-	-	-	3.50%		
Yolanda	9.31%	-	No Voting	28.81%	20.15%	33.64%			
Lerato Modise	4.74%	11.98%	No Voting	9.70%	-	6.72%			
Jareed	2.28%	-	No Voting	-	-	2.42%			
Els	2.97%	-	No Voting	-	-	1.07%			
Mich	HOH	-	No Voting	14.25%	5.28%				
Taki	-	-	No Voting	-	1.85%				
Meelay	0.68%	-	No Voting	-	1.27%				
Chuenzaa	4.57%	-	No Voting	-	1.08%				
Pale	1.55%	-	No Voting	4.51%					
Sammy_M	Immune	9.19%							
Mali	0.63%								
Bravo B	18.57%								

== Nomination Table ==
Weeks	Nominated	Evicted
Week 1	Makhekhe, Sinaye, Bravo B, McJunior, Yolanda, Mpumi, Pale, Willy, Jareed, Young Pappi, Liema, Meelay, Mali, Zee, Chuenzaaa, Lerato Modise, Papaghost & Els	Bravo B (Ejected) & Mali
Week 2	Mpumi, Sammy M, Zee, Lerato Modise & Papaghost	Sammy M
Week 3	Fake Nominations	Neo & Fahima (Rated out)
Week 4	Yolanda, Pale, Liema, Mich, Lerato Modise & Papaghost	Pale
Week 5	Fake Nominations	none
Week 6	Makhekhe, Sinaye, McJunior, Yolanda, Liema, Mich, Meelay, Zee, Chuenzaaa, Papaghost & Taki	Mich, Meelay, Chuenzaaa & Taki
Week 7	Makhekhe, Sinaye, McJunior, Yolanda, Jareed, Liema, Lerato Modise, Els	Jareed & Els
Week 8	Sinaye, Mpumi, Willy, Young Pappi, Liema, Zee & Lerato Modise	Lerato Modise, Yolanda (Ejected) & Young Pappi
Week 9	Makhekhe, Sinaye, McJunior, Mpumi, Willy & Zee	Liema (Left) & Willy
Week 10	Makhekhe, Sinaye, McJunior, Mpumi, Zee & Papaghost	Makhekhe, Sinaye, Mpumi, Zee & Papaghost
