= 2026 Basadi in Music Awards =

South African Music Awards

- Sponsored by: SAMPRA
- Date: 7-8 August 2026
- Venue: Joburg Theatre, Braamfontein
- Country: South Africa
- Hosted by: Unathi Nkayi; Anele Zondo; Nomuzi Mabena; Lerato Kganyago

Highlights
- Most awards: MaWhoo (2)
- Most nominations: Zee Nxumalo (6)
- Website: basadiinmusicawards.co.za

Television/radio coverage
- Network: SABC 2

The 2026 Basadi in Music Awards took place from the 7th to 8th of August 2026, at the Joburg Theatre in Braamfontein, Johannesburg to celebrate and honour women in South African music industry.

Zee Nxumalo received most nominations with total of 6 nods, followed by MaWhoo with 5.

== Background ==
Nominations for 2026 event were open from 30 April and ran up until 30 May, marking their fifth year of recognising and celebrating women in the music industry.

== Winners and nominees ==
Below list are nominees. Winners are listed first in bold face.

=== Music Awards ===
Afro Pop Artist of the Year	Amapiano Artist of the Year
**Kelly Khumalo – ‘Nyamezela’**; Aya Msani – ‘Sondela’; Maleh – ‘Khotso Le Lesedi’ (Lesotho); Nonny Muji – ‘Lo Bhuti’; Pretty Masompisi – ‘eKhaya’; Phumla Music – ‘Brand New’	**MaWhoo**; DBN Gogo; Kamo Mphela; Nkosazana Daughter; Nobuhle; Thatohatsi; Zee Nxumalo
Artist of the Year	Best Female Feature of the Year
**Zee Nxumalo**; Ayra Starr (Nigeria); Kharishma; MaWhoo; Mmatema; Nkosazana Daughter; Shandesh; Tyla	**Sam Deep, Nia Pearl & Boohle featuring Mano – ‘Shela’**; De Rose – ‘Lutho’; Kabza De Small featuring Nontokozo Mkhize & Mthunzi – ‘Siyabonga’; Kabza De Small, MDU aka TRP featuring Zawadi Yamungu – ‘Lawuleka’; Kelvin Momo featuring Zee_nhle, Mashudu & Mano – ‘Spani Sam’; MaWhoo, GL_Ceejay, Jazzworx & Thukuthela featuring Tracy & Thatohatsi – ‘Tholukuthi (Bengicela)’
Best Styled Artist of the Year	Collaboration of the Year
**Thabsie**; Lamiez Holworthy; DJ Zinhle; Nia Pearl; Uncle Waffles (eSwatini); Zawadi Yamungu; Zee Nxumalo	**Lwah Ndlunkulu & Starr Healer – ‘Allowance’**; Cici & Naledi Aphiwe – ‘Amen’; DJ Zinhle & Thabsie – ‘Kusazokhanya’; Erin Elliot & Sophia Frank – ‘Birthday Cake’; MaWhoo & Zee Nxumalo – ‘Sesamukela’; Mamakie Motlogelwa & Mmaausi – ‘Chuku’
Dance Music Artist of the Year	DJ of the Year
**Kharishma**; Babes Wodumo; DJ Zinhle & Liema Pantsi; Shandesh; Uncle Waffles (eSwatini)	**DBN Gogo**; DJ Lesa; Kasi Duchaz; Kele Megano; Lerato Kganyago; Uncle Waffles (eSwatini)
Gospel Artist of the Year	Pop Artist of the Year
**Mmatema – ‘Oa Ntwanela’**; Ada Ehi – ‘Maberumo’ (Nigeria); Futhi Mhlongo – ‘Phat Igama LikaJesu’; HLE – ‘Blessed’; Musa Yende – ‘Kubo Bonke’	**Ava like Lava - Tokyo Thrift**; Erin Elliot – She Said; Shekhinah – What Are We?; Sophia Frank – Overrated; Anica Kiana – Not The Same
Hip-Hop Artist of the Year	Jazz Artist of the Year
**Ney The Bae – Whole City**; Bomb$hell Grenade ft. Yo Maps – Weka (Zambia); K.Keed – Dilemma; Mega Snowflake – Biggest; Nadia Nakai – REALLY; Rouge ft. Moozlie & Nadia Nakai – Juicy; XXC Legacy ft. Emtee – Legacy	**Judith Sephuma - Makeba**; Busigold – Mvelinqangi; Kearoma Rantao – Keledi Marameng (Botswana); Melorie Jane – Now Open Your Eyes; Nokuthula Fundama – Wothini Na
Reggae Artist of the Year	Song of the Year
**Cindy Sanye - Nayise Naye (Uganda)**; Dimahr – Ancient Waters; Empress Deevyne – You’re Worthy; Undefynd Musiq – Beacon; Cathy Matete – We Won’t Be Silent (Kenya)	**Nothando Hlophe - Methodist Medley**; Ayra Starr – Hot Body (Nigeria); Kamo Mphela – Partii; Kharishma – Wa Inama; MaWhoo – Bengicela; Tyla – Chanel; Zee Nxumalo – Mamma
SAMRO Songwriter of the year	Traditional Artist of the year
**Nonny Muji - Lo Bhuti**; Buhlebendalo – Zulu; Cici and Naledi Aphiwe – Amen; Thando Zide – Emandulo; Zawadi Yamungu – Woza Wemvula; Maleh – Dithapelo (Lesotho)	**Buhlebendalo - Zulu**; Dr Nothembi – Isinya Lekosini; Mamakie Motlogelwa & Mmaausi – Chuku; Miss Hilary – A ni tleli; Thope Tse Khang – Li Peke (Lesotho)
Newcomer of the Year
**Simphiwe Black - Edolobeni**; Busigold – Mvelinqangi; De Rose – Kwa Gogo; Mafuthi Madondo – Vumani; Sakhile – U’lo

=== Vanguard Awards ===
Artist Manager of the Year	Entertainment Journalist of the Year
**Sannah Thwala**; Daisy Thato Selebogo (Botswana); Mela Mtimande; Shiran Weltsman; Thuli Kweupile; Vanessa Mazabane	**Ivie Ani (OkayAfrica / Vanity Fair / Vibe) (Nigeria)**; Joy Mphande (TimesLive); Lopang Mokae (Newzroom Afrika); Oluthando Keteyi (IOL Entertainment); Phumi Ramalepe (News24)
Entertainment Radio Presenter of the Year	Entertainment Radio Producer of the Year
**Boipelo Mooketsi (5FM – 5 After Hours)**; Bolele Polisa (947 - The Frequency ); Lebo Maoela (Lesedi FM - Rea Thella Afternoon Drive Show); Lebo Ndiya (Motsweding FM -Megagamola); Lerato Kganyago (Metro FM - Midday Link-Up)	**Letty Nyathela Chili (Ikwekwezi FM – Emthonjeni)**; Masego (5FM - 5 Drive ); Nthabiseng Mamabolo (Radio 2000 -Better together); Phila Tyekana (Kaya 959 – Drive 959)
Entertainment TV Producer of the Year	Hairstylist of the Year
**Minnie Dlamini (Club Bangers – Channel O)**; Dibuseng Meloe (The Morning Show); Thapelo Mowela (Morning Live)	**Smangele Sibisi**; Irene de Fonseca; Jessica Neyasi Chiau (Mozambique); Ntombomzi Lekgoro
Make Up Artist of the Year	Podcast Presenter of the Year
**Zamo Dlamini (eSwatini)**; Bokamoso Dikobe; Carol Nleya (Zimbabwe); Nono Linchwe; Renee De Wit	**Khanyi Mars (Yano Lyrics)**; Anyiko Owoko (VIP Access) (Kenya); Londi London (Read The Room); Relebogile Mabotja (Relebogile Mabotja Podcast); Yanda Woods (Spreading Humours)
Stylist of the Year	TV Show Presenter of the Year
**Khanyisile Mdletshe**; Mamello Makha; Siyamthanda Ndube; Thato Ndzimande	**Kuhle Adams (Expresso)**; Candice Modiselle (One Gospel Easter Music Special); Nomalanga Shozi (Playlist @ Moloko); Penny Lebyane (Enklek Let's Connect)

== Special Awards ==
=== Highest Air Play Award ===
- MaWhoo

=== CAPASSO Most Streamed Song ===
- Janesh

=== G100 Gallo Renaissance Award ===
- Thandiswa Mazwai
- Simphiwe Dana

=== Lifetime Achievement Award ===
- EstA M

=== Lifetime Achievement Award ===
- Dr Nothembi Mkhwebane

=== Trailblazer of the Year Award ===
- Bonang Matheba

=== International Recognition Award ===
- Monique Bingham
