= 2025 Basadi in Music Awards =

South African Music Awards

- Sponsored by: SAMPRA
- Date: 1-2 August 2025
- Venue: Joburg Theatre, Braamfontein
- Country: South Africa
- Hosted by: Lamiez Holworthy; Lerato Kganyago

Highlights
- Most awards: Nontokozo Mkhize, Naledi Aphiwe, Liema Pantsi (2 each)
- Most nominations: Liema Pantsi (5), Zee Nxumalo (4)
- Website: basadiinmusicawards.co.za

Television/radio coverage
- Network: SABC 2

The 2025 Basadi in Music Awards took place on August 1–2, 2025, at the Joburg Theatre in Braamfontein, Johannesburg to celebrate and honour women's in South African music industry.

The nominees were announced on June 19. Zee Nxumalo received the most nominations with 4 nods.

== Winners and nominees ==
Below list are nominees. Winners are listed first in bold face.

=== Vanguard Awards ===
Artist Manager of the Year	Entertainment Radio Presenter of the Year
**Tholsi Pillay**; Hloni Hlo Mohlala; Phindile Matroshe; Maphuthi Perez; Miss T Thwala	**Lootlove – The Touchdown Metro FM**; Relebogile Mabotja – 702 Unplugged Sessions; Hlekani Shikwambana – Capricorn Experience Capricorn FM; Lebo Maoela – Lesedi FM; Kgomotso Meso – 959 Kaya FM; Mannehileng Letuka – Lesedi FM
Entertainment Journalist of the Year	Choreographer of the Year
**Mapule Pule – Maftown online**; Keitumetse Maako – News 24; Joy Mphande – Tshisa Live; Nokuthula Zwane – Media 24; Mbali Mbatha – City Press	**Tlhogi Molefi**; Delta the Leo; Bontle Modiselle
Entertainment TV Presenter of the Year	Best Styled Artist of the Year
Lerai Newsish – MTV Base; Zanele Potela – Hotspot Seli; Mpumi Mlambo – Ushuni Womhlaba SABC 1	**Moozlie**; Faith K; Kamo Mphela; Anele Zondo (Ney the Bae)
Entertainment TV Producer of the Year	Entertainment Radio Producer of the Year
**Relebogile Mabotja – Tyla's Showmax Homecoming Concert**; Dineo Lusenga – The Orbit YouTube	**Noni Khumalo – The Lunch League Y**; Tlou Tlonae – Capricorn Breakfast Capricorn FM; Phindile Mthombeni – The AM Prime Show Emalahleni FM; Dineo Lusenga – The Midday Link Up Metro FM
Make Up Artist of the Year	Hairstylist of the Year
**Nomsa Madida**; Bongi Mlotswa; Nono Linchwe; Stephy Kwanaite	**Tumelo Mj Afrobotique**; Hair by Nana R; Ntombomzi Lekgoro; Mbalezwehair; Jullz_Hairstylist
Podcast Presenter of the Year
**Laconco – Timeline with Laconco**; Pharoahi – Popcorn and Cheese; Relebogile Mabotja – The Relebogile; Mabotja Podcast; Si Jones – Si Sessions Africa

=== Music Awards ===
Afropop Artist of the Year	Amapiano Artist of the Year
**Naledi Aphiwe – ‘Romeo and Juliet’**; Zethe – ‘Abantu’; Nomakhosini – ‘Angsafuni Ngami’; Motlanalo – ‘Goya Goyile’; Lwah Ndlunkulu – ‘Mnakwethu’	**Babalwa M – ‘Bothata’**; Kamo Mphela – ‘Woza’; Pabi Cooper – ‘Pabi Jo’; Zee Nxumalo – ‘Ngisakuthanda’; Bassie - ‘Kwelanga 2.0’
Sofnfree Artist of the Year	Collaboration of the Year
**Zee Nxumalo – ‘Ngsakuthanda’**; Xolly Ncwango – ‘Liyabasebenzela’; Kamo Mphela – ‘Woza’; Nontokozo Mkhize – ‘Esandleni’; Makhadzi – ‘Number 1’	**Cici and Liema Pantsi– ‘Impumelelo’**; Babalwa M and Yallunder – ‘Mthuthuzeli’; Mpho Sebina and Lioness Ratang – ‘Lioness’; Nosipho, Cici and Liema Pantsi – ‘Home’; Boohle, DEE Koala, K Mat – ‘Iskhath’ Sam Manje’
Dance Artist of the Year	DJ of the Year
**Shandesh – Sdudla/Slender**; Manana Highness – Mdali; Makhadzi – Number 1; Kharishma – Chokeslem; Azana – Abogogo	**Lamiez Holworthy**; Lerato Kganyago; DJ Tshepi; DJ Zinhle; Kele Megano
Gospel Artist of the Year	Hip Hop Artist of the Year
**Nontokozo Mkhize – ‘Esandleni’**; Mapula Monyepao – ‘Hale Phirimile’; Sneizy Uyinqaba – ‘Yethu’; Xolly Mncwango – ‘Liyabasebenzela’; Sindi Ntombela – ‘Ulithemba Lethu’	**Gigi Lamayne – ‘Bleed Mama’**; Ms Kulie – ‘Dyi Baddie’; Nadia Nakai – ‘No Problems’; StaticFlo – ‘Seven7’; Faith – ‘K Qosh’
Jazz Artist of the Year	Reggae Artist of the Year
**Salphina Kadiaka – ‘Champaign’**; Rorisang Sechele – ‘Tsoga’; Tshenolo – ‘Freedom Song’; Gabi Motuba – ‘Order my Steps’	**MadaGlory – ‘Graceful Dub’**; Dimahr – ‘Dry Tears’; Undefynd – ‘Danceholic’; Lani M – ‘Carried Away’; Sankie Fayauman – ‘Motherland’
Traditional Artist of the Year	Song of the Year
**MmaAusi – ‘2 Pula’**; Phumla Music – ‘Makhonjwa’; Esther Mphahlele – ‘Basadi’; Miss Hillary – ‘Hangwani’	**Nontokozo Mkhize – ‘Esandleni’**; Zee Nxumalo – ‘Ngisakuthanda’; Bassie - 'Kwelanga 2.0’; Aya Msani – ‘Dubai 2.0’; Lwah Ndlunkulu – ‘Mnakwethu’
Songwriter of the Year	Newcomer of the Year
**Liema Pantsi – ‘Let me Be’**; Bongiwe Mngomezulu – ‘Uyangihola’; Cnethemba Gonelo – ‘Lindishonele’; Motlanalo – ‘Goya Goyile’; Zoe Modiga – ‘Uyakhazimula’	**Nonny Muji – ‘Nguye‘**; Ayarhkay – ‘Hamba‘; Lani M – ‘What You Made Of’; Mega; Snowflake – ‘Aketeng’; Liema Pantsi
Pop Artist of the Year	Music Video of the Year
**Jamie-Lee Sexton – ‘Missing’**; Chante – ‘Stay the Night’; Tasha Baxter – ‘Bipolar Bear’; Anica Kiana – ‘Kiss me Hard’	**Kharishma – ‘Chokeslem’**; Liema Pantsi – ‘Let me Be’; Zee Nxumalo – ‘Ngisakuthanda’; Naledi Aphiwe – ‘Ngiyabonga’; Pabi Cooper – ‘Pabi Jo’

== Special awards ==
Non-voting category recipients

=== Capasso Most Streamed Song ===
- Naledi Aphiwe - "Ngiyabonga"

=== CEO Mosadi In Business Achievement Award Recipients ===
- Portia Mngomezulu

=== Highest Airplay ===
- Bassie - "Kwelanga 2.0"

=== The Lifetime Achievement Recipients ===
- Dr Rebecca Malope

=== Trailblazer of the Year ===
- Bongi Mlotswa
