= Boohle =

South African singer and songwriter

- Also known as: Boohle
- Born: Buhlebevangeli Hlengiwe Manyathi; February 20, 1999 (age 27); Vosloorus, Gauteng, South Africa
- Origin: South Africa
- Genres: Amapiano; afro-pop; afro-house; gospel
- Occupation: Singer
- Instrument: Vocals
- Years active: 2016–present
- Label: 2020

Buhlebevangeli Hlengiwe Manyathi, professionally known as Boohle, is a South African singer and songwriter. She is popularly known for her songs "Yini Na", "Mama", "Siyathandana" and "Hamba wena". Her music is a combination of amapiano, afro-house, afro-soul, and gospel.

== Early life and career ==
She was born in Vosloorus, Gauteng in 1999 where she grew up & attended Lethulwazi Secondary School. She started her music career in 2016 when she and her siblings founded a gospel vocal trio.

Her single titled "Yini Na" reached number one on YFM’s Hot 99 chart with DJ Candii while her other songs such as "Slala Amalunde" made airwaves on radio stations such as Jozi FM, Capricorn FM and Kasie FM.

In July 2020, she released Izibongo, an 8 track album featuring her long time producers, Tee-Jay and Elastic. She has also worked with JazziDisciples, Nonny D and DJ Stokie. In October 2020, she collaborated with Josiah De Disciple on a 10 track album titled Umbuso Wabam’nyama. The album featured local musicians Le Sax, Chelete and Mogomotsi Chosen.

On August 9, 2021, She was nominated for Best new artist of the Year at the African Social Entertainment Awards.

Her single “Ngixolele” which was produced by amapiano record producer Busta 929 occupied the top spot on The Official South African Charts. The single amassed in excess of 778 200 streams across Spotify, Apple Music and Deezer.

In November 2021, she won best amapiano newcomer and best amapiano female vocalist at the South African Amapiano Awards.

=== 2023–present: Umhlobo ===
On May 20, she announced her third studio album Umhlobo. Two lead singles "Mhlobo Wami" and "Nakindaba Zakho" were released in May 2024.

The album was released on June 14, 2024.

== Discography ==
=== Studio albums ===
- Izibongo (2020)
- iSlomo (2022)
- Umhlobo (2024)

=== Collaborative albums ===
- Umbuso Wabam' nyama (with Josiah De Desciple) (2020)

=== Extended plays ===
- Sfikile (2021)

=== As lead artist ===
List of singles as lead artist, with selected chart positions and certifications, showing year released and album name
Title	Year	Peak chart positions	Certifications	Album
Title	Year	ZA	Certifications	Album
"Memeza" (featuring ThackzinDJ, TeeJay)	2020	—		Non-album single
"Tata/Iyalila"	2020	—		Izibongo
"Wanna Give it All"	2020	—		Izibongo
"Buyisa" (Boohle, Josiah De Desciple)	2020	—		Umbuso Wabam' nyama
"Mama" (Boohle, Josiah De Desciple)	2020	—		Umbuso Wabam' nyama
"Sizo' phumelela" (Boohle, Josiah De Desciple)	2020	—		Umbuso Wabam' nyama
"—" denotes a recording that did not chart or was not released in that territory.

== Awards and nominations ==
Year	Award ceremony	Prize	Result
2021	South African Amapiano Awards	Best amapiano newcomer	Won
2021	South African Amapiano Awards	Best amapiano female vocalist	Won
2021	African Social Entertainment Awards	Best new artist of the Year	Nominated
2022	Basadi in Music Awards	SAMPRA Artist of the Year	Won
