= DBN Gogo =

South African DJ

- Born: Mandisa Radebe; Durban, KwaZulu-Natal, South Africa
- Genres: Amapiano; House
- Occupations: DJ; music producer
- Years active: 2020-present
- Label: Zikode Records (2022 - present)

Mandisa Radebe professionally known as DBN Gogo, is a South African DJ and music producer who was born on 28 May 1993. Born in Durban and raised in Pretoria, she gained local attention following release of her debut single "Khuza Gogo", which was certified Platinum in South Africa.

== Career ==
In April 2020, she was featured on Channel O's Lockdown House Party hosted by Channel 0 and garnered local attention.

"Khuza Gogo" featuring Mpura, Ama Avenger, and M.J was released on 19 March 2021. The song was certified platinum by in South Africa.

On 21 August 2021, her first collaborative EP Thokoza Café with DJ Dinho was released

In October 2021, she became the first South African to join Global Equal programme by Spotify.

In 1 February, she was announced as a host of Boiler Room x Ballantine's True Music Studios. Her record label Zikode Records was established in February 2022, in partnership with Universal Music Group.

"Bells" with TNK MusiQ, DJ Stopper featuring Eltonk SA was released on March 4, 2022. The song entered Local Streaming Top 10 at number 1.

In March 2022, she was featured on Spotify Africa Radar programme.

In 24 April, she performed at Coachella Valley Music and Arts Festival in the in U.S.

In early November 2022, She announced her debut studio album What's Real. The album was released on 25 November 2022.

In 2023, she collaborated with singer Zee Nxumalo and DJ duo Shakes & Les on the song "Funk 55". The song peaked at no. 6 and was certified 5× platinum by the Recording Industry of South Africa (RiSA).

== Personal life ==
Mandisa Radebe was born in Durban, but her family relocated to Pretoria where she grew up and spent her childhood. Her interest in music began at an early age, participating in school choirs. She studied law at the University of Pretoria.

Radebe comes from a business and politically connected family. She is the daughter of former South African minister in the presidency Jeff Radebe who was also the former minister of energy. Businesswoman and mining magnate Bridgette Motsepe Radebe is her stepmother.

She is also related to South African billionaire Patrice Motsepe and South African President Cyril Ramaphosa.

== Discography ==
- Thokoza Café (2021) (with DJ Dinho)
- Break Through (2021) (with Unlimited Soul)
- Whats Real (2022)
- Click Bait (2024)
- The Godmother (2025)

== Singles ==
=== As lead artist ===
List of singles as lead artist, with selected chart positions and certifications, showing year released and album name
Title	Year	Peak chart positions	Certifications	Album
Title	Year	ZA	Certifications	Album
"Mayonie" (DBN Gogo featuring Jobe London, Makhanj, the LowKeys)	2019	—		Non-album single
"Sgubu" (Shuffle Musiq, Dinho, DBN Gogo featuring Kbrizzy & Malindi)	2020	—		
"Khuza Gogo" (DBN Gogo Blaqnik, Masterblaq featuring Mpura, AmaAvenger, M.J)	2021		RiSA: Platinum	
"Kash" (Junior De Rocka, DBN Gogo featuring Khvya M & Tripl3x_Da Ghost)	2021	—		
"Zwonaka" (Mellow & Sleazy, DBN Gogo)	2021	—		
"Bambelela" (DBN Gogo, Felo Le Tee, Pabi Cooper featuring Young Stunna)	2022	—		
"Bells" (DBN Gogo, TNK Musiq, DJ Stopper featuring Eltonk SA)	2022	1		
"Buya (feat. Nvcho, Nia Pearl, Madlamini, S・O・N, Mathandos, Nicole, Nanette)	2022	—		
"Back2School" (Mellow & Sleazy, DBN Gogo featuring Thabza Tee & LastBorn Diroba)	2022	—		
"Rough Dance" (DBN Gogo, Reece Madlisa, featuring 2woshort, Classic Deep, six40)	2023	—		
"Washaaa" (Sfarzo Rtee, Kelvin Momo, DBN Gogo featuring Shaun 101)	2023	—		
"Bhuti" (Nobantu Vilakazi featuring 2woshort, Visca, Shaun Musiq, Ftears)	2023	—		
"Masterpiece" (TNK Musiq, DBN Gogo, featuring Rivalz)	2023	—		
"Ziphi" (The Boy Tapes, DBN Gogo, T Man Express featuring DrummeRTee924, DQ Official, Sfarzo Rtee)	2023	—		
"Uweeeh 2.0" (PRVIS3, Xola TSM, DBN Gogo featuring 2woBunnies)	2023	—		
"Daily Paper" (Thutho The Human, DBN Gogo, K-Mat featuring Papa Ghana)	2023	—		
"SAdesFakSHen" (DBN Gogo, Benny Bennasi, Thutho The Human)	2023	—		
"Baba Kat Girl" (Unkle Ken, DBN Gogo, Moonchild Sanelly featuring ShennyDaDeejay & Candy FLow RSA)	2023	—		
"Jikeleza" (DJ Stopper, DBN Gogo, Khanyisa featuring KMAT, Stixx)	2023	—		
"Be Honest" (Elton K, DBN Gogo)	2023	—		
"Sikelela" (2woshort, Stompiiey, DBN Gogo, Nvcho, Madlamini)	2023	—		
"Funk 55" (Shakes & Les and DBN Gogo featuring Zee Nxumalo Ceeka RSA, Chley)	2023	6	5× Platinum	Funk Series
"MALI MALI" (DBN Gogo, Shazmiscoul, Yumbs featuring Baby S.O.N & Mashudu)	2023	—		
"Empini" (Nthabo & DBN Gogo featuring Mnansh, Ze2 & Sipho Magudelela)	2024	—		Non-album single
"Sahara" (Benny Chill, DBN Gogo & Mustbedubz)	2024			
"Balimele" (DBN Gogo, Tyler ICU, LeeMcKrazy, Khalil Harrison, Tumelo_za, Ceeka RSA & Eltee)	2024	_	RiSA: Gold	Non-album single
"Sgafro" (Inter B & Draad, DBN Gogo & Senjay)	2024	_		Non-album single
"Sondela" (Ray&Jay, DBN Gogo & Mr Nation Thingz featuring TurnUpKiid, P L U T O & Lady Steezy)	2024	—		Non-album single
"Sweet Sounds" (J Slayz, DBN Gogo, Ghost & Mosixty featuring Ofentse Moses Sebula)	2024	—		Non-album single
"Hamba No Choppa" (031Choppa, Royal MusiQ & DBN Gogo featuring Djy Biza)	2024	—		Non-album single
"Pure Bliss" (Luzyo Keys, 2wo Bunnies & DBN Gogo)	2024	_		
"Phunyuka" (ShennyDaDeejay, Candy Flow SA & DBN Gogo)		_		
"Sghubu Sethu" (uLazi, DBN Gogo & Benzoo featuring Goodguy Styles & Justmajus)		_		
"Touched The Sky" (Dennis Ferrer, DBN Gogo & Effected featuring Mia Tuttavilla & Triple X Da Ghost)		_		
"NTSH" (Thuto The Human, DBN Gogo & DJ Stopper)	2025	_		
"Ghana Ghana" (Soul Jam, Massive95k & DBN Gogo featuring Ego Slimflow, M.J, Mfana Mdu & Mr Pilato		_		
"Sfargo 71" (Senjay, Inter B & Draad, DBN Gogo)		_		
"Sangena" (Surreal Sessions, DBN Gogo, Nobantu Vilakazi & Ty slique)		_		
"—" denotes a recording that did not chart or was not released in that territory.

== Awards ==
=== Basadi in Music Awards ===
Year	Nominee / work	Award	Result	Ref.
2022	Herself	DJ of the Year	Nominated	
2022	"Bambelela" (featuring Pabi Cooper, Young Stunna)	Song of the Year	Nominated	
2026	Herself	DJ of the Year	Won	
2026	Herself	Amapiano Artist of the Year	Nominated	

=== Clout Africa awards ===
Year	Nominee / work	Award	Result	Ref.
2022	Herself	DJ of the Year	Won	

=== DStv Mzansi Viewers' Choice Awards ===
Year	Nominee / work	Award	Result	Ref.
2022	Herself	Favourite DJ	Nominated	
2022	Herself	Favourite Personality	Nominated	

=== MTV Europe Music Awards ===
Year	Nominee / work	Award	Result	Ref.
2024	Herself	Best African Act	Pending	

=== Metro FM Music Awards ===
Year	Nominee / work	Award	Result	Ref.
2025	Herself	Best Female Artist	Nominated	
2025	Herself	Best Styled Artist	Nominated	

=== Mzansi Kwaito and House Music Awards ===
Year	Nominee / work	Award	Result	Ref.
2021	Herself	Best DJ	Nominated	
2021	"Khuza Gogo"	Best AmaPiano Song	Nominated	

=== SA Amapiano Music Awards ===
Year	Nominee / work	Award	Result	Ref.
2021	"Khuza Gogo"	Amapiano Song of the Year	Nominated	
2021	Herself	Amapiano Artist of the Year	Nominated	
2021	Herself	Best Female Amapiano Artist	Nominated	
2021	Herself	Best Amapiano Female DJ Act	Nominated	
2021	"Dakiwe"	Most Viral Amapiano Song of the Year	Nominated	

=== South African Music Awards ===
Year	Nominee / work	Award	Result	Ref.
2024	"Funk 55"	Motsepe Foundation Record of the Year	Nominated	
2024	Click Bait	Best Dance Album	Nominated	
