= Kharishma =

South African singer and songwriter (born 2004)

- Born: Melita Mogale; 27 January 2004 (age 22); Polokwane, Limpopo, South Africa
- Genre: Lekompo
- Occupations: Singer; songwriter
- Instrument: Vocals
- Years active: 2021–present
- Label: Kharishma Entertainment

Melita Mogale (born 27 January 2004) mononymously known as Kharishma, is a South African singer and songwriter. She is best known for her contributions to the Limpopo music industry "Lekompo" genre. She gained a prominence with her viral single Matome in 2023 and has since released several successful tracks and a debut album. Fans refer her as the "Queen of Lekompo" with Shandesh and Janesh.

== Early life ==
Kharishma was born and bred in Polokwane, Limpopo, South Africa. She attended Boshego High School in Mantheding, where she developed an interest in music during her eighth-grade year. Initially starting as a dancer and transitioned into singing, drawing inspiration from regional artists like Makhadzi.

== Career ==
Kharishma began her music career in 2021 with the release of her first major song Savannah, in collaboration with VRR PHA RSA. While the track did not achieve mainstream success, it helped establish her presence in Polokwane and surrounding areas.

Her breakthrough came in 2023 with the release of Matome, a collaboration with Ba Bethe Gashoazen. The song went viral, amassing over 3 million streams and marking her entry into South African music industry. Her song Chokeslam was the song of the year 2024 announced by the radio station Thobela FM and Capricorn FM.

In 2025, she released her debut album, Hear My Testimony (Juno) featuring 14 tracks and collaborations with artists includes Snowflake, Miniasque Dididado, Ba Bethe Gashoazen and TSP.

== Personal life ==
In 2023, Kharishma confirmed her teenage pregnancy, addressing public speculation on social media. She emphasized her focus on supporting her child and career, urging respect for her privacy.

On 31 October 2025, she was involved in a car accident near Sedikela Filling Station on the R37 in Ga Kgwete, Greater Tubatse. She sustained mild injuries and was in stable condition following the incident. The driver of the car, a University of Johannesburg student, died on the scene and another victim, a University of Limpopo student, died later at the hospital.

== Discography ==
=== Studio albums ===
- Juno (2025)

=== Extended plays ===
- Malapi (2023)

== Singles ==
=== As lead artist ===
List of singles as lead artist, with selected chart positions and certifications, showing year released and album name
Title	Year	Peak chart positions	Certifications	Album
Title	Year	ZA	Certifications	Album
"Samuel"	2022	—		
"Malapi" (Kharishma, Ba Bethe Gashoazen)	2022	—		
"Rato" (Giggo Cosco, KholoMusiq, Kharishma)	2023	—		The Love Story
"Tsa Lehloyo 2.0" (SSLASH S.A, Kharishma, Baby Dee)	2023	—		
"Wae Roba" (Ampee S.A, Kharishma, Krusher KR)	2023	—		
"Pelo Yaka" (Paige, Kharishma, Vee Mampeezy)	2023	—		
"Community" (Kharishma, Ba Bethe Gashoazen)	2023	—		
"Ong'costile" (071 Nelly The Master Beat, Kharishma)	2023	—		
"Matome" (Kharishma featuring Ba Bethe Gashoazen)	2023	—		
"Sekoloto"	2023	—		
"Sekoloto 2.0" (Kharishma, Ba Bethe Gashoazen)	2023	—		
"O Phelan Jwang" (Naqua Phobla, Kharishma)	2023	—		
"Lesibana" (071Nelly The Master Beat, Titi Kgole, Kharishma)	2023	—		
"Areyeng"	2023	—		
"Mmalo" (Kharishma, 071Nelly The Master Beat)	2023	—		
"Savannah" (VRR PHA Production , Kharishma, )	2024	—		
"Suka Maboss'eng" (Shebeshxt, Kharishma, Leemckrazy, Naqua SA)	2024	—		
"Cancel" (Shebeshxt, Kharishma, Boikarabelo)	2024	—		
"Keye Tloko" (Kharishma, DR Nel, DJ Active, Mash K Beats)	2024	—		
"Di Tleronko" (Kharishma, Phobla on the Beats, Prince Zulu)	2024	—		
"Kea Tiya Tiya" (Kharishma, Ba Bethe Gashoazen)	2024	—		
"Wa Ntaela Moya" (Kharishma, 071Nelly The Master Beat)	2024	—		
"Limpopo Anthem" (Kharishma, Ba Bethe Gashoazen)	2024	—		
"Chokeslem" (Kharishma, Ba Bethe Gashoazen)	2024	—		
"Re Hwela Eng" (Kharishma, Zoli White Smoke)	2024	—		
"Heelang Folang" (Kharishma, DJ Janisto, Mack Eaze)	2024	—		
"Spikareng" (Kharishma, Ba Bethe Gashoazen, VIDA SOUL)	2024	—		
"Hennessy" (Kharishma, Ba Bethe Gashoazen)	2024	—		
"Salam Aleikum" (Kharishma, Ba Bethe Gashoazen VIDA SOUL)	2024	—		
"Tlala O Nyele" (Kharishma, Ba Bethe Gashoazen)	2024	—		
"Moruti Nkapise" (Kharishma, Ba Bethe Gashoazen)	2024	—		
"Thintha Di Phese" (Kharishma, Ba Bethe Gashoazen)	2024	—		
"Ke Di Series" (Prince Benza, Kharishma)	2024	—		
"Jele" (Prince Benza, Kharishma,)	2024	—		
"Thokoza Bo Gogo" (Gogo Mathandis, Kharishma, Lilpefmance)	2025	—		
"Roller Dice" (Shebeshxt, Kharishma,VIDA SOUL, Naqua SA)	2025	—		
"Dubai" (Shebeshxt, Naqua SA, Kharishma, Mr Diego)	2025	—		
"High Fly Lekompo" (Buddy Sax, Kharishma, King Salah)	2025	—		
"Dildo TSA Yema" (071 Nelly The Master Beat, Kharishma)	2025	—		
"Ba Mo Rekisitse" (Kharishma, DJ Angelo, Buddy Sax, Mack Eaze)	2025	—		
"Dumela" (Kharishma, DJ Angelo, Buddy Sax, Sannere)	2025	—		
"—" denotes a recording that did not chart or was not released in that territory.

=== As featured artist ===
List of singles as featured artist, with selected chart positions and certifications, showing year released and album name
Title	Year	Peak chart positions	Certifications	Album
Title	Year	ZA	Certifications	Album
"Di Chommi" (Shebeshxt feauring Kharishma, Naqua SA, Shandesh)	2021	—		Topless Shxt 3
"Reminder" (Tribby Wadi Bozza featuring harishma )	2023	—		Beginning Our Forever
"Sebetse" (Shebeshxt featuring Kharishma, Tribby Wadi Bozza)	2024	—		My Music My Story
"Makhwapheni" (Makhadzi featuring Kharishma, Naqua SA)	2025	—		Mbofholowo
"—" denotes a recording that did not chart or was not released in that territory.

== Awards and nominations ==
Association	Year	Category	Nominated works	Result	Ref.
Limpopo Music Awards	2024	Best Female Artist	Herself	Won	
Limpopo Music Awards	2024	Song of the Year	Chokeslem	Won	
Thobela FM	2024	Song of the Year	Chokeslem	First	
Capricorn FM	2024	Song of the Year	Chokeslem	First	
Basadi in Music Awards	2025	Music Video of the Year	Chokeslem	Won	
Basadi in Music Awards	2025	Dance Artist of the Year	Herself	Nominated	
South African Social Media Awards	2025	Popular SA Song on Social Media	Chokeslem	Nominated	
Metro FM Music Awards	2026	Best New Artist	Herself	Won	
