= Twerk (disambiguation) =

Twerk or twerking is a style of dancing.

Twerk may also refer to:

== Music ==
- "Twerk", a song by Juicy J from the mixtape Play Me Some Pimpin 2 (2009)
- "Twerk", a song by Basement Jaxx from the album Scars (2009)
- "Twerk", a song by Lady from the mixtape Bonafide Bitch (2011)
- "Twerk", a song by Savage from the album Mayhem & Miracles (2012)
- "Twerk", a song by Problem from the mixtape Ain't Nobody Hotter Than Me (2013)
- "Twerk", an unreleased song by Lil Twist featuring Miley Cyrus and Justin Bieber (2013)
- "Twerk" (song), a song by City Girls featuring Cardi B (2018)
- "Twerk It", a song by Busta Rhymes from the album E.L.E.2 (2013)
- "Twerk Off", a song by Lloyd (2013)
- "Twerk Something (Radio)", a song by David Banner from the album Them Firewater Boyz, Vol. 1 (2000)
- "Twerkin!!!", a song by Kreayshawn from the album Somethin' 'Bout Kreay (2012)
- "Twerking", a song by twlv (2020)
- "Twerksum", a song by Pooh Shiesty from the album Shiesty Season (2021)
- "Twerka", a song by DJ Maphorisa, Shebeshxt and Xduppy

== Other uses ==
- "Twerk" (Ray Donovan), a 2013 television episode
