= Basadi in Music Awards =

South African music awards

- Current: 2026 Basadi in Music Awards
- Awarded for: Celebrate and honour women in South African music industry
- Sponsored by: South African Music Performance Rights Association
- Date: March 9, 2022

The Basadi in Music Awards (BIMAs) are South African music awards show in association with South African Music Performance Rights Association (SAMPRA), created by Hloni Modise in 2022. The awards will celebrate and honour women's in South African music industry.

== Categories ==
- Artist of the Year
- Rap/Hip Hop Artist of the Year
- Gospel Artist of the Year
- Kwaito Artist of the Year
- Amapiano Artist of the Year
- Best Dance Artist of the Year
- Afro Pop Artist of the Year
- Jazz Artist of the Year
- Newcomer of the Year
- Best Entertainment Radio Presenter
- Female DJ of the Year
- Best Pop Artist of the Year
- Kontemporêre Artist of the Year
- Music TV Show Presenter of the Year
- Entertainment Journalist of the Year
- Social Media Influencer of the Year
- Music Video Director of the Year
- Songwriter of the Year
- Stylist of the Year
- Best Entertainment Radio Producer
- Basadi in Music In Africa (2023-present)
- Reggae Artist of the Year (2023-present)
- Nando's Emerging Artist of the Year (2023-present)

== List of ceremonies ==
The inaugural ceremony initially was scheduled to be in August 2022. The ceremony date was rescheduled to October 15, 2022.

#	Date	Venue	Host city	Host
2022	15 October 2022	Gallagher Convention Centre	Midrand	Anele Zondo, Moozlie
2023	12 August 2023	Joburg Theatre	Braamfontein	Khanyi Mbau Cancelled Unathi Nkayi
2024	10 August 2024	Joburg Theatre	Braamfontein	Unathi Nkayi
2025	2 August 2025	Joburg Theatre	Braamfontein	Lamiez Holworthy; Lerato Kganyago
2026	7-8 August 2026	Joburg Theatre	Braamfontein	Unathi Nkayi; Anele Zondo; Nomuzi Mabena; Lerato Kganyago
