= Mr JazziQ =

South African DJ and music producer

- Born: Tumelo Manyoni; Alexandra, Gauteng
- Origin: South Africa
- Genres: House; Amapiano
- Occupations: Record producer; DJ
- Instruments: Piano, keyboard, vocals
- Years active: 2017–present
- Label: Black Is Brown ENT
- Formerly of: JazziDisciples

Tumelo Manyoni known professionally as Mr JazziQ, is a South African Amapiano DJ and record producer. He is best known for being a former member of the amapiano DJ duo, JazziDisciples.

== Early life and education ==
Mr JazziQ was born and raised in Alexandra by his grandmother whilst his parents stayed in the north of Johannesburg. He attended Highlands North Boys’ High School.

== Career ==
He started his DJ career at the early age of fourteen and producing at the age of sixteen. He started producing different music genres before he partnered with Josiah, who was also producing amapiano before their collaboration.

In March 2020, he released his first solo debut album 0303. The album featured singles such as "Askies", "Blue Skies" and "Hello Mo’Girl". His single "Askies" which featured singer Moonchild Sanelly and Fake Love was certified gold by RiSA. In August 2020, he released his first EP For The Babies which featured singers Kamo Mphela, Lady Du and Londie London. In October 2020, he released the album Maba Jabul’ Abantu, which was a collaboration with Busta 929 and featured artists like Reece Madlisa, Zuma, Mpura, Riky Rick and 9umber. In November 2020, he was featured on Busiswa's album My Side of The Story on the single "Makazi". In December 2020, he released the single "Umsebenzi Wethu".

He has performed on the channel O music television show, Lockdown House Party and in the finale of Idols South Africa Season 16.

On January 5, 2021, he released the single "Amaneighbour" which featured Killer Kau, Reece Madlisa, Zuma and ThackzinDJ. The single peaked #7 on Good Hope FM's Top 10 House Chart. He then released the single "Woza" which featured Lady Du, Boohle & Kabza De Small, and was also featured on Felo Le Tee's single "Nje Nje" alongside Reece Madlisa, Zuma, Mpura and Kabza De Small.

On 23 April 2021, he released his second album Party With The English. Mr JazziQ reflected on the inspiration behind the album:

"This is my first international push, even though I have been dropping music for a couple of years. I am extremely excited to introduce my work to the rest of the world. The genre is growing, and I want to take it to dancefloors around the globe".

On September 4, 2021, he performed live at the AmaFest Tour in the UK alongside local musicians Focalistic, Cassper Nyovest, DBN Gogo and Kamo Mphela.

On August 11, 2022, he released his third album All You Need Is Piano. The album features the duo Murumba Pitch, Mpura, Lady Du, Tsiki XII and F3 Dipapa.

== Discography ==
=== Studio albums ===
List of studio albums
Title	Album details
0303	Released: 3 March 2019; Label: MR JAZZIQ; Format: digital download, CD
For The Babies	Released: 21 August 2020; Label: Black Is Brown ENT; Format: digital download, CD
Party With The English	Released: 23 April 2021; Label: Black Is Brown ENT; Format: digital download
All You Need Is Piano	Released: 11 August 2022; Label: Black Is Brown ENT; Format: digital download
Coolest in the City	Released: 3 November 2026; Label: 2026 Mr JazziQ under exclusive license to ONErpm; Format: digital download

=== Collaborative albums ===
List of collaborative albums, with selected details and certifications
Title	Album details	Certifications
Maba Jabul'Abantu (with Busta 929)	Released: 2 October 2020; Label: Black Is Brown ENT; Formats: digital download, CD	

=== Singles ===
List of singles, with selected details and certifications
Title	Details	Certifications	Album
"Askies"	Released: 3 March 2020; Format: Digital download	RiSA: Gold	0303
"Blue Skies"	Released: 3 March 2020; Format: Digital download	—	0303
"Hello Mo’Girl"	Released: 3 March 2020; Format: Digital download	—	0303
"Amaneighbour"	Released: 5 February 2021; Format: Digital download	—	Non-album single

== Awards and nominations ==
Year	Award ceremony	Prize	Result
2021	Global Music Awards Africa	Producer of the Year	Nominated
2021	SA Amapiano Music Awards	Best Amapiano male DJ/Act	Nominated
2021	SA Amapiano Music Awards	Best Male Amapiano Artist	Won
2021	SA Amapiano Music Awards	Best Amapiano Collaboration	Won
2021	All Africa Music Awards	Best Male Artist in Southern Africa	Nominated
2021	African Muzik Magazine Awards	Music Producer of the Year	Nominated
