= Johannesburg Philharmonic Orchestra =

Orchestra in Johannesburg, South Africa

- Orchestra
- Founded: 2000
- Website: www.jpo.co.za

The Johannesburg Philharmonic Orchestra (JPO) is Johannesburg's leading Philharmonic Orchestra. The chair of the Board of Directors is Justice Dikgang Moseneke, and the CEO and Artistic Director is Bongani Tembe. Tembe was appointed in 2015. He combines this with his role as Artistic Director of the Kwazulu-Natal Philharmonic Orchestra.

The JPO presents four symphony seasons each year at the Linder Auditorium at the University of the Witwatersrand in Johannesburg. The orchestra has a community engagement programme, which sees it perform at schools in Soweto and other townships in Gauteng. The JPO also supports other music genres, including ballet and opera. One example is the Joburg Ballet's 2018 production of Carmen.

== Past achievements and activities ==
During 2000, JPO presented 15 concerts that included three overseas guest conductors as well as world-renowned overseas artists, such as Canadian-French pianist Jean Dubé and Russian-Italian master pianist Boris Petrushansky.

Since its inception, JPO has presented four seasons every year of symphonic music, mostly with the assistance of corporate sponsorship and individual donations and ticket sales.

In 2004, JPO released an internationally acclaimed, world-premiere recording of the Samuel Coleridge-Taylor Violin Concerto.

The JPO commissioned and, in March 2004, performed the world-premiere of A Mandela Portrait in recognition of 10 years of democracy in South Africa. The work was recorded and broadcast on 1 December 2004 - World Aids Day.

In addition to its symphony concerts, the JPO has performed: Queen: the Concert, The Joburg Pops, La Traviata and La Bohème for Opera Africa, Carmina Burana for the German Government's celebration of 10 years of democracy, and Fauré's Requiem'for RAU.

In 2007, JPO became a full-time orchestra with musicians on annual contracts. In 2009, JPO performed for the Inauguration of President Jacob Zuma at the Union Buildings. In 2009, JPO was awarded funding for a three-year period by the National Lottery Distribution Trust Fund. In 2009, JPO provided the recordings for the opening and closing ceremonies for the FIFA Confederations Cup. In 2010, JPO was asked to record for the FIFA World Cup opening and closing ceremonies.

== History ==
The Johannesburg Philharmonic Orchestra (JPO) was formed in 2000 by members of the disbanded National Symphony Orchestra. From 2000 until 2012 it presented four seasons of concerts per year. On September 1, 2006, Shadrack Bokaba was appointed managing director. The following year, its business model changed – as the orchestra moved from operating on an ad-hoc basis to becoming Gauteng's only permanent orchestra.

The company depended on funding by the public sector for sixty two (62) percent of its annual income, including from the Department of Arts and Culture and from the Lotteries. Other funding partners were from the private sector, including Anglo-American, JD Group and others. One of the successes during this time was the establishment of JPO Academy, which focused on training talented black African musicians. A four-year intensive orchestral programme was offered in partnership with the WITS School of music with the instrumental training provided by JPO musicians. At the end of 2012 the JPO reached another financial crisis which almost ended in liquidation. Mainly, this was due to the declining public sector income. JPO was placed in business rescue on 23 October 2012. A business rescue plan was presented and approved by creditors on 19 March of the following year. In 2013 JPO underwent a number of organizational changes and presented two seasons. Since then, the orchestra has put measures in place to secure its survival. Commercial recordings include the first recording of the Violin Concerto by Samuel Coleridge-Taylor.
