= Josiah De Disciple =

South African record producer

- Birth name: Josiah Makoela
- Also known as: Josiah De Disciple
- Born: 3 July 1991 (age 33); Alexandra, Gauteng, South Africa
- Genres: Amapiano
- Occupations: Record producer; DJ
- Years active: 2010–present
- Labels: SOM Records
- Formerly of: JazziDisciples

Josiah Makoela (born 3 July 1991) is a South African DJ and record producer commonly known as Josiah De Disciple. He is best known for his time with the Amapiano DJ duo, JazziDisciples, alongside Mr JazziQ. The duo split in 2018 to focus on their individual music careers.

He released his debut studio album Spirits of Makoela, Vol. 2: The Reintroduction, after Mr JazziQ's album Party with the English, which resulted in comparison between the record producers' projects.

His single "Mama", with Boohle from their collaborative album Umbuso Wabam'nyama, was certified gold by the Recording Industry of South Africa (RiSA).

== Discography ==
Studio albums

Title	Album details
Spirits of Makoela – Vol. 2: The Reintroduction	Release date: 2020; Label: SOM Records; Formats: Digital download

Collaborative albums

Title	Album details
Spirits of Makoela (with JazziDisciples)	Release date: 2020; Label: JazziDisciples; Format: Digital download, CD
Umbuso Wabam'nyama (with Boohle)	Release date: 2020; Format: Digital download
