= Soweto TV =

South African community television channel

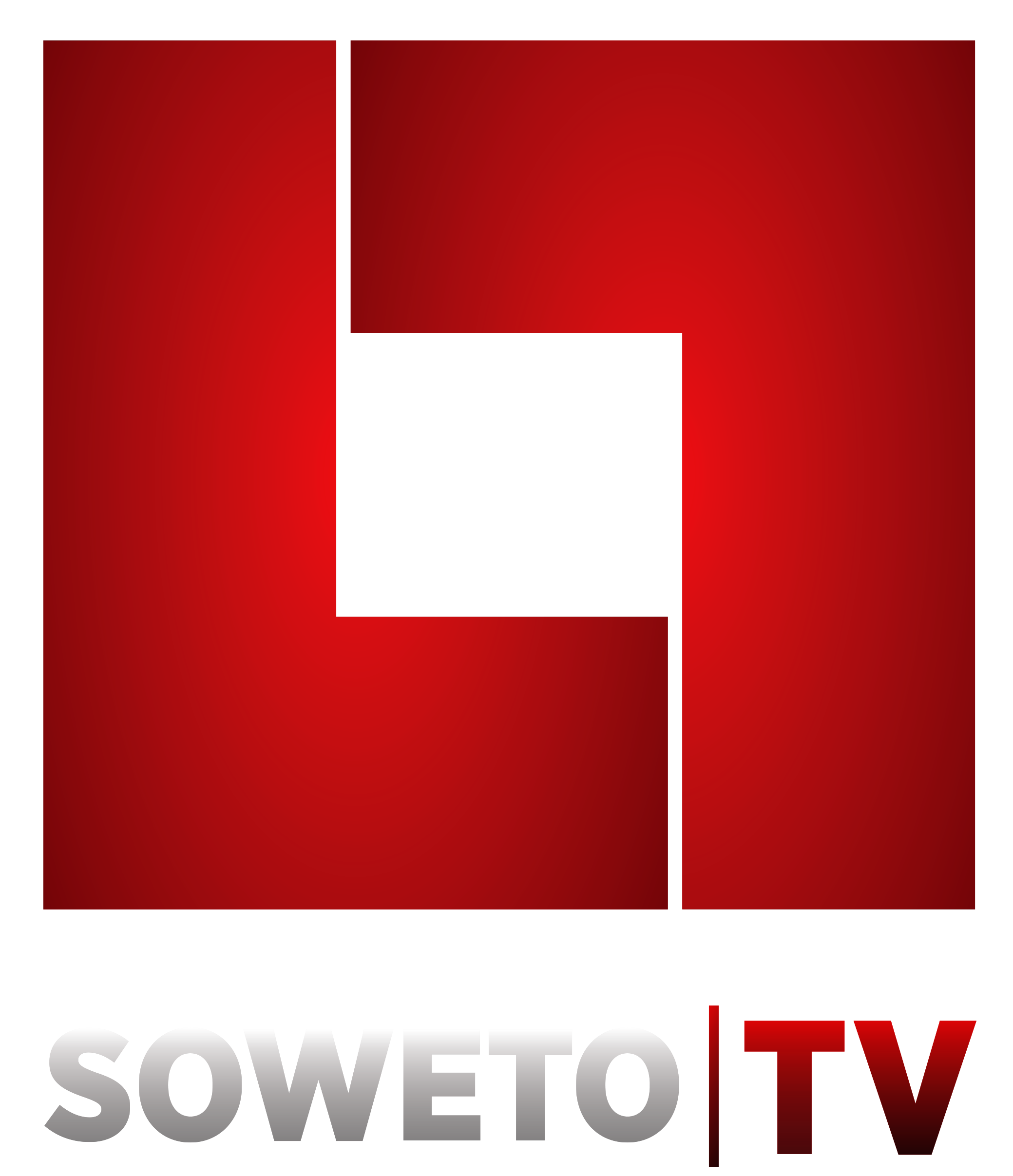
- Country: South Africa
- Broadcast area: Africa

Programming
- Language: Multilingual

History
- Launched: 26 November 2005
- Founder: Force Khashane and Ephraim Tshepo Thafeng

Links
- Website: www.sowetotv.co.za

Soweto Community Television (Soweto TV) is a South African community television channel broadcasting in Soweto. The channel is free-to-air in Gauteng Province and it also broadcasts to South African subscribers on the DStv pay TV service on channel 251 and Starsat on channel 488.

The channel's main studios are situated on Vilakazi Street. The channel also has studios in Diepkloof, near the Chris Hani Baragwanath Hospital.

== Early history ==
Soweto TV was founded in 2005 by Force Khashane, who was the Chapirperson of Soweto TV until his death in 2009; and also founded by Ephraim Tshepo Thafeng, who was then both the CEO and head of marketing for the community channel then. The channel received a 24-day special events broadcasting licence, from the Independent Communications Authority of South Africa (ICASA) which saw it broadcast eight hours a day, from 26 November 2005 till mid-December.

The month-long broadcast was themed, 'World Aids Day' which falls on 1 December. The Dobsonville Shopping Mall provided some funding for basic staff needs, while the state-owned SABC financed the studio and installation.

The channel received another special events broadcasting licence in 2006 and they completed another successful broadcast.

In 2007, the Soweto TV received a longer license for a year. The license meant the channel was live and uninterrupted for 24 hours a day from 1 July 2007 until 30 June 2008.

In May 2008, the channel submitted an application for a new licence, but the expiry date for the previous license, came and went without the channel receiving a new license due to a back-log at ICASA. The channel was allowed to continue broadcasting whilst ICASA was processing the application, though terms of the Electronic Communications Act of 2005, which stated that: "no-one may broadcast without a licence".

In 2010 the channel was granted its first seven-year broadcasting license by ICASA. Soon after, the channel announced a new chairman, Murphy Morobe, who was also the CEO of Kagiso Media. The channel, a non-profit entity, supported by Urban Brew Studios — a subsidiary of Kagiso Media.

In 2013 the channel went regional, with the installation of a new antenna. This meant viewers could watch Soweto TV across Gauteng. The station opened its spread on 16 June 2013. With the new antenna, Soweto TV reached Heidelberg, Benoni, Springs and Nigel in the east; Tembisa, Vanderbijlpark, Vereeniging and Sasolburg in the south; and Pretoria North and Mamelodi in the north

== Recent history ==
In August 2018, Soweto TV announced Bridget Nkuna as their new CEO. Nkuna had a stint at the former Voice of Soweto, now known as Jozi FM. She also worked for the SABC as a continuity presenter. With her marketing background and experience within the media space, she re-branded the channel and revealed the channel's new logo within a month. In October 2018 she revealed new state-of-the-art broadcasting equipment donated by MultiChoice.

On 30 June 2018, Thafeng tendered a formal resignation as board member of the channel. On 4 July 2019, he announced that he was cutting ties with the channel. Months later, the remaining board members would also resign from the board leaving only Tuis Jabulani Nkutha on the board, ICASA gave Nkutha and Nkuna a mandate to appoint people from the community to a steering committee that would be in charge at the channel for six months in preparation for the Annual General Meeting (AGM). It was alleged that Nkutha and Nkuna appointed their own preferred people to the board. Soon after the new board was appointed, Nkuna was placed on special leave. Board member, Thabo Molefe also known as Tbo Touch was then appointed the channel's acting CEO.

By the end of 2019, it was reported to ICASA that an illegitimate board had been appointed and was running the channel. Speaking to Sowetan LIVE in an article released on 17 January 2020,Thafeng said ICASA was fully aware of what's happening at the channel but was not doing anything about it. ICASA spokesperson Paseka Maleka confirmed receipt of a complaint in relation to the election of the board. During November 2021, it was announced that founder Thafeng had died.

On 6 January 2020, 9 Soweto TV producers were placed on suspension without being charged. About two weeks later they were charged with gross negligence or, failing to perform duties without proper cause, loss of revenue and viewership for the channel and failing to sign a performance contract during November 2019.

== Awards and nominations ==
- Winner of "Best Women in Media Professional - Nyiko Khosa" at the Global Brands Awards 2019
- Winner of "Best News Presenter - Lieketseng Tabi" at the Black Entertainment Awards 2019
- Winner of "Best News Entertainment Show - Kasi Vibes" at the Black Entertainment Awards 2019
- Winner of "Best Community TV Gospel Show - According to The Bible" at the 5th INGOMA 2018
- Winner of "Best Cultural Electronic Media Journalist - Sakhile Sithole" at the 13th SATMA 2018
- Winner of "Community Media of The Year" at the Gauteng Sports Awards 2018
- Winner of "Sports Programme of The Year - Dlala Mzansi - Vuyo Macoba, Malwandla Hlekane, Mbali Nkosi" at the Gauteng Sports Awards 2018
- Winner of "Best Gospel TV Show - Gospel Countdown" at the Crown Gospel Awards 2018
- Nominated for "Best Gospel TV Show - Apozion" at the Crown Gospel Awards 2018
- Nominated for "Best Gospel TV Show - Gospel Countdown" at the Crown Gospel Awards 2018
- Nominated for "Sport Programme of the Year - Dlala Mzansi - Vuyo Macoba, Malwandla Hlekane, Mbali Nkosi" at Gauteng Sports Awards 2017
- Winner of "M&G Community Media Journalist of the Year" at the Township Entrepreneurship Awards 2017
- Nominated for "Best Gospel TV Show - Gospel Countdown" at the Crown Gospel Awards 2017
- Winner of "Best Community Presenter - Ndumiso Dhlamini [Apozion]" at the 4th INGOMA 2017
- Winner of "Best Clap and Tap Music Show - Apozion" at the Mmino wa Clap and Tap Awards 2017
- Winner of "Community Media of The Year" at the KZN Capital Maskandi Awards 2017
- Winner of "Best Community TV Gospel Show" - Apozion" at the 4th INGOMA 2016
- Winner of "Best Gospel Show - Apozion" at the Crown Gospel Awards 2016
- Winner for "Community Media of The Year" at the Gauteng Sports Awards 2016
- Nominated for "Sports Programme of The Year - Dipapadi" at the Gauteng Sports Awards 2016
- Winner of "Best Gospel Show - According to The Bible" at the Crown Gospel Awards 2014

== Programming ==
Soweto TV programming is mostly Sowetan content as per ICASA's regulations of over 60% local content.

- According to The Bible - a religious show hosted by Lehlohonolo Patrick Ledwaba & Mtimande Lethukuthula
- Sisemoyeni - A gospel show hosted by Matthews Moloi
- Reggae Vibes - A reggae show hosted by Sipho "Ras Sipho" Mantula
- Kasi Kitchen - A cooking show hosted by Sinesipho Sihomo
- Kasi Vibes- A weekly music video show
- Apozion - A gospel show which plays Apostolic and Zion music from across the country
- Choral Sounds - A show that brings choral music from all over the world, hosted by Ndoni Radebe & Thabang Neko
- Edu-Space - An educational show hosted by Gugulethu Mtshali, that takes Soweto students into different universities and colleges
- Izigi Zomzansi - A traditional music show which takes viewers through a South African traditional musical journey
- News & Views - A current Affairs show hosted by broadcaster, Lucas Kgaphola
- Phaphama- A health show hosted by Phumelele Dlamini
- Soul Of Jazz - A Jazz and Rhythm & blues show hosted by Sibongile "Bongi M" Motlhasedi
- Ultimate Sistas - A talk show about feminism hosted by Dikeledi Tshabalala and Tsakane Mangwane
- Dlala Ngeringas - Hosted by Rufus "Dj Rhee" Moremi bringing together young people to discuss issues
- Your Late Mate - A variety show hosted by broadcaster Nimrod Nkosi
- MovieBox
- The Take Off - a daily breakfast show
- Rev It Up - a car review show
- Dlala Mzansi - a sports show created by Vuyo Macoba, Malwandla Hlekane and Mbali Nkosi, hosted by Lindokuhle Jiyane and Thembisile Baai
- The Mentality with Banele Rewo- Banele Rewo interviews Soweto’s Grootmans on how to navigate life as a man
