= Twerka =

Single by DJ Maphorisa, Shebeshxt and Xduppy
- Language: Sepedi; Zulu
- English title: Twerk
- Released: 18 December 2023
- Recorded: 7 December 2023
- Genre: Amapiano
- Length: 3:49
- Label: New Money Gang; SME Africa
- Composers: Themba Sekowe; Lehlogonolo Chauke
- Lyricists: Themba Sekowe; Lehlogonolo Chauke
- Producers: Themba Sekowe; Gomoelemo Joy Gumede

DJ Maphorisa singles chronology
"Bula Nthweo" (2023)	"Twerka" (2023)	"Monday Boys Holiday" (2023)

Shebeshxt singles chronology
"Shebe Re Tsamaya Le Wena" / "Dilala" (2023)	"Twerka" (2023)	"Makarapa" (2023)

Xduppy singles chronology
"10 past 4" (2023)	"Twerka" (2023)	"Monday Boys Holiday" (2023)

Audio sample
- file; help

"Twerka" is a single by a pair of South African DJs and record producers DJ Maphorisa and Xduppy, and rapper Shebeshxt released on 18 December 2023 through New Money Records under exclusive license from Sony Music Entertainment Africa. Despite amassing 14,000 streams a day prior to its release, it received critical reviews from the public.

DJ Maphorisa took to Instagram to inform fans that the song is out, however the public wasn't pleased with the final project as they negatively commented on the producer's post leading DJ Maphorisa to retaliate.

== Background ==
A live video of the artists in studio recording the song emerged on Twitter (now X) on 7 December 2023, it became a sleeper hit; going viral on a video sharing platform TikTok. Xduppy sampled Shebeshxt's freestyle from Podcast and Chill with MacG which received 1 million views in two days.

== Credits and personnel ==
- DJ Maphorisa – Primary artist, producer, songwriter
- Shebeshxt – Songwriter
- Xduppy – Producer
