= Miss Soweto =

- Formation: 1979; 47 years ago
- Founder: Ralph Zikalala and Leonard Sithole
- Headquarters: Orlando West
- Location: Soweto, South Africa
- Board of directors: Collin Sithole
- Parent organization: Miss Soweto

Miss Soweto, also known as White Star Miss Soweto for sponsorship reasons, is an annual beauty pageant for women in Soweto. The pageant has been held since 1979.

The current Miss Soweto is Lungile Siyaphi.

== Titleholders ==
Year	Miss Soweto	Runners-Up		Ref
Year	Miss Soweto	1st Princess	2nd Princess	Ref
2025	Lungile Siyaphi	Boitumelo Molotsana	Kutlwano Zingitwa	
2024	Mbali Khumalo	Onthathile Mohuba	Boitumelo Molotsane	
2023	Paige Harvey	Lethaukuthula Ayanda Maseko	Nhlakanipho Amandla Mkongi	
2022	Tsakane Sono	Fezile Ntloko	Karabo Legodi	
2021	Ludina Ngwenya	Ontshiametse Tlhopane	Thando Tshabalala	
2020	Thobile Steyn	Anathi Conjwa	Kutlaona Moloi	
2019	Musawenkosi Gumede	Thato Kubheka	Fhulufhelo Bilankulu	
2018	Nokukhanya Kunene	Nomfanelo Mabona	Zandile Lebuso	
2017	Busi Mmotla	Musawenkosi Makhalemele	Phumzile Nyembe	
2016	Nthabiseng Kgasi	Kamogelo Kodisang	Nokukhanya Kunene	
2015	Buhle Xulu	Nthabiseng Kgasi	Nokukhanya Kunene	
2014	Lungile Buhale	Kamogelo Kodisang	Keamogetswe Malotane	
2013	Makhanani Chabalala	Tsakane Magwani	Matsepo Kgoadi	
2012	Hape Moloi	Samkelisiwe Nkomonde	Viwe Gxwala	
2011	Lebogang Monggae	Khathutshelo Mphapela	Katlego Mohoaduba	
2010	Mangali Ngcobo	Liesl Laurie	Zanele Masuku	
2009	Keneilwe Maduko	Lerato Mokoena	Refiloe Motseng	
2008	Rochelle Mothapo	Dorah Mtetwa	Mbali Malekane	
2007	Lwandle Sikhakhane			
2006	Motshilisi Qoqwana			
2005	Lerato Kganyago			
2004	Karabo Medupe			
2003	Keitumetsi Mogemi			
2002	Razia Mdluli			
2001	Tebatso Hlatshwayo			
2000	Dorris Matlejoane			
1999	Deli Khoza			
1998	Sophia Mabusela			
1997	Dineo Tsolo			
1996	Nonkululeko Makapela			
1995	Nonhlanhla Simelane			
1994	Rethabile Matsike			
1993	Zanele Mahlangu			
1992	Thembi Mahlangu			
1991	Eunice Mogale			
1990	Basetsana Makgalemele			
1989	Charity Mofokeng			
1988	Pinkie Masemola			
1987	Augustine Masilela	Bongi Mlotshwa		
1986	Irene Molefe			
1985	Nkele Moema			
1984	Pauline Ratlou			
1983	Dorothy Hlabatau			
1982	Tilly Michaels			
1981	Thandi Vilakazi			
1980	Bliss Grootboom			
1979	Nomsa Hazel Mazibuko			

== History ==
The pageant was founded in 1979 by businessmen Ralph Zikalala and Leonard Sithole with Sithole running the pageant till 2013 before handing over the reigns to his son Collin Sithole.
