= Joburg Ballet =

Dance company in Johannesburg, South Africa

Joburg Ballet is a ballet dance company based within the Joburg Theatre, Johannesburg, South Africa. Joburg Ballet was formerly known as the South African Ballet Theatre (SABT). The company was formed in 2001 by six dancers who were retrenched by PACT Ballet. The company has been invited to perform in Russia in 2006 and has had exchange programmes with the Royal Swedish Ballet, the Royal Danish Ballet, the National Ballet of Canada, the Paris Opera and the San Francisco Ballet.

== About Joburg Ballet ==
Joburg Ballet is a full-time, professional ballet company, resident at Joburg Theatre in the heart of Johannesburg. Its repertoire includes full-length productions of major classical works, as well as shorter ballets, including original works created for the company by South African and international choreographers. The company presents three major seasons a year at Joburg Theatre, and also tours to other regions in South Africa and internationally. The company provides training for students via Joburg Ballet School and Academy, plus a programme of community-based development and outreach work via its Satellite Schools, with emphasis on historically disadvantaged communities.

The company’s Chief Executive Officer is Elroy Fillis-Bell and the Artistic Director is Dane Hurst. The company's Ballet Mistress is Kim Viera.

Joburg Ballet is supported by the Friends of the Ballet.

The company is made up of the following ranks: Principals, Senior Soloists, Soloists, Senior Corps de Ballet, Corps de Ballet, Junior Corps de Ballet and Aspirants.

== Board and Joburg Ballet Trust ==
As of January 2023, details of the Joburg Ballet Board and the South African Ballet Theatre Trust (SABTT) are as follows:

Honorary Life Patron: Annzie Hancock

Patron: Tito Mboweni

Board of Directors: Melanie de Nysschen (Chair), Lulu Letlape, Iain MacDonald (Artistic Director), Nkopane Maphiri, Adv. Jean Meiring, Lufuno Muthubi, Esther Nasser (CEO), Mr. Mavuso Shabalala Retrieved 14 January 2023.

Trust: Alastair Campbell, Chet Diepraam, Mbali Dlamini, Biddy Faber, Annzie Hancock (Chair), Iain MacDonald, Jenni Newman

== Repertoire ==
=== 2015 ===
- Swan Lake
- Don Quixote

=== 2016 ===
- Giselle
- Romeo and Juliet
- Cinderella

=== 2017 ===
- La Traviata - The Ballet
- Big City, Big Dreams, in collaboration with Vuyani Dance Theatre and Moving Into Dance Mophatong
- Snow White – The Ballet

=== 2018 ===
- Carmen, choreographed by Veronica Paeper and performed to a live orchestral accompaniment by the Johannesburg Philharmonic Orchestra
- Fire & Ice
- The Nutcracker
- Cinderella

== Status ==
Joburg Ballet is a registered charity.
