= Boksburg High School =

Coordinates: 26.2248°S 28.2549°E

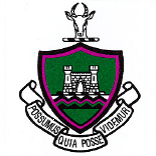
- Boksburg High School crest

Location
- Leeuwpoort Street; Boksburg, Gauteng; South Africa

Information
- Type: Public school
- Motto: Latin: Possumus quia posse videmur (We can because we believe we can)
- Established: 1920
- School district: Ekurhuleni South
- Principal: Mr E Thango
- Grades: 8–12
- Gender: Boys & Girls
- Age: 14 to 18
- Language: English
- Schedule: 07:30 - 14:00
- Campus: Urban Campus
- Colours: Green; Purple; White
- Rival: Hoërskool Voortrekker
- Accreditation: Department of Basic Education
- Yearbook: Essence of Boksburg High School
- Houses: Gauls, Celts, Picts and Scots

Boksburg High School is a public high school in Boksburg, a suburb of Ekurhuleni, South Africa. The school was founded in 1920 as the Rand East Training and Preparatory College under its first Principal, Mr Charter. In 1925, the school changed its name to Boksburg High School. Over the years, substantial additions to the campus grounds were made such the absorption of Leeuwpoort Primary School . The school has had seven Principals over its nearly 100 years history and its enrollment rate expanded from the first class of the REPTC which consisted of 13 students, to approximately 1600 students as of 2019, acceptance to which being highly sought after with the school often receiving more applications for admission than places available. The school is among the top performing schools in its district.

== Governance ==
As other South African public schools, Boksburg High School is constituted and governed in terms of the South African Schools Act (No. 84 of 1996). It is under the authority of the Department of Basic Education through the provincial Gauteng Department of Education. It falls under the Ekurhuleni South education district.

The chief executive officer of the school is the Principal (also known as the Headmaster if male and Headmistress if female). This position is currently held by Mr E Thango. He succeeded Mrs Haahjem who was the interim Principal. Mrs Boshoff was the first female Principal of the school. She assumed the role upon the resignation of the previous Principal, Mr J. H. Du Plessis in 2016. Faculty members are divided by discipline into academic departments overseen by a Head of Department (HOD). Each grade is overseen by an Academic Grade Administrator and each academic class is assigned an Academic Class Administrator.

The School Governing Body (SGB), composed of parents and teachers elected by the Parent Teacher Association (PTA) every year and one of two Directors (the Headboy and Head Girl) who serve as ex officio members, carries out the daily management of the school. It decides on school policies such as those governing exclusion and admission. Besides electing the SGB, the PTA provides a platform for teachers and parents to deliberate on important issues and decide on key topics such as tuition fees.

Student representation is provided by the Representative Council of Learners. The council is co-chaired by the two Directors, under whom are eight deputy directors who act as House Captains. The executive committee is elected by and composed of grade 12 (or matric) students, of which the Directors and deputy directors are the highest-ranking members. Each House elects an equal number of members to the executive committee.

== Academics ==
The school acts as an examination centre and provides teaching for the South African National Senior Certificate school-leaving matriculation qualification under the accreditation of the Council for Quality Assurance in General and Further Education of South Africa also known as Umalusi. It provides teaching in the following subject: Accounting, Afrikaans First Additional Language, Design, Economics, Engineering Graphical Design, English Home Language, Geography, History, Life Sciences, Life Orientation, Physical Sciences, Mathematics, Mathematical Literacy, Physical Sciences, Tourism, Visual Arts, Consumer Studies.

The school has had consistent and positive academic performance. It came in the top ten of the Ekurhuleni South education district for the past few years, its students have had the top ten marks in subjects in the district, province and nationally, and its teachers have been awarded for having some of the highest number of subject distinctions in the district. Moreover, the school has had over 95% of students pass the NSC final examinations for many years.

== Location ==
The school's single campus is bounded by Leeuwpoort Street to the north, Trichardt Road to the west, Albu Road to the east and Dickens Street to the south. It lies in close proximity to a number of public amenities such the Boksburg CBD Taxi Rank (which lies to the northwest), Ekurhuleni Municipality Boksburg Customer Care Center and the Boksburg Public Library. The school lies close to other public and private schools in the surrounding area such as Christian Brothers College (which lies to the east across Albu Road) and Voortrekker High School (which lies several streets to the north). The Ekurhuleni scholastic bus service provides transportation to the school across a number of routes around Boksburg.

== Facilities ==
The school campus features a wide array of academic, sport and general facilities and amenities. The School Hall facing Leeuwpoort Street across the Matric Brick gardens and paved area features a proscenium stage with backstage dressing rooms for dramatics and other performances and school events and gatherings. Most buildings are organised in quadrangles around a paved or gardened courtyard. Prefabricated classrooms provide additional teaching space.

The central administrative functions are carried out from and the main offices are located in the Admin Block, in front of which the school flag flies. The Finance Block adjacent to the Acheson Quadrangle houses the finance department. The tallest building on campus, the Library sits in the Acheson Quad. The Indoor Sports Centre, housed in the Charter Quadrangle, is a venue for winter sports games and practice matches such as indoor hockey.

Across the concrete hockey slab on the Leeuwpoort Quadrangle, lies the Old Mutual Mathematics Centre. The centre provides teaching space and additional facilities dedicated to Mathematics and Mathematical Literacy subjects. The school has a WiFi network which connects teachers to online resources and support. Students can access similar services in dedicated computer centres such as the one in the Taylor Quadrangle. Some classes have computers and specialised software for students in specific subject disciplines such as the software used in the teaching of Geography students.

== Houses ==
The School's houses are Celts, Gauls, Picts and Scots represented by the colours red, purple, green and yellow or gold respectively. The school house system was founded early in the school's history, based on similar systems prevalent in English schools. They were based on European tribes. Each house is overseen by a Dean who is assisted by one or more Deputy Deans. Students are grouped according to classes assigned to a teacher (faculty member) who is a member of that house. Each class elects a Class Representative who is a member of the RCL. Matric students elect tw′o House Captains who act as deputy directors on the executive committee of the RCL and they elect other members of the executive committee of the RCL as well. All houses have equal representation except when one or both of the Directors come from that House.

Houses participate and compete in inter-house cultural and sports competitions against each other such as the Inter House Athletics competition and the Grade 8 Revue. The aggregate performance of each House over the academic year is totalled across four categories (spirit, academics, sport and culture) and ranked at the end of the year. The best house overall is awarded the Viking Cup, while the best house(s) in academics, sport, spirit and culture are awarded the Polaris, Gladiator, Valkyrie and Havamal Cups respectively. Each house holds an assembly at least once a week should the weather permit in one of the school's quadrangles on an annual rotation in which important announcements are made, cheers and chants are rehearsed, registers are taken, and dress and hair are inspected, among other activities.

== Notable alumni ==
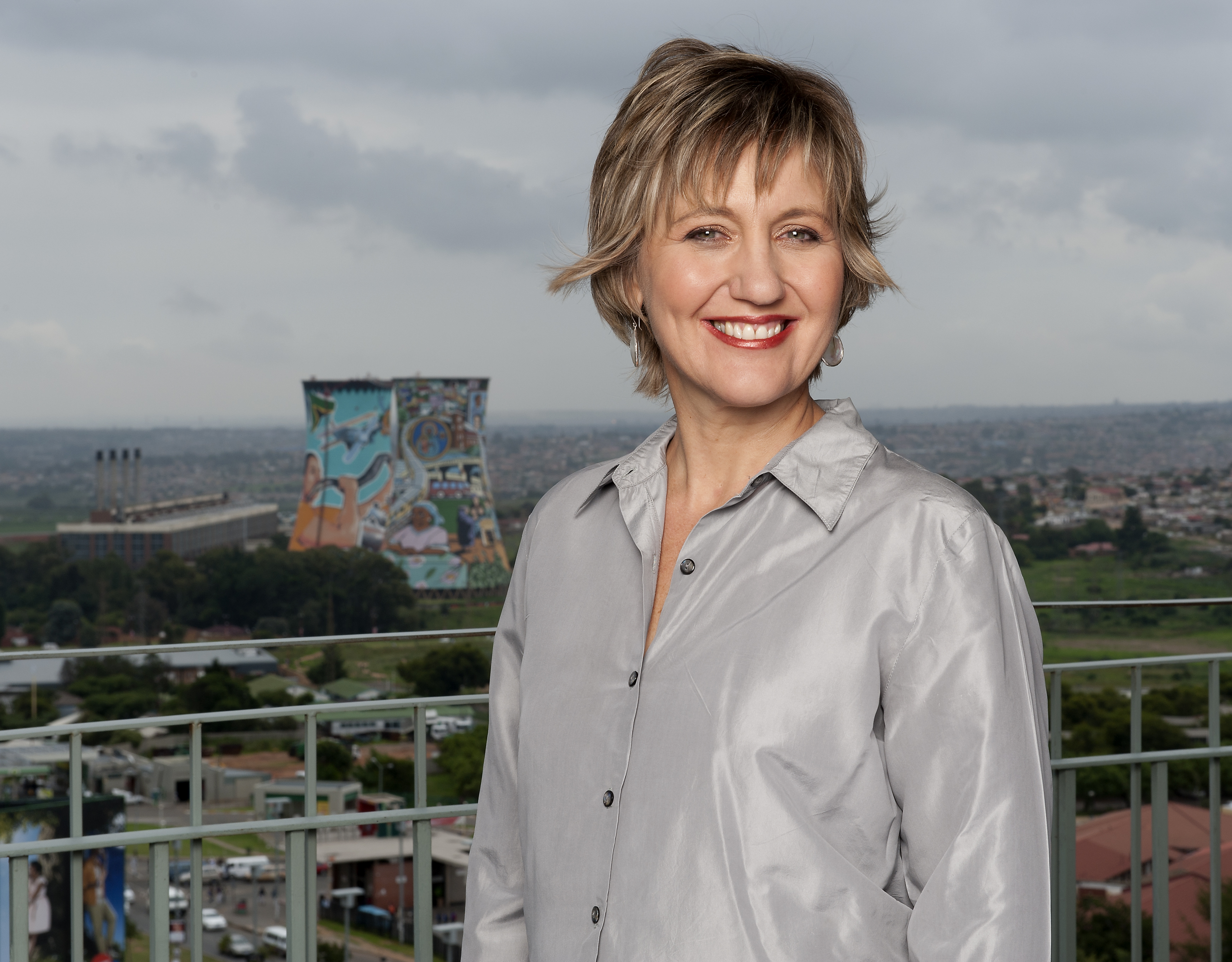
Glenda Gray

- Glenda Gray - Chairperson of the South African Medical Research Council, recipient of the Order of Mapungubwe (Silver)
- Lerato Marabe - South African actress known for her role in the SABC1 television drama Skeem Saam.
- Lerato Kganyago - Media personality and television presenter, Golden Horn Award winner.
- Vanessa Cilliers - Miss South Africa 2001 pageant winner.
