= Naledi Aphiwe =

South African singer-songwriter

- Also known as: Naledi Aphiwe
- Born: Naledi Aphiwe Myongwane; Inanda, KwaZulu Natal, South Africa
- Origin: South Africa
- Genres: Hip-hop
- Occupation: Singer-songwriter
- Instrument: Vocals
- Years active: 2025–present
- Label: Virgin Music Group

Naledi Aphiwe Myongwane is a South African singer from Inanda, KwaZulu-Natal. While attending Khethokuhle Secondary School, Naledi rose to prominence after her voice was sampled on "Shooter" on 11:11 studio album by Chris Brown in 2023.

== Career ==
In 2024, she earned her first nominations for Collaboration of the Year, Song of The Year, and won Soft 'n Free Pop Artist of the Year at the 2024 Basadi in Music Awards.

Towards the end of January 2025, Naledi signed a recording deal with Virgin Music Group.

== Tours ==
=== Supporting ===
- The 11:11 Tour (2024)

== Singles ==
=== As lead artist ===
List of singles as lead artist, with selected chart positions and certifications, showing year released and album name
Title	Year	Peak chart positions	Certifications	Album
Title	Year	ZA	Certifications	Album
"Uyangijabulisa" (Fezeka Dlamini, Naledi, Nomfundo Moh)	2023	—		Non-album single
"Ngiyabonga"	2024	—		Non-album single
"Ubaba Ulala Nami" (DoppyBeatz, Naledi Aphiwe)	2024	—		Non-album single
"Ngifuna Wena" (featuring Child Dadj)	2024	—		Non-album single
"Romeo & Juliet" (Naledi Aphiwe, Mawelele)	2025	—		Non-album single
"—" denotes a recording that did not chart or was not released in that territory.

=== As featured artist ===
List of singles as featured artist, with selected chart positions and certifications, showing year released and album name
Title	Year	Peak chart positions	Certifications	Album
Title	Year	ZA	Certifications	Album
"Dali" (Ayarhkay featuring Okuhle, Naledi Aphiwe)	2023	—		Non-album single
"Izithukuthuku" (Nonny Ntuli featuring Maverick Muji & Naledi Aphiwe)	2024	—		Non-album single
"—" denotes a recording that did not chart or was not released in that territory.

== Awards and nominations ==
=== Basadi in Music Awards ===
Year	Nominee / work	Award	Result	Ref.
2024	Uyangijabulisa	Collaboration of the Year	Nominated	
2024	"Ngiyabonga"	Sofnfree Afro Pop Artist of the Year	Won	
2024	"Ngiyabonga"	Song of the Year	Nominated	
2025	"Ngiyabonga"	Music Video of the Year	Nominated	
2025	"Romeo & Juliet"	Afropop Artist of the Year	Won	
