= Nia Pearl =

South African singer-songwriter

- Born: Peleka Lwana; 25 December 1990 (age 35); Mthatha, Eastern Cape
- Origin: Eastern Cape, South Africa
- Genres: Amapiano; Afro-pop; Soul
- Occupations: Singer; songwriter
- Instrument: Vocals
- Years active: 2017–present
- Label: Universal Music South Africa

Peleka Lwana (born 25 December 1990), known professionally as Nia Pearl, is a South African singer and songwriter. She gained popularity for her collaborations with South African Amapiano producers such as DJ Maphorisa and Kabza De Small.

== Early life and education ==
Nia Pearl was born and raised in Mthatha, Eastern Cape, where she grew up in a family of six sisters and was raised by a father in a close-knit family. She was inspired by her sisters to start writing her own songs. She graduated in 2013 after completing her degree in music. After completing her studies, she began carving her path into music industry.

== Career ==
In 2014, she performed at The Standard Bank Joy of Jazz festival in Johannesburg. She also participated in the Castle Milk Stout music competition organized by Metro FM. In 2015, she performed at The Nescafe Red Mugg sessions. In April 2017, she released her debut single Liberty which featured SAMA award winning musician Kabomo. Later that same year, she released her single, "Yiza", which was produced by renowned soul and jazz producer Luyanda Madope. The release of the single was accompanied by a video that featured guest artist Mapele. Nia Pearl was also featured in the Sho Madjozi single titled "User Busy".

In 2020, she collaborated with Kabza De Small on the album, I Am the King of Amapiano, in which she featured on five songs from the project.

== Discography ==
=== Singles and EPs ===
Title	Type	Album details
Dreamers & Believers	EP	Release date: 2021; Label: NEW MONEY GANG (with exclusive license from Sony Music Africa); Formats: Digital download

=== Collaborative projects ===
Title	Type	Album details
TRINITY (with Nicole Elocin & Bontle Smith)	EP	Release date: 2022; Label: NEW MONEY GANG (exclusively distributed under Sony Music Africa); Formats: Digital download
Shela(with Boohle, Sam deep ft Mano)		Release date: 2025
