= Kasie FM 97.1 =

Ekurhuleni; South Africa
- Frequency: 97.1 MHz

Links
- Website: kasiefm971.co.za

Kasie FM is a South African community radio station based in Ekurhuleni. It was founded in 1997, but started broadcasting full-time late 2007.

== Coverage areas ==
- Eastern Ekurhuleni
- Southern Ekurhuleni
- Boksburg
- Alberton
- Germiston
- Thokoza
- Katlehong
- Vosloorus
- Parts of Eastern Johannesburg
- North of Vereeniging
- Wattville
- KwaTsaduza

== Broadcast languages ==
- English
- SeSotho
- Zulu Slang

== Broadcast time ==
- 24/7

== Target audience ==
- LSM Groups 2 – 7
- Age Group 16 - 49
- The community at large

== Programme format ==
- 60% Music
- 40% Talk

== Listenership Figures ==
Estimated Listenership
| | 7 Day |
|---|---|
| Dec 2016 | 200 000 |
| Feb 2013 | 160 000 |
| Dec 2012 | 133 000 |
| Oct 2012 | 119 000 |
| Aug 2012 | 119 000 |
| Jun 2012 | 141 000 |
