= Mthunzi =

Mthunzi is a name, meaning "shade" or "shadow" in Zulu. Notable people with the surname include:

- Corbin Mthunzi (born 2007), Zimbabwean footballer
- Mthunzi (singer) (born 1992), South African singer-songwriter and producer
- Mthunzi Mkhontfo (born 1994), IisWati footballer
- Mthunzi Ntoyi (born 1986), South African actor
- Mthunzi Vilakazi (1955-2000), South African politician
- Patience Mthunzi-Kufa (born 1976), South African physicist and researcher
