= Unathi Nkayi =

South African singer, radio host and actress

Unathi Fundiswa Msengana
- Born: Unathi Nkayi; November 6, 1978 (age 47); Grahamstown, Eastern Cape, South Africa
- Genres: pop; afro-pop; rnb
- Occupations: singer; radio host; actress
- Instrument: vocals
- Years active: 2004–present
- Label: Universal
- Spouse: Thomas Msengana (m. 2009; div. 2017)

Unathi Fundiswa Msengana (born 6 November 1978) professionally known as Unathi Nkayi is a South African singer, radio host and actress. Born in Grahamstown, Eastern Cape, Unathi graduated with Degree in International Media Studies at the University of Utrecht.

She also obtained Degree in Journalism and Drama at Rhodes University in 2000. Shortly after she completed her studies, Nkayi relocated to Johannesburg in 2001 and began her television career as a host of Castle Loud, prior hosting on YFM as radio presenter. Unathi became co-host of Popstars in 2004 with Rowan Cloete.

Following year, Unathi won Most Promising Woman in Media award at the MTN Media Awards.

Her debut studio album In Honour, was released on 4 January 2008. The album won Best Female Vocalist at 2008 Metro FM Music Awards.

In 2011, She landed on role of a judge of Idols South Africa M-Net reality competition.

Unathi earned her first nomination for Favourite South African Radio DJ at the 27th ceremony of Nickelodeon Kids Choice Awards.

In 2014, Unathi won Glamour Woman of the Year at the Media Star.

In June 2014, she bagged a character role of Rita the Cheetah on Doc McStuffins, Disney Junior series.

Unathi studio album Brave, True and Strong, was released on 17 September 2017. It became her commercial successful album sold out in one week.

In September 2018, she announced Brave, True and Strong Tour that ran from 18 August to 20 September.

In November 2021, Unathi bagged a role of hosting The Festive Get Together in The Life Artois on Mzansi Magic for two consecutive seasons.

Unathi was announced as the host of STAR 91.9 FM's All Star Drive alongside Justin Toerien in February 2022.

She hosted GQ's Best Dressed Awards 2022 in August 2022 held at 92 Rivonia in Sandton.

In December 2022, Unathi hosted GQ Man of the Year Awards alongside Donovan Goliath.

In early January 2024, Unathi was announced as the host of 2024 Basadi in Music Awards for the second time held at the Joburg Theatre.

== Discography ==
=== Studio albums ===
- In Honour (2008)
- Brave, True and Strong (2017)

== Filmography ==
Television
Year	Title	Role	Notes
2004	Popstars	Host	Season 3
2010-2022	Idols	Judge	Season 7–17
2016	Living the Dream with Somizi	Herself	
2012	The Close Up	Herself	Season 2
2012	The South African Music Awards	Presenter	Season 18
2012	The Comedy Central Roast	Herself	Season 1
2014	Galaxy of Stars	Host	Season 1
2017	Miss South Africa	Judge	Season 60

== Personal life ==
Her parents are Sakhiwo and Nondwe Nkayi.

Unathi married Thomas Msengana in September 2009. The couple had two children, Sinako and Imbo Msengana. Unathi divorced her husband in 2017.
