= Lerato Kganyago =

South African DJ, Miss Soweto 2002, actress and media personality

- Kganyago in 2019
- Born: Lerato Kganyago; 22 July 1982 (age 44); Soweto, South Africa
- Other name: LKG
- Occupations: Actress, Model, Media personality and Miss Soweto 2002
- Years active: 2002–present
- Spouse: Thami Ndlala (m. 2020)

Lerato Kganyago (born 22 July 1982), also known as LKG, is a South African actress, model and media personality she is also known as the Queen of Soweto after winning Miss Soweto,a beauty pageant in 2002. She is best known for the roles in the films. Apart from that, she is also a MC, entrepreneur, model, and a DJ.

== Personal life ==
Kganyago was born on 22 July 1982 in Soweto, South Africa. She attended Ipolokeng Primary School and did her high school years at Boksburg High School. After completing high school, she studied Public Relations and Travel and Tourism at Damelin College. After that, she worked as a flight attendant for Qatar Airways.

In 2009, she started dating Bafana Bafana player, Katlego Mashego. They were later engaged in 2013. However, the relationship ended due to allegations of Katlego cheating. Lerato has opened up that she suffered 4 miscarriages in the past. In March 2020 she married Thami Ndlala, they divorced after two months of tying the knot. But he proposed to her again on her birthday just a few months later.

== Career ==
She started her career in modeling. In 2002, she was crowned as Miss Jam Alley. Then in 2005, she won the Miss Soweto Pageant as well. After a stint at Qatar Airways, she joined to Soweto TV as a television host, and presented her own talk show called The LKG Show. During this period, she was also selected as the face of SABC1 lifestyle entertainment show, The Link. In 2015, she returned to host the radio program "DJ Sbu" on Metro FM after causing a conflict with another host. After that, she hosted many television programs such as; LIVE AMP, and The Link. In 2015, she was named as a host of the SAMAs pre-show. In July 2015, she made entrance on Ebony Life TV, where she was named as the South African host along with Pearl Thusi for the program "Moments".

She started her acting career on The Phat Joe Show, where she performed comedic skits. After that, she made appearances on the South African TV series Muvhango (2015), Play: Sex Tips for Girls, and The Wild. She later joined and hosted radio programs at Jozi FM. After that, she was invited to host a slot on the popular radio station "Metro FM". She co-hosted a show with Bonang Matheba, which later became controversy and eventually Matheba resigned from the radio station. However, in 2017, they rejoined and co-hosted the show Front Row at Metro FM. But Matheba departed again from the station hours later.

She currently owns event management company called "Black Angel".

In May 2022, she announced her partnership with Johnnie Walker.

In October 2024, Lerato along with Skhumba Hlophe was announced as the host of 18th South African Film and Television Awards to be held in Midrand, Johannesburg.

In April 2026, Kganyago hosted 20th Metro FM Music Awards alongside with Lawrence Maleka held at the Durban ICC (Inkosi Albert Luthuli International Convention Centre) in Durban.

== Accolades ==
Year	Nominee/Work	Category	Results	Ref.
2017	Herself	Best TV Presenter	Won	
2022	Herself	Entertainment Radio Presenter of the Year	Won	
2026	Herself	DJ of the Year	Pending	
2026	Metro FM - Midday Link-Up	Entertainment Radio Presenter of the Year	Pending	
