= JazziDisciples =

South African Amapiano duo

- Origin: Johannesburg, South Africa
- Genres: Amapiano; House; Deep House
- Years active: 2017–2020
- Labels: JazziDisciples ENT
- Past members: Mr JazziQ; Josiah De Disciple

JazziDisciples were an amapiano DJ and producer duo originating from South Africa. They were composed of two record producers known by their stage names Mr JazziQ and Josiah De Disciple.

== History ==
JazziDisciples' music group members are originally from Alexandra, north of Johannesburg. Their interest in music started at a very early age. They are known for their songs such as Long Lasting, Sgubu Se Monati and their encompassing tag line Amapiano is a lifestyle.

The duo have since their debut performed on top music festivals such as Afropunk Festival, Corona SunSets Festival and YTKO 32 Hour Fest and have shared a stage with local artists in the industry, such as Cassper Nyovest and Black Coffee.

They have appeared on various shows such as the Lockdown House Party on Channel O and festivals in South Africa. They have also had various television and radio appearances and have also had various club and lounge appearances.

On the 1st of November 2019, they released their first studio album titled Disciples of Piano. The album featured collaborations from local musicians such as Okmalumkoolkat, Vigro Deep, Nomisupasta and DJ Buckz.

The duo has also received recognition and nominations for their songs. In 2019, they were nominated for Best Amapiano record at the Dance Music Awards South Africa.

To further expand the duo's sound and vision in 2020 they released solo projects. In March 2020 JazziDisciples released Mr JazziQ's EP titled 0303, which featured vocalist Moonchild Sanelly. Josiah De Disciple's EP titled SOM (Spirits Of Makoela) was released in May 2020.

== Musical style ==
They create dance music containing elements of afro house, house and world music, combining live instruments such as bass, saxophones, keyboards, percussions, flute, and vocals with samplers, effects and synths.

== Band members ==
=== Former acts ===
- Tumelo Manyoni – basslines, kicks, vocals
- Josiah Makoela – melodies, chords, drums, piano

== Awards and nominations ==
JazziDisciples was nominated as Best Amapiano Record at the 2019 Dance Music Awards South Africa.

== Discography ==
- Black Child XXV (2018)
- Bafana Ba Numba (2018)
- The Load Shedding (2018)
- IOP EP (2019)
- Disciples Of Piano (2019)
- Spirits Of Makoela 1 (2020)
- 0303 (2020)
