= Zee Nxumalo =

South African singer-songwriter

- Born: Zandile Nxumalo; 6 January 2003 (age 23); South Africa
- Origin: South Africa
- Genres: Amapiano, 3-Step,
- Occupation: Singer-songwriter-producer
- Instrument: Vocals Producer
- Years active: 2022–present
- Label: KWA NXUMALO
- Website: https://izinjazam.com/

Zandile Nxumalo (born 6 January 2003) professionally known as Zee Nxumalo, is a Swazi-South African singer and songwriter. Her single "Funk 55", released in 2023, catapulted her to mainstream success and was certified 5× Platinum in South Africa.

== Early life ==
Zandile Nxumalo was born on 6 January 2003 in Eswatini. Her family relocated to Alexandra, Johannesburg where she spent her childhood.

== Career ==
Her debut extended play KwaNxumalo, was released on 28 June 2022. "Funk 55" by Shakes & Les, DBN Gogo and Zee Nxumalo featuring Ceeka RSA and Chley was released on 1 December 2023. It debuted at No. 2 on the Local Streaming Chart Top 10. Her single Thula Mabota with Pabi Cooper and 031choppa, featuring Shakes & Les. was released on 29 March 2024. It was certified platinum in South Africa.

She also appeared on Ama Gear with Dlala Thukzin and Funky QLA, featuring MK Productions, released on 5 July 2024. The song debuted at number 5 on the Local Streaming Top 10. In early October 2024, she announced her extended play Inja Ye Game, released on November 15, 2024. "Malume" with Djy Biza and 031 Choppa, featuring Springle and DJ Tira, was released on October 26, 2024, as the lead single.

== Singles ==
=== As lead artist ===
List of singles as lead artist, with selected chart positions and certifications, showing year released and album name
Title	Year	Peak chart positions	Certifications	Album
Title	Year	ZA	Certifications	Album
"Siyajola"	2022	—		KwaNxumalo
"Hamba"	2022	—		KwaNxumalo
"Sobabili" (Zee Nxumalo, Profound, MFR Souls)	2023	—		KwaNxumalo (Deluxe)
" Funk 55" (Shake & Les, DBN Gogo, Zee Nxumalo featuring Ceeka RSA, Chley)	2023	1	5× Platinum	Funk Series
"Uyang'user" (Tranquillo, Zee Nxumalo, Khanyisa featuring Chley & Rif effect)	2024	—		Non-album single
"Thula Mabota" (Zee Nxumalo, Pabi Cooper, 031choppa featuring Shakes & Les)	2024		Platinum	Non-album single
"Chengu Shesha" (DJ Tshegu, Leemckrazy, Zee Nxumalo featuring Al Xapo, Vyno Keys & QuayR Musiq)	2024	—		
"Abantu" (Piano City, Marlode & Owams, Zee Nxumalo featuring Leemckrazy, FLUXX)	2024	—		
"Ama Gear (Edit)" (Dlala Thukzin, Funky Qla, Zee Nxumalo featuring MK Productions)	2024	5		Non-album single
"Ngisakuthanda" (featuring PYY Log Drum King, Dj Tearz, Dr Thulz)	2024	1	RiSA: 3× platinum	Inja Ye Game
"Malume" (Zee Nxumalo, Djy Biza, 031 Choppa featuring Springle, DJ Tira)	2024	—		Inja Ye Game
"Inja Ye Game"	2024	—		Inja Ye Game
"THE GRIMACE SHAKE" (Grimace, Zee Nxumalo)	2024	—		Non-album single
"Yonke Into" (Reece Madlisa, Zee Nxumalo & M00tion)	2025	_		Everything Is On Me
"Balele" (Sjavasdadeejay, DJ Maphorisa & Zee Nxumalo featuring Xduppy, Madumane & Dutch)		_		Non-album single
"Ngisakuthanda [3-step Remix]" (Dr Thulz, Zee Nxumalo & TBO)		_		Non-album single
"Ngisakuthanda (Edit)" (Zee Nxumalo, TBO & PYY Drum Log King)				Non-album single
"Imnandi" (N.I.D Muziq, Zee Nxumalo & RIVALZ)		_		Non-album single
"Sajola Kamnandi" (Sminofu & Zee Nxumalo)		49	RISA: Gold	Non-album single
"Hamba" (DJ Obza & Zee Nxumalo)		_		
"U'Spongè" (Zee Nxumalo featuring Gino Brown)		_		Non-album single
"In & Out" (Raluka, Millforlife & Zee Nxumalo)		_		Non-album single
"Bhampa" (Vigro Deep, Zee Nxumalo & Ch'cco)		30		Non-album single
"Rato Laka" (Shebeshxt, Naqua SA & Zee Nxumalo featuring Slidoo Man		23		Non-album single
"In & Out (ReMan Remix)" (Raluka, Millforlife, Zee Nxumalo & ReMan)		_		Non-album single
"Mamma" (Zee Nxumalo, Skillz & Sykes)		5	RiSA: 2x platinum	Non-album single
"—" denotes a recording that did not chart or was not released in that territory.
"Awe mha"(Zee Nxumalo ,Official visualiser ft Dlala Thukzin ,Funky QLA,Shakes&Les,MK products	2026			

=== As featured artist ===
List of singles as featured artist, with selected chart positions and certifications, showing year released and album name
Title	Year	Peak chart positions	Certifications	Album
Title	Year	ZA	Certifications	Album
"Hai Kabi" (Jovislash featuring Zee Nxumalo)	2022	—		
"Jabula" (ProSiRa featuring Zee Nxumalo)	2022	—		
"Asim'bonanga" (DJ Stresser Given Kanu, Finomol featuring Zee Nxumalo, Thatohatsi Vocals, Jaz & Csqo)	2023	—		
"SHAYIMOTO" (Zulu Makhathini featuring Zee Nxumalo)	2023	—		
"SHAYIMOTO 2.0" (Zulu Makhathini featuring Zee Nxumalo, PRVIS3, Kweyama Brothers, Triple X Da Ghost)	2023	—		
"Inkululeko" (DJ Tira, Heavy-K featuring Makhadzi, Zee Nxumalo, Afro Brothers)	2024	—		
"Rise" (Faizal featuring The Real Prechly, Dj Guti BPM, Tega Boi DC, Berri-Tiga, Carterefe, Hotkid, Poco Lee, Goldie, Zee Nxumalo)	2024	—		
"FOMO" (GildMax, Dlala Thukzin, Funky Qla featuring Zee Nxumalo, Beast Rsa)	2024	—		
"Propella" (Faizal featuring The Real Prechly, Dj Guti BPM, Tega Boi DC, Berri-Tiga, Carterefe, Zee Nxumalo, Poco Lee, Ggoldie, Hotkid)	2024	—		Non-album single
"Pholoba" (Danger Flex featuring Zee Nxumalo, Dj Mpiczah)	2024	—		Non-album single
"Abo Gogo" (Ziibeats, 031choppa, Shakes & Les featuring Zee Nxumalo)	2024	—		Non-album single
"Rockstar" (Bjørn Vidø featuring Zee Nxumalo, Mac J)	2024	—		Non-album single
"Mfazi Wephepha" (Nkosazana Daughter, Master KG featuring Big Zulu, Zee Nxumalo)	2024	4		Makhelwane
"Life Of The Party" (Nasty C, Lekaa Beats, Daliwonga featuring Zee Nxumalo, Yumbs)	2024	—		Confuse The Enemy
"Iskhathi" (Danger flex featuring Zee Nxumalo, Msongi, Ama Grootman, SeeZus Beats)	2024	—		Non-album single
"Samba Sonke 2.0" (Karabo Small, Noxx, Tyler ICU featuring Zee Nxumalo, Kailey Botman, Tyrone Dee, AI Xapo)		—		Non-album single
"Amabomu" (DJ Maphorisa & Xduppy featuring Daliwonga, Zee Nxumalo, CowBoii & Blxckie)	2025	_		Rough Dance
"Hlangene" (DJ Maphorisa, Xduppy & Zee Nxumalo featuring Daliwonga)		_		Rough Dance
"—" denotes a recording that did not chart or was not released in that territory.

== Discography ==
=== Extended plays ===
- KwaNxumalo (2022)
- Inja Ye Game (2024)
- Izinja Zam (Vol.1) [with Dlala Thukzin] (2026)

=== Guest appearances ===
Title	Year	Other artist(s)	Album
"Life of the Party"	2024	Leeka Beats, Nasty C, Daliwonga, Yumbs	Confuse The Enemy

== Awards and nominations ==
=== Basadi in Music Awards ===
Year	Nominee / work	Award	Result	Ref.
2024	"Thula Mabota"	Amapiano Artist of the Year	Nominated	
2025	"Ngisakuthanda"	Amapiano Artist of the Year	Nominated	
2025	"Ngisakuthanda"	Sofnfree Artist of the Year	Won	
2025	"Ngisakuthanda"	Song of the Year	Nominated	
2025	"Ngisakuthanda"	Music Video of the Year	Nominated	
2026	Herself	Amapiano Artist of the Year	Nominated	
2026	Herself	Artist of the Year	Won	
2026	Herself	Best Styled Artist of the Year	Nominated	
2026	"Sesamukela"	Collaboration of the Year	Nominated	

=== Metro FM Music Awards ===
Year	Nominee / work	Award	Result	Ref.
2025	"FOMO"	Best Kwaito/Gqom	Nominated	

=== South African Dance Music Awards ===
Year	Nominee / work	Award	Result	Ref.
2024	Herself	Best Female Vocalist	Pending	

=== SAMA's ===
Year	Nominee / work	Award	Result	Ref.
2024	"Funk 55"	Motsepe Foundation Record of the Year	Won	
