= Moonchild Sanelly =

South African musician and dancer

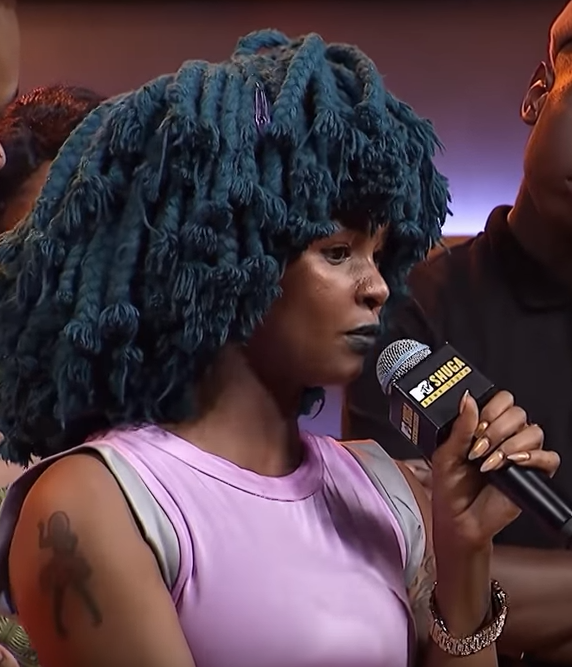
- Moonchild Sanelly on the preview of MTV Shuga Down South 2019

Background information
- Born: Sanelisiwe Twisha; 1987 (age 38–39); Port Elizabeth, South Africa
- Genres: Kwaito; hip hop; dancehall; funk; electronic; R&B; soul; amapiano
- Occupations: Singer; songwriter; dancer
- Instrument: Vocals
- Years active: 2006–present
- Label: Transgressive

Sanelisiwe Twisha (born 1987), known professionally as Moonchild Sanelly is a South African musician and dancer. She is known for her signature blue-coloured hair and her self-created music genre called "Future ghetto funk". Originally from Port Elizabeth, the singer first came into limelight in the Durban poetry and music scene before relocating to Johannesburg, where she has continued her musical career.

Her music has reached audiences beyond South Africa's borders, playing in festivals such as SXSW in Austin, Texas and Primavera Sound in Barcelona. In August 2018, she went on a European tour with South African hip hop group Die Antwoord.

== Early life and education ==
Moonchild Sanelly was born in Port Elizabeth, South Africa. She was born into a musical family, with her brother being a hip hop producer, her mother a jazz singer, and her cousins kwaito dancers.

She moved to Durban in 2005 to study fashion at the Linea Fashion Design Academy and stayed there for six years.

== Career ==
In 2006, Sanelly started performing in shows at the Durban University of Technology with a key focus in poetry and hip hop, although she did not actually call herself a poet for a long time until she noticed people's reactions. She featured regularly on a weekend show on Gagasi FM, called Poetry with King Siso. In mid 2020, she signed a record deal with Transgressive Records. In March 2015, she released her studio album Rabulapha! with Transgressive Records. Rabulapha! earned her a nomination at the 22nd Annual South African Music Awards for Best Alternative Album. Red Bull discovered her music through an EP she was featured on with DJ Shimza, which was eventually a part of the Soul Candi album. In 2019, Sanelly was featured on Beyoncé's The Lion King: The Gift album in the song "My Power" along with Busiswa and Nija. Towards the end of 2019, she dropped her 4 tracks mini album project titled Nude EP. She made a notable contribution on Our Culture, first track off Zingah's 2020 album.

In 2020, she was also featured on JazziDisciples album, 0303 in the song "Askies" and later in "With Love to an Ex", from Gorillaz' seventh studio album Song Machine, Season One: Strange Timez.

On 29 June 2021, her single "Yebo Teacher" was released. She was scheduled to host the TV show Madness Method on BET.

She made an announcement on Twitter of her feature on the FIFA 2022 soundtrack. On 1 October 2021, she announced her single "Demon" with Sadnightdynamite. The song was released on 4 October 2021, with accompanying music video.

In February 2022, Sanelly began her career in adult entertainment.

In late March 2022, she announced her second studio album Phases, which was scheduled to be released on June 10.

In May 2022, her single "Cute", featuring British rapper Trillary Banks, was released.

Her second studio album Phases was released on 10 June 2022.

Towards the end of October 2024, Moonchild announced her upcoming studio album Full Moon, that was released on 10 January 2025 by Transgressive Records. She also announced her upcoming UK and Ireland tour, scheduled to commerce on 5 March 2025 in Manchester.

== Artistry ==
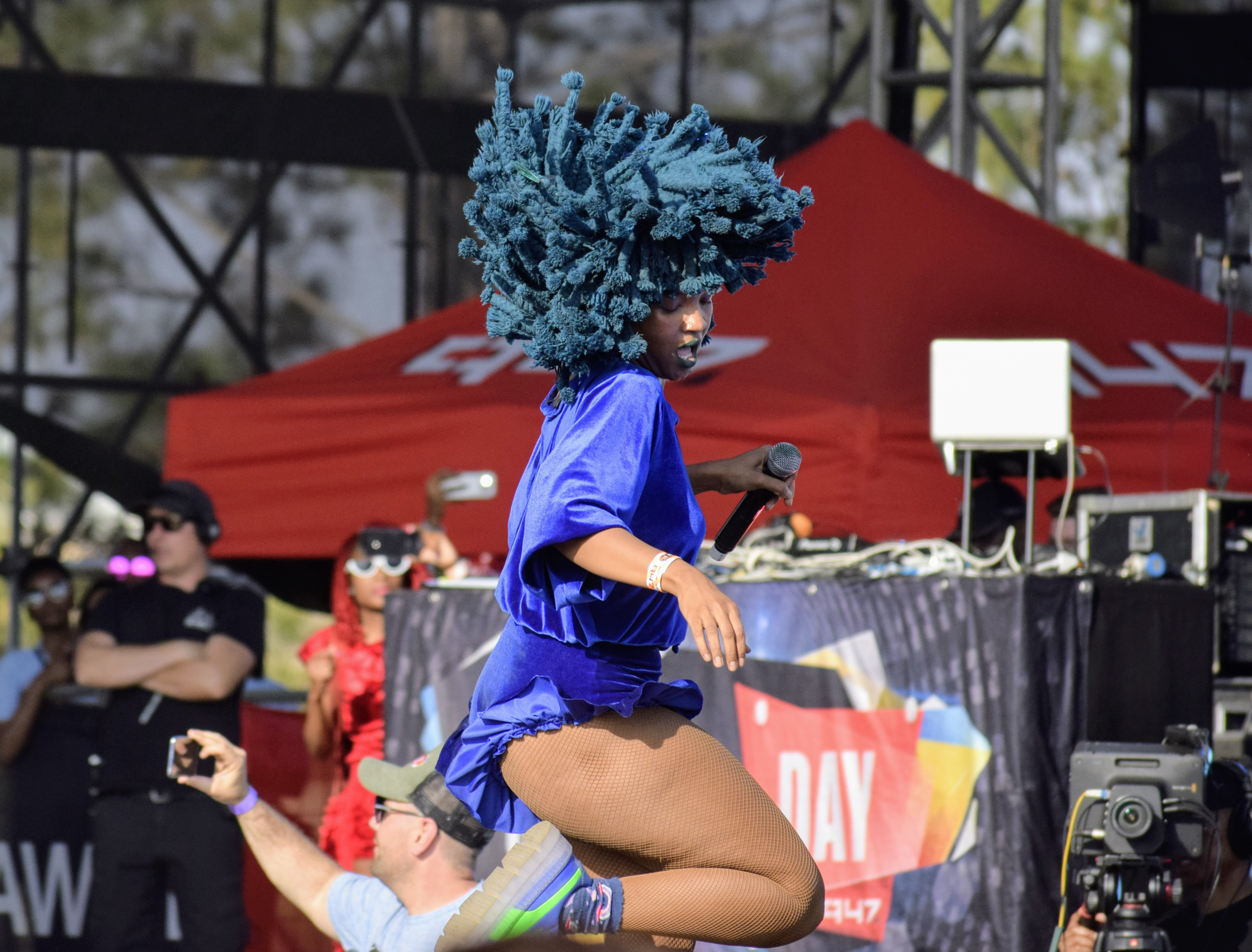
Moonchild Sanelly on stage in 2018.

Her music fuses elements of experimental electronic, afro-punk and edgy-pop with hints of her strong kwaito, hip hop and jazz background. Moonchild Sanelly is seen as a sex-positive figure and has never been scared to flaunt her body or speak about sex. She gives out sex advice on Valentine's Day through her social media accounts. In an interview with Basha Uhuru, she called herself "the president of female orgasm".

== Business ventures ==
Moonchild Sanelly has her on own clothing label called Moonchild Cultwear. She owns a Naked Club and has made it clear that it is not a brothel.

== Personal life ==
Sanelly is Xhosa and uses Xhosa language in most of her songs.

== Discography ==
Studio albums

- Rabulapha! (2015)
- Phases (2022)
- Full Moon (2025)
