= Reece Madlisa =

South African musician

- Also known as: Boy Boy
- Born: Clive Tshikosi; September 7, 1995 (age 30); Alexandra, Gauteng
- Origin: South Africa
- Genres: Amapiano
- Occupations: Singer; songwriter
- Instrument: Vocals
- Years active: 2018–present
- Labels: Virgin Music group
- Formerly of: AmaRoto

Clive Tshikosi (born September 7, 1995) professionally known as Reece Madlisa, is a South African singer and songwriter. He is best known for being a former member of the amapiano duo Amaroto. He rose to prominence subsequent to the release of Iy'ntsimbi Zase Envy which was certified multi-platinum in South Africa.

== Career ==
Tshikosi was introduced to the mainstream in 2020 when he put out his single Jazzidisciples (Zlele) with Zuma alongside Mr JazziQ and Busta 929 which led an extended play Amaroto. In 2022 he released "Megalo" with Zuma which was certified platinum.

Although the Duo Amaroto (made up of Reece Madlisa and his long-term friend Zuma) has split, they allegedly have been trying to put their differences aside to pursue their careers as a duo again. He later released his solo debut extended play Kwaito Nama Medi in 2023.

He is currently the brand ambassador of Lacoste South Africa.
