= Nontokozo Mkhize =

South African singer-songwriter

Nontokozo Hlengwa Mkhize is a South African singer-songwriter. Her musical career began in 2017 as a backup vocalist for various artist and became a solo artist in 2024. Her song "Esandleni" debuted number 1 on Spotify Charts and broke record for the most-streamed solo song by a female artist in a single week.

Her studio album Lindiwe (Deluxe), was released on October 17, 2025, debuted number 8 on Top Albums charts SA Top 10 for the first time ever.

== Discography ==
- Lindiwe (2025)

== Singles ==
=== As lead artist ===
List of singles as lead artist, with selected chart positions and certifications, showing year released and album name
Title	Year	Peak chart positions	Certifications	Album
Title	Year	ZA	Certifications	Album
"Lu Strong" (Nontokozo Mkhize featuring Nomfundo Moh)	2023	—		Non-album single
"Ungowam" (Mhaw Keyz, Nontokozo Mkhize)	2023	—		Non-album single
"Moyongcwele"	2024	—	RiSA: Platinum	Lindiwe
"Imisebenzi" (Nontokozo Mkhize featuring Aymos, Starr Healer)	2024	—		Non-album single
"Moyongcwele 2.0" (Nontokozo Mkhize featuring Xolly Mncwango, Dumi Mkokstad)	2024	—		Lindiwe
"Amathuna" (Nontokozo Mkhize, Nathi Mankayi)	2024	—		Non-album single
"AMEN" (Mhaw Keys, Nontokozo)	2024	—		Non-album single
"Incwadi" (Tee Ramzy, Soa Mattrix, Nontokozo Mkhize featuring Eemoh)	2024	—		Non-album single
"Okubi" (Piano City, Nontokozo Mkhize, featuring Major League DJz, Ranger, Royce77)	2025	—		Non-album single
"—" denotes a recording that did not chart or was not released in that territory.

== Achievements ==
=== Afrimma ===
Year	Nominee / work	Award	Result	Ref.
2025	Herself	Best Female Artist in African Inspirational Music	Nominated	
2025	Herself	Best Female Artist in Southern Africa	Won	

=== Basadi in Music Awards ===
Year	Nominee / work	Award	Result	Ref.
2024	Herself	Newcomer of the Year	Won	
2025	"Esandleni"	Song of the Year	Won	
2025	"Esandleni"	Sofn'Free Artist of the Year	Nominated	
2025	"Esandleni"	Gospel Artist of the Year	Won	

=== Metro FM Music Awards ===
Year	Nominee / work	Award	Result	Ref.
2024	Herself	Best Newcomer	Won	
2026	The Live Experience	Best Gospel Album	Pending	

=== South African Music Awards ===
Year	Nominee / work	Award	Result	Ref.
2025	Lindiwe	Best Contemporary Faith Music Album	Nominated	
2025	Herself	Newcomer of the Year	Won	
2026	"Esandleni"	SAMRO Highest Airplay Composer Award	Won	
