= Shebeshxt =

South African musician

Shebeshxt Shebe Marbuna
- Born: Lehlogonolo Katlego Chauke; Lebowakgomo, Limpopo, South Africa
- Occupation: Music artist
- Years active: 2021–present
- Criminal charges: Assault; attempted murder; malicious damage to property
- Musical career
- Also known as: Blingskat; MaBurner; Shebeshesa
- Genre: Lekompo
- Instrument: Vocals

Lehlogonolo Katlego Chauke is a South African rapper and controversial figure known under the alias of Shebeshxt.

== Early life ==
Shebeshxt was born and raised in Lebowakgomo, Limpopo.

== Career ==
In 2023, Shebeshxt signed a major deal with Italian prominent company Lamborghini wines by Lamborghini, shortly after he appeared on Podcast and Chill with MacG and made history by becoming the first guest to ever surpass 1 million views in two days with no record label, no television play nor radio play.

== Discography ==
- Topless Shxta's Journey Vol 1 (2022)
- Topless Shxta's Journey, Vol 2 (2023)
- My Music My Story (2024)

== Controversies ==
=== Legal issues ===
In April 2023, Shebeshxt was apprehended and faced jail time. On 9 May 2023, he appeared in Lebowakgomo Magistrate's court for two counts of assault (discharging a firearm after he allegedly fired four shots in the air at a family home in Ga-Mamaola village), attempted murder, and malicious damage to property. Shebeshxt's bail was denied after the National Prosecuting Authority spokesperson in Limpopo said that the case was postponed to gather further information. Shebeshxt remained in custody for four months until being released in August 2023. The discharge of firearm charges were withdrawn in October 2023.

On 13 November 2025, Shebeshxt appeared before the Polokwane Magistrate's Court and was remanded in custody following a shooting incident in Ladanna, Polokwane. He was charged with two counts of attempted murder after allegedly firing shots at another motorist's vehicle on 19 October 2025, injuring a 34-year-old man.

In a separate and ongoing case, Shebeshxt faced additional charges, including assault with intent to cause grievous bodily harm, robbery with aggravating circumstances, malicious damage to property, and two further counts of attempted murder. His next appearance in the Polokwane matter was scheduled for 21 November 2025, while the separate case was set for trial from 17 to 19 February 2026 in the Lebowakgomo Regional Court.
