= Capricorn FM =

Radio station in Limpopo, South Africa

- Limpopo; South Africa
- Frequencies: 96.0 MHz (Mokopane/Polokwane); 98.0 MHz (Hoedspruit); 105.4 MHz (Louis Trichardt); 97.6 MHz (Tzaneen)

Programming
- Format: Urban

History
- Founded: 2007
- First air date: 26 November 2007

Links
- Webcast: Windows Media Audio
- Website: capricornfm.co.za

Capricorn FM is a commercial radio station in the Limpopo province of South Africa.

== Overview ==
The Capricorn FM station broadcasts in the FM range and also streams on the internet. The station broadcasts on the following frequencies:

- 96.0 FM in Mokopane/Polokwane
- 98.0 FM in Hoedspruit
- 105.4 FM in Louis Trichardt
- 89.9 FM in Sibasa
- 97.6 FM in Tzaneen

Their broadcasting comprises 70% music and 30% talk shows. The music genres featured include R&B, soul, afro-pop, afro-soul, hip hop, kwaito, house, jazz, and gospel.

Its presenters include:

- Dee Nkomo
- Mpho Mashita
- Ms Kulie
- King Bash
- Muthusi Makosholo
- Black Moakamedi
- Dj Complexion
- Ngamula Teecee Chauke
- Vusi Alphaa
- Chris Chuene
- Tlou Tlolane
- Prudence Mabasa
- Aggrey Lichopwa
- Hellen Seabi
- Master Jay
- Wanani Rathanya
- Itumeleng Banda
- Mr Majo
- Lindiwe Manzini
- Mpho Magwabeni
- Hlekani Shikwambana
- Uncle TS

== History ==
The station is named after the latitudinal line that cuts across Limpopo, the Tropic of Capricorn. The station broadcasts from its studios in Bendor Park, Polokwane. It was established on November 26, 2007 and is led by its CEO, Simphiwe Mdlalose, who represents MSG Afrika Media. Mdlalose and his partner, former talk show host Given Mkhari, were part of a consortium that competed against several contenders for the license to broadcast in Limpopo. Past presenters have included Shandu Madima, Karabo Maila, Prudence Mabasa, Thabiso Kotane, Given Mabunda and Ashifa Shabba.

== Audience ==
Capricorn FM is a commercial radio station and broadcasts 70% in English and 30% in vernacular, incorporating the three dominant languages in the province (Tshivenda, Sepedi, and Xitsonga). Capricorn FM broadcasts 24/7 throughout Limpopo, with five transmitters covering the main towns and surrounding areas.

== Content ==
The station offers adult contemporary content, including news and opinions from on-air personalities. They also run competitions that are sponsored by brands like Tastic Rice and Samsung Mobile. Weather and sports news also fill in a substantial percentage of the content.

== Programming ==
=== Mondays - Thursdays ===
- 0000 - 0300 Soul Connection
- 0300 - 0600 The Morning Grind
- 0600 - 0900 On The Go Breakfast
- 0900 - 1200 The Tailored Experience
- 1200 - 1500 The Urban Lunch Experience
- 1500 - 1800 Just Drive
- 1800 - 2000 Progressive Talk
- 2000 - 0000 Capricorn FM Express

=== Fridays ===
- 0000 - 0300 Soul Connection
- 0300 - 0600 The Morning Grind
- 0600 - 0900 On The Go Breakfast
- 0900 - 1200 The Tailored Experience
- 1200 - 1500 Urban Lunch Experience
- 1500 - 1800 Just Drive
- 1800 - 1900 The Sport Precinct
- 1900 - 2200 The Friday Fiesta
- 2200 - 0000 Ea Baba Nights

=== Saturdays ===
- 0200 – 0600: The Rise
- 0600 – 1000: Saturday Breakfast
- 1000 – 1400: Urban Hot 40
- 1400 – 1800: The Saturday Plug
- 1800 – 2200: The Royal Movement
- 2200 – 0200: Ea Baba Nights

=== Sundays ===
- 0200 – 0600: The Rise
- 0600 – 1000: Sunday Restoration
- 1000 – 1400: Addictive Sundays
- 1400 – 1800: Body & Soul
- 1800 – 2100: The After Glow
- 2100 – 0000: The Last Gea
