= Jozi FM =

South African radio station

- Johannesburg; South Africa
- Broadcast area: Gauteng
- Frequency: 105.8 FM

Programming
- Languages: English, isiZulu, Sesotho, Sepedi, Setswana and Xitsonga
- Format: Local news, talk and music

Links
- Website: JoziFM.co.za

Jozi FM (formerly known as Soweto Buwa Radio) is a local radio station that started in 1995 as Soweto Community Radio. In 1999–2000, Soweto Community Radio and Buwa Radio merged to form Jozi FM, to form the largest community radio station in South Africa, broadcasting in several languages including: English, isiZulu, Sesotho, Sepedi, Setswana and Xitsonga. The station's radio format is 50 percent music and 50 percent discussion. The studios are based at Khaya Centre in Dube, Soweto, in South Africa, and the station covers regions all across Soweto, Kagiso, Lenasia, Krugersdorp, Randfontein, Kempton Park, Germiston and Alberton.

Jozi FM was first broadcast in 1999 and can claim a competitive audience of 564,000 (RAMS Nov 2009). Jozi FM is the first community radio station to be listed on the DSTV's audio bouquet.

Jozi FM attributes its success to the relationship it has with its audience. The radio station is a voice for the surrounding communities and focuses on delivering on the demands of its listeners. The subject matters range from education and information to fun and entertainment. Being a community radio station is not only a geographical aspect but also entails responsibility to the community in terms of advertising, sales and marketing to grow local businesses using radio as a medium.

== History ==
As a community radio station, Jozi FM was expected to fail from the onset. Some were skeptical about the lack and insufficiency of reliable equipment, and the station battled to secure a loyal listenership. The station was involved in multiple scandals which included fired deejays and a number of changes of station managers. Various deejays such as the late Fana Khaba, Penny Lebyane, Zanele Magoso-Luhabe and Mapaseka Makoti launched their careers at the station, not to mention Phindi Gule, Patrick Guma, Khanyi Mkhonza, Vusi Langa, Hlengiwe Mabaso, Nyakalo Leine, Christ Matshaba, Owatile Jacobs, Siphiwe Mtshali, Papa Moalusi and Khumbuzile Thabethe.

Roughly 80 percent of the deejays moved on to join bigger stations such as Kaya FM, Metro FM, Motsweding FM, Lesedi FM, SAFM and YFM and East Coast Radio. Among the few who remained include Dudu Gama, Andrew Tshaka and Rich Twala. The station continued to be the main DJ provider for multiple radio stations in Gauteng, Free State and North West.

Jozi FM was involved in a dispute regarding management and control of the radio station by various groups, which accounted for the skepticism surrounding the management and board. The issue of contracts became a recurring one, and programme managers were often accused of nepotism.

== Target audience ==
Although Jozi FM is a community radio station, it broadcasts nationwide, allowing for a more diversified audience range. The radio station targets a working-class, multi-cultural and educated audience.

== Line Up ==
MONDAY FRIDAY

•01H00-04H00 Angels of the Morning with Amos Mkongwana and MrMore Metse

•04H00-06H00 Breakfast Before Breakfast with Andile Thabethe

•06H00-09H00 Big Breakfast Show with Lungile Masondo and PelePele Mchunu

•09H00-12H00 Mid-Morning Chat with Penny Ntuli

•12H00-15H00 Ghetto Radio with QueenTee

•15H00-18H00 The Afternoon Fix with Refiloe Motsei and Vee Mthembu

MONDAY-WEDNESDAY

•20H00-22H00 SoWeTalk with Nontsikelelo Mthethwa

MONDAY-THURSDAY

•18H00-20H00 The Discussion with Collen Hans

• 22H00-01H00 The Late Night Affair with Fan Masango

THURSDAYS

•20H00-22H00 Injobo Enhle Ithungelwa Ebandla with Nontsikelelo Mthethwa

MONDAY

•18H00-19H00 Monday Blues with Collen Hans

•19H00-20H00 The Discussion with Collen Hans

FRIDAY

•18H00-19H00 The Deep and Soulful Therapy with Thabang ChillaNathi

•19H00-22H00 Local Top 20 with Amos Mkongwana

•22H00-02H00 Club Explosion with DJ Solly Vista and DJ Cya

SATURDAY

•02H00-05H00 Live@Dawn with Chami Moroke

•05H00-08H00 Weekend Breakfast with Phindile Kweyama

•08H00-11H00 Izigi Umgxobanyawo with Penny Ntuli and Masikane

•11H00-14H00 Trending Saturday with DJ Prince SA

•14H00-18H00 Solid Gold Reloaded with Andrew Tshaka

•18H00-21H00 Limpopo Connection with Amos Mkongwana, MrMore Metse, and DJ Robby D

•21H00-00H00 Club Explosion with DJ Solly Vista and DJ Cya

SUNDAY

•00H00-05H00 Automation

•05H00-06H00 Mafube Le Mmino wa Pelo with Matthews Moloi

•06H00-09H00 Unthombo Wokuphila with Matthews Moloi

•09H00-12H00 Listeners Requests

•12H00-15H00 The Sunday Lunch with Refiloe Motsei

•15H00-18H00 Matters of the Heart with Andrew Tshaka

•18H00-21H00 The Big Easy with Fan Masango

•21H00-22H00 My Gospel Hour

•22H00-01H00 The Rebound Show with Nontsikelelo Mthethwa

== Listenership figures ==
Estimated Listenership
	7 Day
Feb 2013	394 000
Dec 2012	297 000
Oct 2012	272 000
Aug 2012	367 000
Jun 2012	400 000
