= Joburg Theatre =

Theatre in Johannesburg, South Africa

- Joburg Theatre Complex; Johannesburg Civic Theatre
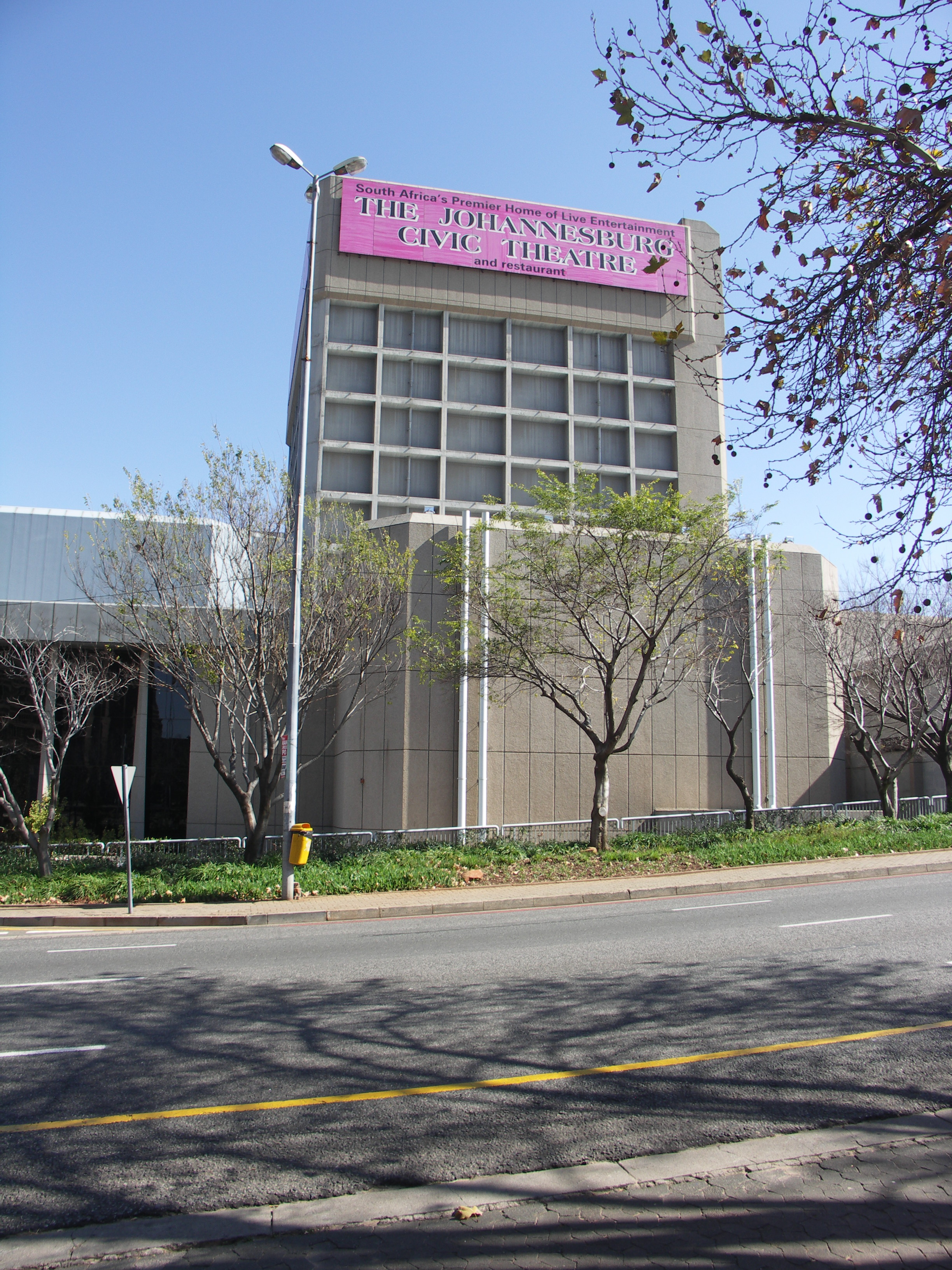
- Joburg Civic Theatre
- Interactive map of Joburg Theatre
- Address: 163 Civic Boulevard; Braamfontein, Johannesburg; South Africa
- Coordinates: 26.19°S 28.04°E
- Owner: City of Johannesburg; CEO Xoliswa Nduneni Ngema
- Capacity: 1,069

Construction
- Opened: 1962
- Rebuilt: 1987–1992
- Years active: 1962–present
- Architect: Manfred Hermer

Website
- http://www.joburgtheatre.com/

Joburg Theatre Complex, previously known as the Johannesburg Civic Theatre, is a group of four theatres situated in Braamfontein, Johannesburg, South Africa. It was built in 1962, refurnished in the late 1980s and reopened in the early 1990s before it was re-branded in 2009. It is a venue that stages both Broadway musicals and home-grown productions, and is one of the few theatres open in Johannesburg for independent productions.

== History ==
The idea for a theatre has its origins in 1959 to celebrate the 50th anniversary of the Union of South Africa called the Union Festival; an initial fund of R100,000 had been set aside by the Johannesburg City Council for an event and when the city was excluded from arranging a cultural event by the South African government, the idea of using the money for a civic theatre was introduced. Initially the idea was for a 750-seat theatre but this was soon scrapped in favour of an 1120-seat facility. Johannesburg City Council Mayor, Alec Gorshel, would break the ground at a ceremony at the construction site on 16 September 1960. Johannesburg Civic Theatre was completed in 1962, at a cost of R720,000 and was opened with a gala event on 27 August 1962, attended by the Mayor of Johannesburg and other civic dignitaries. The first production was Offenbach's Tales of Hoffmann with the next 31 weeks devoted to operas, ballet, dramas' light music and recitals with 145,000 guests attending in the first year and by the end of 1963, the figure had risen to 216,000. The theatre, owned by council, would be managed by the non-profit Johannesburg Civic Theatre Association which up until 1992 was made up of all white governors and management committee consisting of city council members and civic leaders. Johannesburg councillor Pieter M. Roos was its first chairman.

From its opening in 1962, the theatre was open to white people only due to the Reservation of Separate Amenities Act, 1953, which made mixed audiences at live theatre a criminal act. By April 1978, theatres could apply to open their seating to integrated audiences. The late 1970s saw the beginnings of an international cultural boycott of South Africa by international performers, playwrights and of new works, which affected what was available for production at the Civic Theatre and this boycott would continue until the early 1990s. A more local effect on the size of audiences attending the theatre was caused by the introduction of television in South Africa in January 1976.

A puppet theatre was established at the Civic Theatre in 1964. Children were entertained outside the complex, at the Rand Easter Show and by the use of a city bus that had been outfitted as a mobile theatre. The theatre was attended by international puppeteer companies. The puppet theatre was disbanded in 1987 and the puppets were donated to Rand Afrikaans University (RAU) now the University of Johannesburg.

In 1987, the Theatre was closed for two years of renovations costing R29 million; however, it would be five years before the theatre reopened, with renovations having cost R120 million. The backstage facilities and technical areas were overhauled, the main theatres height increased, and electrical work, lightning and cooling and heating improved. To reopen in September 1992, the theatre failed to secure an international act for its opening night. Les Misérables international producers cancelled and after much negotiation with the anti-apartheid groups in South Africa, the Dance Theatre of Harlem was the replacement production, co-produced by the Market Theatre.

In July 2000, the Johannesburg City Council corporatised the Johannesburg Civic Theatre Association as an independent municipal entity, the Johannesburg Civic Theatre (PTY) Ltd, and on 21 January 2009 the Civic Theatre was rebranded as the Joburg Theatre. On 1 January 2013, the Joburg Theatre, Soweto Theatre and Roodepoort City Theatre were integrated into a single theatre management company called Joburg City Theatres.

Michal Grobbelaar was the first managing director of the Johannesburg Civic Theatre, from 1960 until his retirement in 1993. Alan Joseph was appointed as executive director in 1993 and held the position until 1996. Janice Honeyman would take over as executive director from 1996, while prior to that she had been the artistic director since 1993. On 1 July 2000, Bernard Jay took over from Janice Honeyman as chief executive officer, with his contract extended a number of times until June 2013. From July 2013, experienced theatre administrator, Xoliswa Nduneni Ngema, was appointed as CEO.

== Theatres and facilities ==
Outside the main entrance to the theatre stands a statue called The Playmakers, crafted by Ernest Ullman, while at the south end of the theatre complex entrance are the terraced Theatre Gardens that are used by local office workers and students. In 2007, the gardens were transformed through a sponsorship and are now known as the Sappi Theatre Gardens. Costing R1.8 million, it has been upgraded and fenced with reed-shaped green fencing, paved walkways, trees, a circular podium, lightning and a water feature that trickles down from the theatre entrance, and has 24-hour surveillance. Also outside the theatre is a 'Walk of Fame' where over the years, famous performers handprints and names have been inscribed into the concrete pavement. The venue has a minimalistic two-level marbled foyer.

The theatre complex hosts six 5-star hospitality venues available for private hire. The Masekela and Broadway rooms each have a capacity of 20 patrons. The Sophiatown, The Brickhill, The West End and the Mandela Lounge can be used for lunches, dinners, cocktail parties, workshops, presentations, training sessions as well as board meetings. The theatre is served by a restaurant called Stages that is open all day until the end of the last performance.

The theatre has its own secure parking with uniformed guards. It is open from Tuesday to Friday between 6 pm and 3 am and at weekends and public holidays from 9 am to 3 am.

=== Mandela ===
The Nelson Mandela Theatre, previously known as the Main Theatre, can seat 1069 patrons and has a stage floor of 400m². It was renamed in 2001, and it is the only theatre in the world named after Nelson Mandela. The main stage has five computer controlled stage lifts that can raise the sets up to 3.9 metres above the stage and five stage wagons to move sets across the stage as well as a circular stage wagon.

=== The Lesedi Theatre ===
The Lesedi Theatre, previously known as the Fringe Theatre, can seat 251 patrons, with a stage floor of 72m². Michel Tesson was a French businessman who had interests in South Africa and he helped finance ballet productions in the country, as well as the establishment of bursaries for ballet dancers.

=== People's Theatre ===
The People's Theatre can seat 176 patrons, with a stage floor of 52m². The theatre caters predominantly for children's productions.

=== Space.com ===
This theatre can house 110 patrons and it is used for experimental works, play readings, rehearsals, classes, workshops as well speakers.

=== Dance Studios ===
There are two dance studios, located above one another, with glass facades, that allow the public to view rehearsals of the Joburg Ballet from Simmonds Street.

== See also ==
- List of Brutalist structures
