= Holland (surname) =

Holland is an English toponymic surname from Holland, a division of Lincolnshire, or any of the eight villages in various parts of England so called, from Old English 'hōh' (ridge) + 'land'. It is linked to the Holland family. Notable people with the name include:

== A–I ==
- Agnieszka Holland (born 1948), Polish film director
- Arnie Holland, American film distribution CEO of Lightyear Entertainment
- Bill Holland (born 1980), racing car driver, son of baseball player Will Holland
- Bjorn Holland (1841–1930), Wisconsin state legislator
- Bob Holland (1946–2017), Australian cricketer
- Brad Holland (born 1956), American basketball player and coach
- Brian Holland (born 1941), African-American songwriter and record producer
- Cecelia Holland (born 1943), American historical novelist
- Cedric Holland (1889–1950), Royal Navy officer
- Ceri Holland (born 1997), Welsh footballer
- Chester Holland (1888–1976), New Zealand cricketer
- Clifford Milburn Holland (1883–1924), designer of the Holland Tunnel
- Cyril Holland (1885–1915), son of Oscar Wilde, brother of Vyvyan Holland
- Dave Holland (disambiguation)
- Deidre Holland, Dutch porn star
- Derek Holland (activist), figure of the European far right
- Derek Holland (born 1986), American baseball player
- Dexter Holland (born 1965), singer and guitarist of the American punk band the Offspring
- Diane Holland (1930–2009), British actress
- Ed Holland (1918–2009), American editorial cartoonist
- Eddie Holland (born 1939), African-American songwriter and record producer, brother of Brian and part of Holland–Dozier–Holland
- Elmer J. Holland (1894–1968), 20th century U.S. Representative
- Fern Holland (1970–2004), American lawyer killed in the Iraqi conflict
- Ranae Holland, American biologist and Bigfoot researcher
- François Hollande (born 1954), President of France (2012–2017)
- George Holland (1791–1870), 19th century actor
- Greg Holland (born 1985), American baseball player
- Harry Holland (1868–1933), New Zealand politician and unionist
- Henry Holland (1745–1806), 18th-century Georgian architect
- Henry Holland (1859–1944), mayor of Christchurch, New Zealand
- Henry Holland, 1st Viscount Knutsford (1825–1914), the 19th- and 20th-century politician
- Ian Holland (born 1990), American cricketer
- Iris Holland (1920–2001), member of the Massachusetts House of Representatives

== J–L ==
- Jack Holland (boxer) (c.1909–1933), American boxer, college football player
- Jack Holland (footballer, born 1861) (1861–1898), English footballer
- Jack Holland (political scientist), British political scientist
- Jack Holland (politician) (1877–1955), Australian politician
- Jack Holland (rugby league), Australian rugby league footballer
- Jack Holland (writer) (1947–2004), Irish journalist, novelist and poetfDext
- James Holland (author) (born 1970), British author and popular historian
- James Holland (North Carolina politician), U.S. congressman from North Carolina – 18th/19th century
- James Holland (percussionist) (1933–2022), classical percussionist
- James Holland (soccer), Australian soccer player
- Jeff Holland, American football player
- Jeffrey Holland (actor)
- Jeffrey R. Holland (1940–2025), American religious leader
- Jennifer Holland, American actress
- Jerry Holland (musician), Canadian fiddler
- Jevon Holland (born 2000), Canadian-American football player
- Joe Holland (basketball), an American basketball player
- Joe Holland (skier), an American Nordic combined skier
- John C. Holland (1893–1970), councilman in the Los Angeles City Council, 1943–1966
- John Henry Holland, pioneer in genetic algorithms
- John Holland (athlete) (1926–1990), New Zealand athlete
- John Holland (baseball executive) (1910–1979), American general manager of the Chicago Cubs, 1956–1975
- John Holland (basketball) (born 1988), American professional basketball player
- John Holland (canoeist) (born 1952), American slalom canoer
- John Holland (cricketer) (1869–1917), English cricketer
- John Holland (engineer), Australian engineer and construction magnate
- John Holland (footballer) (born 1953), Maltese international footballer
- John Holland, 1st Duke of Exeter (c. 1352 – 1400), English nobleman
- John Holland, 2nd Duke of Exeter (1395–1447), English nobleman and military commander during the Hundred Years' War
- John L. Holland, developer of Holland Codes / Holland Occupational Themes RIASEC theory
- John Philip Holland, Irish submarine designer
- Johnny Holland (born 1965), American football player
- Jolie Holland, American singer and songwriter
- Jon Holland (born 1987), Australian cricketer
- Jonathan Holland (American football) (born 1985), American football wide receiver
- Jonathan Holland (footballer) (born 1978), footballer for Hamrun Spartans
- Jonathan Holland (rugby union) (born 1991), Irish rugby union player
- Jools Holland, British pianist
- Joseph R. Holland (born 1936), New York politician
- Julian Holland (boxer), Australian boxer of the 1990s and 2000s
- Kevin Holland, American Mixed Martial Artist
- Kimberly Holland, American Playboy playmate
- Lancelot Holland (1887–1941), Royal Navy officer
- Lionel Holland (1865–1936), British politician
- Luke Holland, drummer of the American metalcore band The Word Alive

== M–Z ==
- Margaret Holland, Duchess of Clarence (1385–1439), daughter of Thomas Holland, 2nd Earl of Kent
- Mark Holland, member of the Canadian parliament
- Mary E. Holland American detective and fingerprinting expert
- Mary Holland, American actress, comedian, writer
- Matt Holland (born 1974), Irish footballer
- Matthew Holland (disambiguation), various people
- Merlin Holland (born 1945), British writer and grandson of Oscar Wilde
- Milt Holland, American jazz percussionist, drummer, musicologist and session musician in Los Angeles
- Milton M. Holland (1844–1910), American Union army soldier
- Norah M. Holland (1876–1925), Canadian writer
- Owen Holland (academic), pioneer in bio-inspired robotics
- Patricia T. Holland (1942–2023), American LDS leader
- Patrick Holland (author), (born 1977) Australian writer
- Patrick Holland (ice hockey), Canadian ice hockey player
- Peter Holland (ice hockey), Canadian ice hockey player
- Philemon Holland, 16th/17th century English translator
- Richard Holland (disambiguation), various people, including

- Richard Holland, 15th-century Scottish writer
- Richard Holland (16th-century MP) (c. 1549–1618), Member of Parliament (MP) for Lancashire
- Richard Holland (Parliamentarian) (died 1661), English politician
- Richard J. Holland (1925– 2000), American politician in the Virginia Senate

- Rick Holland (born 1978), English poet and artist
- Rob Holland (pilot) (1974–2025), American aerobatic pilot
- Robert Holland, 1st Baron Holand (c. 1283–1328), English nobleman
- Roger Holland, Alaska politician
- R.F. Holland, British philosopher
- Samuel H. Holland, 20th-century American politician
- Sarah Holland-Batt (born 1982), Australian poet, critic, academic
- Savage Steve Holland, American animator
- Sidney Holland, Prime Minister of New Zealand
- Sir Henry Holland, 1st Baronet, the 19th-century physician and travel writer
- Sir John Holland, 1st Baronet (1603–1701), English politician
- Sir John Holland, 2nd Baronet (c. 1669–by July 1724), British politician
- Sonny Holland (1938–2022), American football coach and player
- Spessard Holland, Governor of Florida and U.S. senator
- Stephen Holland (swimmer), Australian Olympic swimmer
- Steve Holland (actor), American actor and model
- Stuart Holland, British Labour politician and academic
- Sylvia Holland, American animator
- Terry Holland, American college basketball coach and administrator
- Thomas Holland and Tom Holland (disambiguation), various people, including

- Thomas Henry Holland (1868–1947), British geologist
- Thomas Holland (Jesuit) (died 1642), Catholic priest, Jesuit and martyr
- Thomas Holland (translator) (1539–1612), English Bible translator
- Thomas Holland, 1st Duke of Surrey (1374–1400), aka 3rd Earl of Kent
- Thomas Holland, 1st Earl of Kent (c. 1314 – 1360), English nobleman and military commander during the Hundred Years' War
- Thomas Holland, 2nd Earl of Kent (1350–1397), English nobleman and a councillor of his half-brother Richard II (1374–1400)

- Victoria Holland, Cherokee politician and attorney
- Vyvyan Holland (1886–1967), British author, translator and son of Oscar Wilde
- W. S. Holland, American rock drummer
- Walter W. Holland (1929–2018), epidemiologist and public health physician
- Wau Holland (1951–2001), German computer hacker
- Willa Holland (born 1991), American model and actress
- William Holland (disambiguation), various people
  - William Holland (diarist) (1776–1819), English diarist
  - William Jacob Holland (1848–1932), zoologist, palaeontologist, and ordained Presbyterian minister

== See also ==
- Haaland, surname
- Hollander (includes Hollaender and Holländer)
