= John Holland =

John Holland may refer to:

== Academics ==
- John L. Holland (1919–2008), American psychologist and professor of sociology at Johns Hopkins University
- John Henry Holland (1929–2015), American scientist and professor of psychology and professor of electrical engineering and computer science at the University of Michigan

== Arts ==
- John Holland (poet) (1794–1872), English poet, newspaper editor, and writer on coal and metallurgy
- John Gill Holland (born 1964), American film producer
- John Holland (psychic) (born 1964), American author and psychic medium
- John Holland (actor, born 1899) (1899–1971), American film actor
- John Holland (actor, born 1908) (1908–1993), American film and television actor

== Athletics ==
- John Holland (American football) (born 1952), American football player
- John Holland (athlete) (1926–1990), New Zealand athlete
- John Holland (baseball executive) (1910–1979), American general manager of the Chicago Cubs, 1956–1975
- John Holland (basketball) (born 1988), American professional basketball player
- John Holland (canoeist) (born 1952), American slalom canoer
- John Holland (cricketer) (1869–1914), English cricketer
- Jack Holland (footballer, born 1861) (John Henry Holland, 1861–1898), English footballer who played for Notts County
- John Holland (footballer) (born 1953), Maltese international footballer
- Johnny Holland (born 1965), American football player
- Jon Holland (born 1987), Australian cricketer

== Business and engineering ==
- John Holland (banker) (died 1722), founder of the Bank of Scotland in 1695, the central bank of the Kingdom of Scotland
- Sir John Holland (engineer) (1914–2009), Australian engineer, founder of John Holland Group
- John Holland Group, Australian construction company
- John J. Holland (1843–1892), American shipbuilder
- John Holland (pen maker) (1838–1917), American businessman and industrialist

== Military ==
- John Vincent Holland (1889–1975), British Army officer, and recipient of the Victoria Cross
- John Philip Holland (1841–1914), designed submarines for the U.S. Navy and Royal Navy
- John Frederick Holland (c. 1764–1845), army officer, surveyor and political figure in Prince Edward Island
- John Charles Francis Holland (1897–1956), British Army officer

== Politics, law, and government ==
- Sir John Holland, 1st Baronet (1603–1701), English politician
- Sir John Holland, 2nd Baronet (c. 1669–by July 1724), British politician
- John Holland, on the Los Angeles County Civil Defense and Disaster Commission in 1960s
- John C. Holland (1893–1970), councilman in the Los Angeles City Council, 1943–1966
- John H. Holland (politician) (1857–1934), American politician from Arkansas
- John Robert Holland, American civil rights lawyer, volunteered to serve as a lawyer to four Guantanamo captives
- John W. Holland (1883–1969), American judge

== Religion ==
- John Christie Holland (1882–1954), Canadian pastor and the first Canadian of African heritage to be named a "Citizen of the Year"
- John Holland (bishop) (1912–1990), Anglican bishop in New Zealand

== Royalty ==
- John Holland, 1st Duke of Exeter (c. 1352–1400), half-brother to Richard II of England and second husband of Elizabeth Plantagenet, daughter of John of Gaunt
- John Holland, 2nd Duke of Exeter (1395–1447), his son

== See also ==
- Jack Holland (disambiguation)
- Jonathan Holland (disambiguation)
