= Samuel Holland =

Samuel or Sam Holland may refer to:

- Samuel H. Holland, state senator in Arkansas
- Samuel Holland (politician) (1803–1892), Welsh Liberal party politician
- Samuel Holland (surveyor) (1728–1801), Dutch-born Surveyor General of British North America
- Sam Holland (baseball) (born 1994), Australian baseball player
- Sam Holland (sculptor), British sculptor

== See also ==
- Holland (surname)
