= Jack Holland =

Jack Holland may refer to:

- Jack Holland (boxer) (c. 1909 – 1933), American boxer, college football player
- Jack Holland (politician) (1877–1955), Australian politician
- Jack Holland (rugby league) (1922–1994), Australian professional rugby league footballer
- Jack Holland (footballer, born 1861) (1861–1898), English footballer
- Jack Holland (footballer, born 1897) (1897–1944), English footballer
- Jack Holland (writer) (1947–2004), Irish journalist, novelist and poet
- Jack Holland (political scientist), British academic

== See also ==
- John Holland (disambiguation)
