= Henry Thacker =

New Zealand doctor and politician

The Honourable Henry Thacker
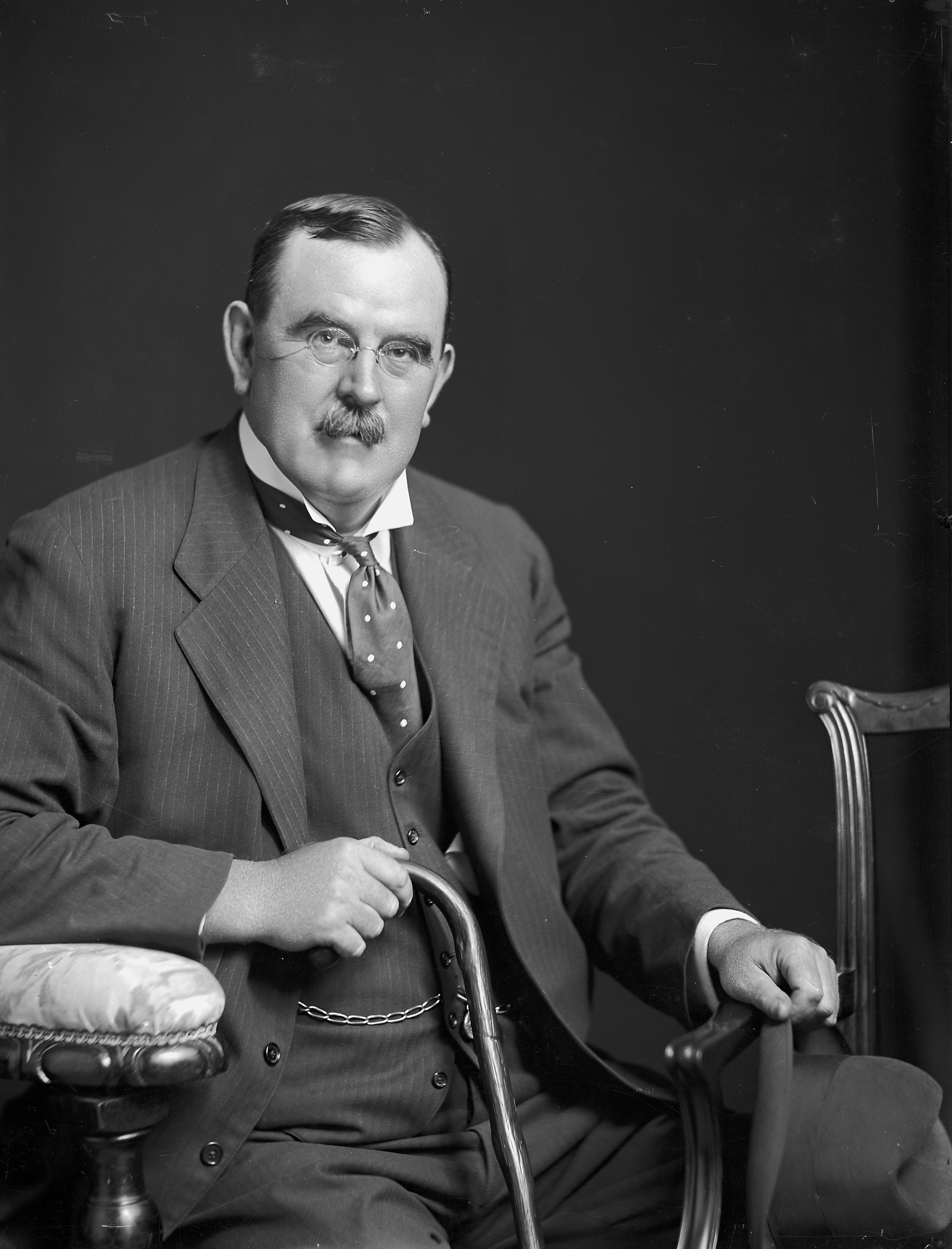
- Henry Thacker in 1918

Member of the New Zealand Parliament for Christchurch East
- In office 10 December 1914 – 7 December 1922
- Preceded by: Thomas Davey
- Succeeded by: Tim Armstrong

32nd Mayor of Christchurch
- In office 1919–1923
- Preceded by: Henry Holland
- Succeeded by: James Arthur Flesher

Personal details
- Born: 20 March 1870 Okains Bay, New Zealand
- Died: 3 May 1939 (aged 69)
- Party: New Zealand Liberal Party
- Education: Canterbury College; University of Edinburgh
- Occupation: doctor

Henry Thomas Joynt Thacker (20 March 1870 – 3 May 1939) was a medical doctor, New Zealand Member of Parliament and Mayor of Christchurch.

== Early life ==
Thacker was born in Okains Bay on Banks Peninsula on 20 March 1870. His parents were Essy Joynt and John Edward Thacker. His father was an editor of the Sligo Guardian and after emigration to Christchurch in 1850, launched the second newspaper in Canterbury, the Guardian and Canterbury Advertiser. The newspaper failed after only a few months.

Henry Thacker attended Boys' High School and then Canterbury College (what is now known as the University of Canterbury), from where he graduated with a Bachelor of Arts. He then enrolled at University of Edinburgh where he gained his M.B. and C.M. diplomas in 1895. Two years later he gained a fellowship in the Royal College of Surgeons in Dublin.

== Return to New Zealand ==
Thacker returned to Christchurch in 1898 and opened a practice in Latimer Square. He represented Canterbury in rugby union in 1889 and 1891 and assisted in the development of Richard Arnst. From 1899 he held the rank of captain in the Army Medical Corps.

== Rugby league ==
Thacker was the first president of the Canterbury Rugby Football League when the organisation began holding competitions in 1913. He served in this position from 1912 until 1929 and became a life member in 1920. Thacker also donated the Thacker Shield in 1913. He was the manager of the New Zealand side during their tour of Australia in 1913.

== Political career ==
Thacker was a member of the Christchurch Hospital Board (1907–1922), Lyttelton Harbour Board (1907–1922), Christchurch City Council (1929–1931) and Mayor of Christchurch between 1919 and 1923. The 1919 mayoral election was contested by Thacker, John Joseph Dougall (Mayor of Christchurch 1911–1912) and James McCombs (MP for Lyttelton).

New Zealand Parliament
Years	Term	Electorate	Party
1914–1919	19th	Christchurch East	Liberal
1919–1922	20th	Christchurch East	Liberal

Thacker contested the 1908 and 1911 general elections without success in the Lyttelton and Christchurch East electorates, respectively. He then contested the Lyttelton by-election in 1913 as an independent Liberal, coming fourth with 5% of the vote in the first ballot.

Thacker was a member of the Liberal Party and represented the Christchurch East electorate in the New Zealand House of Representatives from 1914. He was re-elected in 1919 but was defeated in 1922 by Tim Armstrong from the Labour Party, when he came second out of three candidates.

In 1935, he was awarded the King George V Silver Jubilee Medal.

== Death ==
Thacker died on 3 May 1939 at Christchurch. His wife died in 1955, and they are both buried at Waimairi Cemetery. The Thackers had no children.

New Zealand Parliament
Preceded by Thomas Davey	Member of Parliament for Christchurch East; 1914–1922	Succeeded by Tim Armstrong
Political offices
Preceded by Henry Holland	Mayor of Christchurch; 1919–1923	Succeeded by James Flesher
