= Robert Holland =

Robert, Bob, or Rob Holland may refer to:

- Robert Holland, 1st Baron Holand (c. 1283–1328), English nobleman
- Robert W. Holland (died 1866), American politician and judge
- Dutch Holland (1903–1967), Major League Baseball outfielder
- Robert C. Holland (1925–2013), American economist
- Robert Holland (executive) (1940–2021), American businessman, CEO of Ben & Jerry's
- Bob Holland (1946–2017), Australian cricketer
- Bob Holland (runner) (born 1938), American middle-distance runner, 1960 NCAA runner-up for the UCLA Bruins track and field team
- Robert Holland (ice hockey) (born 1957), Canadian ice hockey goaltender
- Rob Holland (pilot) (1974–2025), American aerobatics pilot
- Sir Robert Holland (colonial administrator) (1873–1965), administrator in British India

== See also ==
- R. Holland Duell (1824–1891), American lawyer and politician
- John Robert Holland, American lawyer
