= Astrid S. Tuminez =

American educator and college president

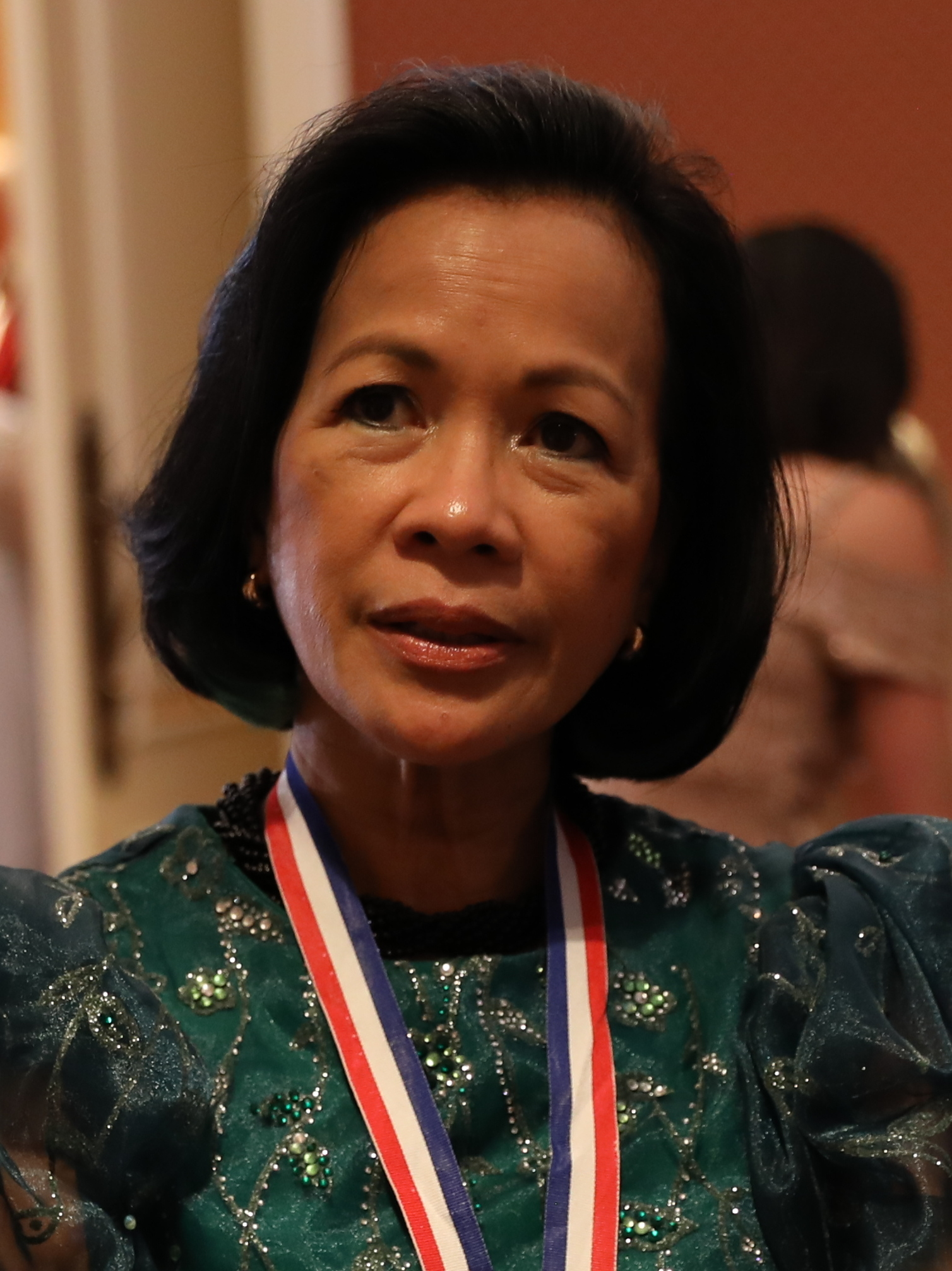
- Tuminez in 2024

7th President of Utah Valley University
- In office June 2018 – May 2026
- Preceded by: Matthew S. Holland
- Succeeded by: Wayne Vaught (interim)

Personal details
- Born: 8 August 1964 (age 62) Iloilo, Philippines
- Spouse: Jeffery S. Tolk (m. 1988; died 2025)
- Children: 3
- Education: Brigham Young University (BS); Harvard University (MA); Massachusetts Institute of Technology (PhD)
- Website: uvu.edu/president

Mary Astrid Segovia Tuminez (born 8 August 1964) is an educational administrator who was the seventh president of Utah Valley University in Orem, Utah, and its first female president. In January 2026, Tuminez announced plans to resign from her position at the end of the semester.

== Early life and education ==
Astrid Tuminez was born in a small island village in Iloilo province, the Philippines. Raised in extreme poverty and the sixth of seven children, she received a scholarship at the age of five to attend a private school run by Catholic nuns, along with her older siblings. Tuminez credits this pivotal moment in her life for her success and accomplishments and has said she feels strongly that education enables individuals to fulfill their dreams and maximize their potential:

Tuminez came to the United States at age 18 in 1982 on a student visa to study at Brigham Young University (BYU). She earned a bachelor's degree in Russian and international relations from BYU, a master's degree in Soviet Studies from Harvard University, and a Ph.D. in political science and government from the Massachusetts Institute of Technology.

== Career ==
Tuminez was a program officer at the Carnegie Corporation of New York, focused on grant making for democratization, conflict prevention, and non-proliferation of weapons of mass destruction. She joined AIG Global Investments as a research director and ran the Moscow office of the Harvard Project on Strengthening Democratic Institutions where she worked with leading reformers of communism.

Tuminez was a senior research consultant to the U.S. Institute of Peace and assisted in peace negotiations between the Moro Islamic Liberation Front and the Philippine government from 2003 to 2007. She is member and former adjunct fellow of the Council on Foreign Relations.

She served as Vice-Dean of Research and Assistant Dean of Executive Education of the Lee Kuan Yew School of Public Policy (National University of Singapore)

Tuminez was Microsoft's regional director for corporate, external and legal affairs for Southeast Asia, leading a team supporting 15 markets. Her role was to strengthen government relations, cultivate corporate citizenship, and enhance understanding of trending issues shaping regulation and policy, specifically drivers of inclusive growth in the 4th Industrial Revolution.

In 2013, Tuminez was named a Top 100 Global Influencer by the Filipina Women's Network of the United States. Tuminez was a director of the Philippines' second largest bank, the Bank of the Philippine Islands, and board member of Singapore American School and ASKI Global, an NGO which trains and finances entrepreneurship among Asian women migrant laborers. She was ASKI's Chair of the Board until 2017.

In 2018, Tuminez was appointed president of Utah Valley University, succeeding Matthew S. Holland, son of Jeffrey R. Holland, a member of the LDS Church's Quorum of the Twelve Apostles. At the time, Tuminez lived in Singapore.

During her tenure as university president, Charlie Kirk was killed while speaking on campus. In the aftermath of the event, Tuminez introduced the program "Better Selves for a Better America", which includes "academic certifications in dialogue, negotiation, mediation."

In a university address on January 14, 2026, Tuminez announced plans to resign from her position on May 1, 2026 "to devote more time to her family and personal pursuits."

== Personal ==
Tuminez is fluent in English, Russian, Hiligaynon (Ilonggo), French, Tagalog and Spanish. She is a member of The Church of Jesus Christ of Latter-day Saints (LDS), having joined at age 11 with her family.

Tuminez married Jeffrey Tolk in 1988. They met while both students at Harvard University. He was a lawyer and later worked in finance. They had three children together. Tolk died in February 2025.

Tuminez enjoys running and has completed one marathon and four half-marathons. She had 11 years of martial arts training in a system called Tan's Dazzling Hands while living in New York City. She is a 'super fan' of the UVU wrestling team.

== Selected publications ==
- Rising to the Top? A Report on Women's Leadership in Asia, A Report from the Lee Kuan Yew School of Public Policy and Asia Society, launched at the April 2012 Women Leaders of New Asia Summit, Shanghai and Zhenjiang, 18–20 April 2012.
- Russian Nationalism Since 1856. Ideology and the Making of Foreign Policy (Lanham, MD: Rowman and Littlefield, Inc., 2000).
- Asia and the Global Economic Crisis, A Task Force Report, Lee Kuan Yew School of Public Policy, National University of Singapore, 12 March 2009 [written with other Task Force members].
- Russia in Southeast Asia: A New "Asian Moment?" (with Hong, Mark), in ASEANRUSSIA Foundation and Future Prospects, Victor Sumsky, Mark Hong and Amy Lugg, eds. (Singapore: ISEAS Publishing, 2012), pp. 43–55.
- Reframing Conceptual Approaches to Interpret Sex Worker Health (with Joseph D. Tucker), Journal of Infectious Diseases 2011:204 (SUPPL 5) S1206-S1210.
- The Problem That Has Been Named Global-is-Asian (Lee Kuan Yew School of Public Policy), No. 11, July–September 2011, pp. 34–37.
