= Matthew Holland (disambiguation) =

Matt Holland (born 1974) is a former footballer.

Matthew Holland may also refer to:

- Matthew S. Holland (born 1966), President of Utah Valley University
- Matthew Holland (cricketer) (born 1971), former English cricketer
- Matt Holland (football manager) (born 1988), Welsh football manager
- Matthew Holland (water polo) (born 1989), water polo player
