= Jonathan Holland =

Jonathan Holland may refer to:

- Jonathan Holland (footballer) (born 1978), footballer for Hamrun Spartans
- Jonathan Holland (American football) (born 1985), American football wide receiver
- Jonathan Holland (rugby union) (born 1991), Irish rugby union player
- Jon Holland (born 1987), Australian cricketer

== See also ==
- John Holland (disambiguation)
