= Dave Holland =

Dave Holland or David Holland may refer to:

- Dave Holland (bassist) (born 1946), British jazz bassist and composer
- Dave Holland (drummer) (1948–2018), British rock drummer
- Dave Holland (Klansman), American white supremacist
- Dave Holland (rugby) (1887–1945), rugby union and rugby league footballer of the 1910s, and 1920s
- David Holland (judge), Irish judge
- David F. Holland (born 1973), American historian
- David Holland (Medal of Honor), Medal of Honor recipient for his duties in the American Indian Wars
