= Thomas Holland =

Thomas Holland may refer to:

- Thomas Holland, 1st Earl of Kent (c. 1314–1360), English nobleman and military commander
- Thomas Holland, 2nd Earl of Kent (1350–1397), English nobleman and councillor to Richard II
- Thomas Holland, 1st Duke of Surrey (1374–1400), also 3rd Earl of Kent
- Thomas Holland (translator) (1549–1612), English Calvinist scholar and theologian
- Thomas Holland (Jesuit) (1600–1642), Catholic priest, Jesuit and martyr
- Thomas Holland (bishop) (1908–1999), Catholic bishop of Salford
- Thomas Holland (1633–1690), namesake of Holland Brook, New Jersey
- Thomas Holland (MP) (died 1618), English merchant and politician who sat in the House of Commons at various times between 1593 and 1614
- Thomas Holland (MP for Anglesey) (1577–1643), of Berw, MP for Anglesey, 1601
- Thomas Erskine Holland (1835–1926), British jurist
- Thomas Henry Holland (1868–1947), British geologist
- Thomas Lee Holland (filmmaker) (born 1943), American film director
- Thomas Stanley Holland (born 1996), British actor

== See also ==
- Holland (surname)
- Tom Holland (disambiguation)
- Thomas Holland House
