= Kate Sheppard House =

Historic home of a leader in NZ's women's suffrage campaign, Christchurch, NZ

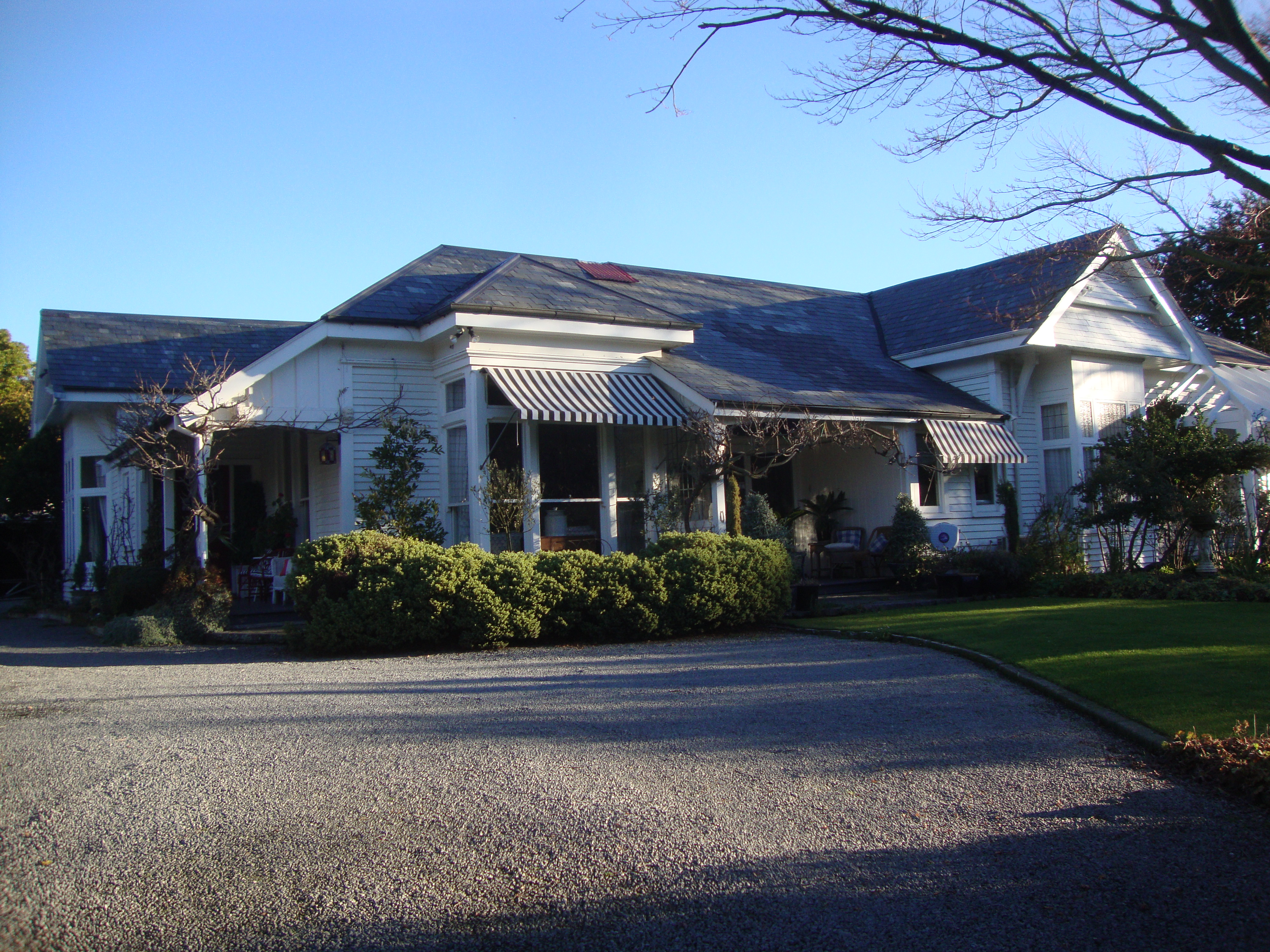
- Kate Sheppard House in 2012
- Interactive map of the Kate Sheppard House area

General information
- Type: Residential home
- Location: Ilam, 83 Clyde Road, Christchurch, New Zealand
- Coordinates: 43.523637°S 172.588132°E
- Owner: Heritage New Zealand

Height
- Roof: slate

Technical details
- Structural system: timber
- Floor count: one

Website
- visitheritage.co.nz/visit/upper-south-island/te-whare-waiutuutu-kate-sheppard-house

Heritage New Zealand – Category 1
- Designated: 10 December 2010
- Reference no.: 9325

Kate Sheppard House is a historic building and museum on Clyde Road in the Christchurch suburb of Ilam, bordering the University of Canterbury. It was the home of Kate Sheppard from 1888 to 1902, the key years where she led the campaign for women's suffrage. It was later the family home of the 30th Mayor of Christchurch, John Joseph Dougall.

The villa is registered as a Category I heritage place by the New Zealand Historic Places Trust, due to Sheppard's crucial work and activities in the house that led to the enfranchisement of New Zealand women. The New Zealand Government purchased the property in 2019. The building was opened as a museum in 2020 to educate the public and preserve the history of Sheppard and the New Zealand women's suffrage movement.

== History ==
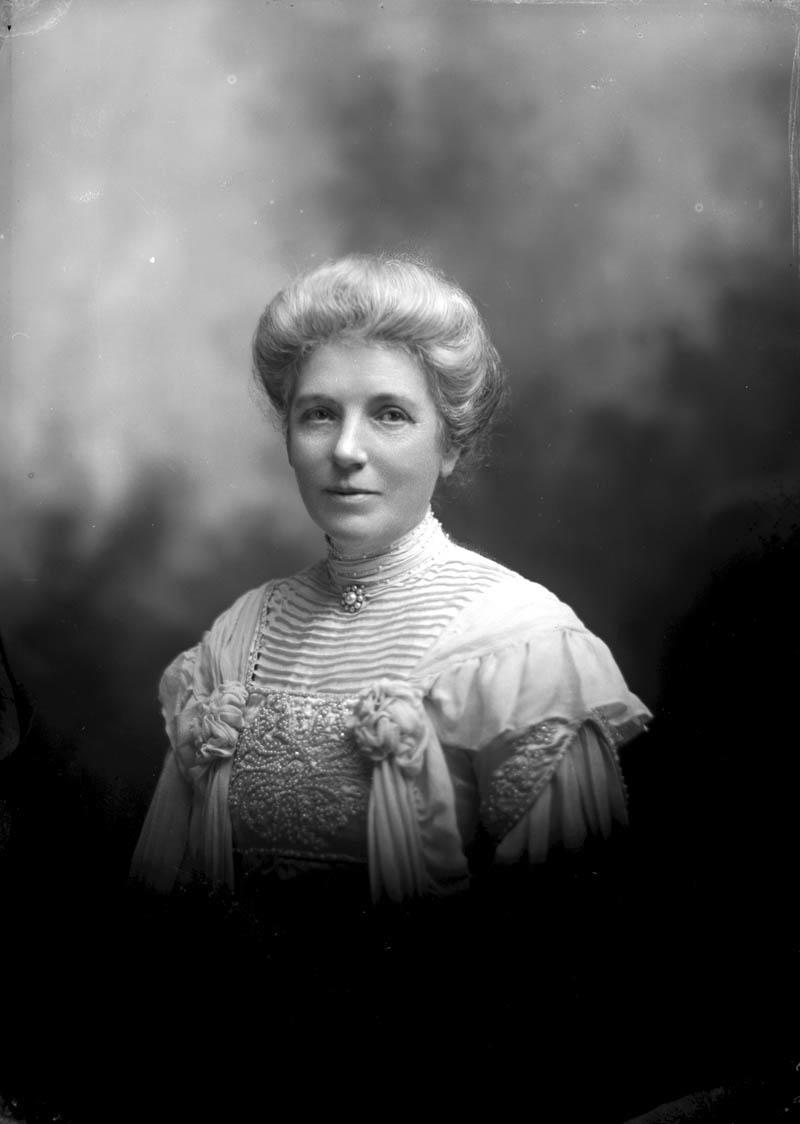
Kate Sheppard's most active period was when she lived in this house

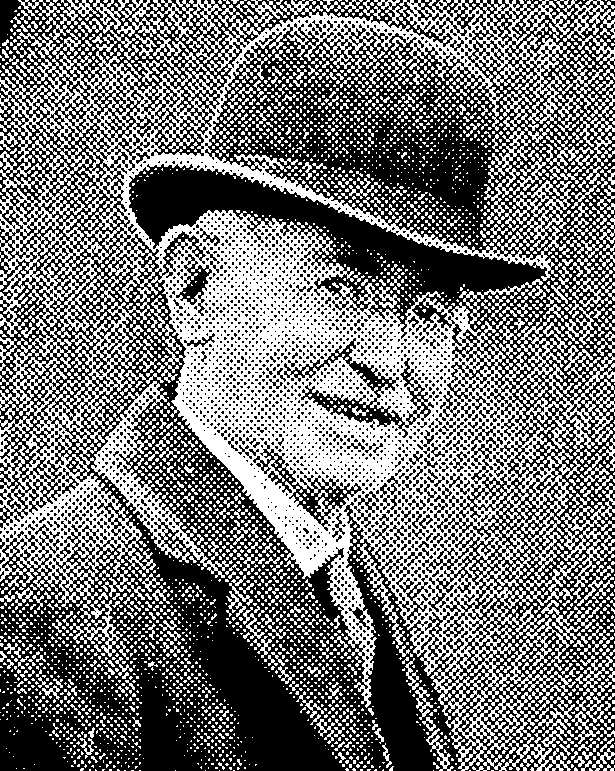
John Joseph Dougall was the second owner

The land was purchased for £400 in November 1887 by Walter Sheppard, Kate Sheppard's husband. The land, 2 acres (0.81 ha) in size, had previously been part of the Deans estate. It was neighbouring the house of Sheppard's younger sister Isabella, whose husband had bought their land in 1884, and not far from her elder sister Marie's house, who lived on Riccarton Road. Some 3 miles (4.8 km) from the city centre, at the time, the area was rural. The Sheppards moved into their villa in 1888.

After Kate Sheppard became the leader of the women's suffrage campaign, her home was used as a base for meetings and other work related to the movement. Notably, it was in the house that Sheppard pasted together the petitions seeking the enfranchisement of women onto sheets of wallpaper. This included the 'monster petition' of 1893, with over 25,000 signatures it was 270 metres long. Sheppard also utilised her home to prepare speeches, letters, and articles for publication in the campaign for women's suffrage. Important and influential people were frequent visitors to the house, including feminist Ada Wells, and MPs John Hall and Alfred Saunders.

Walter Sheppard went into retirement in 1902 and decided to return to England. The house sold on 3 April 1902 to John Joseph Dougall, a prominent barrister and solicitor. Dougall's family consisted of a wife and four children. Upon his death on 5 September 1934, the house passed to his son Leslie, who also worked in the legal profession.

Leslie Dougall sold the house in 1939 to Helen Nicoll, the wife of the merchant Henry Nicoll. In 1944, the land was subdivided and the property reduced to its current size. Subsequent owners were Reginald Warren (July 1947 – 1954), William George Weigel (1954 – January 1956), and Dr Anthony Allison (January 1956 – December 1985), who lived in the house and operated a medical surgery from it. Andrew Everist and his wife Julia became owners in December 1985. After separating, Julia Burbury lived there by herself.

When Andrew and Julia Everist bought the property in 1985 the historical significance was not known to them. They only found out about it in 1993 when the centenary of women's suffrage caused increased interest in Sheppard. Burbury put the house on the market just prior to the 125th anniversary of women's suffrage and on 18 September 2018, Jacinda Ardern announced that the Government is interested in buying the house to preserve its history. On 19 September 2019, it was announced that the house has been purchased by the New Zealand Government, and will be managed by Heritage New Zealand.

Since 2020 Kate Sheppard House has been open to the public. The museum offers guided tours and morning and afternoon tea, alongside art and interpretative exhibitions. In 2021, it won the Heritage New Zealand Outstanding Contribution to Heritage Award.

=== Heritage registration ===
The building was registered as a heritage building by the New Zealand Historic Places Trust on 10 December 2010 with registration number 3659 classified as Category I listing. It was registered for its outstanding historical significance in relation to Sheppard, as much of the women's suffrage campaign was orchestrated from the house.

== See also ==
- List of oldest buildings in Christchurch
- List of historic places in Christchurch
