= William Holland =

William, Will, Bill, or Billy Holland may refer to:

== Politicians ==
- William Holland (merchant), English merchant and MP for Dartmouth
- William Holland (politician) (1782–?), Irish-born farmer and politician in Nova Scotia
- William H. Holland (politician) (1841–1907), member of the Fifteenth Texas Legislature
- William Holland, 1st Baron Rotherham (1849–1927), British industrialist and politician

== Sportsmen ==
=== Baseball ===
- Will Holland (baseball, born 1862) (1862–1930)
- Will Holland (baseball, born 1998)
- Billy Holland (baseball) (1874–?), pitcher, Negro league career 1894–1908
- Bill Holland (right-handed pitcher) (Elvis William Holland, 1901–1973), pitcher, Negro leagues career 1920–1941
- Bill Holland (left-handed pitcher) (William David Holland, 1915–1997), pitcher, Major League career 1939

=== Other sports ===
- Bill Holland (sprinter) (1874–1930), track and field athlete
- Bill Holland (1907–1984), American racing driver
- Bill Holland (basketball) (1914–2000), American professional basketball player
- Billy Holland (born 1985), Irish rugby union player

== Others ==
- William Holland (diarist) (1746–1819), English diarist
- William Holland (publisher) (1757–1834), British radical, author and publisher
- William Holland (stained glass maker) (1809–1883), British maker of stained glass
- William Jacob Holland (1848–1932), zoologist and paleontologist
- William L. Holland (1907–2008), Institute of Pacific Relations
- William "Will" Holland (born 1980), English musician known as Quantic
- Will Holland, member of the country band The Lonely Hearts

== See also ==
- Holland (surname)
