= John Joseph Dougall =

New Zealand politician

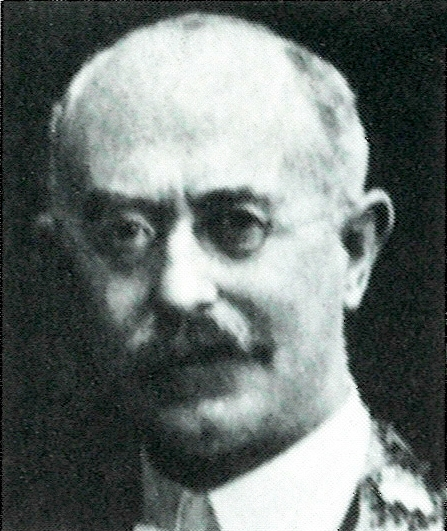
- Portrait of John Joseph Dougall

30th Mayor of Christchurch
- In office 31 July 1911 – 1 May 1912
- Preceded by: Tommy Taylor
- Succeeded by: Henry Holland

Personal details
- Born: 1860 Aberdeenshire
- Died: 5 September 1934 (aged 73–74)
- Profession: solicitor

John Joseph Dougall (1860 – 5 September 1934) was Mayor of Christchurch in 1911–1912. He was a solicitor by profession. In his later life, the Navy League was his main interest.

== Early life ==
Dougall was born in Aberdeenshire in Scotland in 1860. He attended Greyfriars Parish School in Aberdeen. Mary Dougall (a dressmaker aged 35 or 25) came to New Zealand with John Dougall and his younger brother Alexander in 1871 on board the ship Merope. The ship left Gravesend on the River Thames on 9 June and arrived in Lyttelton on 25 August.

Dougall attended Mr Gee's School in Worcester Street, Christchurch Central City.

== Professional life ==
Dougall started his training with Garrick, Cowlishaw and Co in 1876 or earlier. He was admitted as solicitor to the Supreme Court in 1896. Dougall and John Hazlitt Upham (the father of Charles Upham) had an office in 148 Worcester Street and acted as commissioners for the Australian States and South African colonies. In later life, he was one of the directors of Regent Street Limited, the company that developed Christchurch's New Regent Street.

== Political career ==
Dougall stood as council candidate in the Linwood Borough for the election on 10 September 1896, but he came fifth, and as there only three positions available, he was not successful. He was a member of the Riccarton Road Board (1901–1910). He joined the Christchurch Tramway Board in its first year of existence when the Riccarton – Sockburn sub-district was added.

He successfully stood for Christchurch City Council in the Central Ward in the April 1909 election, coming fifth out of ten candidates vying for six available positions. Henry Holland, a later mayor, came eight in this election and was thus unsuccessful. At the next election in April 1911, he was returned at the head of the poll in the Central Ward (with Henry Holland in second place).

Tommy Taylor, the new mayor elected at the April 2011 election, died after only three months in office. Dougall initially deputised as mayor after Taylor's death and at the next council meeting on 31 July 1911, he was unanimously elected the next mayor by his fellow city councillors. Many of them lamented the antiquated legislation which did not allow for an election at large in case of the death of the incumbent mayor. Since the December 1876 election when James Gapes was returned, mayors had been elected at large. Dougall was succeeded as a city councillor by Henry Acland.

During his term as mayor, the foundation stone for the Government Building (a Category 1 heritage building) in Cathedral Square was formally laid by Prime Minister Sir Joseph Ward in the presence of many members of parliament. Dougall presided over the ceremony. Wordsworth Street was extended to Colombo Street and then used by the rerouted Opawa tram route as a considerable improvement. Steps were taken for the city council to purchase the Canterbury Provincial Council Buildings from the Government.

The next mayoral election was held on 24 April 1912, and it was contested by Dougall, Henry Holland, and Henry Thacker. Like the previous election in April 1911, the incumbent came last. Holland was successful with 4,127 votes, with Thacker and Dougall receiving 2,931 and 2,637 votes, respectively. Holland was installed as mayor on 1 May 1912.

== Community involvement ==
=== Military membership ===
Captain Dougall was a volunteer with the Canterbury Militia and Volunteer District from 1878 to 1895. He had the rank of lieutenant when he retired. In his later life, the Navy League was his main interest, and he was president of the Christchurch branch for the last 12 years of his life. At one time, he was chairman of the New Zealand branch of the Navy League.

=== Other roles ===
Dougall was a director of the Canterbury Caledonian Society. As a Freemason, he had the title of Right Worshipful District Grand Master (1914–1915) of the Scottish Constitution. At the 1915 annual meeting in the Wellington Town Hall, he was re-elected for another year and gave a long-remembered speech that was the impetus for the masonic war benevolent fund.

He served on the Lyttelton Harbour Board for six years. He was a member of the board of governors of Canterbury College from 1916 until his death.

== Family and death ==
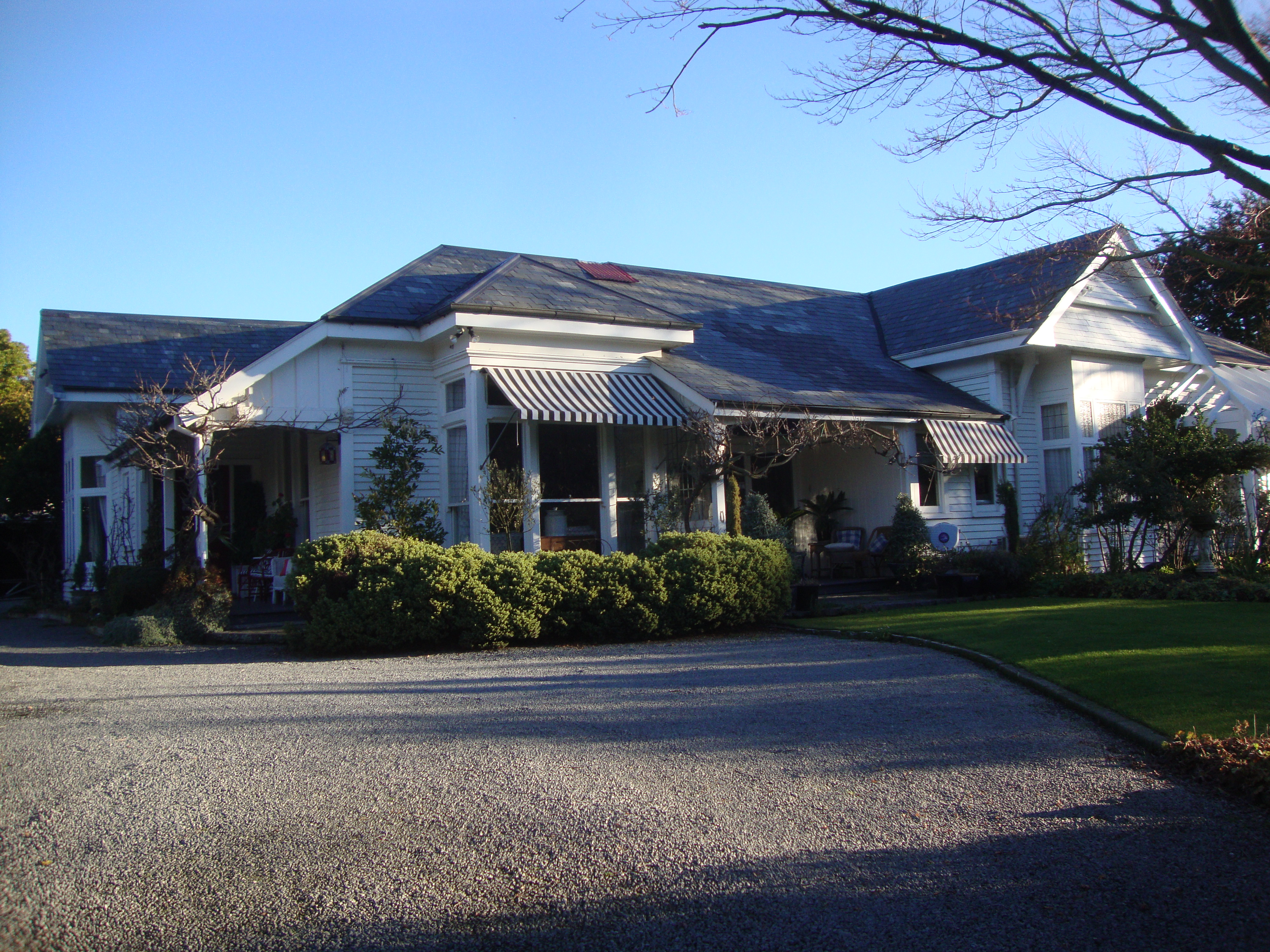
Kate Sheppard House was the Dougall family home from 1902 to 1939

Dougall married Harriet Catherine Wagner, daughter of J. S. Wagner of Christchurch, on 1 July 1886 at St John the Baptist Church. They had two sons and three daughters: Leslie Arthur (born 1887), Margaret Evelyn (born 1889), Stella Phoebe (born 1891), Walter Keith (born 1895), and Helen Edith (born 1902). His second son, Walter, was killed in action in France on 15 September 1916.

On 3 April 1902, Dougall bought the family home off Walter Sheppard in 83 Clyde Road in what is now known as the suburb of Ilam, but what was known as Waimairi at the time. Dougall appears to have also named the house "Waimairi" some time before his death. Sheppard, the husband of Kate Sheppard, had retired and intended to return to England. At the time, the area was still rural and their 2 acres (0.81 ha) property had a boundary with the farm previously owned by Alfred Richard Creyke; decades later, the new campus of the University of Canterbury was built on Creyke's former land.

Dougall died in Christchurch on 5 September 1934. He was buried at Waimairi Cemetery. The family home passed to his son Leslie, who sold the house in 1939.

The building was registered as a heritage building by Heritage New Zealand on 10 December 2010 with registration number 3659 classified as Category I listing. It was registered for its outstanding historical significance in relation to Sheppard, as much of the women's suffrage campaign was orchestrated from the house, and is today known as the Kate Sheppard House.
