= Richard Holland (disambiguation) =

Richard Holland (fl. 1450) was a Scottish writer.

Richard Holland may also refer to:

- Richard Holland (16th-century MP) (c. 1549–1618), Member of Parliament (MP) for Lancashire
- Richard Holland (Parliamentarian) (died 1661), English politician
- Richard Holland (horse breeder) (1805–1881), South Australian pastoralist
- Richard J. Holland (1925– 2000), American politician in the Virginia Senate
- Rick Holland (born 1978), English poet and artist
