= British Journal of Politics and International Relations =

- Discipline: Political science
- Language: English
- Edited by: Kingsley Edney, Derek Edyvane, Richard Hayton, Jack Holland, Victoria Honeyman, Viktoria Spaiser

Publication details
- History: 1999-present
- Publisher: SAGE Publishing on behalf of the Political Studies Association (United Kingdom)
- Frequency: Quarterly
- Impact factor: 3.4 (2024)

Standard abbreviations
- ISO 4: Br. J. Politics Int. Relat.

Indexing
- ISSN: 1369-1481 (print); 1467-856X (web)
- LCCN: sn99033216
- OCLC no.: 49056411

Links
- Journal homepage; Online access; Online archive; Journal page at society website

The British Journal of Politics and International Relations is a quarterly peer-reviewed academic journal published by SAGE Publishing on behalf of the Political Studies Association. It was established in 1999 and until 2016 published by Wiley-Blackwell. The editors-in-chief are Kingsley Edney, Derek Edyvane, Richard Hayton, Jack Holland, Victoria Honeyman, and Viktoria Spaiser (University of Leeds).

According to the latest Clarivate rankings, the journal has a 2024 impact factor of 3.4. and ranks 14th out of 169 journals in the field of International Relations.

== See also ==
- List of political science journals
- List of international relations journals
