= Matthew S. Holland =

6th President of Utah Valley University

Matthew Holland

6th President of Utah Valley University
- In office June 2009 – June 2018
- Preceded by: Elizabeth Hitch
- Succeeded by: Astrid S. Tuminez

Personal details
- Born: June 7, 1966 (age 60) Provo, Utah, U.S.
- Spouse: Paige Holland
- Children: 4
- Parent(s): Jeffrey Roy and Patricia Terry Holland
- Education: Brigham Young University (BA); Duke University (MA, PhD)

Matthew Scott Holland (born June 7, 1966) is an American religious leader and former educator who has been a general authority of the Church of Jesus Christ of Latter-day Saints (LDS Church) since 2020. Before becoming a general authority, Holland served from 2009 to 2018 as the 6th president of Utah Valley University (UVU) in Orem, Utah.

Holland is the son of Jeffrey R. Holland, a former president of the LDS Church's Quorum of the Twelve Apostles and a former president of Brigham Young University (BYU) in Provo, Utah.

== Early life and education ==
Holland was born on June 7, 1966, in Provo, Utah. After graduating from high school, he was a full-time LDS Church missionary in Scotland from 1985 to 1987. He then attended BYU, graduating in 1991 with a Bachelor of Arts in political science as the valedictorian of the university's College of Family and Social Sciences.

From 1992 to 1994, Holland worked for the consulting firm Monitor Group (now Monitor Deloitte) as chief of staff to the CEO. He then did graduate study in political science at Duke University, receiving a Master of Arts in 1997 and a Ph.D. in 2000. He also received academic fellowships to study at Princeton University as a James Madison Fellow and at the Hebrew University of Jerusalem as a Raoul Wallenberg Scholar.

== Biography ==
Holland was selected as UVU's sixth president by the Utah State Board of Regents in the spring of 2009 and began his tenure on June 1 of that year, succeeding interim president Elizabeth Hitch. Following the transition from a state college to a university in the summer of 2008, Holland became the first president of the university. Prior to joining UVU, Holland was an associate professor in the political science department at BYU.

Building on his dissertation, Holland published Bonds of Affection: Civic Charity and the Making of America with Georgetown University Press in 2007.

Holland was a special assistant to former Utah Governor Mike Leavitt. As a BYU faculty member, his emphasis on applied learning concepts led to his selection as the institution’s “Civically Engaged Scholar of the Year” by Utah Campus Compact. Previous to service at UVU, Holland was on the board of the National Organization for Marriage, which is a political organization which opposes same-sex marriage.

Holland is a member of the American Political Science Association and the American Historical Association. He also serves on boards, including the Deseret News Editorial Advisory Board, Utah Technology Council and the Salt Lake Chamber. Holland received the NESA Outstanding Eagle Scout Award through the Utah National Parks Council of BSA in 2011.

On November 6, 2017, Holland announced that he would leave his position at UVU in June 2018 to serve as an LDS Church mission president. He was subsequently assigned to the church's North Carolina Raleigh Mission. In April 2018, it was announced that Astrid S. Tuminez would succeed Holland as president. On April 4, 2020, Holland was sustained as an LDS Church general authority.

== Personal life ==
Holland's wife, Paige, is also a Utah Valley native, graduating from Timpview High School in Provo before enrolling at BYU. The Hollands are the parents of four children.

== Publications ==
- Holland, Matthew S (2007). Bonds of Affection: Civic Charity and the Making of America—Winthrop, Jefferson, and Lincoln. Washington DC: Georgetown University Press. ISBN 978-1-58901-183-0.

Academic offices
Preceded by Elizabeth Hitch (interim)	President of Utah Valley University; 2009–2018	Succeeded by Astrid S. Tuminez
