= Henry Holland (mayor) =

New Zealand politician

Henry Holland CBE
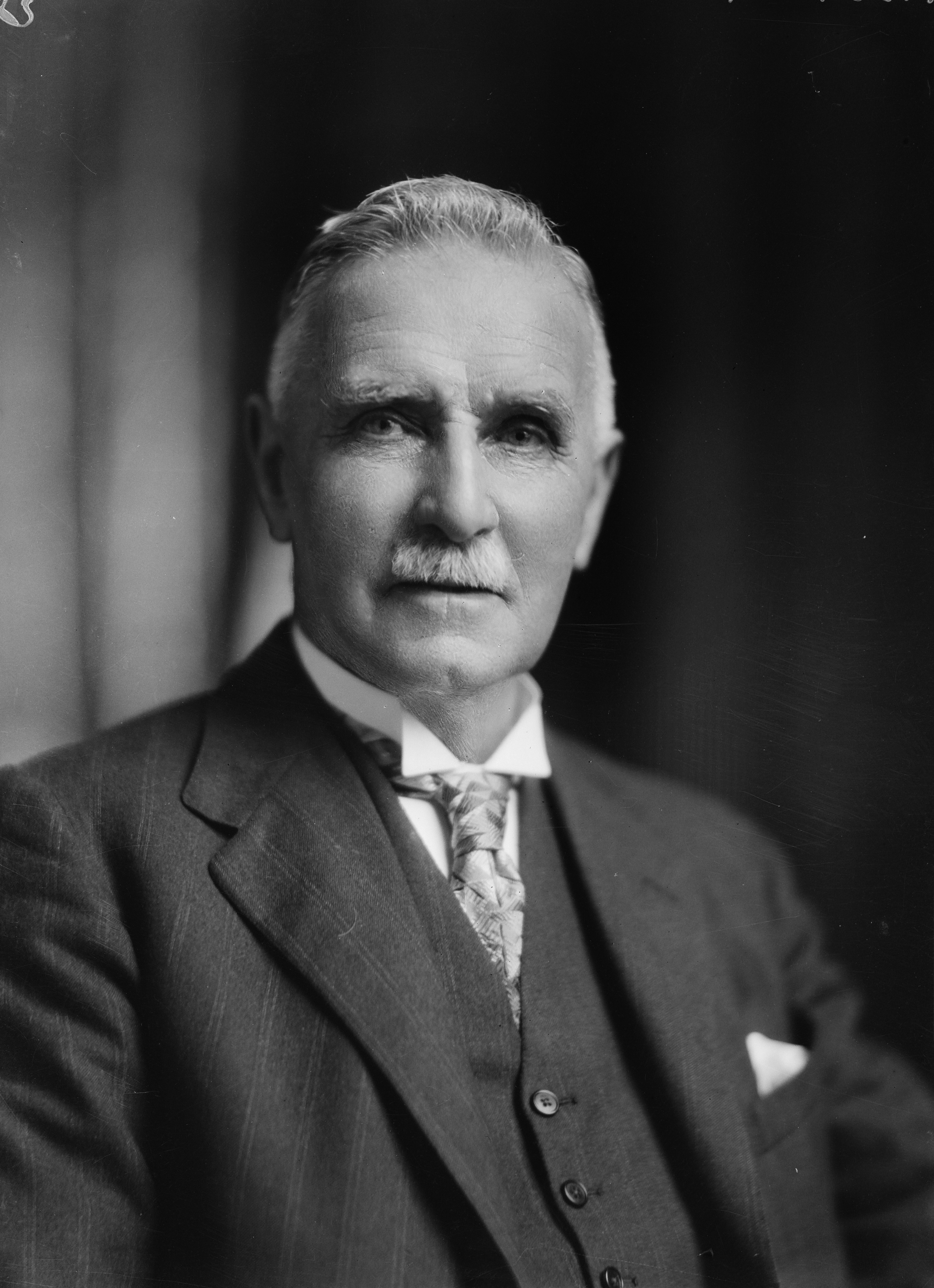
- Holland, c. 1929

Member of the New Zealand Parliament for Christchurch North
- In office 1925–1935
- Preceded by: Leonard Isitt
- Succeeded by: his son Sidney Holland

31st Mayor of Christchurch
- In office 1 May 1912 – 1919
- Preceded by: John Joseph Dougall
- Succeeded by: Henry Thacker

Personal details
- Born: 7 December 1859 Nafferton, East Riding of Yorkshire, England
- Died: 29 December 1944 (aged 85) New Zealand
- Resting place: Linwood Cemetery
- Children: Sidney Holland

Henry Holland CBE (7 December 1859 – 29 December 1944) was a New Zealand politician of the Reform Party, and Mayor of Christchurch from 1912 to 1919.

== Early life ==
Holland was born in Nafferton, East Riding of Yorkshire, England in 1859. His parents were the farmers Ann and Robert Holland, a farm laborer. The family emigrated to New Zealand in 1863 when Henry Holland was four, and settled in West Melton on an undeveloped farm. Holland received his education at a West Melton private school and the Halkett public school. He eventually began farming at Greendale on 100 acres in 1881. Four years later in October 1885, he married Jane Eastwood, a schoolteacher, in Christchurch; they would later have five sons and three daughters.

== Local government ==
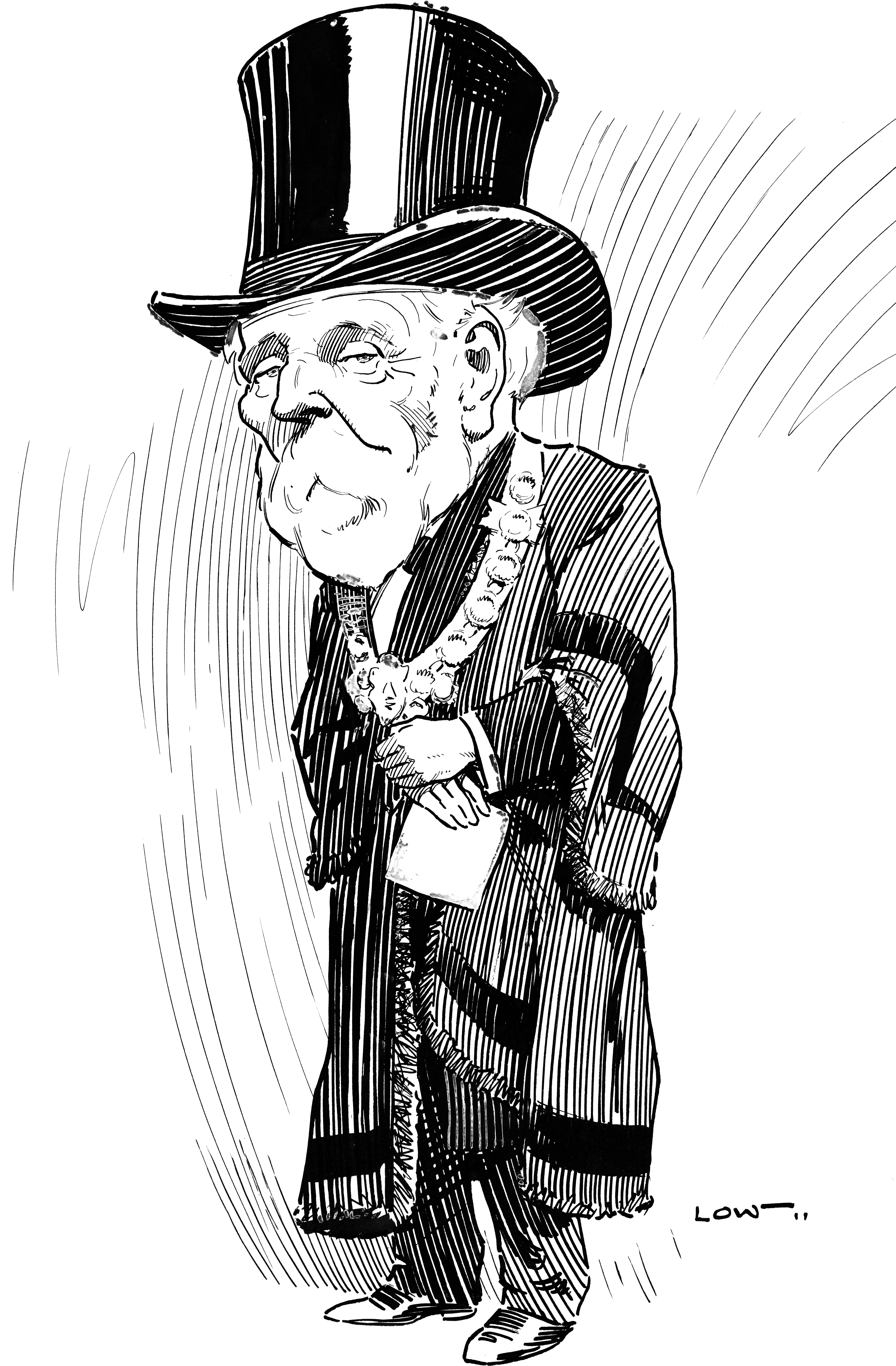
Holland with cloak and mayoral chain; cartoon by David Low

Holland was made a justice of the peace in 1907, and in 1911 was elected to the Christchurch City Council for the Central Ward. He was a friend of Tommy Taylor.

The 1912 mayoral election was held on 24 April, and it was contested by the incumbent John Joseph Dougall, Holland, and Henry Thacker. Like the previous election in April 1911, the incumbent came last. Holland was successful with 4,127 votes, with Thacker and Dougall receiving 2,931 and 2,637 votes, respectively. Holland was installed as mayor on 1 May 1912. He was challenged in 1915 by Henry Sorensen.

Holland was Mayor of Christchurch for seven years. The 1917 mayoral election was contested by Holland and the MP James McCombs along the lines of win-the-war (Holland) and anti-conscription (McCombs). The result was a crushing defeat of McCombs; Holland received 12,177 votes and McCombs received 5,381. Holland retired from the mayoralty in 1919; the election was contested by three candidates.

In the 1918 New Year Honours, Holland and his wife, Jane (née Eastwood), were appointed Officers of the Order of the British Empire for service in World War I. He was subsequently promoted to Commander of the Order of the British Empire, for services in connection with patriotic undertakings, in the 1919 King's Birthday Honours.

He was a board member of the Lyttelton Harbour Board and was chairman of the board from 5 June 1929 to 5 June 1930.

== Member of Parliament ==
New Zealand Parliament
Years	Term	Electorate	Party
1925–1928	22nd	Christchurch North	Reform
1928–1931	23rd	Christchurch North	Reform
1931–1935	24th	Christchurch North	Reform

Henry Holland was the Member of Parliament for Christchurch North from 1925 to 1935, when he retired.

In 1935, Holland was awarded the King George V Silver Jubilee Medal.

His son, Sidney Holland, was the 25th Prime Minister from 1949 to 1957.

== Death ==
Holland died on 29 December 1944 and was buried at Linwood Cemetery.

New Zealand Parliament
Preceded by Leonard Isitt	Member of Parliament for Christchurch North; 1925–1935	Succeeded by Sidney Holland
Political offices
Preceded by John Joseph Dougall	Mayor of Christchurch; 1912–1919	Succeeded by Henry Thacker
Preceded by Robert Galbraith	Chairman of the Lyttelton Harbour Board; 1929–1930	Succeeded by Tim Armstrong
