= Patricia T. Holland =

American educator and religious leader (1942–2023)

First Counselor, Young Women General Presidency
- 1984 – April 6, 1986
- Called by: Spencer W. Kimball
- Predecessor: Arlene B. Darger
- Successor: Maurine J. Turley

Personal details
- Born: Patricia Terry; February 16, 1942; Enterprise, Utah, U.S.
- Died: July 20, 2023 (aged 81); Salt Lake City, Utah, U.S.
- Alma mater: Dixie College, Juilliard School
- Spouse(s): Jeffrey R. Holland (m. 1963)
- Children: 3; including Matthew and David

Patricia Terry Holland (February 16, 1942 – July 20, 2023) was an American educator, writer, and religious leader in the Church of Jesus Christ of Latter-day Saints. She was a counselor in the church's Young Women General Presidency from 1984 to 1986. From 1980 to 1989, Holland was "first lady" of Brigham Young University (BYU) where her husband, Jeffrey R. Holland, was president of the institution.

== Religious service and contributions ==
In 1984, Holland was called as first counselor to Ardeth G. Kapp in the Young Women General Presidency. She was released in 1986 to fulfill obligations at BYU, where her husband was president. Holland was succeeded by Maurine J. Turley, who had been serving as the second counselor in the Young Women General Presidency.

In 2000, Holland published the book A Quiet Heart, about responding to chaos. This book won the Association for Mormon Letters Award in 2000 for devotional literature. In 2012, she received the "Distinguished Alumnus Award" from LDS Business College (LDSBC) for her contributions to the family, her church, and community.

== Personal life and death ==
Holland studied at LDSBC in 1961, and later studied at Dixie College and the Juilliard School. In 1963, she married Jeffrey R. Holland, whom she had dated during high school in St. George, Utah.

Holland and her husband were the parents of three children, including Matthew S. Holland, who was president of Utah Valley University from 2009 to 2018.

Holland died in Salt Lake City on July 20, 2023, at the age of 81.

== Speeches and publications ==
- Jeffrey R. Holland and Patricia T. Holland, "The Demands of Discipleship", BYU Speeches, 1983-09-13
- Patricia T. Holland, "The Fruits of Peace", Ensign, June 1984
- Jeffrey R. Holland and Patricia T. Holland, "In the Thick of Life's Urgencies", BYU Speeches, 1984-09-11
- Jeffrey R. Holland and Patricia T. Holland, "Unless You're a Mormon", BYU Speeches, 1986-09-09
- Patricia T. Holland, ,BYU Speeches, 1987-01-13
- Patricia T. Holland, "Fear Not", BYU Speeches, 1987-09-15
- Patricia T. Holland, "'One Thing Needful': Becoming Women of Greater Faith in Christ", Ensign, October 1987
- Patricia T. Holland, "Filling the Measure of Your Creation", BYU Speeches, 1989-01-17
- Jeffrey R. Holland and Patricia T. Holland, On Earth as it is in Heaven (Salt Lake City, Utah: Deseret Book, 1994) ISBN 978-0875791869
- Patricia T. Holland, "God's Covenant of Peace", BYU Women's Conference, 1999
- Patricia T. Holland, A Quiet Heart (Salt Lake City, Utah: Bookcraft, 2000) ISBN 978-1573458016
- Jeffrey R. Holland and Patricia T. Holland, "What Time Is This?", BYU Women's Conference, 2007
