= Matt Holland (football manager) =

Welsh football manager (born 1988)

Personal information
- Full name: Matthew Mark Holland
- Date of birth: 12 July 1988 (age 38)
- Place of birth: Wales

Team information
- Current team: Guam (assistant)

Managerial career
- Years: Team
- 2012–2013: Football Australia (youth)
- 2013: Buriram United (youth)
- 2014–2015: NFDP (youth)
- 2015: Army United (assistant)
- 2015: Port (assistant)
- 2015: Ubon Eastern (analyst)
- 2015–2016: Bengaluru (assistant)
- 2016–2018: Buriram United (technical director)
- 2019: Perlis FA (director of football)
- 2019: Nongbua Pitchaya
- 2020–2022: Lee Man (youth)
- 2022: Port (assistant)
- 2022–2023: Port
- 2023: Guam (assistant)
- 2023–2024: Afghanistan (assistant)
- 2024–2025: Hong Kong (assistant)
- 2024–2025: Lee Man
- 2025–: Guam (assistant)

Matthew Mark Holland (born 12 July 1988) is a Welsh professional football manager who is an assistant manager of the Guam national football team.

== Career ==
During the winter of 2012, Holland was appointed as a youth manager of Football Australia. Following his stint there, he was appointed as an analyst of Thai side Ubon Eastern in 2015. The same year, he was appointed as an assistant manager of Indian side Bengaluru, helping the club win the league title. One year later, he returned to Thai side Buriram United as technical director.

Ahead of the 2019 season, he was appointed director of football of Malaysian side Perlis FA. Six months later, he was appointed manager of Thai side Nongbua Pitchaya. In 2023, he was appointed as an assistant manager of the Guam national football team, before being appointed as an assistant manager of the Afghanistan national football team one month later. Subsequently, he was appointed manager of Hong Kong side Lee Man.

== Personal life ==
Holland was born on 12 July 1988. Born in Wales, he obtained the AFC Professional Coaching Diploma.
