= David F. Holland =

American professor and historian (born 1973)

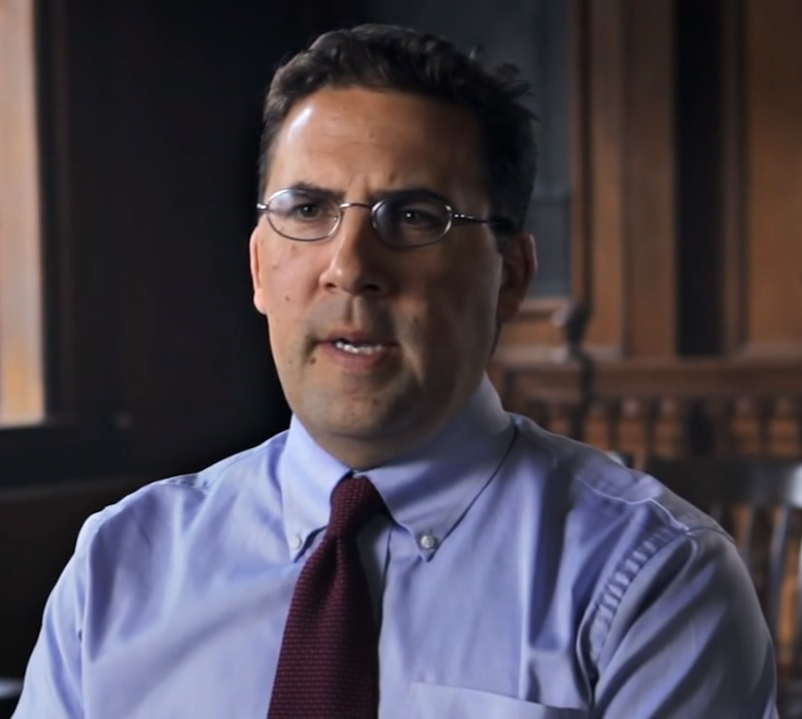
- Holland in 2016
- Born: 1973 (age 52–53); United States
- Education: Brigham Young University (BA); Stanford University (MA, PhD)
- Occupation: Professor of American Religious History
- Website: Harvard University Faculty Profile

David Frank Holland (born 1973) is an American professor and historian. He is currently the John A. Bartlett Professor of New England Church History at Harvard Divinity School, where he also was appointed as interim dean during the Fall 2023 semester. He was previously a director of graduate studies in religion at Harvard University and an associate professor of history at University of Nevada, Las Vegas.

== Biography ==
Holland graduated summa cum laude with a bachelor's degree in history from Brigham Young University (BYU) and subsequently received an M.A. and Ph.D. in history from Stanford University. While he was a graduate student, Holland took a summer seminar in Mormon History at BYU with Richard Bushman. He has held fellowships from the Mellon Foundation, the Whiting Foundation, and Yale's Center for Religion and American Life.

Holland's noted articles include "From Anne Hutchinson to Horace Bushnell: A New Take on the New England Sequence" (The New England Quarterly, 2005), and " 'A Mixed Construction of Subversion and Conversion': The Complicated Lives and Times of Religious Women" (Gender and History, 2010).

In 2011, Holland was named the Nevada professor of the year by the Carnegie Foundation for the Advancement of Teaching.

== Personal life ==
Holland is a member of the Church of Jesus Christ of Latter-day Saints, and a son of Jeffrey R. Holland and Patricia T. Holland. He previously served in the church as a missionary in Czechoslovakia, as bishop in Nevada, and as president of the Worcester Massachusetts Stake.

== Published works ==
- Holland, David F. (2011), Sacred Borders: Continuing Revelation and Canonical Restraint in Early America, Oxford University Press, ISBN 978-0199753611
- —— (2020), Moroni: a brief theological introduction, The Neal A Maxwell Institute for Religious Scholarship, ISBN 978-0842500135
