= Okains Bay =

Settlement in Canterbury, New Zealand

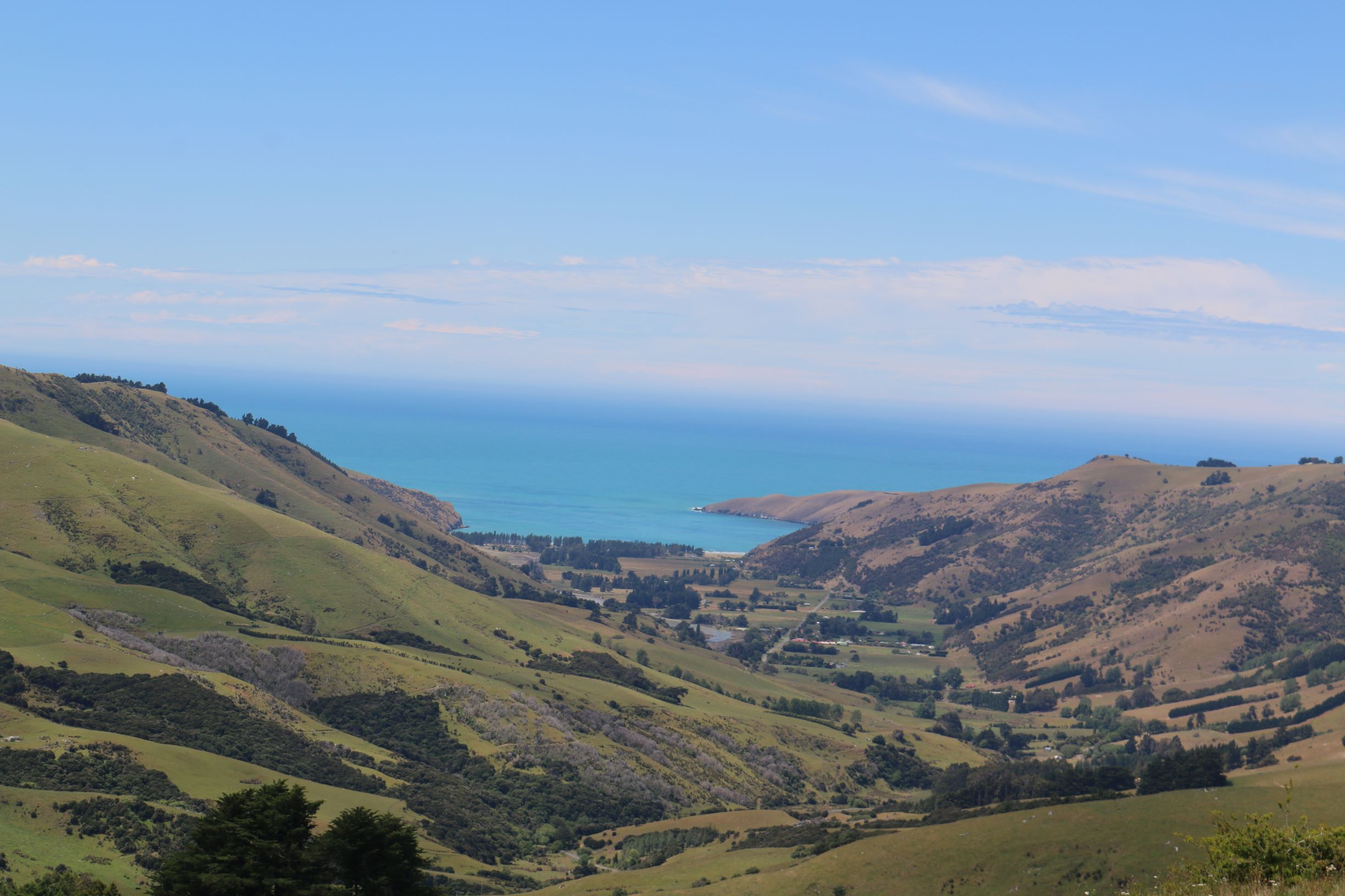
- Okains Bay in December 2020
- Interactive map of Okains Bay
- Coordinates: 43°43′S 173°02′E
- Country: New Zealand
- Region: Canterbury Region
- District: Christchurch City
- Ward: Banks Peninsula
- Community: Te Pātaka o Rākaihautū Banks Peninsula
- Electorates: Banks Peninsula; Te Tai Tonga (Māori)

Government
  - Territorial Authority: Christchurch City Council
  - Regional council: Environment Canterbury
  - Mayor of Christchurch: Phil Mauger
  - Banks Peninsula MP: Vanessa Weenink
  - Te Tai Tonga MP: Tākuta Ferris

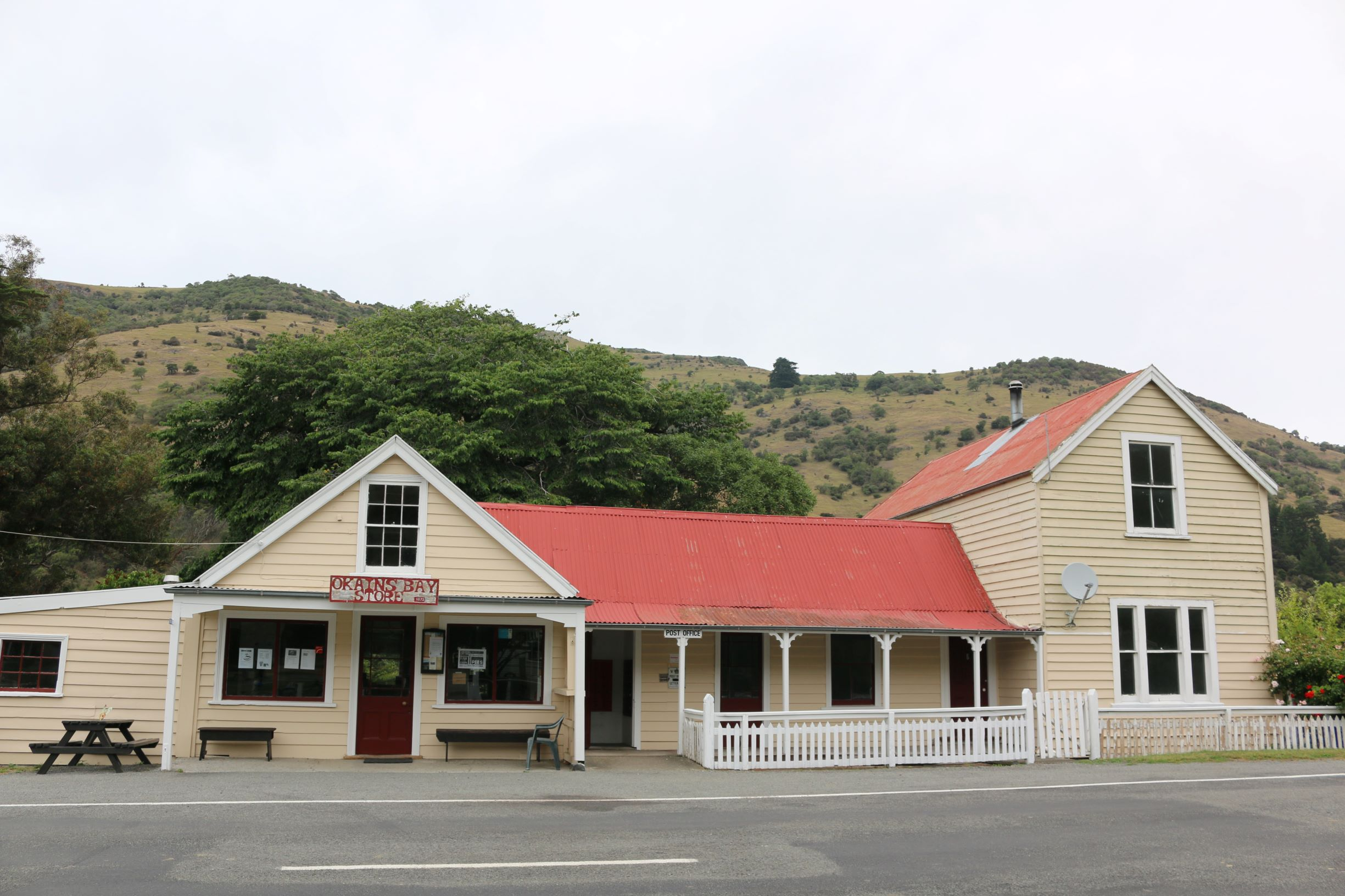
The Okains bay store and post office (December 2020)

Okains Bay is a settlement, beach and bay on the Banks Peninsula in the South Island of New Zealand.

It is located approximately 10 kilometres (6 mi) from the main town on the Banks Peninsula, Akaroa. It is 86 km (90 minutes drive) from Christchurch. The sandy beach is popular with tourists and has a river estuary emptying into the bay. The settlement itself contains the Okains Bay Maori and Colonial Museum. There is a camp ground on the beach near the estuary. The beach is often deserted and there is a large cave to explore at one end.

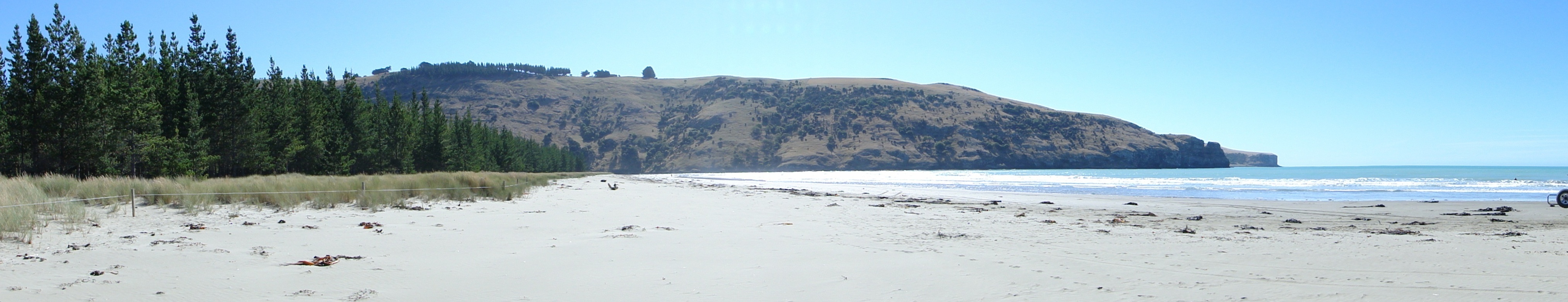
Okains Bay

== Māori settlement ==
Okains Bay is known as Kawatea in Māori. It is important to the Ngāi Tahu because a rangatira or chief called Moki established his pā or settlement here when Ngāi Tahu migrated to Canterbury. Okains Bay has been recognised as the first landing place of Ngāi Tahu on Banks Peninsula. Carbon dating of artefacts suggest that Māori were present in Okains bay in the 1300s.

== European settlement ==
Okains Bay gained its European name from Captain Hamilton, who, when sailing past, was reading a book written by Okain (O'Kane), an Irish naturalist. It was first settled by Europeans around 1850. By September 1850 the first sections of land were sold by the Canterbury Association to the first European settlers. Due to the lack of roads, transport was to and from Lyttelton (21 miles away) by a steamer, which stopped along the way at Little Akaloa.

The main sawmill began operating in 1874. It is now a shearing shed. Timber was moved by a trolley line to the first wharf which was situated at the centre of the beach. The cheese factory opened in 1894 and closed in 1968.

Three different wharves were built at different times to accommodate boats berthing at Okains Bay. They were used for transporting livestock, meat, wool, timber, grass seed, dairy produce, store provisions and people. The first two wharves became inoperable due to the movement of the sand around them. The third wharf was closed and demolished in 1964 and the timber from it was used to repair road bridges in 1964.

== Demographics ==
Okains Bay is part of the Banks Peninsula Eastern Bays statistical area.

Banks Peninsula Eastern Bays statistical area covers 368.03 km^{2} (142.10 sq mi). It had an estimated population of 570 as of June 2025, with a population density of 1.5 people per km^{2}.

Historical population for Banks Peninsula Eastern Bays
Year	Pop.	±% p.a.
2006	606	—
2013	600	−0.14%
2018	546	−1.87%
2023	576	+1.08%
The 2006 population is for a larger area of 368.25 km^{2}, which included Purau. Source:

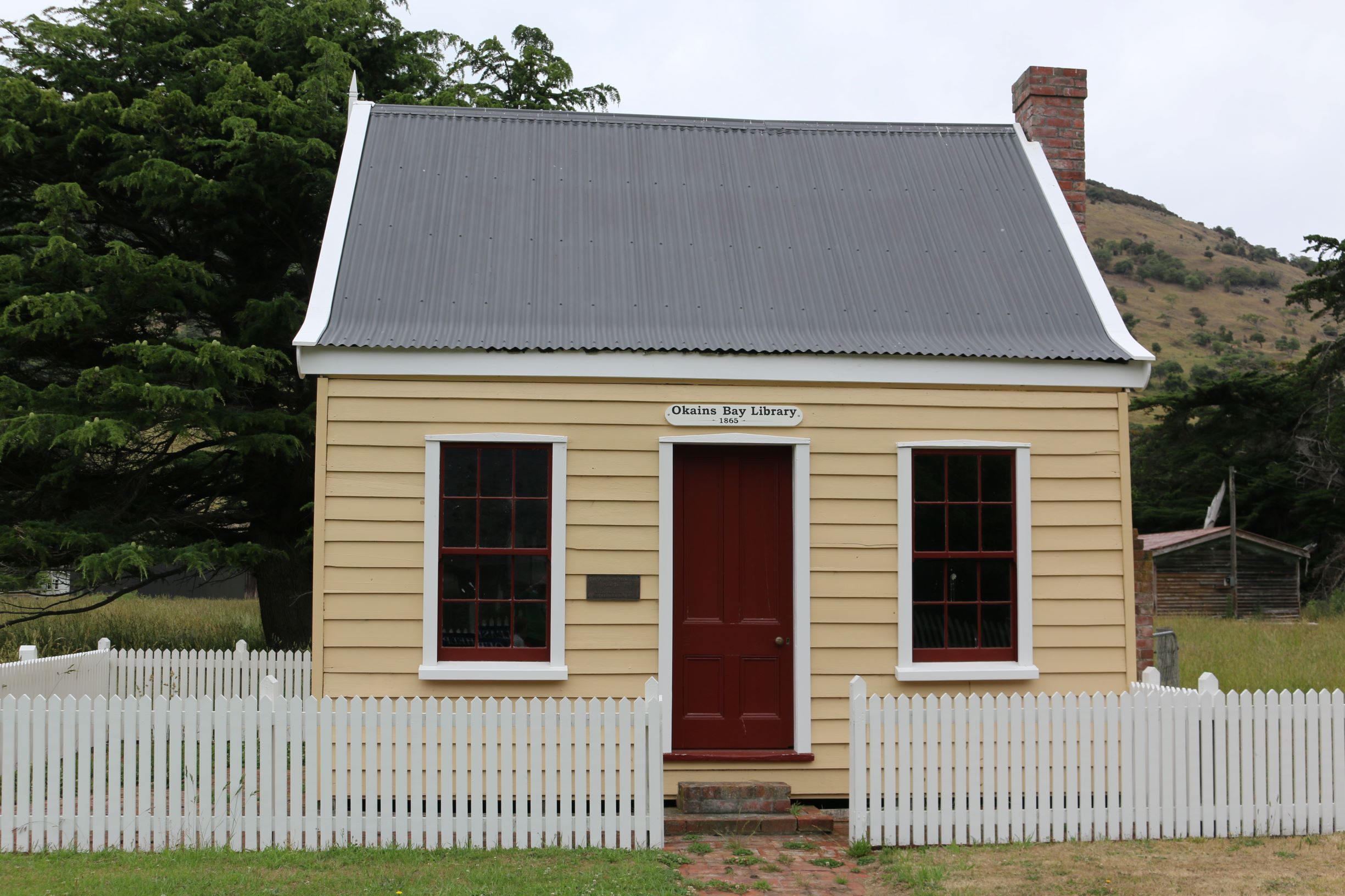
The Okains Bay Library

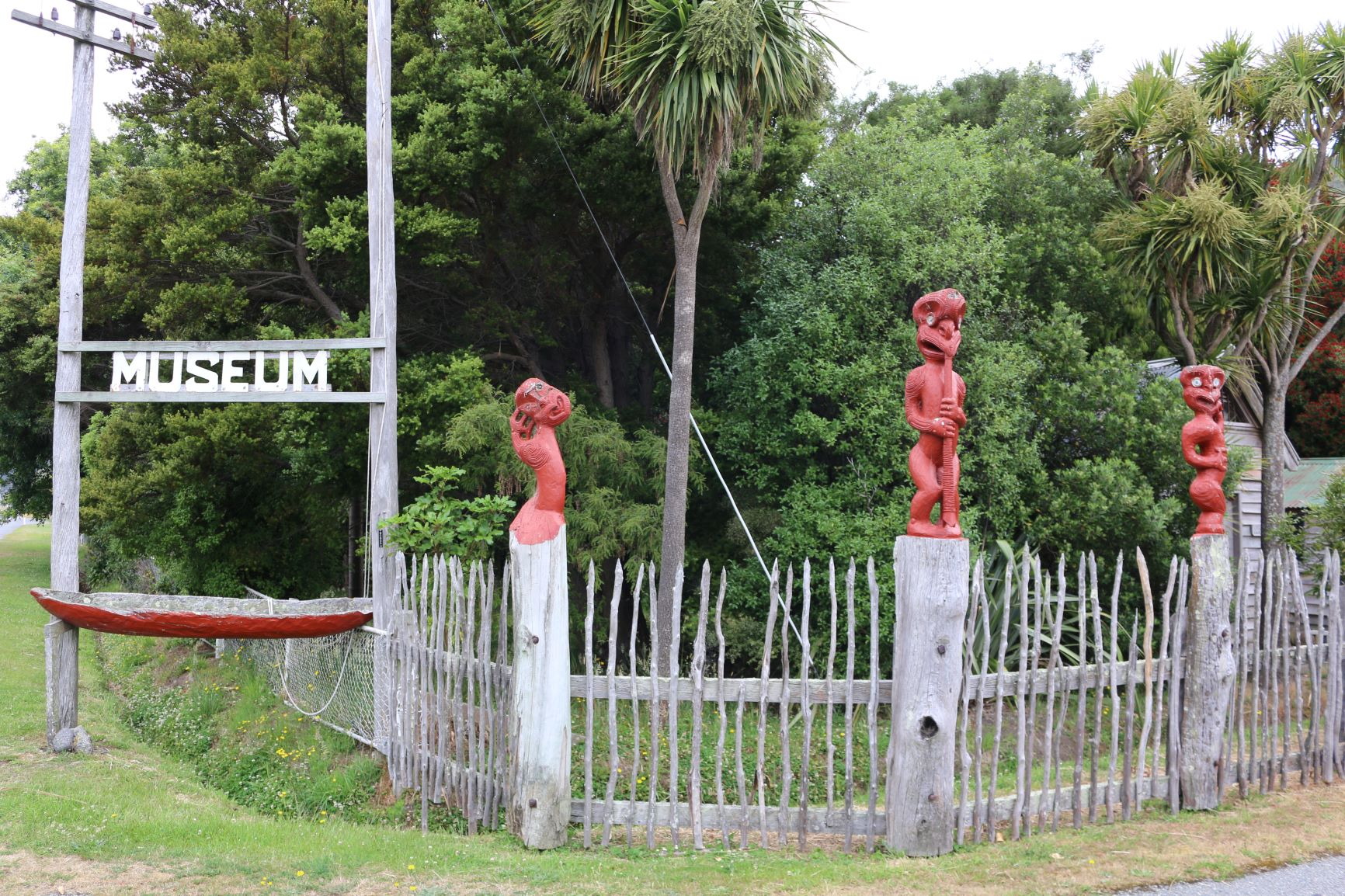
Okains Bay Museum (December 2020)

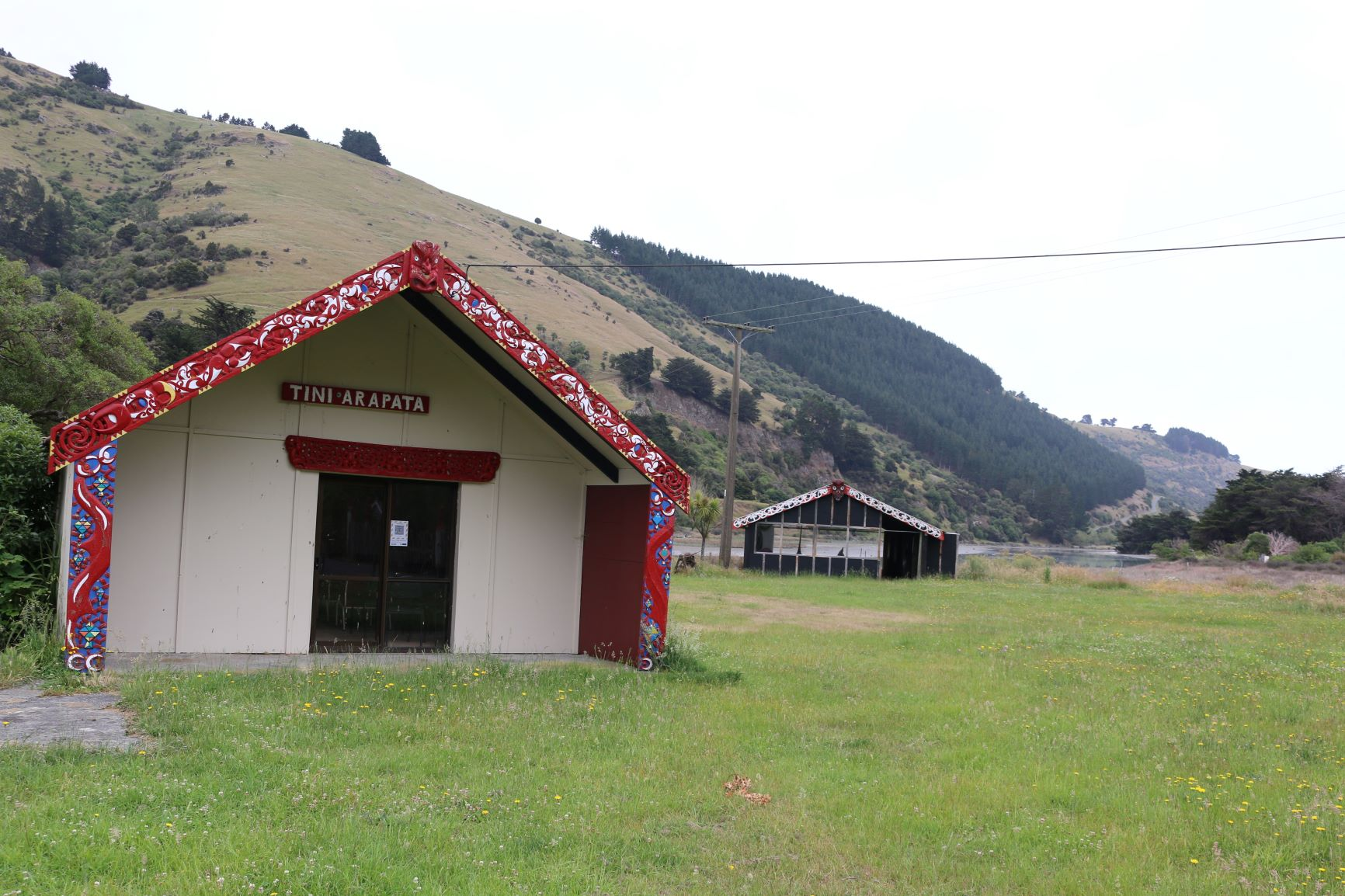
Tini Arapata Marae, Okains Bay. (December 2020)

Banks Peninsula Eastern Bays had a population of 576 in the 2023 New Zealand census, an increase of 30 people (5.5%) since the 2018 census, and a decrease of 24 people (−4.0%) since the 2013 census. There were 282 males, 291 females, and 3 people of other genders in 264 dwellings. 2.1% of people identified as LGBTIQ+. The median age was 52.7 years (compared with 38.1 years nationally). There were 84 people (14.6%) aged under 15 years, 51 (8.9%) aged 15 to 29, 285 (49.5%) aged 30 to 64, and 153 (26.6%) aged 65 or older.

People could identify as more than one ethnicity. The results were 92.7% European (Pākehā); 15.6% Māori; 1.0% Pasifika; 2.1% Asian; 0.5% Middle Eastern, Latin American and African New Zealanders (MELAA); and 2.1% other, which includes people giving their ethnicity as "New Zealander". English was spoken by 99.0%, Māori by 3.1%, and other languages by 8.9%. No language could be spoken by 1.0% (e.g. too young to talk). New Zealand Sign Language was known by 0.5%. The percentage of people born overseas was 19.3, compared with 28.8% nationally.

Religious affiliations were 29.7% Christian, 0.5% Islam, 0.5% Māori religious beliefs, 1.0% Buddhist, 0.5% New Age, and 1.0% other religions. People who answered that they had no religion were 57.3%, and 9.4% of people did not answer the census question.

Of those at least 15 years old, 150 (30.5%) people had a bachelor's or higher degree, 273 (55.5%) had a post-high school certificate or diploma, and 69 (14.0%) people exclusively held high school qualifications. The median income was $34,200, compared with $41,500 nationally. 51 people (10.4%) earned over $100,000 compared to 12.1% nationally. The employment status of those at least 15 was 228 (46.3%) full-time, 99 (20.1%) part-time, and 9 (1.8%) unemployed.

== Notable buildings ==
=== The Maori and Colonial Museum ===
Originally a cheese factory, the museum was developed thanks to the enthusiasm and collection of Murray Thacker, a local resident who spent his childhood collecting Māori taonga from local beaches. The collection includes tiki, fishing equipment, tools, weapons, cloaks and is of national significance.

=== Tini Arapata marae ===
The Tini Arapata marae was named by Aunty Jane Manahi for her mother, Tini Arapata Horau.

=== Okains school ===
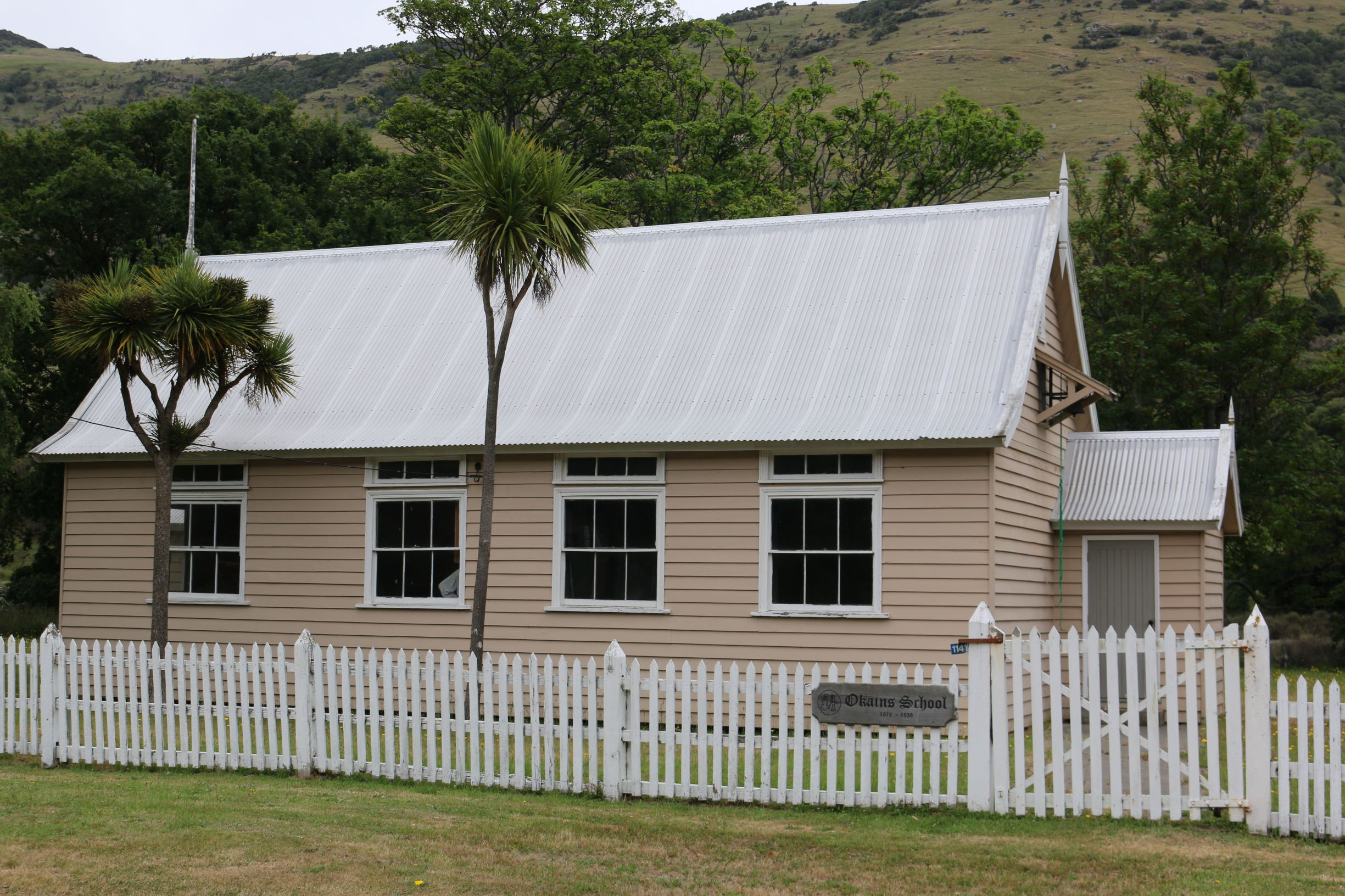
Okains Bay School Building (December 2020)

The original Okains Bay school building. This was built in 1872 and used until 1938.

=== Petrol station ===
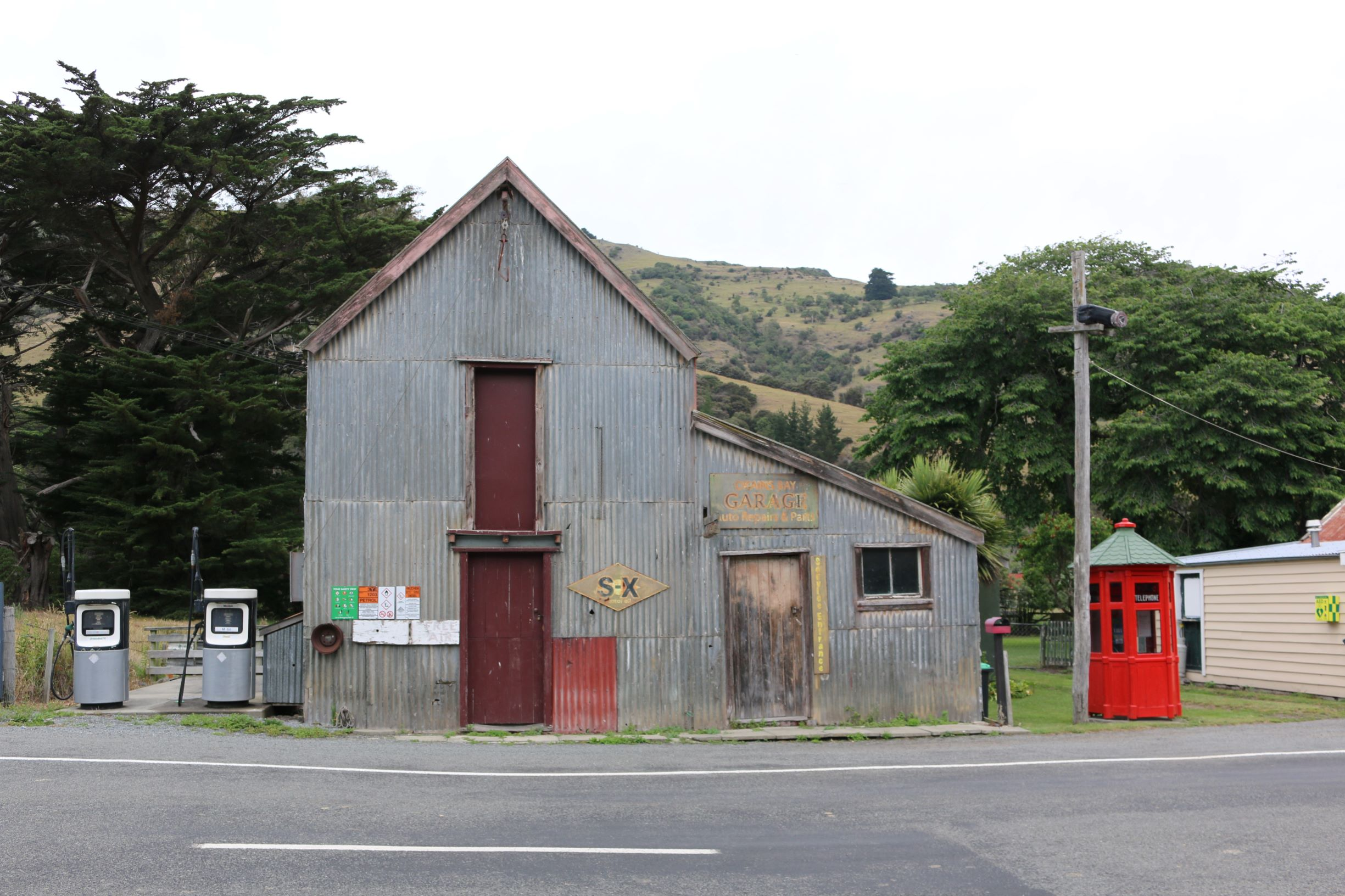
The rustic Okains Bay petrol station (December 2020)

=== Okains Bay store and post office ===
The store and post office were built in 1873.

=== Library ===
The Library was built in 1865.

=== St John the Evangelist Anglican church ===
The church was completed in June 1863. The total cost was 554 pounds, nine shillings and eight pence. It was built by a Mr. Morey, a stonemason. The stone and timber were all sourced locally and the slate roof and the stained glass were obtained from England.

In 1884 the organ was purchased from St Barnabas Church in Fendalton. The church bell was donated by the vicar in 1912. IN 1955, 400 pounds was spent repointing the stone work and other repairs. The floor began to crumble in 1959 due to dry rot. A concrete floor was laid.

The church was in 2020 the second oldest standing stone church in the diocese of Christchurch. It was severely damaged by the 2010 and 2011 Canterbury earthquakes.

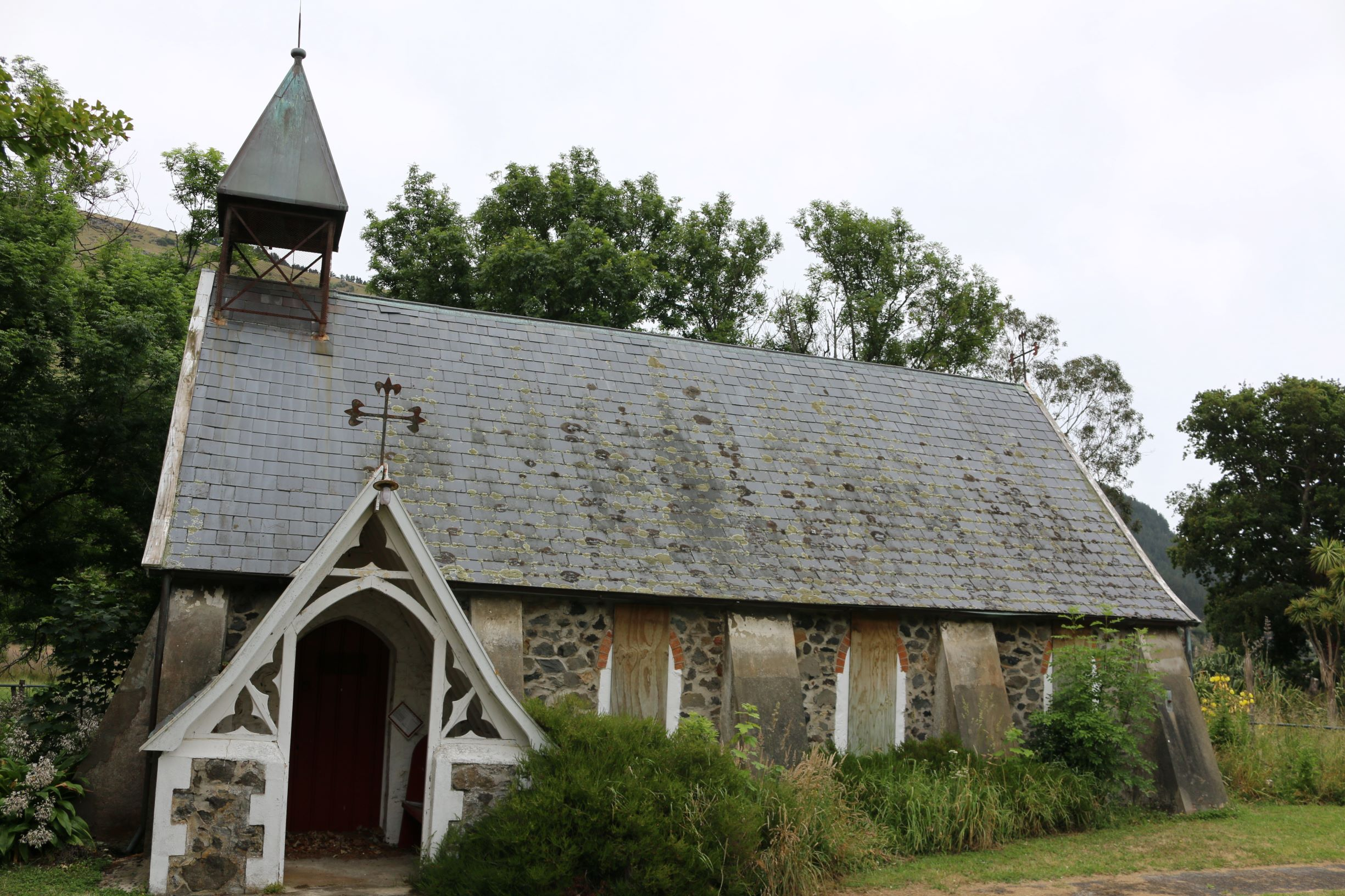
St John the Evangelist Anglican Church (December 2020)
