= Tom Holland (disambiguation) =

Tom Holland (born 1996) is an English actor.

Tom Holland may also refer to:

- Tom Holland (Australian footballer) (1885–1946), Australian footballer
- Tom Holland (footballer, born 1902) (1902–1987), English footballer
- Tom Holland (artist) (born 1936), American visual artist
- Tom Holland (filmmaker) (born 1943), American film director
- Tom Holland (politician) (born 1961), Kansas state senator
- Tom Holland (author) (born 1968), British author, BBC documentarist and historian
- Tom Holland (footballer, born 1997), English footballer

== See also ==
- Tom Hollander (born 1967), English actor
- Thom Haaland (born 1967), Norwegian sailor
- Thomas Holland (disambiguation)
