= John Robert Holland =

American lawyer

John Robert Holland is an American lawyer.

== Legal career ==
Holland is notable for taking on pro bono civil rights and human rights cases. Holland took on civil rights cases early in his career. His daughter and partner, Anna Cayton-Holland convinced him to return to human rights work, and their practice took on four Guantanamo captives.

=== Early career ===
While a law student at UCLA Holland interned with the Zuni Legal Aid Society in New Mexico. Upon graduation he received a Reginald Heber Smith Community Lawyer Fellowship, which allowed him to work for three years for the Denver Legal Aid Society. After his fellowship expired he continued to work for the Denver Legal Aid Society, until he entered private practice in 1979.

=== Private practice ===
One area Holland specialized in has been the legal issues around nursing homes. He has written and lectured on this topic.

=== Human rights cases ===
Holland has a long history of taking on human rights cases.

=== Guantanamo captives ===
Mohammed Al Amin, a Mauritanian youth, who was seventeen years old when he was captured, was released on September 26, 2007.

Holland has visited the Guantanamo Bay detention camps four times.

Commenting on the difficulties of aiding Guantanamo captives Holland said:

Even after almost four years, we're still working on trust, And honestly, why should they trust us? ... Why do they even need a lawyer? What's the use? What good is a lawyer when there is no true legal system for them?
