= John Holland (cricketer) =

English cricketer

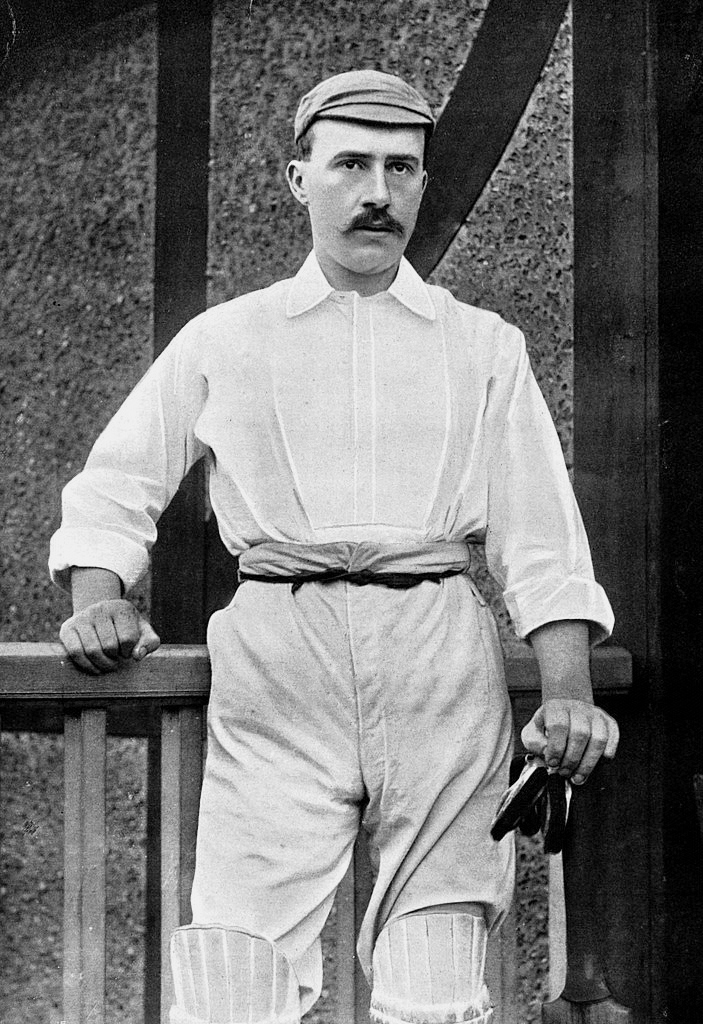

Personal information
- Born: 7 April 1869; Acton, Cheshire, England
- Died: 22 August 1914 (aged 45); Bury, Lancashire, England
- Batting: Right-handed

Domestic team information
- Years: Team
- 1894–1896: Leicestershire
- 1900–1902: Lancashire

Career statistics
Competition	First-class
Matches	54
Runs scored	1,755
Batting average	17.55
100s/50s	0/4
Top score	65
Balls bowled	70
Wickets	0
Bowling average	–
5 wickets in innings	–
10 wickets in match	–
Best bowling	–
Catches/stumpings	25/–
- Source: CricketArchive, 29 August 2012

John Holland (7 April 1869 – 22 August 1914) was a cricketer who played first-class cricket for Leicestershire and Lancashire between 1894 and 1902. He was born at Acton, Cheshire in 1869.

Holland played a total of 54 first-class matches, scoring 1,755 runs. He died at Bury, Lancashire in 1914.
