= Samuel H. Holland =

Arkansas politician

Member of the Arkansas Senate from the 22nd district
- In office January 6, 1873 – May 28, 1874 Serving with S. A. Duke
- Succeeded by: redistricted

Samuel H. Holland was a state senator in Arkansas in 1873 and, for a special session, in 1874 during the Reconstruction era. He also served as a teacher, sheriff, jailer, and principal. He taught at the Howard School, named for Oliver O. Howard, until it was closed by the school board in 1871. The school building was used by the United Sons of Ham, a secret African American benevolent organization. He was involved in the establishment of millage fees to fund area schools.

Howard served in the Arkansas Senate during the 19th Arkansas General Assembly. He represented the 22nd district, which consisted of Ashley, Chicot, Drew, Desha, and Lincoln counties, alongside S. A. Duke. He is registered as representing the same constituency during the 1874 Extraordinary Arkansas General Assembly called by Governor Elisha Baxter, but is listed as not present by the Arkansas Secretary of State.
