= Jeffrey R. Holland =

American educator and religious leader (1940–2025)

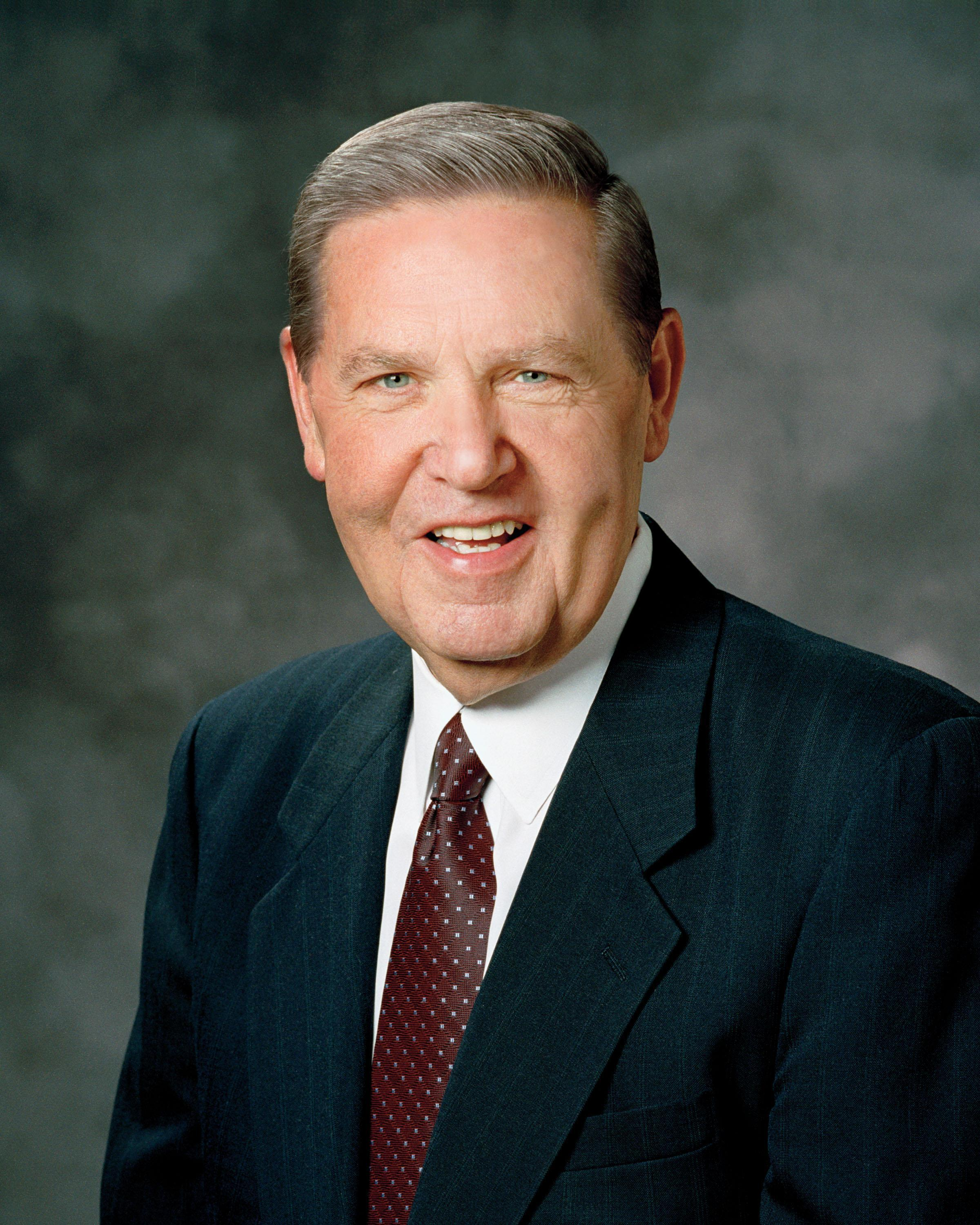

President of the Quorum of the Twelve Apostles
- October 14, 2025 – December 27, 2025
- Predecessor: Dallin H. Oaks
- Successor: Henry B. Eyring

Acting President of the Quorum of the Twelve Apostles
- November 15, 2023 – September 27, 2025
- Called by: Russell M. Nelson
- Predecessor: M. Russell Ballard
- End reason: Death of Russell M. Nelson

Quorum of the Twelve Apostles
- June 23, 1994 – December 27, 2025
- Called by: Howard W. Hunter

LDS Church Apostle
- June 23, 1994 – December 27, 2025
- Called by: Howard W. Hunter
- Reason: Death of Ezra Taft Benson; reorganization of First Presidency
- Reorganization at end of term: Clark G. Gilbert ordained

First Quorum of the Seventy
- April 1, 1989 – June 23, 1994
- Called by: Ezra Taft Benson
- End reason: Called to the Quorum of the Twelve Apostles

9th President of Brigham Young University

In office
- September 1980 – 1989
- Predecessor: Dallin H. Oaks
- Successor: Rex E. Lee

Personal details
- Born: Jeffrey Roy Holland; December 3, 1940; St. George, Utah, U.S.
- Died: December 27, 2025 (aged 85); Salt Lake City, Utah, U.S.
- Education: Brigham Young University (BA, MA); Yale University (MA, PhD)
- Spouse(s): Patricia Terry (m. 1963; died 2023)
- Children: 3; including Matthew and David
- Signature
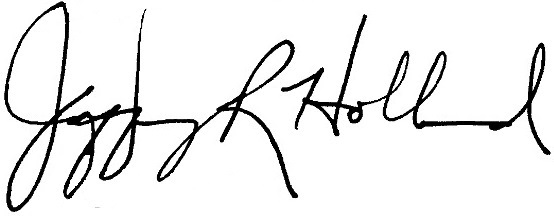

Jeffrey Roy Holland (December 3, 1940 – December 27, 2025) was an American educator and a religious leader. He was president of the Quorum of the Twelve Apostles of the Church of Jesus Christ of Latter-day Saints (LDS Church) from October 14, 2025, until his death. He was the ninth president of Brigham Young University (BYU) and was acting president of the Quorum of the Twelve Apostles from November 15, 2023 until September 27, 2025, when the First Presidency was dissolved as a result of church president Russell M. Nelson's death.

As a member of the Quorum of the Twelve, Holland was accepted by the church as a prophet, seer, and revelator. At the time of his death, he was the church's second most senior apostle.

Holland was born and raised in St. George, Utah. After graduating from high school, his college education began at Dixie College and he also served as an LDS Church missionary in Great Britain. After returning from his mission, he transferred to BYU and graduated with a bachelor's degree in English. He later earned a master's degree (MA) in religious education at BYU. Holland received a second master's degree and later a PhD in American studies at Yale University. In 1974, Holland was appointed BYU's dean of religious education. Two years later he was appointed the eleventh commissioner of the Church Educational System (CES), replacing Neal A. Maxwell. In 1980, Holland became BYU's ninth president, replacing Dallin H. Oaks.

== Early life and education ==
Holland was born in St. George, Utah, on December 3, 1940. His father, Frank D. Holland, was a convert to the LDS Church, while his mother, Alice, came from a long line of Latter-day Saints. As a youth, he worked as a newspaper carrier, a grocery bagger, and a service station attendant. As a young man, Holland served in what was then known as the British Mission. His mission president was Marion D. Hanks, a church general authority. He and Quentin L. Cook were missionary companions.

He graduated from Dixie High School in 1959, and he helped the Flyers capture state high school championships in football and basketball. He began his college education at Dixie College before his mission. After returning from his mission, he served as co-captain of the Dixie basketball team. In 2011, the school broke ground for the Jeffrey R. Holland Centennial Commons Building, a building to honor both Holland and the school's 2011 centennial. The completed building was dedicated in September 2012.

Holland transferred to BYU, where he graduated with a bachelor's degree in English. He did graduate study in religious education, receiving an MA in 1966 with a thesis on selected changes to the text of the Book of Mormon, while also teaching religion classes part-time. After earning his master's degree, Holland became an Institute of Religion teacher in Hayward, California. He later worked as an institute director in Seattle, Washington. Holland then studied American studies at Yale University, where he received a second MA, and a PhD in 1972. At Yale, Holland studied with American literary scholar and critic R. W. B. Lewis and authored a dissertation on the religious sense of Mark Twain. He was an instructor at the church's institute in Hartford, Connecticut while a student at Yale.

While studying at Yale, Holland served as a counselor in the presidency of the church's Hartford Connecticut Stake.

== Leadership at BYU and CES ==
Holland served as an institute director in Salt Lake City after earning his PhD. He also served as the LDS Church's director of the Melchizedek Priesthood MIA and as chair of its Young Adult Committee. In 1974, at age 33, Holland was appointed BYU's Dean of Religious Education. As dean, he founded BYU's Religious Studies Center and became its first director. From 1976 to 1980, he was the eleventh commissioner of CES, replacing Neal A. Maxwell, who was called to the First Council of the Seventy. During this time, Holland also served on the board of directors of both LDS Hospital and the Polynesian Cultural Center.

In 1980, Holland was appointed to succeed Dallin H. Oaks as BYU's president. After a search committee was formed, as a favorite candidate of N. Eldon Tanner, first counselor in the church's First Presidency, and the protégé of the chair of the executive committee of the BYU Board of Trustees, Gordon B. Hinckley, Holland was appointed less than two days later. As the church's commissioner of education at the time Oaks was released, Holland was supposed to compile a list of candidates to be the next BYU president. Instead, he was unexpectedly notified of the First Presidency's intention to make him president. After his appointment, rumors on campus cited the decision as "politically motivated". Before he arrived at BYU, Holland reduced the number of vice presidents to four and increased the number of assistant and associate vice presidents over academics.

Holland easily transitioned into the role of president. He was familiar with the president's duties, since he had worked closely with Oaks as the commissioner of education. He placed emphasis on upgrading programs and improving relationships with faculty rather than focusing on physical expansion of the campus. In order to supplement the school's funds, Holland launched a fundraiser called "Excellence in the Eighties" which sought to raise $100 million from 1982 to 1987. Specific funds were raised for student scholarships, academic programs, faculty salaries, and extension programs. He emphasized hiring more qualified faculty and purchasing more library and research materials. He supervised the building of the Crabtree Technology Building but did not promise more than ten new buildings during his presidency.

A significant achievement during Holland's presidency was the founding of the BYU Jerusalem Center. Also during his presidency, the BYU Center for International Studies was renamed the David M. Kennedy Center for International Studies and had its role at BYU re-emphasized. There had been a large amount of debate about BYU's dress code throughout the previous administration. Holland clarified his support for dress code rules. Holland also instituted a policy requiring that students seeking to remove their name from records of the LDS Church must receive special permission from the board of trustees in order to remain enrolled in school.

During Holland's presidency, the weekly independent student newspaper The 7th East Press was shut down due to writing about controversial topics. However, student editor, Dean Huffaker, believed that Holland had tried to prevent them from being banned because Holland was conscious of public relations and didn't want to cause controversy. The students stated that they believed the ban came from one of the church's general authorities.

Holland had the re-establishment of religious instruction as the "hub" of BYU's academics as one of his significant administrative goals. While he did not initiate any significant changes along these lines, his public communications regularly emphasized the importance of religious education. As BYU's president, Holland encouraged academic excellence in an atmosphere of faith. Holland emphasized that BYU could not do everything but would seek excellence in what it did choose to do.

Holland served as the president of the American Association of Presidents of Independent Colleges and Universities and as a member of the NCAA's presidents' committee. He also received the "Torch of Liberty" award from the Anti-Defamation League.

== LDS Church service ==
Prior to his call as a general authority, Holland served as bishop of a single adult ward in Seattle, as a counselor in the presidency of the Hartford Connecticut Stake, and as a regional representative. He also served in the presidency of two other stakes and as a stake high councilor.

Holland was called as a general authority and member of the First Quorum of the Seventy on April 1, 1989, bringing an end to his term as BYU's president. As a member of the Seventy, Holland was a counselor in the general presidency of the church's Young Men organization from 1989 to 1990.

From 1990 to 1993, Holland and his wife lived in Solihull, England, where he served as president of the church's Europe North Area.

On June 23, 1994, Holland was called and ordained as an apostle by new church president Howard W. Hunter. The vacancy was created by the death of Ezra Taft Benson and subsequent reorganization of the First Presidency. This timing differed from the typical sustaining of new apostles in a general conference and ordaining them afterward. Holland met with the media on the day of his ordination. His call to the apostleship was subsequently ratified by the church during its October 1994 general conference.

In 2000, Holland became the chair of the Missionary Curriculum Task Force which worked to develop Preach My Gospel. Holland lived in Santiago and served as president of the church's Chile Area from 2002 to 2004.

In the church's general conferences in fall 2007 and spring 2008, Holland gave sermons that directly answered accusations that Latter-day Saints are not Christians. At the April 2009 general conference, Holland gave a sermon about the crucifixion of Jesus Christ and the importance of Christ's saying, "My God, my God, why hast thou forsaken me?" This talk was later reformatted with music and put on a church website where it had been viewed over 500,000 times by August 2009.

In 2012, Holland was the member of the Quorum of the Twelve with responsibility for the affairs of the church in Africa. Early in that year, he went to Sierra Leone, Liberia, and Ghana to meet with members and missionaries. He also met with the vice president of Sierra Leone, Samuel Sam-Sumana. In December 2012, Holland organized the church's 3,000th stake, located in Freetown, Sierra Leone. On March 12, 2012, the Harvard Law School hosted Holland for a "Mormonism 101" series. On June 10, 2015, he addressed the All-Party Parliamentary Group on Foreign Affairs in the House of Lords at the UK Parliament. In 2016, Holland was keynote speaker at the Boy Scouts of America's (BSA) Duty to God breakfast, as part of his assignment as the church's chief BSA representative.

From 2015 to 2023, among his other assignments, Holland served on the Church Board of Education and Boards of Trustees, where he also served as chairman of the Board's Executive Committee from January 2018 to May 2023.

In November 2018, Holland spoke at a major inter-religious conference at Oxford University. During the same trip, Holland met with Theresa May, prime minister of the United Kingdom. This may have been the first official meeting of a church apostle and a British prime minister.

In January 2019, Holland presided at the groundbreaking for the church's Urdaneta Philippines Temple. He also spoke at a multi-stake conference in the Philippines that week. In 2020, as chairman of the executive committee of the BYU-Hawaii board of trustees, he announced the appointment of John S. K. Kauwe III as the institution's new president.

In August 2021, Holland spoke at BYU's annual conference for faculty and staff, which sparked controversy within the LGBTQ+ community. In the address, Holland asked the faculty to defend the doctrine of the LDS Church, BYU's institutional sponsor, to be like the temple builders in Nauvoo, a trowel in one hand, and a musket in the other, to both build and defend, adding that this was not only meant for marriage between a man and a woman, but for broader issues within the church as well. In the speech, on the subject of same sex attraction, he also called for balance between commandment, love, and condoning behavior, stating that it is a "sensitive, demanding balance". Holland said that Christ never once withheld love from anyone, but Christ "also never once said to anyone, 'Because I love you, you are exempt from keeping my commandments'". Holland stated in the same speech that other church leaders, including himself, had shed tears, and with "scar tissue of our own", wanted to avoid language symbols and situations that were divisive, instead to show love for "all of God's children".

In April 2023, the church reported that Holland would take a two-month hiatus from service to focus on his health. He had been undergoing dialysis for a kidney issue and had also contracted COVID-19. In early June, Holland began to gradually return to church service.

After the death of M. Russell Ballard on November 12, 2023, Holland was set apart as the acting president of the Quorum of the Twelve Apostles on November 15, 2023, where he served until the death of church president Russell M. Nelson on September 27, 2025. On October 14, 2025, the First Presidency was reorganized, and Holland was set apart as quorum president by new church president Dallin H. Oaks.

== Personal life and death ==
Holland and his wife, Patricia Terry, were married on June 7, 1963, in the St. George Temple. They were the parents of three children. Their oldest son, Matthew S. Holland, served as president of Utah Valley University from 2009 to 2018 and has been a general authority since April 2020. Their youngest son, David F. Holland, is the John A. Bartlett Professor of New England Church History, and interim dean of Harvard Divinity School. Patricia Holland died on July 20, 2023.

On December 24, 2025, the church announced that he was hospitalized due to "ongoing health complications". Holland died from complications of kidney disease in Salt Lake City on December 27, 2025, at the age of 85. Following his death, Henry B. Eyring became president of the Quorum of the Twelve Apostles, but since he is in the First Presidency, Dieter F. Uchtdorf became the quorum's acting president.

== Works ==
Books

- Holland, Jeffrey R. (2016), To Mothers: Carrying the Torch of Faith and Family, Deseret Book, ISBN 978-1-62972-211-5
- —— (2014), To My Friends: Messages of Counsel and Comfort, Deseret Book, ISBN 978-1-62972-029-6
- —— (2012), For Times of Trouble: Spiritual Solace from the Psalms, Deseret Book, ISBN 978-1-60907-271-1
- —— (2011), Created for greater things, Deseret Book, ISBN 978-1-60641-940-3, OCLC 671541156
- —— (2008), Broken Things to Mend, Deseret Book, ISBN 978-1-60641-024-0, OCLC 231745598
- —— (2006) [1997], Christ and the New Covenant: The Messianic Message of the Book of Mormon, Deseret Book, ISBN 978-1-59038-613-2, OCLC 163198993
- ——; Tanner, Susan W (2006), Modesty, Makeovers, and the Pursuit of Physical Beauty: What Mothers and Daughters Need to Know, Deseret Book, ISBN 978-1-59038-603-3, OCLC 63692649
- —— (2003), Trusting Jesus, Deseret Book, ISBN 978-1-59038-155-7, OCLC 51389056
- —— (2001), Of Souls, Symbols, and Sacraments, Deseret Book, ISBN 978-1-57345-859-7, OCLC 45446206
- —— (2000), Shepherds Why This Jubilee, Eagle Gate, ISBN 978-1-57345-863-4, OCLC 44468883
- —— (1997), Because She Is A Mother, Deseret Book, ISBN 978-1-57345-374-5
- ——; Holland, Patricia T (1989), On Earth As It Is In Heaven, Deseret Book, ISBN 978-0-87579-186-9, OCLC 20133634
- —— (1985), However Long & Hard the Road, Deseret Book, ISBN 978-0-87747-625-2, OCLC 12161981

Speeches

- —— (January 18, 2022), "A Saint Through the Atonement of Christ the Lord", BYU Devotional, Marriott Center, BYU, Provo, Utah
- —— (August 23, 2021), "The Second Half of the Second Century of Brigham Young University", BYU University Conference, Marriott Center, BYU, Provo, Utah
- —— (April 26, 2018), "Banishing All Shadows", BYU Commencement Address, Marriott Center, BYU, Provo, Utah
- —— (August 16, 2016), "Religion: Bound by Loving Ties", BYU University Conference, Marriott Center, BYU, Provo, Utah
- Holland, Jeffrey R. (January 13, 2009), "Remember Lot's Wife", BYU Devotional, Marriott Center, BYU, Provo, Utah
- —— (September 7, 2008), "Lessons from Liberty Jail", CES Fireside for Young Adults, BYU, Provo, Utah
- ——; Holland, Patricia T (May 4, 2007), "What Time Is This?", BYU Women's Conference (PDF)
- —— (September 12, 2004), "Terror, Triumph, and a Wedding Feast", CES Fireside for Young Adults
- —— (October 28, 2000), "The Miracle of a Mission", Missionary Training Center, Provo, Utah — unofficial transcript Archived July 1, 2013, at the Wayback Machine
- —— (February 15, 2000), "How Do I Love Thee?", BYU Devotional, BYU, Provo, Utah
- —— (March 2, 1999), "Cast Not Away Therefore Your Confidence", BYU Devotional, BYU, Provo, Utah
- —— (December 1, 1998), "Christmas Comfort", Ricks College Devotional, Rexburg, Idaho
- —— (March 2, 1997), "Come Unto Me", CES Fireside for Young Adults
- —— (January 17, 1989), "The Will of the Father in All Things", BYU Devotional, BYU, Provo, Utah

== Awards ==
- Eagle Scout Award by the Boy Scouts of America (1955)
- Distinguished Eagle Scout Award by the National Eagle Scout Association
- Torch of Liberty Award by the Anti-Defamation League of B'nai B'rith
- Washington County Exemplary Manhood Award (July 2013)

== See also ==
- Council on the Disposition of Tithes—Leadership body in The Church of Jesus Christ of Latter-day Saints

The Church of Jesus Christ of Latter-day Saints titles
Preceded by Dallin H. Oaks	President of the Quorum of the Twelve Apostles; October 14, 2025 – December 27, 2025	Succeeded by Henry B. Eyring
Preceded by Robert D. Hales	Quorum of the Twelve Apostles; June 23, 1994 – December 27, 2025	Succeeded by Henry B. Eyring
Academic offices
Preceded by Dallin H. Oaks	President of Brigham Young University; 1980–1989	Succeeded by Rex E. Lee
