= Richard Holland (16th-century MP) =

English politician

Richard Holland (c. 1549–1618), of Denton Hall, Manchester and Heaton Hall, Lancashire, was an English politician.

He was a member (MP) of the parliament of England for Lancashire in 1586.
