= Jack Holland (political scientist) =

British political scientist

- Occupations: British political scientist, Professor of Global Security Challenges, Pro-Dean of Research and Innovation

Academic background
- Education: University of Warwick University of Birmingham Homerton College, University of Cambridge

Academic work
- Discipline: Political Scientist
- Sub-discipline: Critical Security Studies, Critical Terrorism Studies, and discourse analysis
- Institutions: University of Leeds

Jack Holland is a British political scientist and Professor of Global Security Challenges at the University of Leeds, where he also serves as Pro‑Dean for Research and Innovation. His research focuses on International Relations and the foreign policy of the United States, United Kingdom, and Australia. He is known for academic contributions to Critical Security Studies, Critical Terrorism Studies, and discourse analysis.

He has held several senior academic roles at Leeds, including Director of Research and Founding Director of the Centre for Global Security Challenges. He is Editor-in-Chief of The British Journal of Politics and International Relations and is recognised as a leading expert on AUKUS, having provided evidence to the UK House of Commons Foreign Affairs Select Committee. He is also a frequent media commentator, appearing on outlets such as BBC Breakfast, BBC News, and Sky News.

He has authored several books, including Selling War and Peace: Syria and the Anglosphere and Fictional Television and American Politics: From 9/11 to Donald Trump. Selling War and Peace: Syria and the Anglosphere has made a "three-fold" contribution which adds a "novel dimension to our understanding of the construction and operation of international relations". Selling the War on Terror: Foreign Policy Discourses after 9/11 "provides a refreshing and critical deconstruction of the War on Terror narrative and the discourses utilised by the US, British, and Australian governments" and is a book which "scholars of critical terrorism studies should not miss".

== Selected publications ==
- Selling War and Peace: Syria and the Anglosphere, (Cambridge University Press, 2020). doi:10.1017/9781108774314
- Fictional Television and American Politics: From 9/11 to Donald Trump, (Manchester University Press, 2019). ISBN 978-1-5261-3423-3
- Selling the War on Terror: Foreign Policy Discourses after 9/11, (Routledge, 2012) ISBN 978-1-138-79746-8
- 'Enactors of the State: The everyday coproduction of security in the prevention of radicalisation', with Natalie Higham-James, Political Studies, (2024). doi:10.1177/00323217241236074
- 'BrOthers in Arms: France, the Anglosphere and AUKUS', with Eglantine Staunton, International Affairs, 100:2 (2024) 1-19. doi:10.1093/ia/iiae016
- 'Narratology and the Syrian Civil War: Beyond identity binaries, towards narrative power', with Xavier Mathieu, International Studies Quarterly, 67:4 (2023) 1-12. doi:10.1093/isq/sqad078
- 'The discursive hegemony of Trump's Jacksonian populism: Race, class, and gender in constructions and contestations of US national identity, 2016-2018', with Ben Fermor, Politics, 41:1 (2021) 64-79. doi:10.1177/0263395720936867
- 'Before the vote: UK foreign policy discourse on Syria, 2011-2013', with Jason Ralph and Kalina Zhekova, Review of International Studies, 43:5 (2017) 875-97. doi:10.1017/S0260210517000134
