= Jack Holland (footballer, born 1861) =

English footballer

Personal information
- Full name: John Henry Holland
- Date of birth: 1861 Q3
- Place of birth: Bulwell, England
- Date of death: 1898 (aged 36–37)
- Position: Goalkeeper

Senior career*
Years	Team	Apps	(Gls)
1886–1889	Notts County	9	(0)
1889	Nottingham Forest	2	(0)
- * Club domestic league appearances and goals

John Henry Holland (1861–1898) was an English footballer who played in the Football League for Notts County.

== Early career ==
Jack Holland was a Bulwell tramcar conductor who began with Notts County two seasons prior to their entry into the Football League. In both seasons he was virtually an automatic choice in goal, this despite a shaky start that included consecutive defeats of 14–0 against Preston North End and 8–0 against Accrington.

== Season 1888–89 ==
Jack Holland, playing in goal, made his League debut on 15 September 1888 at Anfield, the then home of Everton. Notts County lost to the home team 2–1. Jack Holland was Notts County' oldest player from 15 September 1888, when he made his League debut at Anfield until 29 September 1888 when he was surpassed, in age, by Billy Gunn.

Jack Holland appeared in nine of the 22 League matches played by Notts County in season 1888–89. As a goalkeeper (eight appearances) he played in a Notts County defence that restricted the opposition to one–League–goal–in–a–match twice.

== After Notts County ==
Holland left Notts County in June 1889 and signed for Nottingham Forest. After he left Notts County little is known about what happened to him. He died only nine years after leaving Notts County at the age of 37/38.
