= 1888–89 Notts County F.C. season =

Notts County
1888–89 season
- Football League: 11th (12 Points)
- FA Cup: Round 2
- Top goalscorer: Harry Daft & Bob Jardine (9)
Home colours

The 1888–89 season was Notts County's first season in the Football League which had just been founded. Because of this Notts County became one of the founder members of the Football League. They finished in 11th position level on points with bottom of the table Stoke and were re-elected.

== Final league table ==
Pos	Team	Pld	W	D	L	GF	GA	GAv	Pts	Qualification
8	Everton	22	9	2	11	35	47	0.745	20	
9	Burnley	22	7	3	12	42	62	0.677	17	Re-elected
10	Derby County	22	7	2	13	41	61	0.672	16	Re-elected
11	Notts County	22	5	2	15	40	73	0.548	12	Re-elected
12	Stoke	22	4	4	14	26	51	0.510	12	Re-elected

Source: World Football
Rules for classification: 1) Points; 2) Goal average; 3) Goals scored

== Results ==
Notts County's score comes first

=== Legend ===
Win	Draw	Loss

=== Football League ===
Match	Date	Opponent	Venue	Result	Attendance	Scorers
1	15 September 1888	Everton	A	1–2	7,000	Moore
2	22 September 1888	Stoke	A	0–3	3,000	
3	29 September 1888	Aston Villa	A	1–9	4,000	Coulton (o.g.)
4	6 October 1888	Blackburn Rovers	H	3–3	4,000	Daft, Jardine, Moore
5	13 October 1888	Everton	H	3–1	3,000	Daft, Jardine, Moore
6	20 October 1888	West Bromwich Albion	A	2–4	2,000	Allin (2)
7	27 October 1888	Burnley	H	6–1	4,000	Jardine (5), Daft
8	3 November 1888	Preston North End	H	0–7	4,000	
9	10 November 1888	Accrington	H	3–3	8,000	Daft, Jardine, C Shelton
10	24 November 1888	Stoke	H	0–3	2,000	
11	8 December 1888	Aston Villa	H	2–4	2,000	Jardine, Weightman
12	15 December 1888	Blackburn Rovers	A	2–5	4,000	Brown, Hodder
13	22 December 1888	Derby County	A	2–3	2,500	Daft, Hodder
14	29 December 1888	Burnley	A	0–1	2,000	
15	5 January 1889	Preston North End	A	1–4	4,000	Daft
16	12 January 1889	West Bromwich Albion	H	2–1	2,000	Cursham, Hodder
17	19 January 1889	Wolverhampton Wanderers	H	3–0	2,000	Cursham, E May (2)
18	26 January 1889	Accrington	H	2–1	5,000	Daft, McLellan (o.g.)
19	23 February 1889	Wolverhampton Wanderers	A	1–2	4,000	Jackson
20	5 March 1889	Bolton Wanderers	H	0–4	3,000	
21	9 March 1889	Bolton Wanderers	A	3–7	3,000	Jackson, E May, Unknown
22	16 March 1889	Derby County	H	3–5	5,000	Bailey, Daft, Jackson

=== FA Cup ===
Round	Date	Opponent	Venue	Result	Attendance	Scorers
1QR	6 October 1888	Eckington	H	4–1	2,000	Jackson, Emmitt, Marshall (2)
2QR	27 October 1888	Beeston St. John's	H	4–2	2,000	Harker, HH Brown (2), Marshall
3QR	17 November 1888	Derby Midland	H	2–1	1,500	Daft, Harker
4QR	8 December 1888	Staveley	A	3–1	2,000	Cursham, Daft, Wardle
R1	2 February 1889	Old Brightonians	H	2–0	3,000	C Shelton, Moore
R2	16 February 1889	The Wednesday	A	2–3	3,000	A Shelton, Snook

== Appearances ==
Pos.	Name	League		FA Cup		Total	
Pos.	Name	Apps	Goals	Apps	Goals	Apps	Goals
FW	(England) Thomas Allin	6	2	0	0	6	2
FW	(England) L.F. Bailey	1	1	0	0	1	1
HB	(England) George Brown	19	1	3	0	22	1
FW	(England) H.H. Brown	0	0	2	2	2	2
FW	(England) John Brown	1	0	0	0	1	0
FB	(England) John Clements	12	0	3	0	15	0
FB	(England) Henry Cursham	8	2	2	1	10	3
FW	(England) Harry Daft	19	8	4	1	23	9
HB	(England) Charles Dobson	1	0	0	0	1	0
HB	(England) Herbert Emmitt	4	0	3	1	7	1
FW	(England) Galbraith	1	0	0	0	1	0
FW	(England) William Gunn	1	0	0	0	1	0
FB	(England) Frank Guttridge	17	0	1	0	18	0
FW	(England) Ted Harker	2	0	3	2	5	2
FW	(England) Bill Hodder	20	3	2	0	22	3
GK	(England) Jack Holland	9	0	1	0	10	0
FW	(England) Harry Jackson	5	3	3	1	8	4
FW	(Scotland) Bob Jardine	18	9	0	0	18	9
FW	(England) J.T. Marshall	0	0	2	3	2	3
HB	(England) Billy May	4	0	0	0	4	0
FW	(England) Edward May	11	3	3	0	14	3
FB	(Scotland) Tom McLean	12	0	2	0	14	0
FW	(England) Albert Moore	10	3	3	1	13	4
FB	(England) Haydn Morley	2	0	0	0	2	0
GK	(England) Hugh Owen	1	0	0	0	1	0
FW	(England) Albert Shaw	2	0	0	0	2	0
HB	(England) Alf Shelton	21	0	4	1	25	1
HB	(England) Charlie Shelton	15	1	3	1	18	2
GK	(England) Mordecai Sherwin	1	0	4	0	5	0
FB	(England) Herbert Snook	1	0	5	1	6	1
FW	(England) H. Stevens	0	0	1	0	1	0
HB	(England) Ben Warburton	2	0	2	0	4	0
HB	(England) Edwin Wardle	2	0	2	1	4	1
FW	(England) Fred Weightman	1	1	0	0	1	1
GK	(England) Tom Widdowson	12	0	2	0	14	0

== See also ==
- 1888–89 in English football
- List of Notts County F.C. seasons
