= 1889–90 Notts County F.C. season =

Notts County
1889-90 season
- Football League: 10th (17 points)
- FA Cup: 3rd round
Home colours

The 1889-90 Notts County F.C. season was the 2nd season where the club played in the football league. They finished 10th in the league on 17 points and reached the FA cup 3rd round. Notts County ended up re-electing for the football league.

== Final league table ==
Pos	Team	Pld	W	D	L	GF	GA	GAv	Pts
9	Bolton Wanderers	22	9	1	12	54	65	0.831	28
10	Notts County	22	6	5	11	43	51	0.843	23
11	Burnley	22	4	5	13	36	65	0.554	17
12	Stoke (R)	22	3	4	15	27	69	0.391	13

Updated to match(es) played on unknown. Source: world football
(R) Relegated

== Results ==
Notts County's score comes first

=== Football League ===
Match	Date	Opponent	Home/Away	Result	Attendance
1	7 September 1889	Wolverhampton Wanderers	A	0–2	4,000
2	14 September 1889	Aston Villa	A	1–1	4,500
3	21 September 1889	West Bromwich Albion	H	1–2	4,000
4	28 September 1889	Derby County	A	0–2	2,500
5	5 October 1889	Stoke	H	3–1	3,500
6	12 October 1889	Accrington	A	8–1	3,000
7	19 October 1889	Everton	H	4–3	6,000
8	26 October 1889	Bolton Wanderers	A	4–0	3,500
9	2 November 1889	Burnley	H	1–1	4,000
10	9 November 1889	Aston Villa	H	1–1	5,500
11	16 November 1889	Blackburn Rovers	A	1–9	5,000
12	7 December 1889	Everton	A	3–5	8,000
13	14 December 1889	Wolverhampton Wanderers	H	0–2	2,000
14	21 December 1889	Derby County	H	3–1	1,500
15	4 January 1890	West Bromwich Albion	A	2–4	4,200
16	11 January 1890	Bolton Wanderers	H	3–5	2,000
17	18 February 1890	Blackburn Rovers	H	1–1	2,500
18	1 March 1890	Preston North End	A	3–4	7,000
19	13 March 1890	Accrington	H	3–1	4,000
20	15 March 1890	Burnley	A	0–3	4,000
21	24 March 1890	Stoke	A	1–1	3,000
22	27 March 1890	Preston North End	H	0–1	3,000

=== FA Cup ===
Round	Date	Opponent	Home/Away	Result	Attendance	Note
R1	18 January 1890	Birmingham St George's	A	4–4	7,000	
R1R	25 January 1890	Birmingham St George's	H	6–2	6,000	
R2	1 February 1890	Aston Villa	H	4–1	12,000	
QF	15 February 1890	The Wednesday	A	0–5	6,500	Match voided due to weather
QF	22 February 1890	The Wednesday	A	3–2	14,000	Match voided due to player eligibility protest
QF	3 March 1890	The Wednesday	N	1–2	9,000	Played at neutral venue

== Appearances ==
Pos.	Name	League		FA Cup		Total	
Pos.	Name	Apps	Goals	Apps	Goals	Apps	Goals
GK	(England) Tom Widdowson	14	0	4	0	18	0
GK	(England) Jack Holland	8	0	0	0	8	0
FB	(England) John Clements	21	0	4	0	25	0
FB	(England) Frank Guttridge	18	0	4	0	22	0
FB	(England) Henry Cursham	5	0	0	0	5	0
HB	(England) Alf Shelton	22	0	4	0	26	0
HB	(England) Charlie Shelton	20	0	4	2	24	2
HB	(England) George Brown	15	0	0	0	15	0
HB	(England) David Calderhead	7	0	4	0	11	0
FW	(England) Harry Daft	22	12	4	4	26	16
FW	(England) Arthur Locker	22	11	4	4	26	15
FW	(Scotland) Jimmy Oswald	21	11	4	4	25	15
FW	(England) Albert Moore	20	4	4	2	24	6
FW	(England) Bill Hodder	11	0	0	0	11	0
FW	(England) Harry Jackson	6	0	0	0	6	0
FW	(England) James Logan	2	0	0	0	2	0
FW	(England) Fred Weightman	1	0	0	0	1	0
FW	(England) T. Ward	1	0	0	0	1	0
