= List of Notts County F.C. seasons =

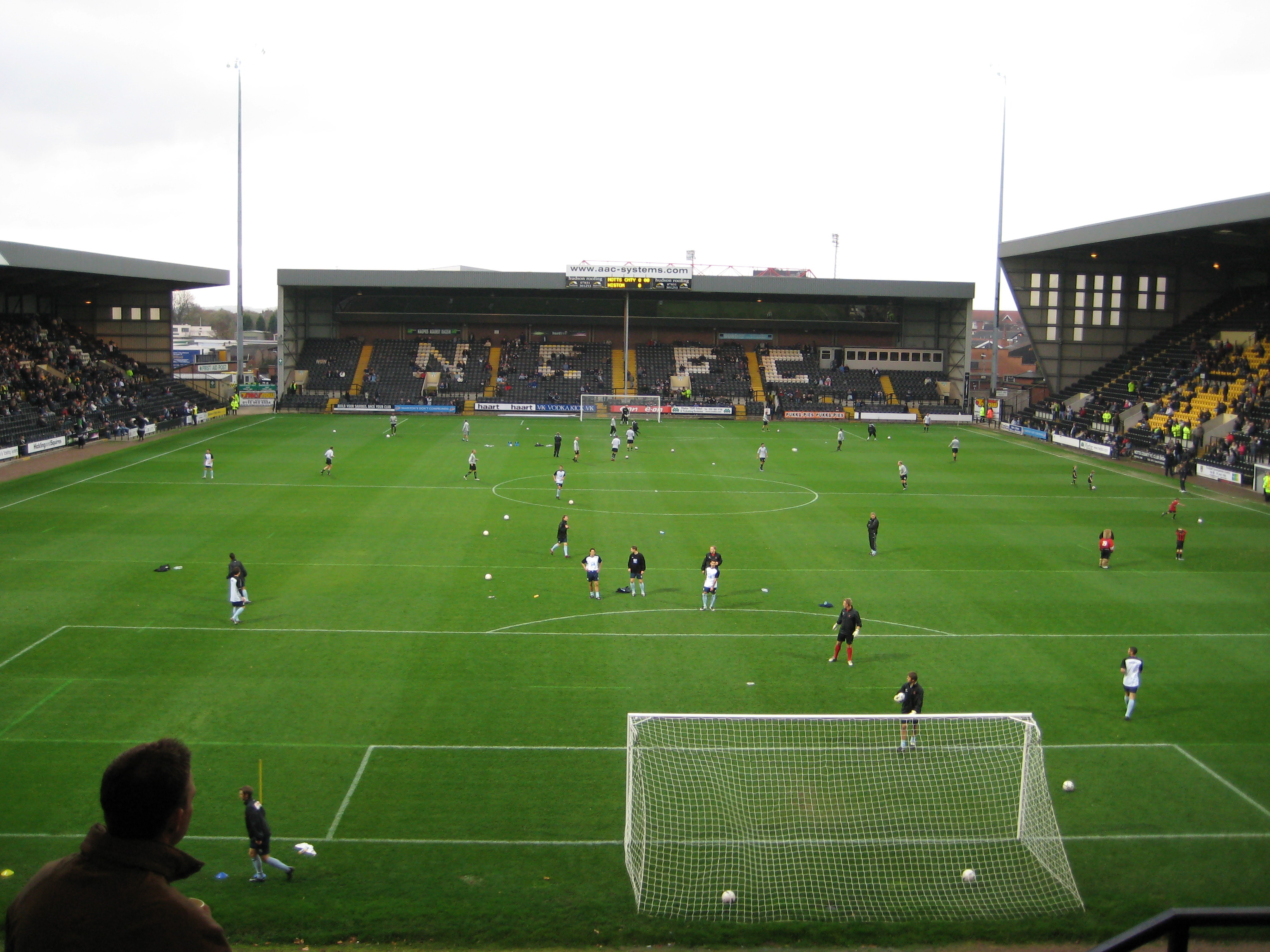
Meadow Lane has been the home of Notts County since the 1910–11 season.

The list of seasons in the history of Notts County Football Club includes all seasons played by the club from 1877–78 until the present day. The list details the club's achievements in all national and European first team competitions, and records their top goalscorer, for each completed season.

== Seasons ==
Season	League										FA Cup	EFL Cup	Other		Top goalscorer	
Season	Division	Lvl	P	W	D	L	F	A	Pts	Pos	FA Cup	EFL Cup	Other		Name	Goals
1877–78											R1				CL Cursham	1
1878–79											R1				Owen	1
1879–80											R1					0
1880–81											R3				Harry Cursham	4
1881–82											R3				Harry Cursham	8
1882–83											SF				Harry Cursham	8
1883–84											SF				Harry Cursham	7
1884–85											QF				William Gunn; Harry Jackson	4
1885–86											R5				Harry Cursham	8
1886–87											QF				Harry Cursham	10
1887–88											R3				Harry Daft; Albert Moore	3
1888–89	FL (Note: Notts County were one of the 12 founding members of The Football League.)	1	22	5	2	15	40	73	12	11th	R2				Bob Jardine	9
1889–90	FL	1	22	6	5	11	43	51	17	10th	QF				Jimmy Oswald	16
1890–91	FL	1	22	11	4	7	52	35	26	3rd (Note: Highest League finish.)	RU				Jimmy Oswald	20
1891–92	FL	1	26	11	4	11	55	51	26	8th	R1				Jimmy Oswald	15
1892–93	Div 1 (Note: The Football League expanded to two divisions in 1892, absorbing most of the teams from the Football Alliance. The league previously known simply as The Football League became the Football League First Division.) ↓	1	30	10	4	16	53	61	24	14th	R2				Jimmy Oswald	14
1893–94	Div 2	2	28	18	3	7	70	31	39	3rd (Note: Failed to gain promotion after test matches.)	W				James Logan	27
1894–95	Div 2	2	30	17	5	8	75	45	39	2nd	R1				Elijah Allsopp	17
1895–96	Div 2	2	30	12	2	16	57	54	26	10th	R1				Walter Bull	18
1896–97	Div 2 ↑	2	30	19	4	7	92	43	42	1st (Note: Promoted after test matches.)	R2				Tom Boucher	24
1897–98	Div 1	1	30	8	8	14	36	46	24	13th	R1				Tom Boucher	7
1898–99	Div 1	1	34	12	13	9	47	51	37	5th	R2				Alex Maconnachie	12
1899–1900	Div 1	1	34	9	11	14	46	60	29	15th	R2				Joe McMain	15
1900–01	Div 1	1	34	18	4	12	54	46	40	3rd	R2				Jack Morris	19
1901–02	Div 1	1	34	14	4	16	51	57	32	13th	R1				Percy Humphreys	14
1902–03	Div 1	1	34	12	7	15	41	49	31	15th	QF				Arthur Green; Percy Humphreys	16
1903–04	Div 1	1	34	12	5	17	37	61	29	13th	R1				Arthur Green	20
1904–05	Div 1	1	34	5	8	21	36	69	18	18th	R1				Jerry Dean; Arthur Green	8
1905–06	Div 1	1	38	11	12	15	55	71	34	16th	R1				Arthur Green; Walter Tarplin	13
1906–07	Div 1	1	38	8	15	15	46	50	31	18th	QF				Percy Humphreys	16
1907–08	Div 1	1	38	13	8	17	39	51	34	18th	R2				Fred Jones	8
1908–09	Div 1	1	38	14	8	16	51	48	36	15th	R1				Jimmy Cantrell	18
1909–10	Div 1	1	38	15	10	13	67	59	40	9th	R1				Jimmy Cantrell	22
1910–11	Div 1	1	38	14	10	14	37	45	38	11th	R1				Jimmy Cantrell	13
1911–12	Div 1	1	38	14	7	17	46	63	35	16th	R2				Sam Richards	14
1912–13	Div 1 ↓	1	38	7	9	22	28	56	23	19th	R1				Jack Peart	7
1913–14	Div 2 ↑	2	38	23	7	8	77	36	53	1st	R1				Jack Peart	29
1914–15	Div 1	1	38	9	13	16	41	57	31	16th	R1				Jack Peart	11
The Football League and FA Cup were suspended until after the First World War.
1919–20	Div 1 ↓	1	42	12	12	18	56	74	36	21st	R3				Harold Hill	13
1920–21	Div 2	2	42	18	11	13	55	40	47	6th	R2				Harold Hill; Sammy Stevens	11
1921–22	Div 2	2	42	12	15	15	47	51	39	13th	SF				Harold Hill	11
1922–23	Div 2 ↑	2	42	23	7	12	46	34	53	1st	R1				Donald Cock	13
1923–24	Div 1	1	42	14	14	14	44	49	42	10th	R2				Donald Cock	11
1924–25	Div 1	1	42	16	13	13	42	31	45	9th	R3				Arthur Davis	13
1925–26	Div 1 ↓	1	42	13	7	22	54	74	33	22nd	R5				Arthur Davis	14
1926–27	Div 2	2	42	15	5	22	70	96	35	16th	R3				Arthur Davis; Neil Harris	16
1927–28	Div 2	2	42	13	12	17	68	74	38	15th	R3				Paddy Mills	21
1928–29	Div 2	2	42	19	9	14	78	65	47	5th	R3				Harold Andrews	21
1929–30	Div 2 ↓	2	42	9	15	18	54	70	33	22nd	R3				Harold Andrews	17
1930–31	Div 3S ↑	3	42	24	11	7	97	46	59	1st	R4				Tom Keetley	41
1931–32	Div 2	2	42	13	12	17	75	75	38	16th	R3				Tom Keetley	30
1932–33	Div 2	2	42	15	10	17	67	78	40	15th	R3				Tom Keetley	15
1933–34	Div 2	2	42	12	11	19	53	62	35	18th	R3				Charlie MacCartney	15
1934–35	Div 2 ↓	2	42	9	7	26	46	97	25	22nd	R3				Fred Shaw	12
1935–36	Div 3S	3	42	15	12	15	60	57	42	9th	R3		Third Division South Cup	R2	Tex Rickards	11
1936–37	Div 3S	3	42	23	10	9	74	52	56	2nd	R1		Third Division South Cup	SF	Hughie Gallacher	25
1937–38	Div 3S	3	42	16	9	17	50	50	41	11th	R4		Third Division South Cup	SF	Willie Chalmers	9
1938–39	Div 3S	3	42	17	9	16	59	54	43	11th	R4		Third Division South Cup	R1	Boy Martin	16
1939–40 (Note: The 1939–40 season was abandoned in early September and all results annulled. Notts County's record is shown as of the time of the annulment.)	Div 3S	3	2	2	0	0	6	3	4	—	—				Boy Martin	3
The Football League and FA Cup were suspended until after the Second World War.
1945–46	n/a (Note: The FA Cup was contested in 1945–46 but the Football League did not resume until the following season.)										R2				Ian McPherson	3
1946–47	Div 3S	3	42	15	10	17	63	63	40	12th	R3				Jackie Sewell	22
1947–48	Div 3S	3	42	19	8	15	68	59	46	6th	R4				Tommy Lawton	24
1948–49	Div 3S	3	42	19	5	18	102	68	43	11th	R4				Jackie Sewell	27
1949–50	Div 3S ↑	3	42	25	8	9	95	50	51	1st	R3				Tommy Lawton	33
1950–51	Div 2	2	42	13	13	16	61	60	39	17th	R3				Tom Johnston; Jackie Sewell	14
1951–52	Div 2	2	42	16	7	19	71	68	39	15th	R4				Frank Broome; Bobby Crookes	15
1952–53	Div 2	2	42	14	8	20	60	88	36	19th	R4				Ken McPherson	14
1953–54	Div 2	2	42	13	13	16	54	74	39	14th	R3				Tom Johnston	16
1954–55	Div 2	2	42	21	6	15	74	71	48	7th	QF				Jimmy Jackson	18
1955–56	Div 2	2	42	11	9	22	55	82	31	20th	R3				Jimmy Jackson	8
1956–57	Div 2	2	42	9	12	21	58	86	30	20th	R3				Gordon Wills	19
1957–58	Div 2 ↓	2	42	12	6	24	44	80	30	21st	R4				Jackie Lane	11
1958–59	Div 3 ↓	3	46	8	13	25	55	96	29	23rd	R1				Don Roby	13
1959–60	Div 4 ↑	4	46	26	8	12	107	69	60	2nd	R2				Stan Newsham	23
1960–61	Div 3	3	46	21	9	16	82	77	51	5th	R1	R2			Tony Hateley	27
1961–62	Div 3	3	46	17	9	20	67	74	43	13th	R3	R1			Tony Hateley	21
1962–63	Div 3	3	46	19	13	14	73	74	51	7th	R1	R4			Tony Hateley	22
1963–64	Div 3 ↓	3	46	9	9	28	45	92	27	24th	R2	QF			Jeff Astle	14
1964–65	Div 4	4	46	15	14	17	61	73	44	13th	R2	R3			Jimmy Rayner	14
1965–66	Div 4	4	46	19	12	15	61	53	50	8th	R1	R1			Ron Still	13
1966–67	Div 4	4	46	13	11	22	53	72	37	20th	R1	R1			Stan Marshall	13
1967–68	Div 4	4	46	15	11	20	53	79	41	17th	R1	R1			Les Bradd	10
1968–69	Div 4	4	46	12	18	16	48	57	42	19th	R1	R1			Don Masson	13
1969–70	Div 4	4	46	22	8	16	73	62	52	7th	R1	R1			Don Masson	23
1970–71	Div 4 ↑	4	46	30	9	7	89	36	69	1st	R3	R1			Tony Hateley	23
1971–72	Div 3	3	46	25	12	9	74	44	62	4th	R4	R2			Les Bradd	25
1972–73	Div 3 ↑	3	46	23	11	12	67	47	57	2nd	R3	QF	Watney Cup	R1	Kevin Randall	23
1973–74	Div 2	2	42	15	13	14	55	60	43	10th	R3	R1			Kevin Randall	14
1974–75	Div 2	2	42	12	16	14	49	59	40	14th	R4	R2			Ian Scanlon	14
1975–76	Div 2	2	42	19	11	12	60	41	49	5th	R3	QF			Les Bradd	19
1976–77	Div 2	2	42	19	10	13	65	60	48	8th	R3	R3	Anglo-Scottish Cup	GS	Mick Vinter	13
1977–78	Div 2	2	42	11	16	15	54	62	38	15th	R5	R3	Anglo-Scottish Cup	SF	Mick Vinter	24
1978–79	Div 2	2	42	14	16	12	48	60	44	6th	R4	R2	Anglo-Scottish Cup	GS	Mick Vinter	14
1979–80	Div 2	2	42	11	15	16	51	52	37	17th	R3	R3	Anglo-Scottish Cup	GS	Ray O'Brien	11
1980–81	Div 2	2	42	18	17	7	49	38	53	2nd	R4	R4	Anglo-Scottish Cup	RU	Trevor Christie	21
1981–82	Div 1	1	42	13	8	21	61	69	47 (Note: The 1981–82 season saw the introduction of three points for a win.)	15th	R3	R2	Football League Group Cup	GS	Iain McCulloch	16
1982–83	Div 1	1	42	15	7	20	55	71	52	15th	R4	R4			Iain McCulloch	12
1983–84	Div 1 ↓	1	42	10	11	21	50	72	41	21st	QF	R3			Trevor Christie	25
1984–85	Div 2 ↓	2	42	10	7	25	45	73	37	20th	R3	R4			Rachid Harkouk	20
1985–86	Div 3	3	46	19	14	13	71	60	71	8th	R4	R2	Associate Members' Cup	GS	Ian McParland	20
1986–87	Div 3	3	46	21	13	12	77	56	76	7th	R2	R1	Associate Members' Cup	GS	Ian McParland	27
1987–88	Div 3	3	46	23	12	11	82	49	81	4th	R2	R1	Associate Members' Cup	RU	Ian McParland	22
1988–89	Div 3	3	46	18	13	15	64	54	67	9th	R2	R2	Associate Members' Cup	R1S	Ian McParland	9
1989–90	Div 3 ↑	3	46	25	12	9	73	53	87	3rd	R1	R1	Associate Members' Cup	RU	Tommy Johnson	18
1990–91	Div 2 ↑	2	46	23	11	12	76	55	80	4th	QF	R2	Full Members' Cup	R2N	Tommy Johnson	19
1991–92	Div 1 ↓	1	42	10	10	22	40	62	40	21st	R5	R2	Full Members' Cup	NSF	Tommy Johnson	12
1992–93	Div 1 (Note: With the advent of the Premier League, the second tier of English football became known as the First Division.)	2	46	12	16	18	55	70	52	17th	R3	R3	Anglo-Italian Cup	GS	Mark Draper	12
1993–94	Div 1	2	46	20	8	18	65	69	68	7th	R4	R2	Anglo-Italian Cup	RU	Gary McSwegan	16
1994–95	Div 1 ↓	2	46	9	13	24	45	66	40	24th	R3	R4	Anglo-Italian Cup	W	Paul Devlin	10
1995–96	Div 2	3	46	21	15	10	63	39	78	4th	R3	R2	Associate Members' Cup	QFN	Devon White	14
1996–97	Div 2 ↓	3	46	7	14	25	33	59	35	24th	R3	R1	Associate Members' Cup	R2N	Gary Martindale	7
1997–98	Div 3 ↑	4	46	29	12	5	82	43	99	1st	R2	R2	Associate Members' Cup	R2N	Gary Jones	28
1998–99	Div 2	3	46	14	12	20	52	61	54	16th	R3	R1	Associate Members' Cup	R1N	Gary Jones	8
1999–2000	Div 2	3	46	18	11	17	61	55	65	8th	R1	R2	Associate Members' Cup	R1N	Mark Stallard	14
2000–01	Div 2	3	46	19	12	15	62	66	69	8th	R3	R2	Football League Trophy	R1N	Mark Stallard	24
2001–02	Div 2	3	46	13	11	22	59	71	50	19th	R2	R2	Football League Trophy	QFN	Daniel Allsopp	28
2002–03	Div 2	3	46	13	16	17	62	70	55	15th	R1	R1	Football League Trophy	R1N	Mark Stallard	25
2003–04	Div 2 ↓	3	46	10	12	24	50	78	42	23rd	R3	R3	Football League Trophy	R1N	Paul Heffernan	21
2004–05	Lge 2 (Note: In 2004–05 the fourth tier of English football was renamed from the Football League Third Division to Football League Two as part of a re-branding exercise by The Football League.)	4	46	13	13	20	46	62	52	19th	R3	R2	Football League Trophy	R1N	Glynn Hurst	15
2005–06	Lge 2	4	46	12	16	18	48	63	52	21st	R2	R1	Football League Trophy	R1S	Glynn Hurst	9
2006–07	Lge 2	4	46	16	14	16	55	53	62	13th	R1	R4	Football League Trophy	R1S	Jason Lee	16
2007–08	Lge 2	4	46	10	18	18	37	53	48	21st	R2	R1	Football League Trophy	R1S	Richard Butcher	12
2008–09	Lge 2	4	46	11	14	21	49	69	47	19th	R2	R2	Football League Trophy	R1N	Delroy Facey	9
2009–10	Lge 2 ↑	4	46	27	12	7	96	31	93	1st	R5	R1	Football League Trophy	R2N	Lee Hughes	30
2010–11	Lge 1	3	46	14	8	24	46	60	50	19th	R4	R3	Football League Trophy	R1N	Lee Hughes	13
2011–12	Lge 1	3	46	21	10	15	75	63	73	7th	R4	R1	Football League Trophy	R2N	Jeff Hughes	13
2012–13	Lge 1	3	46	16	17	13	61	49	65	12th	R2	R1	Football League Trophy	R2N	Jamal Campbell-Ryce	8
2013–14	Lge 1	3	46	15	5	26	64	77	50	20th	R1	R2	Football League Trophy	QFN	Callum McGregor	12
2014–15	Lge 1 ↓	3	46	12	14	20	45	62	50	21st	R1	R1	Football League Trophy	SFN	Garry Thompson	12
2015–16	Lge 2	4	46	14	9	23	54	83	51	17th	R1	R2	Football League Trophy	R2N	Jon Stead	14
2016–17	Lge 2	4	46	16	8	22	54	76	56	16th	R2	R1	EFL Trophy	GS	Jon Stead	14
2017–18	Lge 2	4	46	21	14	11	71	48	77	5th	R4	R1	EFL Trophy	GS	Jorge Grant	18
2018–19	Lge 2 ↓	4	46	9	14	23	48	84	41	23rd	R1	R1	EFL Trophy	R2N	Kane Hemmings	13
2019–20	NL	5	38 (Note: The 2019–20 National League was curtailed due to the COVID-19 pandemic, with league positions, promotions and relegations decided on a points-per-game basis.)	17	12	9	61	38	63	3rd	R2	— (Note: Ineligible to compete after relegation from the EFL.)	FA Trophy	SF	Kyle Wootton	13
2020–21	NL	5	42	20	10	12	62	41	70	5th (Note: Lowest League finish.)	QR4	—	FA Trophy	SF	Kyle Wootton	15
2021–22	NL	5	44	24	10	10	81	52	82	5th	R1	—	FA Trophy	QF	Rúben Rodrigues	20
2022–23	NL ↑	5	46	32	11	3	117	42	107	2nd	QR4	—	FA Trophy	R4	Macaulay Langstaff	42
2023–24	Lge 2	4	46	18	7	21	89	86	61	14th	R2	R1	EFL Trophy	GS	Macaulay Langstaff	29
2024–25	Lge 2	4	46	20	12	14	68	49	72	6th	R2	R1	EFL Trophy	GS	Alassana Jatta	19
2025-26	Lge 2 ↑	4	46	24	8	14	74	52	80	5th	R1	R1	EFL Trophy	GS	Alassana Jatta	16

== Key ==
Key to league record:

- P = Played
- W = Games won
- D = Games drawn
- L = Games lost
- F = Goals for
- A = Goals against
- Pts = Points
- Pos = Final position
- DNE = League did not exist

Key to divisions:

- FL = Football League
- Div 1 = Football League First Division
- Div 2 = Football League Second Division
- Div 3S = Football League Third Division South
- Div 3 = Football League Third Division
- Div 4 = Football League Fourth Division
- Lge 1 = Football League One
- Lge 2 = Football League Two
- NL = National League
- n/a = Not applicable

Key to rounds:

- QR = Qualifying round
- GS = Group stage
- R1 = Round 1
- R2 = Round 2
- R3 = Round 3
- R4 = Round 4
- R5 = Round 5
- QF = Quarter-finals
- SF = Semi-finals
- ASF = Area semi-finals
- AF = Area final
- RU = Runners-up
- WS = Shared
- W = Winners

Champions	Runners-up	Promoted	Relegated	Play-offs (not promoted)

Divisions in bold indicate a change in division.

== Footnotes ==
=== Ups and downs ===
With a total of 15 promotions and 17 relegations, no club has moved between the divisions of the Football League and National League on more occasions than Notts County,

Promotion year – 1897 1914 1923 1931 1950 1960 1971 1973 1981 1990 1991 1998 2010 2023 2026

Relegation year – 1893 1913 1920 1926 1930 1935 1958 1959 1964 1984 1985 1992 1995 1997 2004 2015 2019
