= List of Notts County F.C. records and statistics =

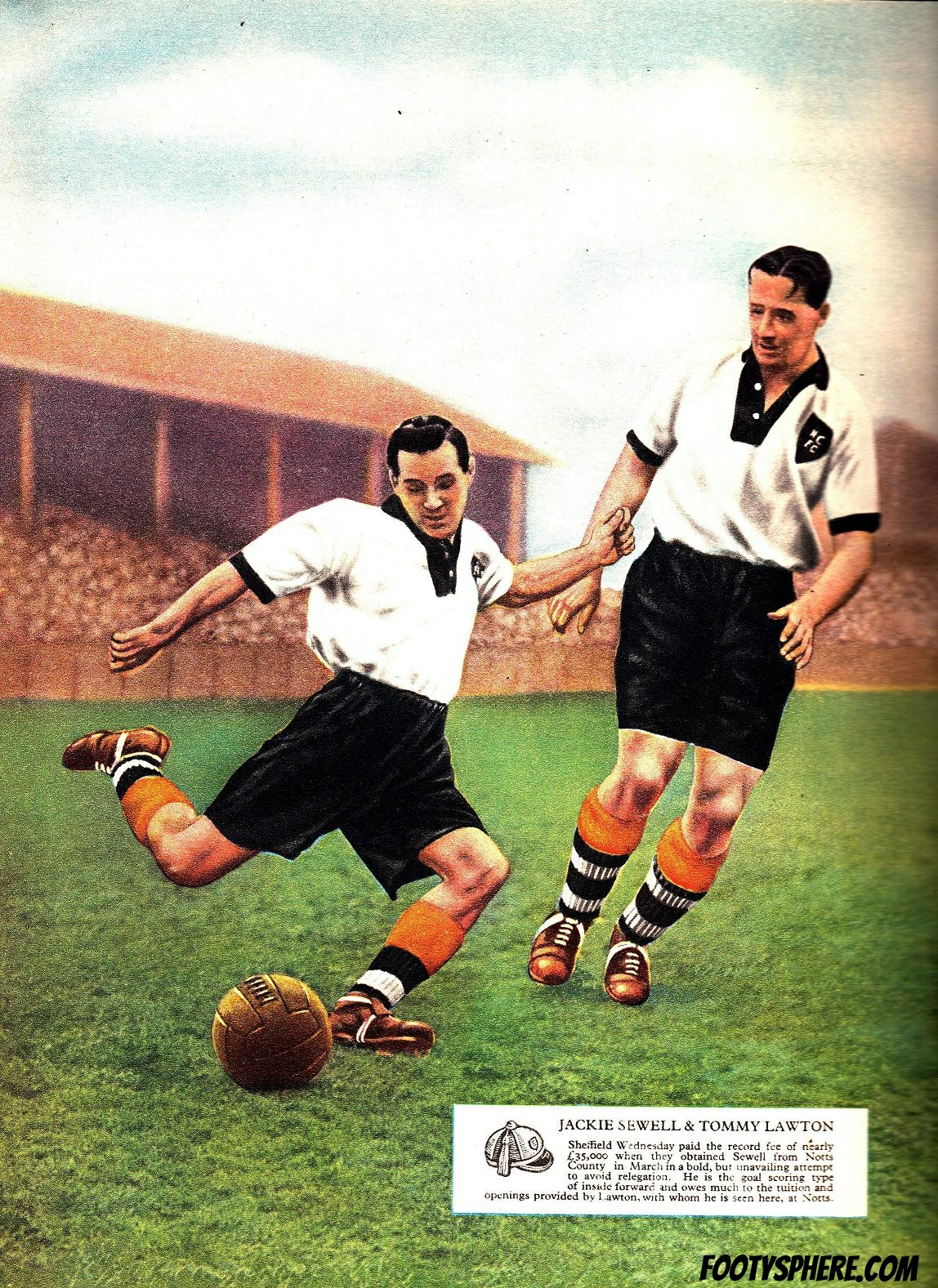
Jackie Sewell (left) and Tommy Lawton, two of Notts County's leading goalscorers

Notts County are an English professional football club based in Nottingham, England, playing in EFL League One, the third tier of the English football league system, as of the 2026–27 season. The club was founded in 1862, and has played its home matches at Meadow Lane since 1910. Notts County first entered the FA Cup in 1877 and in 1888 became one of the 12 founding members of the Football League. Notts County have been promoted 15 times, relegated 17 times and have played in each of the top 5 divisions of English football. The club's highest overall league finish is third; conversely, the team were relegated to non-League football in 2019, where it spent four years.

The record for most games played for the club is held by goalkeeper Albert Iremonger, who made 601 appearances between 1904 and 1926. Les Bradd is the club's record goalscorer, scoring 137 goals during his Notts County career. Kevin Wilson holds the most international caps while a Notts County player, having made 15 appearances for Northern Ireland. The highest transfer fee ever reported to be paid by the club was £750,000 to Sheffield United for Tony Agana in 1991, and the highest fee received is the £2,500,000 paid by Derby County for Craig Short in 1992. The highest attendance recorded at Meadow Lane was 47,310 for the visit of York City in 1955. One of the club's players holds an FA Cup record, with Harry Cursham being the competition's leading goalscorer with 49 goals.

== Honours and achievements ==
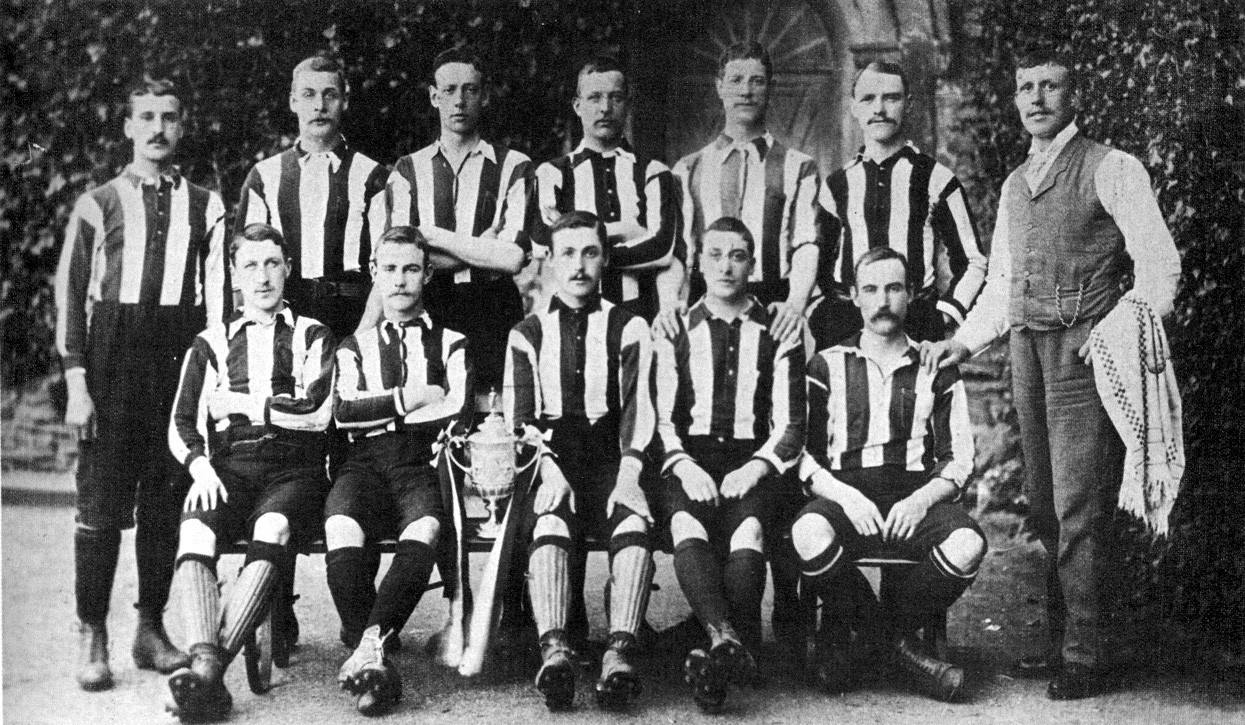
Notts County's FA Cup winning team

Notts County have won two cup competitions in their history; the FA Cup in the 1893–94 season (becoming the first Second Division club to win the FA Cup), and the Anglo-Italian Cup in the 1994–95 season. The club's highest overall league finish is third, achieved in the 1890–91 and 1900–01 seasons. Notts have won eight league titles in total; they have been second tier champions three times, third tier champions twice, and fourth tier champions three times. Their most recent championship was the League Two title won in the 2009–10 season. Notts have won seven other promotions, most recently by beating Salford City 3–0 at Wembley Stadium in the 2026 EFL League Two play-off final.

=== League ===
- Second Division (level 2):
  - Champions (3): 1896–97, 1913–14, 1922–23
  - Promoted (2): 1980–81, (Note: Promoted as runners-up.) 1990–91 (Note: Finished fourth in the Second Division, promoted by beating Brighton & Hove Albion 3–1 in the 1991 Second Division play-off final.)
- Third Division South / Third Division (level 3)
  - Champions (2): 1930–31, 1949–50
  - Promoted (2): 1972–73, (Note: Promoted as runners-up.) 1989–90 (Note: Finished third in the Third Division, promoted by beating Tranmere Rovers 2–0 in the 1990 Third Division play-off final.)
- Fourth Division / Third Division / League Two (level 4)
  - Champions (3): 1970–71, 1997–98, 2009–10
  - Promoted (2): 1959–60, (Note: Promoted as runners-up.) 2025–26 (Note: Finished fifth in League Two, promoted by beating Salford City 3–0 in the 2026 EFL League Two play-off final.)
- National League (level 5)
  - Promoted (1): 2022–23 (Note: Finished second in National League, promoted by beating Chesterfield 4–3 in a penalty shootout after a 2–2 draw in the 2023 National League play-off final.)

=== Cup ===
- FA Cup
  - Winners (1): 1893–94
- Anglo-Italian Cup
  - Winners (1): 1994–95
- League Cup
  - Quarter-finalist (3): 1963–64, 1972–73, 1975–76

== Player records ==
=== Age ===
- Youngest first team player: Kameron Muir, 15 years 32 days (against Burton Albion, 24 September 2024).
- Oldest first team player: Albert Iremonger, 41 years 320 days (against Huddersfield Town, 1 May 1926).

=== Appearances ===
The following are Notts County's leading players by number of appearances.

#	Name	Years	League	FA Cup	League Cup	Other	Total
1	Albert Iremonger	1904–26	564	37	–	–	601
2	Brian Stubbs	1968–80	426	21	24	15	486
3	Pedro Richards	1974–86	399	19	39	28	485
4	David Needham	1965–77	429	17	21	4	471
5	Don Masson	1968–74; 1978–82	402	17	23	13	455
6	Les Bradd	1967–78	395	22	17	8	442
7	Percy Mills	1927–39	407	20	–	–	427
=8	Billy Flint	1909–26	376	32	–	–	408
=8	David Hunt	1977–87	336	22	29	21	408
10	Dean Yates	1987–95	320	20	24	30	394

=== Goalscorers ===
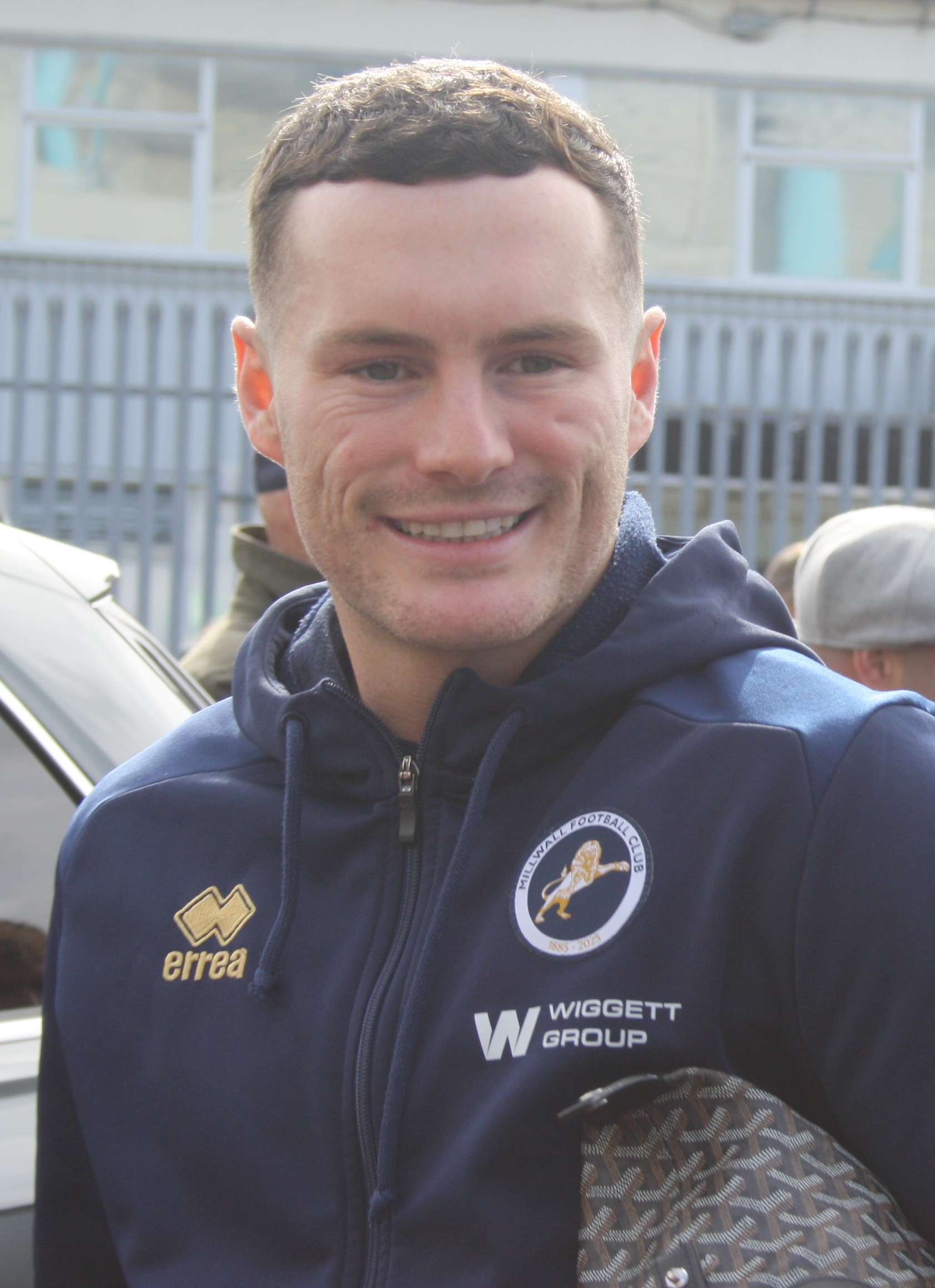
Macaulay Langstaff (pictured in 2026) scored 42 goals for Notts County in the 2022–23 season.

- Most goals in a season: Macaulay Langstaff, 42 goals in the 2022–23 season.
- Most goals in the FA Cup in a season: 10, Harry Cursham, in the 1886–87 season. Cursham is the FA Cup's all-time leading goalscorer, with 49 goals in total.
- Most goals in a competitive match: 6, Harry Cursham (against Wednesbury Strollers, FA Cup, 10 December 1881).
- Most goals in a league match: 5, Bob Jardine (against Burnley, Football League, 27 October 1888); Dan Bruce (against Burslem Port Vale, Second Division, 26 February 1895); Paddy Mills (against Barnsley, Second Division, 19 November 1927).
- Fastest goal: six seconds, Barrie Jones (against Torquay United, Third Division, 31 March 1962). This also stood as the Football League record at the time.
- Fastest hat-trick: two minutes 45 seconds, Ian Scanlon (against Sheffield Wednesday, Second Division, 16 November 1974).

==== Top goalscorers ====
The following are Notts County's leading goalscorers.

#	Name	Years	League	FA Cup	League Cup	Other	Total
1	Les Bradd	1967–78	125	4	7	1	137
2	Tony Hateley	1958–63; 1970–72	109	4	1	–	114
3	Jackie Sewell	1946–51	97	7	–	–	104
4	Tommy Lawton	1947–52	90	13	–	–	103
5	Tom Keetley	1929–33	94	4	–	–	98
6	Don Masson	1968–74; 1978–82	92	3	1	1	97
7	Tom Johnston	1948–57	88	4	–	–	92
8	Ian McParland	1981–89	69	9	5	7	90
9	Harry Daft	1885–95	58	20	–	3	81
=10	Trevor Christie	1979–84	63	3	10	3	79
=10	Gary Lund	1987–95	63	4	5	7	79
=10	Mark Stallard	1999–2004; 2005	69	3	7	–	79

=== International caps ===
- First capped player: Harwood Greenhalgh for England on 30 November 1872
- Most international caps while a Notts County player: Kevin Wilson, 15 for Northern Ireland
- Most England caps while a Notts County player: 8 for Harry Cursham

=== Transfer fees ===
- Record transfer fee paid: £750,000 paid to Sheffield United for Tony Agana in January 1991. The fee paid by Notts to Manchester City for Kasper Schmeichel in August 2009 was reported to exceed this, but the sum was not disclosed.
- Record transfer fee received: £2,500,000 paid by Derby County for Craig Short in September 1992.

== Club records ==
=== Goals ===
- Most league goals scored in a season: 117 in 46 games, National League, 2022–23.
- Fewest league goals scored in a season: 28 in 38 games, First Division, 1912–13.
- Most league goals conceded in a season: 97 in 42 games, Second Division, 1934–35.
- Fewest league goals conceded in a season: 31 in 28 games, Second Division, 1893–94, 31 in 42 games, First Division, 1924–25, and 31 in 46 games, League Two, 2009–10.

=== Points ===
- Most points in a league season:
  - Two points for a win: 69 in 46 games, Fourth Division, 1970–71.
  - Three points for a win: 107 in 46 games, National League, 2022–23. This is a record points tally for a team finishing second in its division.
- Fewest points in a league season:
  - Two points for a win: 12 in 22 games, Football League, 1888–89.
  - Three points for a win: 35 in 46 games, Second Division, 1996–97.

=== Matches ===
==== Firsts ====
- First recorded match: Notts County 0–0 Trent Valley, friendly, 8 December 1864.
- First FA Cup match: Notts County 1–1 Sheffield, 3 November 1877.
- First league match: Everton 2–1 Notts County, 15 September 1888.
- First Football League Cup match: Notts County 1–3 Brighton & Hove Albion, 20 October 1960.

==== Record wins ====
- Record league win: 10–0 against Burslem Port Vale in Second Division, 2 February 1895, and 11–1 against Newport County in Third Division South, 15 January 1949.
- Record FA Cup win: 15–0 against Rotherham Town on 24 October 1885.
- Record Football League Cup win: 6–1 against Bolton Wanderers on 30 October 1984.

==== Record defeats ====
- Record league defeat: 9–1 against Aston Villa in the Football League, 29 September 1888, against Blackburn Rovers in the Football League, 16 November 1889, and against Portsmouth in Second Division, 9 April 1927.
- Record FA Cup defeat: 8–1 against Newcastle United, 8 January 1927.
- Record Football League Cup defeat: 7–1 against Newcastle United, 5 October 1993 and against Manchester City, 19 August 1998.

=== Attendances ===
- Highest home attendance: 47,310 against York City, FA Cup sixth round, 12 March 1955.
- Highest home league attendance: 46,000 against Nottingham Forest, Third Division South, 22 April 1950.
