= Daft =

Daft is an Old English-derived word for silly, stupid, or mad, depending on context.

Daft may also refer to:

- Daft (album), a 1986 album by Art of Noise
- DAFT (treaty), Dutch-American Friendship Treaty, signed in 1956
- D.A.F.T.: A Story About Dogs, Androids, Firemen and Tomatoes, a collection of music videos from Daft Punk's first album Homework
- Daft, an adulterant to bulk up candy; see List of foodborne illness outbreaks by death toll

== People ==
- Charles Daft (1830–1915), English cricketer
- Douglas Daft (born 1943), Australian businessman
- Harry Daft (1866–1945), English footballer
- Kevin Daft (born 1975), American football coach and former professional quarterback
- Richard Daft (1835–1900), English cricketer, brother of Charles Daft
  - Richard Daft (cricketer, born 1863) (1863–1934), son of Richard Daft
- Richard L. Daft (born 1941), American professor of management

== See also ==
- Daft Punk, a French music duo
- Daft Jamie, the nickname of one of Burke and Hare's victims
