= Billy May (footballer) =

English footballer (1865–1936)

Personal information
- Full name: William Owen May
- Date of birth: 26 September 1865
- Place of birth: Hull, England
- Date of death: 13 October 1936 (aged 71)
- Position: Forward

Senior career*
Years	Team	Apps	(Gls)
1885–1886	Long Eaton Rangers		
1886–1888	Notts Rangers		
1888–1889	Notts County	4	(0)
1889–1890	Notts Jardines F.C.		
1890–1893	Burton Swifts		
1893–1894	Mansfield Greenhalgh's		
1894	Mansfield Town F.C.		
1894–1895	Mansfield		
1895–1896	Burton Swifts	1	(0)
1896 – ????	Burton Ivanhoe F.C		
- * Club domestic league appearances and goals

Billy May (26 September 1865 – 13 October 1936) was an English footballer who played in the Football League for Notts County and Burton Swifts.

== Early career ==
Billy May was born in Hull, in, what was then the East Riding of Yorkshire but was from a Nottingham family and at the age of 19 he signed for a Derbyshire football club, Long Eaton Rangers. At the time May was on Long Eaton Rangers books the club were not in a competitive League.

The following year, as May approached his 21st birthday May moved to Nottinghamshire club, Notts Rangers. This was another club who, at that time, were not playing any kind of League football. He then signed for Notts County but there is a dispute as to when. One source quotes 1 July 1887 whereas another states November 1888.

== League & Notts County debut ==
Billy May made his Club & League debut in November 1888. The venue was Trent Bridge, Nottingham. The date was 10 November 1888 and the opposition was Accrington. For a November's day the weather was pleasant and the 8,000 crowd saw some fine attacking football. Accrington forward Billy Barbour put his side ahead but not long after Harry Daft leveled the scores and Mordecai Sherwin entertained the crowd with one of his cartwheels. Accrington then got the better of the play and their forward, Joe Lofthouse, restored Accrington' lead. 2–1 at half-time.

The second-half saw Notts County get the better of the play, Charles Shelton equalizing for County and then Bob Jardine putting County ahead for the first time in the match. As the match wore on County had two defenders injured so it was no surprise when Billy Barbour got his brace and the match finished a draw, 3-3, a point each. Note: This was the only time Billy May played for Notts County in a League match and was not on the losing side.

== 1888-1889 Season ==
Billy May made his debut on 10 November 1888 at centre-forward for Notts County. He played twice in that position between, and including 10 November 1888 to 24 November 1888.

He returned to the first team on 15 December 1888 but had moved to inside-right. The match was played at Leamington Road, Blackburn. The opposition was high-flying Blackburn Rovers and County were well beaten 5–2. The following week he played his second match at inside-right, and his last game for Notts County. The match was at County Ground, Derby and Notts County lost 3–2.

May played four league matches for Notts County and when he played his team scored seven goals (out of 40) and conceded 14 out of 73 goals. The 40 goals was the joint third lowest tally by any League club that season. The 73 goals conceded was the worst by any League club in 1888–1889. Notts County finished 11th and had to seek re-election.

== 1889-1896 ==
After Leaving Notts County May became a journeyman footballer having short stays at a variety of clubs.

In 1889 he stayed in Nottingham but played for, what was probably a works side, Nottingham Jardine's Athletic. Little appears to be recorded about this club and it is uncertain whether they played League football in 1889–1890 when Billy May was there.

In 1890 Billy May left Nottingham and went to Burton-upon-Trent, in the County of Staffordshire to join Burton Swifts who, had just helped to form the League known as The Combination. May stayed at Burton for three years and the club did not finish in the top three in any of those three seasons that Billy May played there.

In 1893, after three uneventful seasons Billy May left Burton Swifts and moved back to Nottinghamshire. This time he went to the town of Mansfield in the heart of the Nottinghamshire coalfield. The team was Mansfield Greenhalgh' a member of the Midland League where Billy May' team finished fifth.

In 1894 Billy May moved across Mansfield and joined Mansfield Town. Before the 1894–1895 season started there was an amalgamation. Mansfield Town with Billy May on their books joined with Mansfield Greenhalgh' to form Mansfield. Mansfield played in the Midland League and Billy May played for them, in that League in 1894–1895.

In 1895 Billy May moved again, back to Staffordshire, back to Burton Swifts who were now members of the Football League Second Division. Billy May was now 30 years old and was very much a reserve player at Burton Swifts. His only chance for League football, his last ever League game was played on 29 February 1896 against Liverpool. The venue was Peel Croft, Burton-upon-Trent and Billy May finished his Football League career having never won a game as Liverpool slaughtered Burton Swifts 7–0.

In 1896 Billy May left Burton Swifts and moved across town to play for Burton Ivanhoe F.C. It is not recorded when Billy May stopped playing and left Burton Ivanhoe.

== End of Career ==
Billy May stayed in Burton and is recorded in the 1901 census as working as a licensed victualler. (off-licence manager). He must have moved back to Nottingham at some time as he died there on 13 October 1936 aged 71.
