= Thomas Cooke (English footballer) =

English footballer

Personal information
- Full name: Thomas Cooke
- Position: Forward

Senior career*
Years	Team	Apps	(Gls)
1887	Notts Rangers		
1888–1889	Notts County	1	(0)
- * Club domestic league appearances and goals

Thomas Cooke was an English footballer who played in The Football League for Notts County.

== Early career ==
All that is known is Thomas Cooke played for Notts Rangers, was signed for the one game he played, and returned to Notts Rangers. Notts Rangers did not play in a League until the 1889-1890 season.

== 1888 ==
Thomas Cooke made his Notts County and Football League debut at Trent Bridge, Nottingham on 8 December 1888. The opponents were high-flying Aston Villa, with only 1,500 in attendance. Cooke played at outside-right. The weather was terrible, heavy rainfall, and Notts County had prioritized a FA Cup tie so the League team was described as a "scratch" side.

Many County players were making their Club or League debuts and some, including Thomas Cooke, never played again after this match. However, one contemporary commentator stated that the new boys, including Thomas Cooke, did well. County goalkeeper Tom Widdowson could do nothing to stop the shot from Albert Brown that put Villa ahead. Widdowson had parried a powerful shot from Villa forward, Archie Hunter, but he couldn't hold the ball which fell to Brown who scored. County played well after going behind and Thomas Cooke powered two shots goal-bound but both struck the goalpost. County got back into the game and scored a deserved equalizer by Bob Jardine. 1-1 at Half-Time.

Villa forward Archie Goodall restored Villa' lead. Goodall latched onto a shot by fellow forward, Tommy Green and swept the ball past Widdowson. County rallied again after falling behind and scored a second equalizer by debut man Fred Weightman. County did have a chance to take the lead and Cooke was well placed to put County ahead. However, he shot wide. After Cooke' miss it was all Villa. Tommy Green restored Villa' lead and Archie Goodall made sure of the two points with his second goal in the match. Full Time score Notts County 2-4 Aston Villa.

Thomas Cooke commenced his Football League career at outside-right on 8 December 1888 at Trent Bridge, Nottingham, (see above for details). Cooke only made the one League appearance.

Cooke played one League match for Notts County and when he played his team scored two goals (out of 40) and conceded four out of 73 goals. The 40 goals scored was the joint third lowest tally by any League club that season. The 73 goals conceded was the worst by any League club in 1888-1889. Notts County finished 11th and had to seek re-election.

== 1889 onwards ==
It is assumed from the limited information that Thomas Cooke returned to Notts Rangers.
