= Tom McLean =

Tom McLean may refer to:

- Tom McLean (Scottish footballer) (1866–1936), Scottish footballer for Derby County and Notts County
- Tom McLean (footballer, born 1931) (1931–2017), Australian footballer for Melbourne and North Melbourne
- Tom McLean (footballer, born 1876) (1876–1948), Australian footballer for Collingwood and Geelong
- Tom McLean (trade unionist) (1877/78–1957), English trade union leader
- Tom McLean (scientist), British chemist
- Thomas MacLean, British musician and multi-instrumentalist

== See also ==
- Tom McClean (born 1942), British Army veteran and survival expert
