= Thomas Cooke =

Thomas, Tommy or Tom Cooke may refer to:

== Arts and entertainment ==
- Thomas Cooke (author) (1703–1756), English translator of the classics
- Thomas Simpson Cooke (1782–1848), Irish composer, singer and theatre musician
- Thomas Taplin Cooke (1782–1866), English showman
- Thomas Cooke (actor) (1786–1864), English actor

== Law and politics ==
- Thomas Cooke (mayor) (died 1478), lord mayor of London
- Sir Thomas Cooke (c. 1648–1709), governor of East India Company and MP for Colchester
- Thomas B. Cooke (1778–1853), United States representative from New York
- Thomas F. Cooke (1863–1941), American banker and Los Angeles City Council member
- Thomas H. Cooke Jr. (1929–2020), American politician, mayor of East Orange, New Jersey

== Sports ==
- Thomas Cooke (English footballer) (fl. 1880s), English footballer for Notts County
- Thomas Cooke (soccer) (1885–1964), American soccer player and Olympian
- Thomas Cooke (footballer, born 1913) (1913–1974), English footballer

== Others ==
- Thomas Cooke (priest) (1599–1669), English priest
- Thomas Cooke (banker) (died 1752), English merchant and banker
- Thomas Cooke (physiognomist) (1763–1818), English physiognomist
- Thomas Cooke (bishop) (1792–1870), Canadian Roman Catholic bishop
- Thomas Cooke (scientific instrument maker) (1807–1868), British telescope maker, founder of T. Cooke & Sons
- Thomas Cooke (British Army officer) (1841–1912), British general
- Thomas Cooke (soldier, born 1881) (1881–1916), Australian recipient of the Victoria Cross

== See also ==
- T. Cooke & Sons, a mathematical instrument company
- Thomas Coke (disambiguation)
- Thomas Cook (disambiguation)
- Sir Thomas Cookes, 2nd Baronet
- Thomas Cook (1808–1892), travel entrepreneur
