= Thomas Coke, 1st Earl of Leicester =

Thomas Coke, 1st Earl of Leicester may refer to:

- Thomas Coke, 1st Earl of Leicester (fifth creation) (1697–1759), English land owner and patron of the arts
- Thomas Coke, 1st Earl of Leicester (seventh creation) (1754–1842), British politician

== See also ==
- Thomas Coke (disambiguation)
