= Arthur Shaw =

Arthur Shaw is the name of:

- Arthur Shaw (athlete) (1886–1955), American athlete
- Arthur Shaw (footballer, born 1924) (1924–2015), English professional footballer
- Arthur Shaw (footballer, born 1869) (1869–1946), English footballer
- Arthur Shaw (trade unionist) (1880–1939), British trade union leader

== See also ==
- Artie Shaw (1910–2004), American clarinetist, composer, and bandleader
- Arthur Shores (1904–1996), American civil rights attorney
