= William Flint =

William Flint may refer to:

- Billy Flint, English footballer
- William Russell Flint, Scottish artist and illustrator
