= Edward May =

Edward May may refer to:

- Sir Edward May, 2nd Baronet (?1751–1814), MP for Belfast
- Teddy May (Edward May, 1865–1941), English footballer
- Eddie May (Scottish footballer) (Edward May, born 1967), Scottish football player and manager
- Edward Ralph May (1819–1852), only delegate to 1850 Indiana Constitutional Convention to vote for African-American suffrage
- Edward Harrison May (1824–1887), English-American painter
- Edward May (poet), poet whose work is included in The Oxford Book of Short Poems (1985)
- E. J. May (1853–1941), English architect
- Edward Collett May (1806–1887), English music educator

== See also ==
- Eddie May (Edwin May, 1943–2012), English footballer
