= Teddy May =

English footballer (1865–1941)

Personal information
- Full name: Edward Henry May
- Date of birth: 26 September 1865
- Place of birth: Hull, England
- Date of death: 6 January 1941 (aged 75)
- Place of death: Sneinton, Nottingham, England
- Position: Left winger

Youth career
- Notts Rangers

Senior career*
Years	Team	Apps	(Gls)
1886–1887	Burslem Port Vale	0	(0)
1887	Notts County	0	(0)
1887–1888	Burslem Port Vale	0	(0)
1888–1890	Notts County	29	(4)
1890–1891	Nottingham Forest		
1891–1893	Burton Swifts	18	(5)
- Greenhalgh's
- Mansfield
- * Club domestic league appearances and goals

Edward Henry May (26 September 1865 – 6 January 1941) was an English footballer who played for Notts Rangers, Burslem Port Vale, Notts County, and Nottingham Forest in the 1880s and 1890s.

== Career ==
May played for Notts Rangers before joining Burslem Port Vale in the summer of 1886. He made his debut at the Athletic Ground in a 7–0 defeat to Preston North End in a friendly on 6 September. He enjoyed regular football, helping the club to the third round of the FA Cup in 1886–87, until March 1887 when he departed for Notts County. He returned to Burslem on business in September 1887. He rejoined the Vale, playing regular football once more until he returned to Nottingham in the summer of 1888. He scored three goals in 11 league games in the Football League in the 1888–89 season, and featured in 18 league games in the 1889–90 campaign. He went on to play in the Football Alliance for Nottingham Forest before he joined Second Division club Burton Swifts in 1892. He scored eight goals in 24 league and cup appearances for the Swifts in the 1892–93 season and later played for Burton Swifts, Greenhalgh's, and Mansfield.

== Career statistics ==
Appearances and goals by club, season and competition
Club	Season	League			FA Cup		Total	
Club	Season	Division	Apps	Goals	Apps	Goals	Apps	Goals
Burslem Port Vale	1886–87	–	0	0	4	1	4	1
Burslem Port Vale	1887–88	–	0	0	1	0	1	0
Burslem Port Vale	Total		0	0	5	1	5	1
Notts County	1888–89	Football League	11	3	3	0	14	3
Notts County	1889–90	Football League	18	1	6	5	24	6
Notts County	Total		29	4	9	5	38	9
Burton Swifts	1892–93	Second Division	18	5	6	3	24	8
