= Butler Parr =

English cricketer (1810–1872)

Butler Parr (9 November 1810 – 16 March 1872) was an English first-class cricketer active 1835–54 who played for Nottingham and Nottinghamshire. He was born in Marton, Lincolnshire and died in Radcliffe-on-Trent. He was a right-handed batsman and occasional wicket-keeper. He also worked as a brewer and maltster. He was the father-in-law of cricketer Richard Daft. who became involved in Parr's brewery business. Parr appeared in 23 first-class matches.

== Bibliography ==
- Haygarth, Arthur (1996) [1862]. Scores & Biographies, Volume 1 (1744–1826). Kennington: Frederick Lillywhite. ISBN 978-19-00592-23-9.
- Haygarth, Arthur (1997) [1862]. Scores & Biographies, Volume 2 (1827–1840). Kennington: Frederick Lillywhite. ISBN 978-19-00592-23-9.
