= Richard Daft (cricketer, born 1863) =

English cricketer

Personal information
- Full name: Richard Parr Daft
- Born: 25 October 1835; Radcliffe-on-Trent, Nottinghamshire, England
- Died: 27 March 1934 (aged 70); South Croydon, Surrey, England
- Batting: Right-handed
- Bowling: Right-arm medium
- Relatives: Richard Daft (father); Harry Daft (brother); Charles Daft (uncle)

Domestic team information
- Years: Team
- 1896: Berkshire
- 1886: Nottinghamshire

Career statistics
Competition	First-class
Matches	1
Runs scored	5
Batting average	5.00
100s/50s	–/–
Top score	5
Balls bowled	–
Wickets	–
Bowling average	–
5 wickets in innings	–
10 wickets in match	–
Best bowling	–
Catches/stumpings	–/–
- Source: Cricinfo, 18 May 2012

Richard Parr Daft (25 October 1863 – 27 March 1934) was an English cricketer. Daft was a right-handed batsman who bowled right-arm medium pace. He was born at Radcliffe-on-Trent, Nottinghamshire.

Daft made a single first-class appearance for Nottinghamshire against Surrey at Trent Bridge in 1886. Surrey won the toss and elected to bat, scoring 282 in their first-innings. In response, Nottinghamshire made 223 all out in their first-innings, with Daft being caught behind by Henry Wood off the bowling of John Beaumont for 5 runs. Surrey reached 100/2 in their second-innings, at which point the match was declared a draw. This was his only major appearance for the county. Ten years later he played for Berkshire in the 1896 Minor Counties Championship, appearing twice against Buckinghamshire and once against Hertfordshire.

He died at South Croydon, Surrey, on 27 March 1934. His father, also called Richard, was a first-class cricketer, as were his brother Harry and uncle Charles.
