= Tom Widdowson =

English footballer (1862–1944)

Personal information
- Full name: Thomas Haslam Widdowson
- Date of birth: Q1 1862
- Place of birth: Hucknall, England
- Date of death: 20 June 1944 (aged 82)
- Place of death: Nottingham, England
- Position: Goalkeeper

Senior career*
Years	Team	Apps	(Gls)
1887–1888	Nottingham Forest		
1888–1890	Notts County	12	(0)
1890–1898	Nottingham Forest		
1898–????	Kimberley Town F.C.		
- * Club domestic league appearances and goals

Thomas Widdowson (1862 – 1944) was an English footballer who played in The Football League for Notts County.

== Early career ==
Tom Widdowson was born in Hucknall, in the County of Nottinghamshire. When Widdowson was born, (between 1 January and 31 March 1862) Hucknall was an industrial centre just to the North of the City of Nottingham. Apparently, Widdowson appeared to be a late developer in football terms as he was not signed by Nottingham Forest until 1887, when he was past his 25th Birthday. When Widdowson was on the books at Nottingham Forest, 1887-1888 the club were not playing in a competitive League but did enter the F.A. Cup. Widdowson was still at Forest at the start of 1888–1889 season but by December 1888 Notts County needed a goalkeeper and so Widdowson, approaching his 27th Birthday signed for a Football League club.

== League & Notts County debut ==
Tom Widdowson made his debut at Trent Bridge, Nottingham on 8 December 1888. The opponents were high-flying Aston Villa, with only 1,500 in attendance. The weather was terrible, heavy rainfall, and Notts County had prioritized a FA Cup tie so the League team was described as a "scratch" side.

Many County players were making their Club or League debuts and some, never played again after this match. However, picked out for praise was Tom Widdowson who was described by contemporary accounts as having a good match. Widdowson could do nothing to stop the shot from Albert Brown that put Villa ahead. Widdowson had parried a powerful shot from Villa forward, Archie Hunter, but he couldn't hold the ball which fell to Brown who scored. County played well after going behind and came back into the game and got a deserved equalizer, scored by Bob Jardine. 1–1 at Half-Time.

Villa forward Archie Goodall restored Villa' lead. Goodall latched onto a shot by fellow forward, Tommy Green and swept the ball past Widdowson. County rallied again after falling behind and scored a second equalizer by debut man Fred Weightman. County did have a chance to take the lead but after County equalized it was all Villa. Tommy Green restored Villa' lead and Archie Goodall made sure of the two points with his second goal in the match. Full Time score Notts County 2-4 Aston Villa.

== 1888-1889 season ==
Tom Widdowson made his debut on 8 December 1888 as goalkeeper for Notts County. He became ever-present from his debut so, from 8 December 1888 until the final game of the season, 16 March 1889 Widdowson played 12 times in goal in League matches and twice in FA Cup ties. He achieved two clean-sheets. In a 3–0 win over high-flying Wolverhampton Wanderers at Trent Bridge on 19 January 1889 and a 2–0 win over Old Brightonians at Trent Bridge on 2 February 1889. The latter match was a FA Cup first-round tie.

Widdowson played 12 league matches for Notts County and when he played his team scored 21 goals (out of 40) and conceded 37 out of 73 goals. The 40 goals was the joint third lowest tally by any League club that season. The 73 goals conceded was the worst by any League club in 1888–1889. Notts County finished 11th and had to seek re-election.

== 1889 onwards ==
Widdowson was retained for the 1889–1890 season by Notts County but he never got to play a first team match. So when he played on 16 March 1889 at Castle Cricket Ground, Nottingham against Derby County that was his last match for Notts County and his last League appearance.

In 1890 he returned to Nottingham Forest. Nottingham Forest played in a League called the Football Alliance which Forest won in 1891–1892. In 1892-1893 Nottingham Forest were elected to the Football League. Widdowson remained on Forest' books until 1898 but he was never called up to play a League match. In 1898 now aged 36, he left Forest and joined Kimberley Town Football Club who competed in the FA Cup. There are no records of when Widdowson retired from football. Widdowson died, aged 82, on 20 June 1944 in Nottingham.
