= Herbert Emmitt =

English cricketer

Personal information
- Full name: Herbert William Emmitt
- Date of birth: 6 August 1857
- Place of birth: Nottingham, England
- Date of death: 1901 (aged 43–44)
- Position: Half-back

Senior career*
Years	Team	Apps	(Gls)
1888–1889	Notts County	4	(0)
- Nottingham Forest
- * Club domestic league appearances and goals

Herbert William Emmitt (6 August 1857 – 1901) was an English footballer who played in The Football League for Notts County. He also played cricket for Nottinghamshire, making two first-class appearances in 1884. He also made a single first-class appearance for the North in 1888.
