= Bill Hodder =

English footballer

Personal information
- Full name: William Hodder
- Date of birth: October 1865
- Place of birth: Stroud, England
- Date of death: March 1897 (aged 31)
- Place of death: Nottingham, England
- Position: Forward

Senior career*
Years	Team	Apps	(Gls)
1887	Notts Rangers		
1888–1889	Notts County	20	(3)
1889	Nottingham Forest		
1889–1890	Kidderminster Olympic		
1890–1891	The Wednesday		
1891–1893	Lincoln City		
1893	Mansfield Town		
- * Club domestic league appearances and goals

William Hodder was an English footballer who played in The Football League for Notts County.

== Early career ==
Bill Hodder was born and grew up in Stroud, Gloucestershire. Bill Hodder signed for Notts Rangers in 1887. Notts Rangers were founded in 1868. Notts Rangers best Cup run occurred in the only season Hodder was there, season 1887–88. Notts County got to the Fourth Round and were defeated on 17 December 1887 away to Darwen 3–1.

== 1888–89 season ==
Bill Hodder signed for Notts County in 1888. Playing as a winger, Bill Hodder made his Notts County & League debut on 8 September 1888 at Anfield, the then home of Everton. Notts County lost to the home team 2–1. NOTE: It is assumed that Hodder had not played for County before the Everton match. There is no record of exactly when in 1888 he left Notts Rangers and signed for Notts County.

Bill Hodder, playing as a winger, scored his debut and only League goal on 15 December 1888 at Leamington Road, the then home of Blackburn Rovers. Notts County lost to the home team 5–2. Bill Hodder scored the first of Notts County' two goals.

Bill Hodder appeared in 20 of the 22 League matches played by Notts County in season 1888–89 and scored three League goals. As a winger (19 appearances ) he played in a Notts County midfield that achieved big (three–League–goals–in–a–match–or–more) wins on two occasions. .

== 1889 onwards ==
The Magpies fielded a total of 33 different players in League matches in season 1888–89, and this is an undemanding programme of only 22 matches. Notts County' 11th-place finish, in a League of 12 clubs, ensured sweeping changes in personnel during the close season, Hodder being among the casualties. So, in September 1889 he went across town to join Nottingham Forest. Nottingham Forest were members of the Football Alliance. It is unclear whether Hodder ever played for Forest as in the same year, 1889, he signed for Kidderminster Olympic. Kidderminster Olympic were in the Birmingham & District League. Kidderminster Olympic and Kidderminster Harriers had a tremendous rivalry and in the 1889–1890 season Olympic won the title and Harriers were runners-up. It can only be assumed that Hodder was part of the League Championship title winning team. Hodder was at Kidderminster Olympic for the start of the 1890–1891 season but for an unknown reason he left in January 1891 and signed for The Wednesday. The Wednesday were in the Football Alliance and were having a poor season finishing bottom of the League in the Spring of 1891. For the next two seasons, 1891-1892 and 1892–1893, Hodder played for Lincoln City. Lincoln City were not members of a League but competed for and won the Lincolnshire Senior Trophy. In 1893-1894 Lincoln City were founder members of the Football League Division 2. Hodder did not play for the first team and left in 1893. In 1893 Hodder signed for Mansfield Town. Mansfield Town played in the Midland Counties League and this was Hodder' last club. It isn't known when he retired and what he did after his football career had finished. Bill Hodder was living in Nottingham when he died at the age of 31 in March 1897.
