= Harold Andrews (footballer, born 1903) =

English footballer (1903–1988)

Personal information
- Full name: Harold Andrews
- Date of birth: 13 August 1903
- Place of birth: Lincoln, Lincolnshire, England
- Date of death: August 1988 (aged 84–85)
- Place of death: Rushcliffe, Nottinghamshire, England
- Height: 5 ft 10 in (1.78 m)
- Positions: Forward; left half

Senior career*
Years	Team	Apps	(Gls)
–	St Botolph's OB (Lincoln)		
1925–1928	Lincoln City	75	(41)
1928–1932	Notts County	134	(55)
1932–1935	Barnsley	110	(42)
1935–1936	Luton Town	1	(0)
1936–1938	Accrington Stanley	65	(2)
–	Player's (Nottingham)		
- * Club domestic league appearances and goals

Harold Andrews (13 August 1903 – August 1988) was an English footballer who scored 140 goals in 385 appearances in the Football League playing for Lincoln City, Notts County, Barnsley, Luton Town and Accrington Stanley. He played at inside left, centre forward, and left half throughout his career.
