= Richard Daft =

English cricketer

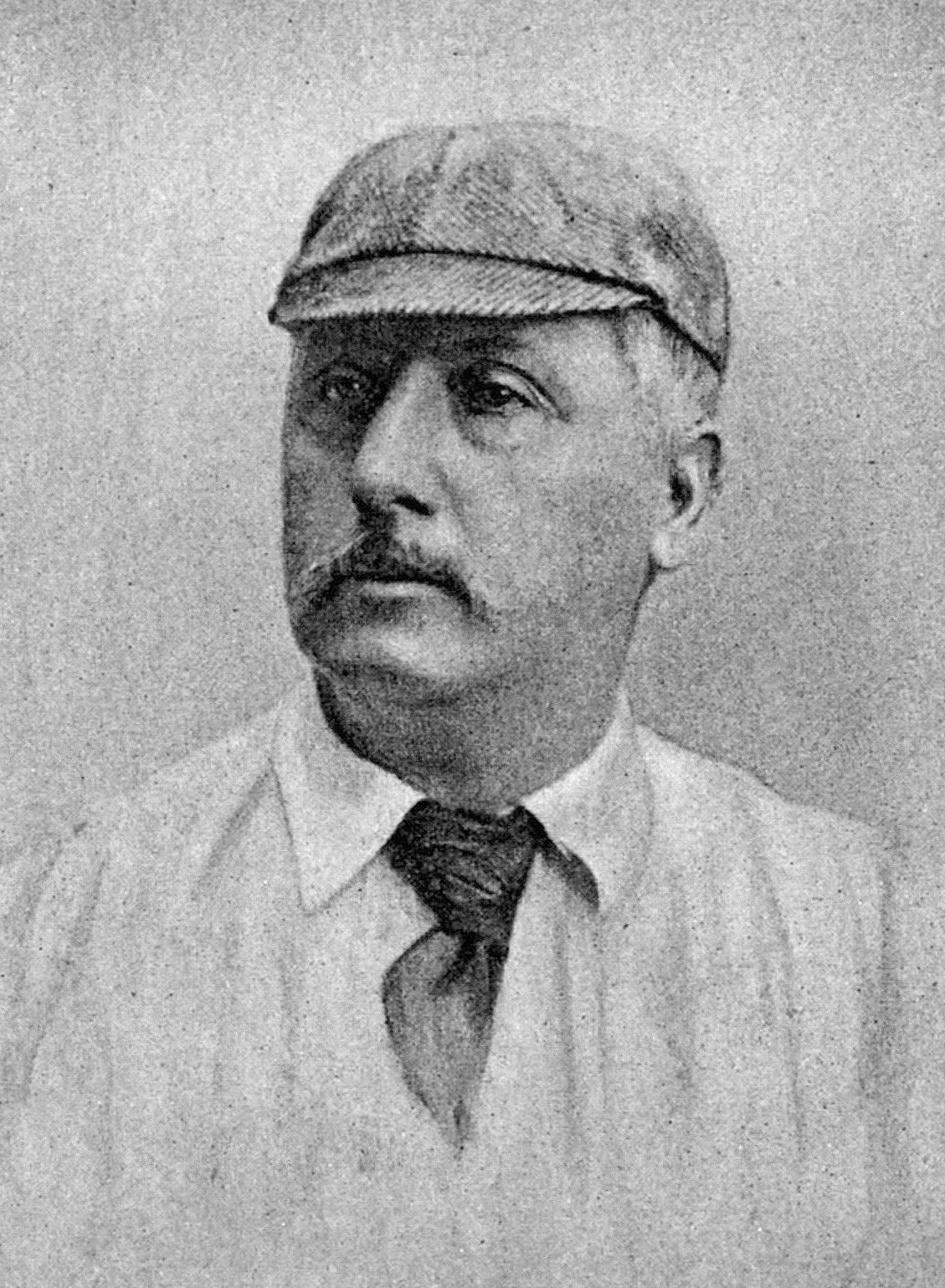

Personal information
- Born: 2 November 1835; Nottingham, Nottinghamshire, England
- Died: 18 July 1900 (aged 64); Radcliffe on Trent, Nottinghamshire, England
- Batting: Right-handed
- Bowling: Slow
- Relatives: Charles Daft (brother); Butler Parr (brother-in-law); Harry Daft (son); Richard Daft (son)

Domestic team information
- Years: Team
- 1858–1891: Nottinghamshire
- 1883: MCC
- FC debut: 24 June 1858 Nottinghamshire v Surrey
- Last FC: 27 August 1891 Nottinghamshire v Middlesex

Career statistics
Competition	First-class
Matches	254
Runs scored	9,788
Batting average	25.42
100s/50s	7/50
Top score	161
Balls bowled	2,012
Wickets	51
Bowling average	20.98
5 wickets in innings	2
10 wickets in match	0
Best bowling	6/59
Catches/stumpings	155/–
- Source: CricketArchive, 25 March 2018

Richard Daft (2 November 1835 – 18 July 1900) was an English cricketer. He was one of the best batsmen of his day, the peak of his career (which lasted from 1858 to 1891) being the 1860s and early 1870s.

== Life and career ==
Born in Nottingham, most of his historically important matches were played for Nottinghamshire and the All England Eleven, and he captained the former side from 1871 to 1880. Unusually for the period, after beginning his career as a professional he later became an amateur. Two of his most notable innings were 118 at Lord's for North against South in 1862 and 102 for the Players against the Gentlemen (see Gentlemen v Players) at Lord's in 1872.

He led a strong side to North America in late 1879, which beat a XV of Philadelphia. He appeared in only a handful of matches after 1880.

A portrait of him painted in 1875 by Frank Miles is owned by Nottinghamshire County Cricket Club. Miles's family were keen cricketers with a number of his brothers playing for Nottinghamshire.

It was written of him: "Not a big hitter, but played a thoroughly sound and at the same time graceful game." He was ridiculed on one occasion when he came out to bat with his head wrapped in a towel for protection in protest at what turned out to be a fatal injury received by the previous batsman (George Summers), due to short-pitched bowling on the notoriously uneven Lord's pitch.

He wrote Kings of Cricket: Reminiscences and Anecdotes with Hints on the Game, which was published by J. W. Arrowsmith/Simpkin, Marshall, Hamilton, Kent & Co. in 1893.

Daft ran the nearby Trent Bridge Inn and at one time he was a partner in the Radcliffe Brewery, but he died bankrupt at Radcliffe on Trent in 1900.

His brother, Charles, his sons, Harry and Richard, and his father-in-law, Butler Parr, all played cricket. In August 1891, he played with Harry in the county eleven, at Kennington Oval against Surrey. Richard had returned to the Nottinghamshire side after an absence of ten years because Arthur Shrewsbury was forced to stand down through injury. Neither father nor son made any particular impact in this game, with Harry scoring 5 and 0, and Richard 12 and 2 as Surrey won by an innings and 46 runs.

His great-grandson Robin Butler served as the Cabinet Secretary (1988–1998).

Sporting positions
Preceded by George Parr	Nottinghamshire County cricket captain 1870–1880	Succeeded by William Oscroft
