= Charles Daft =

English cricketer

Charles Frederick Daft (8 June 1830 – 9 March 1915) was an English cricketer. His brother Richard and nephews Richard and Harry were also cricketers.
