= Thomas Cooke (physiognomist) =

English physiognomist

- Born: 20 March 1763; Sheffield, England
- Died: 26 July 1818 (aged 55); Manchester, England
- Occupation: Physiognomist

Thomas Cooke (20 March 1763 – 26 July 1818) was an English physiognomist.

== Biography ==
Cooke was born at Sheffield on 20 March 1763. He was engaged in trade early in life, but when twenty-two years old he began the study of physiognomy, of which "science" he became a devoted enthusiast and expounder. He died at Manchester on 26 July 1818, and in the following year his papers were collected and published under the title of "A Practical and Familiar View of the Science of Physiognomy."
