= Tom McLean (scientist) =

British chemist

Tom McLean is a British chemist who is currently the COO of the Innovative Vector Control Consortium.

== Education ==
McLean attended Oxford University, receiving an MPhil in chemistry and a D Phil in organometallic reaction mechanisms. His early training was in “chemical and process technology research for specialty chemicals.”

== Career ==
McLean has spent three decades in the chemical industry, working for such firms as ICI, Merck, Rexam, and Avecia. At Merck he was vice president, vaccines and infectious diseases. He “led a number of multinational consortia spanning industrial and academic partners to bring about the development and exploitation of novel chemical technologies targeted at consumer and industrial markets.” Over time he became increasingly “interested in the marketing of technological advances and the introduction of groundbreaking consumer products.”

=== IVCC ===
He is currently “responsible for Access and New Paradigms in Vector Control” at the Innovative Vector Control Consortium (IVCC), where he serves as COO. The term “vector control” refers to the development of pyrethroids, which are organic compounds used as insecticides and insect repellents.

Established in 2005 thanks to a $50 million grant to the Liverpool School of Tropical Medicine from the Bill & Melinda Gates Foundation, IVCC is “the only Product Development Partnership (PDP) working in vector control.” It works with “industry, the public sector, and academia” to “facilitate the development of novel and improved public health insecticides and formulations to combat the rapidly growing problem of insecticide resistance” and thereby “prevent the transmission of insect-borne disease.”

Its primary emphasis is on the eradication of malaria, although it also seeks to eliminate other mosquito-borne diseases. "The role of the IVCC,” he said in 2009, “is to unlock the talent and enthusiasm of companies like Syngenta [a Swiss producer of agrochemicals] to enable them to take on huge research efforts for public health by absorbing the front end costs."

In April 2010, it was announced that IVCC and Syngenta had reached a “key milestone” in the fight against malaria. The newly developed chemical Actellic 300CS would “provide at least 8 months control of pyrethroid resistant mosquitoes.” McLean said: “The more effective control of mosquitoes is vital to the fight against malaria. Current tools can be highly effective but resistance threatens the effectiveness of existing products. We need innovative solutions to sustain the ground gained over malaria in recent years and to continue the push towards eventual eradication. This project amply demonstrates that IVCC’s concept of covering initial risk to stimulate innovation is working and that industry has enthusiastically bought into the product development partnership model which we have pioneered for vector control.”

In May 2017 McLean gave a speech in Madrid emphasizing the importance of cost effectiveness in marketing insecticides.

In July 2011 it was announced that the IVCC had signed an agreement with Scynexis, Inc., a New Jersey biotech firm, under which the latter would “screen its extensive chemical library” in search of chemicals “suitable for development into new insecticide active ingredients.” McLean said: "We look forward to working with Scynexis and are hopeful that their expertise in insecticide discovery research will yield further candidates for development as new active ingredients. Disease control programmes rely on effective insecticides for vector control and resistance to all the insecticides currently approved for vector control is already present in some mosquito populations, posing a major threat to recent gains in malaria control. This project joins our other discovery programmes aimed at developing three new active ingredients unaffected by known resistance mechanisms by 2020."

In August 2012 it was announced that IVCC and Bayer CropScience had agreed to “cooperate for a further three years in the search for new active ingredients effective against mosquitoes.” McLean said: “Resistance to current products is one of the greatest problems facing us in our battle against malaria – one of the biggest killers in the developing world. As an important pillar of our New Active Ingredient project portfolio, the collaboration with Bayer CropScience gives us access to the profound expertise of the agrochemical industry and brings its special aptitude to bear on one of the greatest challenges to health in the developing world.”

According to a 2013 article in the Financial Times (FT), McLean has maintained that the World Health Organization’s evaluation process “can act as a disincentive to companies to develop new products because they are required to invest heavily in demonstrating that a product is safe and effective and then must make that data publicly available.” FT quoted McLean as saying that this process “produces a barrier to innovation among industry partners that's severe at the moment,” he says. “There are a number of companies saying they will not bring new products through until this is sorted out....We have to draw a reasonable balance between rewarding companies for creating the innovative products that we need without creating monopolies that are then unduly exploited.”
