= Ted Harker =

English footballer

Personal information
- Full name: Edward Harker
- Date of birth: 9 November 1862
- Place of birth: Nottingham, England
- Date of death: June 1960 (aged 97)June 1950
- Place of death: Newark-on-Trent
- Position: Forward

Senior career*
Years	Team	Apps	(Gls)
1882–1889	Notts County	2	(0)
- * Club domestic league appearances and goals

Edward Harker was an English footballer who played in The Football League for Notts County.

== Early career ==
Ted Harker was born and grew up in Plumtree, a suburb of the city of Nottingham, in Nottinghamshire. Ted Harker' first recorded appearance for Notts County was made against the crack Scottish amateurs, Queen's Park, in November 1882, but it was not until season 1886–87 that Harker featured on a regular basis. 25 matches and six goals in that season being his best return, within overall figures of 66 matches and 11 goals. Of note, but Harker may/may not have played is that Notts County reached the Sixth Round of the FA Cup in 1887, losing 4–1 to the eventual losing Finalists, West Bromwich Albion

== 1888–1889 Season ==
Ted Harker, playing as one of the forwards, made his League debut on 15 September 1888 at Anfield, the then home of Everton. Notts County lost to the home team 2–1. Ted Harker appeared in two of the 22 League matches played by Notts County in season 1888–89.

== 1889 onwards ==
Harker retired from football in November 1888 and variously worked as a warehouseman and later in his working life a maltster's clerk.

He lived a long life and did not die until June 1950 aged 87. He died in Newark-on-Trent.
