= Thomas Allin (footballer) =

English footballer (1862–1945)

Tom Allin
Personal information
- Full name: Thomas Allin
- Date of birth: 5 April 1862
- Place of birth: Boston, Lincolnshire, England
- Date of death: 6 September 1945 (aged 83)
- Place of death: Boston, Lincolnshire, England
- Position: Centre forward

Senior career*
Years	Team	Apps	(Gls)
1887–1888	Boston		
1888–1889	Notts County	6	(2)
- * Club domestic league appearances and goals

Thomas Allin (5 April 1862 – 6 September 1945) was an English professional footballer who played for Notts County in their first season in the Football League.

== Playing career ==
Tom Allin was signed by Boston Football Club in 1887 although 'Garth Dykes' states he came to Notts County from Accrington. As Allin was a Boston man it is more likely that he played for Boston. There is no clear record of when he signed for Notts County but, at the latest, it would have been 1888.

== Season 1888–1889 ==
Tom Allin was given a run out leading the Notts County attack during the first League season, a term when no player emerged as the undisputed centre–forward. Tom Allin, playing at centre–forward, made his League and Notts County debut on 6 October 1888 at Trent Bridge, the then home of Notts County. The visitors were Blackburn Rovers and the match ended as a 3–3 draw. Allin scored his debut League goals on 20 October 1888 at Stoney Lane, the then home of West Bromwich Albion. All the goals were scored in the first–half. Allin' first levelled the scores at 1–1. His second, reduced West Bromwich Albion' lead to 4–2, and that was the final score. Allin appeared in six of the 22 League matches played by Notts County in season 1888–89 and scored two League goals. Allin played at centre–forward (six appearances) in a Notts County forward–line that scored three–League–goals–or–more on three separate occasions.
