= Herbert Snook =

English footballer

Personal information
- Full name: Herbert Durrant Snook
- Date of birth: 23 December 1867
- Place of birth: Nottingham, England
- Date of death: 13 October 1947 (aged 79)
- Place of death: Lenton, City of Nottingham
- Position: Full back

Senior career*
| Years | Team | Apps | (Gls) |
| 1886 | Trent College | | |
| 1888–1889 | Notts County | 1 | (0) |
- * Club domestic league appearances and goals

Herbert Snook (23 December 1867 – 13 October 1947) was an English footballer who played in The Football League for Notts County.

Not long after he turned 21 he was signed by Notts County F.C. but played no first-team matches in the 1887–1888 season.

Herbert died on 13 October 1947 in Lenton, a suburb of the City of Nottingham at the age of 79.
