= 1881–82 in English football =

Football in England
- Season: 1881–82

Men's football
- FA Cup: Old Etonians

The 1881–82 season was the 11th season of competitive football in England.

== National team ==
England played Ireland for the first time. Their 13–0 victory is still the team's largest ever win.

| Date | Venue | Opponents | Score* | Comp | England scorers | Scotland/Wales scorers |
|---|---|---|---|---|---|---|
| 18 February 1882 | Bloomfield, Belfast (A) | Ireland | 13–0 | F^{†} | Howard Vaughton (Aston Villa) (5), Arthur Brown (Aston Villa) (4), James Brown (Blackburn Rovers) (2), Charles Bambridge (Swifts) & Henry Cursham (Notts County) | |
| 11 March 1882 | Hampden Park, Glasgow (A) | Scotland | 1–5 | F | Howard Vaughton (Aston Villa) (35 mins) | George Ker (2), R McPherson, William Harrower, John L Kay |
| 13 March 1882 | Racecourse Ground, Wrexham (A) | Wales | 3–5 | F | Billy Mosforth (The Wednesday) (30 mins), Edward Hagarty Parry (Old Carthusians) (35 mins) & Henry Cursham (Notts County) (48 mins) | Alfred Jones (o.g.), William Pierce Owen (2), John R Morgan, John Vaughan |

* England score given first

^{†} This match constituted Ireland's international debut

Key

- H = Home match
- A = Away match
- F = Friendly

== Honours ==
| Competition | Winner |
|---|---|
| FA Cup | Old Etonians (2) |

Notes = Number in parentheses is the times that club has won that honour. * indicates new record for competition
