= Ben Warburton =

English footballer

Personal information
- Full name: Benjamin Frederick Warburton
- Date of birth: Q3 1864
- Place of birth: Worksop, England
- Date of death: 22 September 1943
- Position: Half back

Senior career*
Years	Team	Apps	(Gls)
1888–1889	Notts County	2	(0)
- * Club domestic league appearances and goals

Benjamin Frederick Warburton (1864–22 September 1943), known as Ben Warburton, was an English footballer who played in The Football League for Notts County.

== Early career ==
Ben Warburton was once described as "A sterling half-back". As a young man he played cricket for Notts Castle Cricket Club.

== 1888–1889 season ==
Playing at centre–half, Warburton made his Club & League debut on 8 September 1888 at Anfield, the then home of Everton. Notts County lost to the home team 2–1. Ben Warburton appeared in two of the 22 League matches played by Notts County in season 1888–89.

== 1889 onwards ==
In 1889 Warburton took a posting in South Africa and emigrated there to work in the telegraph service. He must have returned to Nottingham as births, marriages and deaths records his death at the age of 79 in Basford, a suburb of Nottingham, on 22 September 1943.
