= Edwin Wardle =

English footballer

Personal information
- Full name: Edwin Silvester Wardle
- Date of birth: 11 January 1870
- Place of birth: Nottingham, England
- Position: Forward

Senior career*
Years	Team	Apps	(Gls)
1888–1889	Notts County	2	(0)
- * Club domestic league appearances and goals

Edwin Silvester Wardle (born 11 January 1870) was an English footballer who played in The Football League for Notts County.

== Early career ==
Edwin Wardle was born on 11 January 1870 in Nottingham, Nottinghamshire. Nothing appears to be recorded about his youth career or his early playing days until he made his League debut on 15 September 1888.

== 1888–1889 season ==
Edwin Wardle, playing as one of the two winger', made his League debut on 15 September 1888 at Anfield, the then home of Everton. Notts County lost to the home team 2–1. When Edwin Wardle played as a winger against Everton on 15 September 1888 he was 18 years 248 days old; which made him, on the second weekend of League football, Notts County' youngest player. Edwin Wardle appeared in two of the 22 League matches played by Notts County in season 1888–89. Edwin Wardle played a more active role in the 1888–89 FA Cup.

== 1889 onwards ==
Wardle left the club and retired from football (as far as the records show) early in the Spring of 1889.

== Life after football ==
Nothing is recorded as to what Wardle did after he left Notts County and there is no record of his death. It is possible that he left the United Kingdom and died abroad. However that is speculation.
