= Thomas Coke =

Thomas Coke (pronounced Cook) may refer to:

- Thomas Coke (MP for Winchester), see Winchester
- Thomas Coke (MP for Salisbury) (died 1523)
- Thomas Coke (privy counsellor) (1674–1727), of Melbourne Hall, Derbyshire, created privy counsellor in 1708
- Thomas Coke (bishop) (1747–1814), early Methodist
- Thomas Coke, 1st Earl of Leicester (fifth creation) (1697–1759), English land-owner, member of parliament and patron of the arts
- Thomas Coke, 1st Earl of Leicester (seventh creation) (1754–1842), agricultural innovator, created 1st Earl of Leicester of Holkham
- Thomas Coke (MP for Leicester) (died 1656), English politician who sat in the House of Commons from 1640 to 1645
- Thomas Coke, 2nd Earl of Leicester (1822–1909), British peer
- Thomas Coke, 3rd Earl of Leicester (1848–1941), British peer and soldier
- Thomas Coke, 4th Earl of Leicester (1880–1949), British peer
- Thomas Coke, 5th Earl of Leicester (1908–1976), British peer
- Thomas Coke, 8th Earl of Leicester (born 1965), British peer
- Thomas Coke (seneschal of Gascony), 14th-century English noble

== See also ==
- Thomas Cooke (disambiguation)
- Earl of Leicester
