= John Clements (footballer) =

English footballer

Personal information
- Full name: John Ernest Clements
- Date of birth: 3 November 1867
- Place of birth: East Markham, England
- Date of death: 1945 (aged 77–78)
- Place of death: Chesterfield, England
- Position: Defender

Senior career*
Years	Team	Apps	(Gls)
1887–1888	St. Saviour's Nottingham		
1888–1890	Notts County	14	(0)
1892–1894	Newton Heath	36	(0)
1894–1895	Rotherham Town	27	(2)
1895	Newcastle United	0	(0)
- * Club domestic league appearances and goals

John Ernest Clements (3 November 1867 – 1945) was an English footballer. His regular position was at full back. He was born in East Markham, Nottinghamshire. He played for Newton Heath, Notts County, and Rotherham Town.

== Early career ==
There is no record of when John Clements left East Markham and came to Nottingham. By the year of his 20th birthday, he had signed for a Nottingham amateur club called St. Saviour's and played for them in the 1887–88 season. In 1888, he was discovered by Notts County and signed for them in October that year.

== League & Notts County debut ==
Clements made his debut for the club playing at left-back in a Football League match against Burnley at Trent Bridge on 27 October 1888. Notts County won the match 6–1, which made Clements the first Notts County player to win on debut. Between 27 October 1888 and 16 March 1889, Clements played 12 League games and three FA Cup ties, all at left-back.

== 1889 onwards ==
Clements was retained for the 1889–90 season, but was now considered a reserve player. He only appeared in two League games and once in the FA Cup. In the 1891–92 season, he remained on the Notts County books but did not play in the first team.

Clements left Notts County in June 1892 and joined Newton Heath, who had just been admitted to the Football League. Clements played in 36 League games (over two seasons) and appeared in one FA Cup tie in 1892–1893.

In August 1894 Clements transferred from Newton Heath to Rotherham United who were in Football League Division 2. He played only one season at Rotherham. He played 27 League matches, scoring three goals. He also played one FA Cup tie.

In May 1895 he transferred to Newcastle United. However, he never played for the first team due to injuries. It is also not recorded when he left Newcastle United.

== Life after football ==
As said Clements date of retirement from football was not recorded. It is not clear what Clements did for a living after leaving football. He eventually moved to Chesterfield Derbyshire and died there in 1945 at the age of 77.
