= Alf Shelton =

English footballer

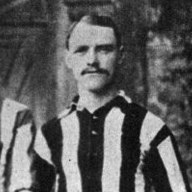

Personal information
- Date of birth: 11 September 1865
- Place of birth: Nottingham, England
- Date of death: 24 July 1923 (aged 57)
- Place of death: Nottingham, England
- Position: Left half

Senior career*
Years	Team	Apps	(Gls)
- Notts Rangers
1888–1896	Notts County	195	(5)
1896–1897	Loughborough	15	(1)
1897–1900	Ilkeston Town		
Total		210	(6)

International career
1889–1892	England	6	(1)
- * Club domestic league appearances and goals

Alfred Shelton (11 September 1865 – 24 July 1923) was an English international footballer, who played as a left half. His brother Charles was also a professional footballer.

Born in Nottingham, Shelton played for Notts Rangers, Notts County, Loughborough and Ilkeston Town, and earned six caps for England between 1889 and 1892.

== Early career ==
Alf Shelton was one of three brothers – Harry and Charlie Shelton the others – who did so much for Nottingham football. Alf was educated at St. Nicholas School, which he left to join Notts Rangers. He signed in 1884. When the club collapsed in 1888 he, along with other members, threw in their lot with "The Magpies", the nickname for Notts County. He signed in August 1888. A wing half with exceptional stamina, he was a difficult player to get past. He also excelled in heading, often getting his head in the way of goal-bound shots. NOTE: The Dykes book claims that Alf Shelton left Notts Rangers and signed for Notts County because Notts Rangers collapsed. Wikipedia and Football Club History Database show that Notts Rangers played in the 1888–89 and 1889–90 FA Cup competitions and took part in the first season, 1889–90, of the Midland League.

== 1888–89 season ==
Alf Shelton, playing at wing–half, made his Notts County & League debut on 8 September 1888 at Anfield, the then home of Everton. Notts County lost to the home team 2–1. Alf Shelton appeared in 21 of the 22 League matches played by Notts County in season 1888–89. 21 appearances was the record for a Notts County player in season 1888–89. As a wing–half (21 appearances ) he played in a Notts County midfield that achieved big (three–League–goals–in–a–match–or–more) wins on two separate occasions.

== 1889 onwards ==
Alf Shelton appeared in both of Notts County' two FA Cup Finals and won six England caps, and in 1892 was offered the opportunity to captain the newly formed Liverpool club. Despite what constituted a most generous offer at the time (£250) per annum he was not tempted to leave the Magpies. He played for Notts County from 1888 to 1896 and then moved to League Division 2 club, Loughborough. He only stayed with Loughborough for the one season, 1896–1897. He signed for Ilkeston Town in July 1897. Ilkeston Town competed in the Midland League and the FA Cup. One of their two best cup runs was in 1897-1898 when they reached the 5th Qualifying Round. It is not known whether Shelton played in that Cup run but he was on their books as a player.

== End of career ==
Ilkeston Town folded in 1900 and it is assumed that is when Shelton retired as a player. In the same year he returned to Notts County as a Director on the Club' Board. He was on the County Board until 1910. He died in tragic circumstances on 24 July 1923. It is not recorded whether he worked at the Royal Ordnance Factory, but he was on site and was killed when a crane collapsed onto him. In one source the factory is described as a Cammell Laird factory. The factory was opened by H. M. Government in 1916 as a Royal Ordnance Factory to manufacture shells for the Western Front. Cammell Laird built the factory and managed it on behalf of HM Government. In the year Shelton met his fatal accident the site had been bought outright by Cammell Laird and the site was used to make railway goods wagons.
