= Billy Flint =

English footballer

Personal information
- Full name: William Arthur Flint
- Date of birth: 12 March 1890
- Place of birth: Underwood, England
- Date of death: 5 February 1955 (aged 64)
- Height: 5 ft 7 in (1.70 m)
- Positions: Right half; forward

Senior career*
Years	Team	Apps	(Gls)
- Eastwood Rangers
1908–1926	Notts County	376	(40)
- * Club domestic league appearances and goals

William Arthur Flint (12 March 1890 - 5 February 1955) was an English footballer who played in the Football League for Notts County. Flint was also a first-class cricketer active 1919–29 who played for Nottinghamshire.
