= George H. Brown (footballer) =

English footballer

Personal information
- Full name: George Henry Brown
- Date of birth: Q3 1866
- Place of birth: Nottingham, England
- Date of death: Q2 1903 (aged 36)
- Place of death: Nottinghamshire, England
- Position: Wing half

Senior career*
Years	Team	Apps	(Gls)
1887–1888	Nottingham Forest		
1888–1889	Notts County	19	(1)
1889	Nottingham Forest		
- * Club domestic league appearances and goals

George Henry Brown (1866–1903) was an English footballer who played in The Football League for Notts County.

== Early career ==
George Brown was born and grew up in Nottingham, Nottinghamshire. In 1887 George Brown signed for Nottingham Forest. Nottingham Forest was formed in 1866. In the year Brown started playing for Forest they reached the Fifth Round of the FA Cup losing 4–2 to The Wednesday. Nottingham Forest joined the Football League in 1892. George Brown left Notts County in 1888. According to births, deaths and marriages data a George Henry Brown was married, in Nottingham, in Q3 1888, which was around his 22nd birthday and making his League and Notts County debut.

== 1888–1889 season ==
George Brown signed for Notts County in 1888. Playing at wing–half, Brown made his Club & League debut on 8 September 1888 at Anfield, the then home of Everton. Notts County lost to the home team 2–1. George Brown, playing at wing–half, scored his debut and only League goal on 15 December 1888 at Leamington Road, the then home of Blackburn Rovers. Notts County lost to the home team 5–2. George Brown scored the second of Notts County' two goals. George Brown appeared in 19 of the 22 League matches played by Notts County in season 1888–89 and scored one League goal. As a wing–half (19 appearances ) he played in a Notts County midfield that achieved big (three–League–goals–in–a–match–or–more) wins on two occasions.

== 1889 onwards ==
Brown was not retained at the end of the season and so he returned to Nottingham Forest. There are no records of what happened to him after he joined Forest. However, births, marriages and deaths data record that a George Henry Brown died in the county of Nottinghamshire in Quarter two of 1903. If that was the George Brown he was 37/38 when he died.
