= Frank Guttridge =

English cricketer and footballer (1866–1918)

Personal information
- Full name: Frank Herbert Guttridge
- Date of birth: 12 April 1866
- Place of birth: Nottingham, England
- Date of death: 13 June 1918 (aged 52)
- Place of death: Nottingham, England
- Position: Full back

Senior career*
| Years | Team | Apps | (Gls) |
| 1886–1888 | Heanor Town | | |
| 1888–1889 | Notts County | 17 | (0) |
| 1889–1894 | Nottingham Forest | | |
| 1894–1895 | Notts County | 1 | (0) |
| 1895 | Nelson | | |
- * Club domestic league appearances and goals

Frank Herbert Guttridge (12 April 1866 – 13 June 1918) was an English cricketer and footballer who played in The Football League for Notts County. He also played cricket for Nottinghamshire and Sussex, making a total of 107 first-class appearances between 1889 and 1904, during which he scored 2,190 runs and took 176 wickets.

== Early career ==
Frank Guttridge was a footballer of some ability but was rather better known as a cricketer. He signed for Heanor Town in 1886. Notts County signed him in March 1888 as the 1887–1888 season was coming to a close.

== Season 1888–89 ==
Frank Guttridge, playing at full-back, made his League debut on 8 September 1888 at Anfield, the then home of Everton. Notts County lost to the home team 2–1. Note: No records indicate whether the Everton match was Guttridge' Notts County debut.

Frank Guttridge appeared in 17 of the 22 League matches played by Notts County in season 1888–89. As a full-back (15 appearances) he played in a Notts County defence that restricted the opposition to one–League–goal–in–a–match on three separate occasions.

== After Notts County ==
Frank Guttridge was not retained for the 1889–1890 season and signed for local rivals Nottingham Forest and was on their books for five years. Guttridge returned to Notts County in 1894, who, by then, were in League Division 2 and made one (his last) League appearance during the 1894–1895 season. He left Notts County in 1895 and went to North-West England to play for Nelson. After he stopped playing football Guttridge was more involved in the administration of cricket, including being an umpire.

== End of career ==
As stated Guttridge became a cricket umpire and seemed to have little involvement with football. He died on 13 June 1918, in his home town, Nottingham, aged 52.
