= Arthur Shaw (footballer, born 1869) =

English footballer

Personal information
- Full name: Arthur Fredrick Shaw
- Date of birth: 1 August 1869
- Place of birth: Basford, Nottinghamshire, England
- Date of death: 1946 (aged 76–77)
- Position: Forward

Senior career*
Years	Team	Apps	(Gls)
1888–1891	Notts County	4	(0)
1892–1897	Nottingham Forest	79	(11)
1897	Loughborough	11	(3)
- * Club domestic league appearances and goals

Arthur Fredrick Shaw (born 1 August 1869) was an English footballer who played in The Football League for Loughborough, Notts County and Nottingham Forest.
