= Tom McLean (Scottish footballer) =

Scottish footballer

Thomas McLean
Personal information
- Full name: Thomas McLean
- Date of birth: August 1866
- Place of birth: Alexandria, Scotland
- Date of death: 27 November 1936 (aged 70)
- Position: Full-back

Senior career*
Years	Team	Apps	(Gls)
1887–1888	Vale of Leven		
1888–1889	Notts County	12	(0)
1889	Heanor Town		
1889–1892	Notts County	54	(0)
1892–1893	Derby County	2	(0)
1893–1894	Notts County	0	(0)
Total		66	(0)
- * Club domestic league appearances and goals

Thomas McLean (August 1866 – 1936) was a Scottish footballer who played in the English Football League for Derby County and Notts County.

== Early career ==
Tom Mclean, despite lacking any physical advantage at 5'6" and 10st 5lbs was a strong defender with a magnificent clearing kick. The first Football Club to sign Tom McLean was Vale of Leven and Tom McLean signed for them in 1887. Vale of Leven had formed in 1874 and reached the Fourth Round of the Scottish Cup in the season McLean played there. McLean joined Notts County (1888) before the legalising of professionalism, having first come to Nottingham on holiday. In the event, he remained for the rest of his life, marrying a local girl in 1892.

== 1888–1889 Season ==
Tom McLean signed for Notts County in the Summer of 1888. Playing at full–back, McLean made his club and League debut on 8 September 1888 at Anfield, the then home of Everton. Notts County lost to the home team 2–1.

Tom McLean appeared in 12 of the 22 League matches played by Notts County in season 1888–89. As a full–back and centre–half (nine appearances at full–back and two appearances at centre–half) he played in a Notts County defence that achieved one clean–sheet and restricted the opposition to one–League–goal–in–a–match on three separate occasions.

== 1889 onwards ==
McLean left Notts County in June 1889 for Heanor Town a club near Derby. He only stayed two months and in August he re-signed for Notts County and became a key player for the three seasons 1889 – 1892. In the 1890–1891 season a knee injury meant he could not play in the FA Cup Final (which Notts County lost to Blackburn Rovers). In August 1892 he signed for Derby County but only played six games as the knee injury was limiting his ability to play. In September 1893 he returned to Notts County but had to retire due to the knee injury picked up two years before.

McLean went into the Licensed trade but 15 years after he stopped playing Notts County signed him as an Assistant Trainer and he stayed with the club until 1929.

One of his most treasured possessions was the unused return railway ticket from 1888 when he came to Nottingham from Scotland and never returned. He died on 27 November 1936 in his adopted home town of Nottingham aged 70.
