= Les Bradd =

English footballer

Personal information
- Full name: Leslie John Bradd
- Date of birth: 5 November 1947 (age 78)
- Place of birth: Buxton, England
- Height: 6 ft 0 in (1.83 m)
- Position: Striker

Senior career*
Years	Team	Apps	(Gls)
1966–1967	Rotherham United	3	(1)
1967–1978	Notts County	398	(125)
1978–1981	Stockport County	117	(31)
1981–1982	Wigan Athletic	63	(25)
1982	→ Bristol Rovers (loan)	1	(1)
Total		582	(182)
- * Club domestic league appearances and goals

Les Bradd (born 5 November 1947) is an English former professional footballer who played as a striker. He is notable for being the all-time leading goalscorer for Notts County.

== Rotherham United ==
Bradd started his league career at Rotherham who signed him from non-league club East Sterndale. His spell at Millmoor was a brief one, in which he only scored one goal which, ironically, was the winning goal against Notts County, the club with which he is most associated, in a League Cup tie. He joined Notts shortly afterwards.

== Notts County ==
It was at Notts County where his career took shape. Bradd spent eleven seasons at Meadow Lane, barely missing a game as the club climbed steadily away from the lower reaches of the fourth division into a comfortable second division position.

Though the club struggled in his first season, Bradd finished top scorer, with 10 goals. It was the arrival of Don Masson in 1968 that kick started the club's upturn in fortune over the next decade. The 1970/71 season saw the club win promotion, and the Division Four title, by 9 points. The club finished fourth in its first season back in the Third Division, with Bradd finishing as top scorer with 21 goals. The following season Bradd earned his second promotion with the club as it returned to the Second Division after a long absence, also reaching the League Cup quarter finals, a run which saw County beat two top flight clubs, Stoke and Southampton, with Bradd scoring in both games.

Although linked to moves to the top flight with Coventry and WBA, Bradd spent a further five seasons at the club, which saw County establish themselves as a comfortable second division side. Bradd finished as top scorer a further two times, in 1975/76 and 1976/77, though the last of these was jointly held with Mick Vinter. During this period the club embarked on another notable League Cup run in 1975/76, again reaching the Quarter Finals and knocking out Sunderland, Leeds and Everton on the way. The defeat of Everton came in a 2-1 Replay victory at Meadow Lane in which Bradd scored twice in arguably his finest County performance.

Finally in 1978, at the age of 30, after 11 seasons which saw Bradd score 125 league goals, he was sold to Stockport.

== Stockport County ==
Stockport's purchase of Bradd proved to be an inspired one as Bradd scored 31 league goals in his three-year spell at Edgeley Park, despite often being employed as a central defender.

Whilst at Stockport Bradd scored the only hat-trick of his career when he netted three times in the last ten minutes as Stockport came from 4–1 down to claim a 4–4 draw against promotion chasing Barnsley. Another highlight from his time at Edgely Park came when he scored against Arsenal at Highbury in the League Cup.

Bradd was freed by Stockport at the end of the 1980/81 season.

== Late career ==
Bradd joined Wigan following his release from Stockport. Despite being 33 years of age, Bradd helped the club, who had only joined the football league three years earlier, to their first ever promotion, scoring nineteen league goals. He also netted yet another memorable game in the League Cup, scoring a goal as Wigan shocked Chelsea with a 4–2 win.

The following season Bradd made another twenty two third division appearances for Wigan, scoring five times. He also briefly went on loan to Bristol Rovers, scoring in his only appearance. He retired at the end of the season at the age of thirty five.
