= Charlie Shelton =

English footballer

Personal information
- Full name: Charles Shelton
- Date of birth: 22 January 1864
- Place of birth: Nottingham, England
- Date of death: 18 September 1955 (aged 91)
- Place of death: Eastwell, Leicestershire, England
- Position: Left half

Senior career*
Years	Team	Apps	(Gls)
1883–1887	Notts Rangers		
1887–1889	Notts County	15	(1)
1889–1890	Burton Wanderers		
1890–1891	Notts County	4	(0)
1891	Burton Wanderers		
1892	Notts County	1	(0)
Total		20	(1)

International career
1888	England	1	(0)
- * Club domestic league appearances and goals

Charles Shelton (22 January 1864 – 18 September 1955) was an England international footballer who played as a left half. His brother Alf also played football for England.

== Career ==
Born in Nottingham, Shelton played for Notts Rangers and Notts County, and earned one cap for England in 1888.

Charles Shelton signed for Notts County in 1887. Made his Club debut in December 1887. Charles Shelton, playing at centre–half, made his League debut on 22 September 1888 at Victoria Ground, the then home of Stoke. Notts County were defeated by the home team 3–0. Shelton scored his debut, and only League goal on 10 November 1888 at Trent Bridge. The visitors were Accrington and Charles Shelton scored Notts County' second equaliser in a match that ended 3–3. Charles Shelton appeared in 15 of the 22 League matches that Notts County played in season 1888–89. Charles Shelton, playing at centre–half (15 appearances) played in a Notts County defence that kept one clean–sheet and restricted the opposition to one–League–goal–in–a–match on four separate occasions.

In 1889 Charles Shelton left Notts County and signed for Burton Wanderers. In 1890 Shelton returned to Notts County but only made four League appearances in season 1890–91. In 1891 he returned to Burton Wanderers. He was back at Notts County for season 1891–92 but only appeared once.

A somewhat misleading article in the local press in 1899 quoted Alf Shelton as referring to his brother Charlie 'Of blessed memory." Happily Charlie lived to the ripe old age of 87, so Alf must have been recalling his brothers' footballing skills, not his demise. Certainly Charlie was an outstanding footballer, a robust half–back with infectious enthusiasm, possessing sufficient stamina to carry him through the most gruelling match. His elder brother, Harry Shelton helped Nottingham Forest in the 1870s and became a referee in the early part of the 20th century.

At the end of his career Charles Shelton had made 24 appearances (20 League and four FA Cup) for Notts County and scored one goal.
