= Harry Jackson (footballer, born 1864) =

English footballer

Personal information
- Date of birth: 23 April 1864
- Place of birth: Nottingham, England
- Date of death: 29 May 1899 (aged 35)
- Place of death: Nottingham
- Position: Forward

Senior career*
Years	Team	Apps	(Gls)
1882–1883	Meadow Strollers		
1883–1884	Sneinton Wanderers		
1884–1890	Notts County	5	(3)
1890	Nottingham Forest		
- * Club domestic league appearances and goals

Harry Jackson (23 April 1864 – 29 May 1899) was an English footballer who played in The Football League for Notts County.

== Career ==
Harry Jackson was born in Nottingham on 23 April 1864. His first club were called Meadow Strollers and he signed for them in about 1882. He then moved to Sneinton Wanderers and he was with them until 1884. Signed for Notts County in 1884 and made his debut in March 1884. Made his first–team debut on 8 November 1884 in a FA Cup first round tie against Notts Olympic, County won 2–0. A prolific goal–scorer in Notts non–League years, with just six short of 100 goals in 123 recorded appearances, Harry Jackson was rightly dubbed "A goal–scoring wizard." In FA Cup matches also his total of 19 exceeded by some margin Tommy Lawton' 13 in the same competition, but when Notts became a Football League club in 1888–89 his star was on the wane.

Harry Jackson, playing as a winger, made his League debut on 22 September 1888 at Victoria Ground, the then home of Stoke. Notts County were defeated by the home team 3–0. Harry Jackson, playing at centre–forward, scored his League debut goal on 23 February 1889 at Dudley Road, the then home of Wolverhampton Wanderers. Harry Jackson scored the final goal of the match as Notts County lost to the home team 2–1. Harry Jackson appeared in five of the 22 League matches played by Notts County in season 1888–89 and scored three League goals. Harry Jackson playing as a forward/centre–forward (four appearances) played in a Notts County forward–line that scored three–League–goals–or–more twice.

Jackson was one of several locally born players who were allowed to move on as the County strengthened their ranks with an influx of top-class Scottish players. Jackson left in March 1890 and joined local rivals, Nottingham Forest He only played once for Forest and it was not a happy occasion. Forest were well beaten by Darwen 9–0. In his Notts County career Jackson appeared 26 times (21 League) and 19 goals (three League goals).
