= Albert Moore (footballer, born 1863) =

English footballer

Personal information
- Full name: Albert Edward Moore
- Date of birth: 15 September 1863
- Place of birth: Nottingham, England
- Date of death: 30 January 1939 (aged 75)
- Place of death: Wells, Somerset
- Position: Forward

Senior career*
Years	Team	Apps	(Gls)
1880–1882	St. Saviour's		
1882–1883	Nottingham Strollers		
1883–1889	Notts County	10	(3)
- * Club domestic league appearances and goals

Albert Edward Moore (15 September 1863 – 30 January 1939) was an English footballer who played in The Football League for Notts County.

== Early career ==
Albert Moore was born in Clyde Street, Nottingham on 15 September 1863 . He came to the attention of Notts County when he was in his late teens and signed for them during the Winter of 1882–1883. He made his debut in a friendly match against Sheffield on 6 February 1883. In the pre-Football League era Moore played 71 friendly matches, scoring 20 goals. He made his F.A. Cup debut on 24 January 1885 at The Chuckery, Walsall against Walsall Swifts. County won 4–1. In the pre-Football League era Moore played in 14 FA Cup ties scoring five goals, including a Hat-trick against Lincoln Ramblers on 15 October 1887.

== 1888–1889 season ==
Albert Moore, playing as a forward at inside right, made his League debut on his 25th birthday, 15 September 1888 at Anfield, the then home of Everton. Notts County lost to the home team 2–1 and Albert Moore scored the Notts County goal becoming the first Notts County player to score a League goal. Albert Moore appeared in 10 of the 22 League matches played by Notts County in season 1888–89 and scored three goals. As a forward (nine appearances as a forward) Moore played in a forward line that scored three–League–goals–or–more on four separate occasions.

== 1889 onwards ==
Employed in the hosiery warehouse of I. & R. Morley, Fletcher Gate, Nottingham, his manager, Mr Thomas Hill told him he must decide between football and business, so he gave up the game.

== Later life and death ==
He became a partner of a hosiery manufacturer, Dixon & Moore (Leicester). He died on 30 January 1939 at the home of his daughter in Wells, Somerset, and is buried at Welford Road Cemetery, Leicester.
