= Fred Weightman =

English footballer

Personal information
- Date of birth: 1863
- Place of birth: Newark-on-Trent, England
- Date of death: 1897 (aged 33–34)
- Position: Forward

Senior career*
Years	Team	Apps	(Gls)
1888	Notts County	1	(1)
- Nottingham Forest
- * Club domestic league appearances and goals

Fred Weightman (1863 – 1897) was an English footballer who played in The Football League for Notts County.
