= Harry Cursham =

English footballer and cricketer

Henry Cursham
Personal information
- Full name: Henry Alfred Cursham
- Date of birth: 27 November 1859
- Place of birth: Wilford, England
- Date of death: 6 August 1941 (aged 81)
- Place of death: Holme Pierrepont, England
- Position: Forward

Senior career*
Years	Team	Apps	(Gls)
1877–???	Notts County		
- Corinthian
- Grantham Town
- Thursday Wanderers
1888–1891	Notts County	9	(2)

International career
1880–1884	England	8	(5)
- * Club domestic league appearances and goals

Henry Alfred Cursham (27 November 1859 – 6 August 1941) was an English footballer and cricketer. He played football mostly for Notts County, with spells at Corinthian, Grantham Town and Thursday Wanderers. In cricket, he played two first class games for Nottinghamshire.

Cursham holds the individual goalscoring record for the FA Cup, with 49 goals in 44 games. He also played eight games for the England national football team, scoring five goals.

== Football career ==
Cursham was born in 1859 in Wilford, Nottinghamshire. He attended Repton School until age 18 and signed for Notts County in 1877. Cursham made his first team debut on 16 November 1878 in a 3–1 defeat by local rivals Nottingham Forest. The match was in the first round of the 1878-79 FA Cup, held at Trent Bridge, the home ground of Notts County at that time.

He became a regular in the Notts County team, frequently appearing alongside his brother, Arthur Cursham. His club career from 1877 to 1888 is not well recorded: all sources agree that he played mostly for Notts County with shorter spells at Corinthian, Grantham Town and Thursday Wanderers, but the dates that he played for each of these clubs are not clear. His FA Cup appearances are known, including scoring six goals for Notts County in a 11–1 win against Wednesbury Strollers in the second round of the 1881-82 FA Cup, held at Trent Bridge on 10 December 1881. He scored four against Basford Rovers in Notts County's 15–0 win (a record at the time) in the first round of the 1886-87 FA Cup on 30 October 1886 at Trent Bridge.

=== International career ===
Cursham was selected for the England national football team in 1880, making his international debut in a 3–2 victory over Wales. His first international goal came in his second match, a 13–0 win against Ireland in the 1881–82 season. He scored again in a 5–3 home loss to Wales, and a hat trick against Ireland on 23 February 1884; the latter was his final game for the national side. He finished his international career with eight caps and five goals.

=== Football League ===
The Football League was formed in 1888. Cursham made his first appearance in the new competition on 6 October 1888 at Trent Bridge, for Notts County in a 3–3 draw with Blackburn Rovers, playing at full back. He scored his first League goal on 12 January 1889, in County's 2–1 victory over West Bromwich Albion, this time playing as a centre forward. He appeared in eight of the 22 league matches played by Notts County that season, five at full back and three at centre forward, scoring twice. Cursham made one more league appearance in the 1890–91 season, ending his league career with nine appearances and two goals.

=== Final years and retirement ===
Cursham appeared in twice in the 1888-89 FA Cup, scoring one goal, then wrote to the Notts County board in January 1889 announcing his intention to retire. He did not play in the 1889–90 season, but returned in 1890–91 with two more first–team appearances, one in the league and one in the FA Cup, before retiring again.

He ended his career with an FA Cup record of 44 games and 49 goals over 12 seasons. As of 2018, this remains the highest number of goals scored by a player in the FA Cup.

Cursham was an advocate for and exponent of dribbling the ball. He was critical of the emphasis on passing tactics that emerged in the Combination Game, which became popular in the 1870s and 1880s. In 1904 he gave an interview to the Football Post, in which he stated that "Individual play was being too greatly sacrificed to the cry of combination."

== Cricket career ==
Cursham also played county cricket for Nottinghamshire, as a lower order batsman. His first class debut was in 1880, in a draw with Surrey. Business commitments (he was an insurance broker) prevented Cursham from taking up a career in cricket, which would have required a much greater time commitment than football. He made only one more appearance for Nottinghamshire, 24 years later in 1904 at the age of 44, against a touring South Africa team. His brother, Arthur Cursham was also a first class cricketer.

In the handling code, he was good enough to represent Nottinghamshire against Bedfordshire in February 1892.
