= Bob Jardine =

Scottish footballer

Personal information
- Date of birth: 27 February 1865
- Place of birth: Newcastle-upon-Tyne, England
- Date of death: 1941 (aged 75–76)
- Position: Forward

Senior career*
Years	Team	Apps	(Gls)
1886–1888	Glasgow Thistle		
1888	Halliwell		
1888–1889	Notts County	18	(9)
1889–1894	Heanor Town		
1889	Derby County	1	(1)
1889–1890	Nottingham Forest		
1890	Notts Rangers		
1890	Notts Waverley		
1891	Sheffield United		
1891	Mellors Limited		
1891–1892	Notts County Rovers		
1892	Grantham Rovers		
1893	Notts County		
1895	Mansfield Town		
- * Club domestic league appearances and goals

Robert J. Jardine (1864–1941) was a Scottish footballer who played in The Football League for Derby County and Notts County.

He is the first player to score five goals in a football league match when Notts County beat Burnley on 27 October 1888.

== Early career ==
Two sources state Jardine was born in the Glasgow/Partick area of Central Scotland, one source stating the birth year as 1864. Having consulted the National Records of Scotland archive there was a Robert Jardine born in Partick in 1864 but with no middle name. Another source states he was Robert Joseph and born in Newcastle upon Tyne in 1865 but, on the balance of evidence, Jardine had no middle name. A Robert Jardine was married in the Manchester area in 1887, and Jardine was playing for Halliwell in the 1887–1888 season. Halliwell is a suburb of Bolton. The Robert Jardine who got married had no middle name. Therefore, a reasonable conclusion is Jardine was born in Partick with no middle name but adopted a name, maybe Joseph, in adult life. So, back to football. Jardine, as previously stated, joined Halliwell and assisted them to reach the F.A. Cup third round for only the second time (the last time – the club ceased to exist after 1890). He signed for Notts County, probably in the summer of 1888, and became the first Scottish player to become a professional with a Nottingham club.

== 1888–1889 season ==
Jardine signed for Notts County in 1888, the month is unknown. Jardine, playing at centre–forward, made his Notts County and League debut on 15 September 1888 at Anfield, the then home of Everton. Notts County lost to the home team 2–1. Jardine scored his debut goal for Notts County and in the League on 6 October 1888. Playing as one of the winger' at Trent Bridge, the then home of Notts County, Jardine scored the second of three goals scored by the home team against Blackburn Rovers in a match that ended as a 3–3 draw. Jardine appeared in 18 of the 22 League matches played by Notts County in season 1888–89 and scored nine goals. As a forward and centre–forward (two appearances as centre–forward and eight appearances as a forward) Jardine played in a forward line that scored three–League–goals–or–more twice. As a winger (eight appearances) he played in a Notts County midfield that achieved a big (three–League–goals–in–a–match–or–more) win once. Jardine top–scored for Notts County with nine League goals in season 1888–89. Five of his nine goals came in one match.

== 1889 onwards ==
In June 1889 Jardine left Notts County and signed for Heanor Town. Heanor Town apparently were not in a League at that time. Jardine did not stay long as Derby County a local club in the Football League signed him, probably in the Autumn of 1889.

Jardine made his debut for Derby County and played his last Football League match and scored his last Football League goal on 19 October 1889 when Derby County pulled off a remarkable 2–1 victory over the defending Football League Champions|League Champions Preston North End. Jardine was either dropped or injured, it is not clear but before the end of 1889 he had left Derby County and signed for Nottingham Forest.

Jardine arrived at Nottingham Forest towards the end of 1889, midway through the club's campaign in the newly formed Football Alliance. However, sometime during the calendar year 1890, there are no records as to when, Jardine left and returned to Heanor Town.

Equally Jardine was at Heanor Town for a short time and he left before the end of the calendar year, 1890. At the beginning of season 1890-1891 Heanor Town became founder members of the Midland Amateur Alliance. There are no records of when Jardine joined or left Heanor Town for the second time so it can only be assumed that he may have played for Heanor Town in the new League. By the end of the year Jardine had left Heanor Town and joined Sheffield United.

Jardine joined Sheffield United in 1890 and it is reasonable to assume that he played for them in the Midland Counties League, a League they had joined in 1890. Sheffield United finished fifth in their new League but, once again, Jardine was on his way.

In 1891 Jardine left Sheffield United and joined Mellors Limited or, Mellors United. There appears to be no record of this team but this was the last team Jardine played for. There is no record when he retired.

== Life after football ==
Although Jardine was at Nottingham Forest for a short time he seemed to develop an affinity for the club even though his great achievements were made at Notts County. A source has revealed that when Jardine stopped playing he was employed at Nottingham Forest over a very long period of time.

On 11 December 1937 a journalist working for the Football Post reported seeing Jardine in the crowd at Meadow Lane, Nottingham, when Notts County were playing Northampton Town. The Post recalled his great achievement of scoring five in one match.

Jardine died on 30 July 1941 in Basford. He was aged 76/77.
