= Notts Rangers F.C. =

English former football club, based in Nottingham

Notts Rangers
- Full name: Nottingham Rangers Football Club
- Nickname: the Bleaters
- Founded: 1868
- Dissolved: 1890
- Ground: Castle/Meadow Lane
- Secretary: H. C. Shelton
1884–86 colours	1886–90 colours

Notts Rangers Football Club was an English football club, founded in 1868 under the name Nottingham St James. They became Nottingham Rangers in 1880 and by 1886 were habitually referred to as Notts Rangers.

== History ==
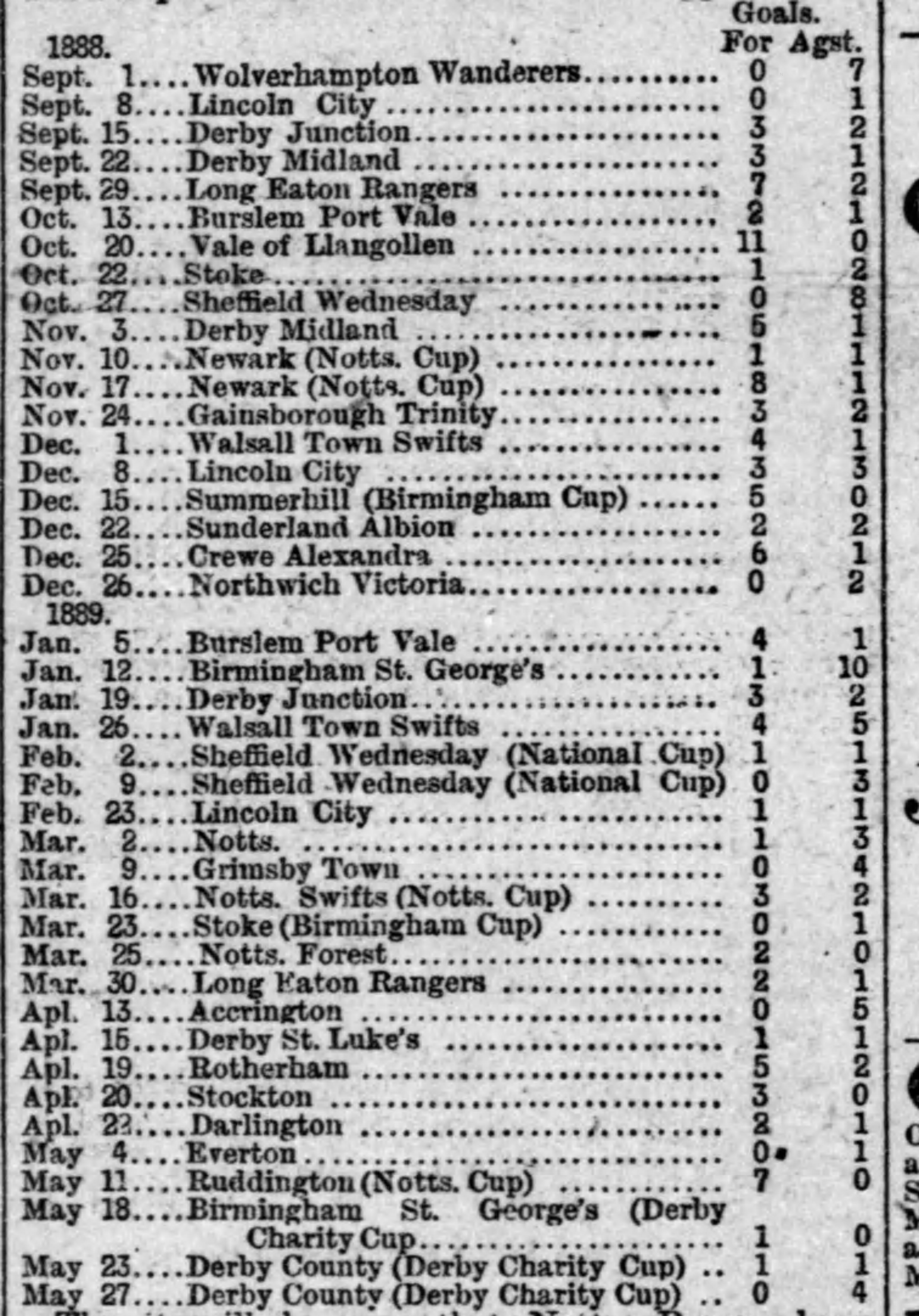
Notts Rangers results, season 1888–89

The club claimed a foundation date of 1868, although it is only known to have played other clubs from 1876.

The club was a founder member of the Midland Football League and participated in the FA Cup in 1885–86 to 1889–90. The club's first FA Cup campaign ended in acrimony, with the Rangers' half-back Knight suspended for the season for insulting the umpire after the loss to Notts County.

The club's best run in the Cup was in 1887–88, which also saw the club's best FA Cup win, 10–1 over Jardines before a crowd of 2,000. The club had previously recorded a 14–0 win over Castle Rovers in the fourth round of the Notts Cup in 1885–86.

The Football Association awarded the club one of the 16 slots for those exempt from the newly introduced qualifying rounds in the 1888–89 FA Cup, on the basis of its Notts Cup successes, even though Notts County had been included in the initial Football League, and some considered that a snub to the League; certainly the footballing public did not think Rangers a suitable club for the honour, a newspaper poll on the issue only ranking the club 31st. Rangers could not take advantage, losing 3–0 in a first round replay at The Wednesday, all of the goals coming in the second half.

That season Rangers was a founder member of the Combination, and completed its required 16 games with a record of 11 wins, 1 draw, and 2 defeats, with a goal record of 47 for and 28 against; this was especially strong given the club only played 6 games at its Meadow Lane home. Of the clubs that played the full complement of 16 games, the Rangers had the best record, although Newton Heath had 1 point fewer from 14 games. The biggest win was a 7–2 home victory over Long Eaton Rangers. The club also won the Nottingham Senior Cup twice, although after the introduction of professionalism this was not a competition of great prestige (the runners-up both times was the obscure Ruddington side).

There were however ominous signs as the club was struggling to attract decent crowds (even the 1887–88 Notts Cup semi-final with Mellors had a mere 600 in attendance) and, with two bigger, older, and more prestigious clubs in the town, the Rangers did not apply to join the new Football Alliance, instead joining the Midland League for 1889–90. As Notts County was playing in the League and Nottingham Forest in the Alliance, the Midland League was a definite third choice; the Rangers lost a number of players (plus secretary Shelton), and the support, never high, dwindled to almost nothing. The club won once in 15 matches, lost 7–2 at home to Lincoln City in an FA Cup qualifying round match, and was unable to complete the season, its last match being a 1–0 home defeat to Rotherham Town. By 31 May 1890, the club had ceased to exist.

=== Successor club ===
A new club started with the same name soon afterwards, but played junior football at a low level. The second club's final season was 1913–14, in which the club finished 11th out of 14 in the Nottinghamshire Football Alliance, two places above Notts Olympic.

== Colours ==
The club originally played in white, changing to pale blue and cardinal by 1884. In 1886 the club changed to black and white stripes (at which time Notts County were still wearing chocolate and blue).

== Ground ==
The club originally played on the Meadows, finding a more permanent home at the Castle Ground by 1884. In September 1886 the club moved to Meadow Lane (formerly the home of Sneinton Rovers).

== Famous players ==
- Charlie Shelton, brother of club secretary Harry, was the club's only England international player, earning one cap in 1888.
- Fred Geary, future League champion with Everton.
- Albert Smith, England international.
- Alfred Shelton, who would go on to earn international honours whilst playing for Notts County.

== Honours ==
Nottinghamshire Senior Cup:

- Winners: 1887–88, 1888–89
- Runners-up: 1885–86

Derby County Charity Cup:

- Runners-up: 1887–88, 1888–89
