= Harry Daft =

English sportsman (1866–1945)

Harry Butler Daft (5 April 1866 – 12 January 1945) was an English footballer who played for Notts County, with whom he won the FA Cup in 1894, as well as making five appearances as a left winger for the national side. He was also an accomplished first-class cricketer, playing 200 matches for Nottinghamshire between 1885 and 1899.

== Football career ==
Harry Daft
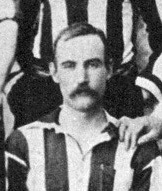
- Daft with Notts County in 1894.

Personal information
- Full name: Harry Butler Daft
- Date of birth: 5 April 1866
- Place of birth: Radcliffe-on-Trent, England
- Date of death: 12 January 1945 (aged 78)
- Place of death: High Cross, Hertfordshire
- Position: Outside left

Senior career*
Years	Team	Apps	(Gls)
1885–1886	Notts County		
1886–1887	Nottingham Forest		
1887–1888	Newark Town		
1888	Corinthian		
1888–1889	Notts County	19	(8)
1889	Corinthian		
1889–1892	Notts County	82	(39)
1893	Nottingham Forest	4	(1)
1893–1894	Notts County	36	(11)
1895	Newark Town		

International career
1889–1892	England	5	(3)
- * Club domestic league appearances and goals

He was the youngest son of Richard Daft (Nottinghamshire County Cricket Club 1858–1891), brother of Richard Parr Daft (Nottinghamshire C.C.C. 1886), nephew of Charles Frederick Daft (Nottinghamshire C.C.C. 1862–64) and cousin to H.C. Daft, the champion hurdle racer. In addition to his England football caps, he played in 190 matches for Nottinghamshire C.C.C. and represented the Gentlemen against the Players. Additionally, he was no mean exponent of the game of lacrosse, having represented the North against the South, and at the age of 20 was a reserve for England. As a footballer he was noted for his great speed, clever centres and ability as an goalscorer.

Daft signed for Notts County in March 1885, but travelled around before the Football League era started. He went to Nottingham Forest in 1886, Newark Town in 1887 and Corinthian in the early part of 1888. He was back with Notts County when the Football League era commenced in September 1888. Harry Daft, playing as a forward, made his League debut on 22 September 1888 at Victoria Ground, the then home of Stoke. Notts County were defeated 3–0

Daft, playing as a forward, scored his debut League goal on 6 October 1888 at Trent Bridge, the then home of Notts County. Harry Daft scored the opening goal against visitors, Blackburn Rovers. The match ended as a 3–3 draw. Harry Daft appeared in 19 of the 22 League matches played by Notts County in season 1888–89 and top–scored with eight League goals. Harry Daft, playing as a forward/centre–forward (17 appearances) played in a Notts County forward–line that scored three–League–goals–or–more on six separate occasions.

Daft made his first appearance for England on 2 March 1889 against Ireland. England won the match "quite comfortably" 6–1, with John Yates scoring a hat trick.

1890–91 saw a considerable improvement in County's form, and they finished the league in third place. Daft only missed one league appearance, scoring six goals. His two goals against Burnley in the FA Cup helped County reach the final against Blackburn Rovers. In the final itself, played at the Kennington Oval on 21 March 1891, County were "a little overawed by the great occasion and especially by the FA Cup experience of Blackburn" who won 3–1.

Two weeks before the FA Cup Final, Daft played his fourth international match, against Ireland on 7 March 1891. Daft played at outside left and was amongst the scorers as England again won 6–1. This match was Tinsley Lindley's final appearance for England, and he marked the occasion with two goals.

In the 1891–92 league season, he missed only two matches scoring 13 goals as County finished the season eighth in the table. At the end of the season he was selected for what was to be his final appearance for England. In the match against Ireland Daft played at inside left and was awarded the captaincy of a team that comprised only professionals, five of whom were making their international debuts. Daft marked the occasion by scoring twice, either side of half-time, as England won 2–0.

An invaluable servant to the Notts club who, in 1893, was said to be the one remaining link connecting the present "Notts Incorporated" with the old Notts club. In January 1893 he was sensationally dismissed after he had declined to travel to Scotland for the New year tour on account of a foot injury. He was quickly snapped up by Nottingham Forest, but donned the scarlet jersey on only four occasions (scoring one League goal), one of his appearances being against the Magpies on 25 February 1893, at the Town Ground, Forest winning 3–1. Much to the relief of the Trent Bridge faithful, the rift was healed in the close season and Daft returned to the Magpies.

In the Cup, County overcame three Division One teams to make it to the final. Burnley were defeated 1–0 in Round One at home. Subsequently, non-league Burton Wanderers were beaten 2–1 at Burton. In Round Three, there was a derby against local rivals Nottingham Forest with County managing a 1–1 draw away from home before easily defeating their archrivals 4–1 in the replay to claim a place in the Semi-Final against Blackburn Rovers. In the semi-final, held at Bramall Lane, Rovers were odds-on favourites to win; County, however, managed a 1–0 victory with Daft scoring the only goal of the game.

The 1894 FA Cup Final was played at Everton's Goodison Park against Bolton Wanderers, who had spent most of the season struggling near the foot of the First Division. Bolton fielded an under-strength side as a result of injuries to several key players, with others playing in less than full health, whereas County were able to field a full strength side. County soon took the lead and by half-time were 2–0 up with goals from Arthur Watson and James Logan. Logan's goal followed "some excellent wing play from Daft". Logan scored twice more in the second half and ran out 4–1 victors, thus becoming the first team from Division Two to win the cup.

When Harry Daft left Notts County and returned to Newark Town in 1895, he had made 179 appearances for Notts County (137 in the League and 36 in the FA Cup) scoring 81 goals (58 in the League and 20 in the FA Cup.

As well as his success at football, Daft was an accomplished cricketer and was also selected as a reserve for the England lacrosse team.

== Cricket career ==
Harry Daft
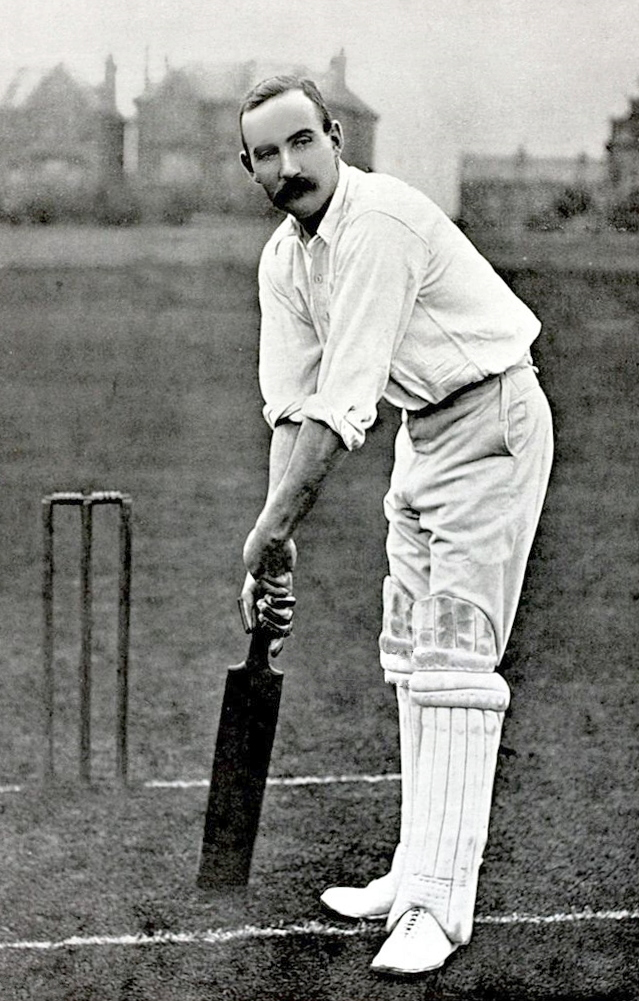
- Daft photographed in around 1896

Cricket information
- Batting: Right-handed
- Bowling: Slow

Career statistics
Competition	First-class
Matches	200
Runs scored	4,370
Batting average	15.89
100s/50s	0/17
Top score	92*
Balls bowled	4,881
Wickets	86
Bowling average	26.03
5 wickets in innings	1
10 wickets in match	0
Best bowling	5/79
Catches/stumpings	81/–
- Source: CricketArchive, 10 April 2023

Harry Daft was the second son of Richard Daft, who was one of the best batsmen of his day. At Trent College he played for the college XI when only 12 and showed such increased skill as he played with his seniors that in 1885, when 19, he was tried for Nottinghamshire in several games. He made his first-class debut on 28 May 1885 against Marylebone Cricket Club and was top scorer for the county, making 23 in the first innings before being bowled by W. G. Grace. He made his County Championship debut at Yorkshire on 29 June and went on to play in five championship matches that season.

The next season, he appeared for Gentlemen v. Players at the Oval and he assisted Nottinghamshire as an amateur until he turned professional in 1890. According to his obituary in Wisden, he was "especially strong in defence, with skill in placing his strokes, he never suggested forcing ability and scarcely reached the high standard of his county's best batsmen". In August 1891, he played with his father in the county eleven, at Kennington Oval against Surrey. Richard Daft had returned to the Nottinghamshire side after an absence of ten years because Arthur Shrewsbury was forced to stand down through injury. Neither father nor son made any particular impact in this game, with Harry scoring 5 and 0, and his father 12 and 2 as Surrey won by an innings and 46 runs.

His best season with the bat was in 1894 when he totalled 596 runs at an average of 19.22. He achieved his first-class top score at the end of August against Kent at Trent Bridge with 92 not out. Against Surrey at The Oval in August 1896 he carried his bat through the second innings for 77 in a vain attempt to save his side from defeat. His best bowling figures of 5-79 came in the County Championship match against Kent at Mote Park, Maidstone in July.

== Works cited ==
- Gibbons, Philip (2001). Association Football in Victorian England – A History of the Game from 1863 to 1900. Upfront Publishing. ISBN 1-84426-035-6.
