= Bhambatha (disambiguation) =

Bhambatha (c. 1860–1906?) was a Zulu chief of the amaZondi clan in the Colony of Natal.

Bhambatha may also refer to:

  - Bambatha Rebellion, a Zulu revolt against British rule and taxation in the Colony of Natal, South Africa, in 1906
- Bhambatha, a 2004 album by Zola 7
- Bambata (musical project), a music project in South Africa
