= The Black Door =

South African TV drama series

- Genre: Adult drama telenovela
- Created by: Mandla N Mpumelelo Nhlapo
- Directed by: Mandla N
- Theme music composer: Busta 929 and Boohle
- Opening theme: "Ngixolele"
- Country of origin: South Africa
- No. of seasons: 1

Production
- Executive producers: Mandla N Mpumelelo Nhlapo; Annelle van Rooyen
- Camera setup: Multi-camera
- Running time: 22-24 minutes
- Production company: BlackBrain Pictures

Original release
- Network: e.tv
- Release: 11 April 2022

Related
- Isitha: The Enemy

The Black Door is a South African television drama series created by Mandla N and Mpumelelo Nhlapho. It is an e.tv original production produced by Blackbrain Pictures for e.tv. The series stars Linda Sebezo, Zamani Mbatha, Velephi Mnisi, and Gabisile Tshabalala, among others.

== Plot ==
The series focuses on Khaya (Zamani Mbatha), a long-distance truck driver who has a dream of owning a bus driving business with his brother, Chuma (Thobani Nzuza). During the day, Chuma is a deacon at church, and at night, he works as a sex worker at The Black Door, an exclusive adult-entertainment brothel. When Khaya learns of his brother's death at the hands of the owner of The Black Door club, Rebecca (Linda Sebezo) over stolen money that was supposed to be delivered, Khaya is forced to join the world of sex, drugs and dodgy dealings to repay the millions his late brother stole.

Mandla N, one of the executive directors of the series, describes it as more than just full-frontal sex and nudity and says it tells a story of sex workers and their daily lives. The series aims to bring awareness and break stigmas about the profession.

== Cast ==
- Linda Sebezo as Rebecca Mabuza
- Zamani Mbatha as Khaya Sokhulu
- Velephi Mnisi as Nomsa Sokhulu
- Sello Ramolahloane as Bra Gibbs
- Gabisile Tshabalala as Boniswa
- Kere Nyawo as Stej
- Sandile Dlamini as Mvubu
- Bhekumuzi Mkwanazi as Bra Kenny
- Thobani Nzuza as Chuma Sokhulu
- Mzamo Gcabashe as Romeo
- Sibonginkosi Tenza as Nandi Mkhize
- Sthembiso SK Khoza as Sabelo Cele
- Mzikayise Makroti as Nkanyiso
- Oscar Mgudlwa as Jupiter
- Nonkululeko Mbatha as Thenjiwe Sokhulu
- Sibulele Ntlebi as Nolitha Sokhulu
- Siphiwe Nkosi as Frans Mkhize
- Thobani Nzuza as Chuma Sokhulu
- Nolwazi Kweyama as Enhle Mvubu

== Production ==
Filming began in February 2022, and although the series is based in Mpumalanga, it was filmed on a farm in Honeydew, outside Johannesburg. The entire set was built from scratch in six weeks. Executive director of the series, Mpumelelo Nhlapho, says that they wanted the sets to feel authentic, and open up the world, adding to the cinematic feel of the series, and also making for more playing areas in their style of filming as compared to the traditional style of telenovelas, which are mostly shot in a studio.

== Broadcast ==
The series premiered on 11 April 2022 on e.tv, with late night reruns on eXposed. The series was also added to the streaming service eVOD.

== Reception ==
According to the Broadcasting Research Council's TAMS review, during its run the series reached over 2 million viewers, slightly lower than the viewership figures for its timeslot, which previously displayed e.tv telenovela Imbewu: The Seed. Despite this, it became the third most watched series on the channel. The series received mixed reviews from viewers, with some complaining on the series being too early for primetime viewing, and questioning whether e.tv had unsigned the Broadcasting Complaints Commission of South Africa's Code of Conduct.

== Spin-off series ==
=== Isitha: The Enemy ===
In April 2023, e.tv and BlackBrain Pictures announced that a new spinoff series, titled Isitha: The Enemy. The series continues from the events of The Black Door and follows the Sokhulu family and the return of Chuma. The starring cast of The Black Door, including Thobani Nzuza reprise their roles, with Dawn Thandeka King, Lindani Nkosi and Khanyisani Keswa being part of the cast. The series is currently on its second season.
