= Abashokobezi 1906–2006 =

Studio album by Bambata
- Released: 2006
- Genre: Zulu Maskandi and South African jazz
- Length: 71" 22'
- Label: Gallo Record Company
- Producer: Malambule, Jabu Khanyile

Bambata chronology
ukhandampondo (poll tax) (2002)	Abashokobezi 1906–2006 (2006)

Abashokobezi (1906–2006) is the third and so far final album by the South African music project Bambata, released in 2006, to commemorate the centennial of the Bambatha rebellion of 1906.

The title Abashokobezi refers to Zulu leaders who were involved in a Zulu civil war after the Zulu kingdom was divided into 13 chiefdoms whose chiefs were appointed by the British administration, in the wake of the Battle of Ulundi in 1879. The word abashokobezi (sing. umshokobezi) is derived from the name of an Usuthu war badge, ubushokobezi. The meaning of the word shifted from ‘adherents of the Usuthu faction’ to ‘rebels’ during the Zulu Civil War of 1879–84.

This album sees the Bambata music project move more to the direction of a band effort. The key figures on this album are Mzala Zuma, Philangezwi Bongani Nkwanyana, and the new addition to the ranks of Bambata musicians, vocalist Faca Kulu.

In anticipation of an Afro-World Sessions concert at Newtown Music Hall in Johannesburg, South Africa in 2004, Artslink of South Africa wrote about the album as follows:

Now, on the eve of the centenary of the Bhambatha Rebellion, this album pays tribute to the ever-living memory of an original South African freedom fighter, Chief Bambata of the Zondi tribe, whose dedication to freedom and preservation of dignity for his people led to his ultimate demise. A celebratory album, Abashokobezi, which is a precursor to the Bhambatha Rebellion Centenary Celebrations planned for 2006, is a faithful and authentic representation of the principles he fought so strongly for in 1906 against Poll Tax [… …] The movement continues, and gathers strength — musically and culturally, keeping the image, ideals and legacy of Chief Bhambatha alive and ensuring that his contribution to the liberation of South Africa will never be forgotten. By extension, Bambata should be positioned as a group who are defined as a collective and who use musical expressions as a way to articulate the significance of certain historical events and the impact on society.

The Swedish newspaper Svenska Dagbladet published a short review of this album in 2005:

An incredibly pretentious album to judge by the title and what can be read about it. If, like me, you lack knowledge of most African languages, this is still pop and jazzy zuluhiphop with some traditional instruments. Surprisingly good even without story.

== Track listing ==
1. Voman’ emadlozini (re-arranged by Philangezwi Bongani Nkwanyana, Sipho Sithole)

- Performed by Philangezwi Bongani Nkwanyana, featuring Phindile Mkhize, King Prophet and Faca Kulu
- Keyboards: Sipho Ngwane
- Percussion: Tlale Makhene

2. Abashokobezi (A Tribute to Unsung Heroes 1906–2006) (Sipho Sithole)

- Performed by Faca Kulu and Philangezwi Bongani Nkwanyana
- Percussion: Tlale Makhene

3. Emanzini (A Tribute to the King) (Marvin Moses)

- Featuring Mangethe (Praise Poetry), Tlale Makehne (split voice),
- Trumpet: Mthandazeni Dumakude
- Izimpempe (whistles): Malambule

4. Ngicel’ amandla (Philangezwi Bongani Nkwanyana, Sipho Sithole, Jabu Khanyile)

- Performed by Philangezwi Bongani Nkwanyana, featuring Mzala
- Percussion: Tlale Makhene

5. Mbali (re-arranged by Mthandeni Mvelase, Henry B Kulu, Sipho Sithole, Jabu Khanyile)

- Performed by Faca Kulu
- Percussion: Tlale Makhene

6. Shomi yami (Maxhegwana Johannes Zuma)

- Performed by Mzala, featuring Philangezwi Bongani Nkwanyana and Faca Kulu
- Chorus by Philangezwi Bongani Nkwanyana and Faca Kulu

7. Ubhememe (Philangezwi Bongani Nkwanyana)

- Performed by Philangezwi Bongani Nkwanyana
- Percussion: Tlale Makhene
- Flute solo: Kelly Petlane

8. Ishixakaxaka (Maxhegwana Johannes Zuma, Sipho Sithole, Jabu Khanyile)

- Performed by Mzala, Faca Kulu and Philangezwi Bongani Nkwanyana

9. Ukufa kugehlule (Philangezwi Bongani Nkwanyana)

- Performed by Philangezwi Bongani Nkwanyana
- Flute solo: Kelly Petlane

10. Saphel’ isizwe (Henry B Kulu, Jabu Khanyile, Mthandeni Mvelase, Sipho Sithole)

- Performed by Faca Kulu and Philangezwi Bongani Nkwanyana
- Percussion: Tlale Makhene
- Trumpet solo: Madwe Nako

11. Sishiman’ ushela kanjani (Sipho Sithole)

- Featuring praises by Tshat’ Ugodo, Faca Kulu, Mzala Zuma, Philangezwi Bongani Nkwanyana and Malambule

12. Mshana wami (Maxhegwana Johannes Zuma, Jabu Khanyile)

- Performed by Mzala Zuma, featuring Faca Kulu

13. Wena we zulu! Bayethe (Trad., arranged by Thembinkosi Zwane)

- Performed by Mangethe

== Musicians ==
- Keyboards: Mthandeni Mvelase (except track 2)
- Bass: Fana Zulu
- Drums: Isaac ‘Mnca’ Mtshali
- Brass section (tracks 1, 2, 4, 5, 7, 10)
  - Kelly Petlane (Soprano sax)
  - Khaya Dlamini (Tenor sax)
  - Madwe Nako (Trumpet)
- Izimpempe (whistles): Malambule (tracks 3, 4)
- Background vocals: Deborah Fraser, Khululiwe Sithole, Khanyo Maphumulo (tracks 2, 4, 5, 6, 7, 8, 10, 12)
- Extra vocals: Bongani, Faca, Malambule

== Production credits ==
- Produced by: Malambule (all tracks), Jabu Khanyile (tracks 1, 2, 4, 5, 7, 10)
- Additional producing: Mthandeni Mvelase (preproduction, except tracks 2, 3); Marvin Moses (track 3), Nicky Blumenfeld (track 1)
- Assistant producers: Philangezwi Bongani Nkwanyana and Marvin Moses
- Executive producer: Malambule
- Engineer: Marvin Moses
- Extra Programming: Mthandeni Mvelase (except tracks 2, 3)
- Other Programming: Sipho Ngwane (track 2)
- Recorded and mixed at Downtown Studios (studio 2)
- Mixed at Downtown Studios by Dave Segal
- Sleeve design: Chevron Creative Consulting
- Project management: Native Rhythm Productions
