= 1906 (album) =

Studio album by Bambata
- Released: 2000
- Genre: Zulu Maskandi and Afro Jazz
- Length: 72:13
- Label: Gallo Record Company
- Producer: Jabu Khanyile & Sipho Sithole

Bambata chronology
1906 (2000)	ukhandampondo (poll tax) (2002)

1906 is the first album by South African music project Bambata. The name of the album refers to the Zulu rebellion against the English in the Colony of Natal (modern Kwazulu-Natal) in 1906, led by Chief Bambatha kaMancinza (ca. 1860–1906?). The Zulu rebelled against a poll tax introduced by the English.

The album was a result of collaboration between Sipho Sithole, director and founder of the Native Rhythms Productions, Philangezwi Bongani Nkwanyana, Mathufela Zuma and Bheki Khoza.

1906 was nominated for three categories in the South African Music Awards 2001:

- Best Newcomer
- Best Zulu Music and
- Best Adult Contemporary Album: African.

Sipho Sithole was also nominated for Best Producer.

== Track listing ==
Adapted from the liner notes.

1. 1906 (Philangezwi Bongani Nkwanyana)

- Bongani Nkwanyana, lead vocals, Maskandi guitar
- Phuzekhemisi, guest vocals and Maskandi guitar
- Bhezi Khoza, acoustic guitar
- Mandla Zikalala, bass guitar
- Mthandeni Mvelase, keyboards
- Kwazi Shange, drums
- Godfrey Mgcina, percussion

2. Uzondo (Maxhegwana Johannes Zuma)

- Mathufel Zuma, lead vocals, Maskandi guitar
- Johnny Chonco, acoustic and electric guitars
- Mandla Zikalala, bass guitar
- Mthandeni Mvelase, keyboards
- Kwazi Shange, drums
- Godfrey Mgcina, percussion

3. Ijele (Sipho Sithole)

- Sipho Sithole, lead vocals
- Bhezi Khoza, acoustic guitar
- Johnny Chonco, acoustic and electric guitars
- Mandla Zikalala, bass guitar
- Kwazi Shange, drums
- Godfrey Mgcina, percussion

4. Izinkomo Zamalobolo (Philangezwi Bongani Nkwanyana)

- Bongani Nkwanyana, vocals, Maskandi guitar
- Khululiwe Stihole, guest vocals
- Bhezi Khoza, acoustic guitar
- Mandla Zikalala, bass guitar
- Mthandeni Mvelase, keyboards
- Kwazi Shange, drums
- Godfrey Mgcina, percussion

5. Amavumantombi (Maxhegwana Johannes Zuma)

- Bongani Nkwanyana, lead vocals, Maskandi guitar
- Mathufel Zuma, lead vocals, Maskandi guitar
- Bhezi Khoza, acoustic guitar
- Mandla Zikalala, bass guitar
- Mthandeni Mvelase, keyboards
- Kwazi Shange, drums
- Godfrey Mgcina, percussion
- Steve Dryer, brass

6. Isandundundu (Philangezwi Bongani Nkwanyana)

- Bongani Nkwanyana, vocals, Maskandi guitar
- Sipho Sithole, praise poet
- Bhezi Khoza, acoustic guitar
- Herbie Tsoaeli, bass guitar
- Mthandeni Mvelase, keyboards
- Lulu Gontsana, drums
- Tlale Makhene, percussion
- Steve Dryer, brass

7. Amadlozi (Philangezwi Bongani Nkwanyana)

- Bhezi Khoza, acoustic guitar
- Johnny Chonco, acoustic and electric guitars
- Mandla Zikalala, bass guitar
- Mthandeni Mvelase, keyboards
- Kwazi Shange, drums
- Godfrey Mgcina, percussion

8. Ushaka (Bheki Khoza)

- Bhezi Khoza, lead vocals, acoustic guitar
- Mandla Zikalala, bass guitar
- Mthandeni Mvelase, keyboards
- Kwazi Shange, drums
- Godfrey Mgcina, percussion
- Steve Dryer, brass

9. Uyagaqa (Maxhegwana Johannes Zuma)

- Mathufel Zuma, lead vocals, Maskandi guitar
- Bhezi Khoza, acoustic guitar
- Mandla Zikalala, bass guitar
- Mthandeni Mvelase, keyboards
- Lulu Gontsana, drums
- Godfrey Mgcina and Tlale Makhene, percussion

10. Usathane (Philangezwi Bongani Nkwanyana)

- Bongani Nkwanyana, lead vocals, Maskandi guitar
- Sipho Sithole, praise poet
- Bhezi Khoza, acoustic guitar
- Herbie Tsoaeli, bass guitar
- Mthandeni Mvelase, keyboards
- Lulu Gontsana, drums
- Godfrey Mgcina and Tlale Makhene, percussion

11. Umziwenduna (Maxhegwana Johannes Zuma)

- Mathufel Zuma, lead vocals, Maskandi guitar
- Bhezi Khoza, acoustic guitar
- Herbie Tsoaeli, bass guitar
- Mthandeni Mvelase, keyboards
- Kwazi Shange, drums
- Godfrey Mgcina, percussion

12. Amahangula (Philangezwi Bongani Nkwanyana)

- Bongani Nkwanyana, lead vocals, Maskandi guitar
- Bhezi Khoza, acoustic guitar
- Mandla Zikalala, bass guitar
- Mthandeni Mvelase, keyboards
- Lulu Gontsana, drums
- Godfrey Mgcina and Tlale Makhene, percussion
- Steve Dryer, brass
- Vocals on all tracks:
  - Khululiwe Sithole
  - Maxwell Mntambo
  - Morris Mbongwa
  - Deborah Fraser
  - Khanyo Maphumulu

== Production ==
Adapted from the liner notes.

- Produced by: Jabu Khanyile & Sipho Sithole
- Engineer: Jasper Williams
- Mixing: Adrian Hamilton
- Mastering: Peter Pearlson at Forest Studios
- Recorded and mixed at Downtown Studios
- Original artwork: Fikile Magalela
- Sleeve design: Derick Taljaard
- Project Management: Native Rhythm Productions
