= Ukhandampondo (poll tax) =

ukhandampondo (poll tax)

Studio album by Bambata
- Released: 2002
- Genre: Zulu Maskandi and Afro Jazz
- Length: 52" 53'
- Label: Gallo Record Company
- Producer: Jabu Khanyile & Sipho Sithole

Bambata chronology
1906 (2000)	ukhandampondo (poll tax) (2002)	Abashokobezi 1906–2006 (2006)

ukhandampondo (poll tax) is the second album by the South African music project Bambata, released in 2002. It continues on the themes of the first album 1906, focusing on the year 1906 and the Bambatha rebellion against English and the poll tax the latter had created.

The album was nominated for the Best Zulu Music Album in the 9th South African Music Awards in 2003.

== Track listing ==
1. "Ucijimpi" (Philangezwi Bongani Nkwanyana), arr. Mandla Zikalala
  - Lead vocals Philangezwi Bongani Nkwanyana
2. "ukhandampondo" (Philangezwi Bongani Nkwanyana), arr. Mthandeni Mvelase
  - Lead vocals Philangezwi Bongani Nkwanyana
3. "Epalamende" (Maxhegwana Johannes Zuma), arr. Jabu Khanyile
  - Lead vocals Maxhegwana Johannes Zuma
4. "Uyindlondlo" (Maxhegwana Johannes Zuma)
  - Lead vocals Maxhegwana Johannes Zuma
5. "Isinqawunqawu" (Philangezwi Bongani Nkwanyana), arr. Mandla Zikalala & Mthandeni Mvelase
  - Lead vocals Philangezwi Bongani Nkwanyana
6. "Bayizizwe" (Philangezwi Bongani Nkwanyana), arr. Mandla Zikalala
  - Lead vocals Philangezwi Bongani Nkwanyana
7. "Uthando" (Philangezwi Bongani Nkwanyana)
  - Lead vocals Philangezwi Bongani Nkwanyana
8. "Umalume" (Maxhegwana Johannes Zuma), arr. Mthandeni Mvelase & Philangezwi Bongani Nkwanyana
  - Lead vocals Maxhegwana Johannes Zuma
9. "Icala" (Maxhegwana Johannes Zuma)
  - Lead vocals Maxhegwana Johannes Zuma
10. "Ekuphakameni" (Sipho Sithole), arr. Sipho Sithole, Mthandeni Mvelase & . Mandla Zikalala
  - Lead vocals Sipho Sithole
11. "Bayizizwe" (Rudeboy Mix) (Philangezwi Bongani Nkwanyana)
  - Lead vocals Philangezwi Bongani Nkwanyana
  - Guest rap: Rude Boy Paul

== Musicians ==
- Maskandi guitar: Mzala Zuma, Philangezwi Bongani Nkwanyana
- Acoustic guitar: Ntokozo Zungu, Bheki Khoza
- Keyboards: Mthandeni Mvelase
- Saxophone: Khaya Dlamini
- Bass guitar: Mandla Zikalala
- Drums: Kwazi Shange
  - Drums on track 7: Nkanyezi Cele
- Percussion: Bassy Mahlasela
- Horns: Shembe Traditional Horns (Izimbomu): Mqhawuleni Khanyile & Mathambo Nzuza

== Production credits ==
- Produced by: Jabu Khanyile & Sipho Sithole
- Assistant producer: Mthandeni Mvelase
- Executive producer: Sipho Sithole
- Assistant executive producer: Philangezwi Bongani Nkwanyana
- Recorded and mixed at Downtown Studios
- Engineer: Ray Mavundla
- Programming engineer: Mthandeni Mvelase
- Mixing: Peter Pearlson, except tracks 10 and 11: Marvin Moses
- Mastering: Peter Pearlson at Forest Studios
- Sleeve design: Candice Blignaut
- Project Management: Native Rhythm Productions
