= Zondi =

Zondi is a surname of several South African politicians.

== People with the surname ==
- Dumisani Zondi (born 1957) is a South African judge
- Eddie Zondi (1967–2014) was a South African radio personality
- Mbongeleni Zondi (1969–2009) was a Zulu chief
- Mthenjwa Zondi (born 1966) is a South African politician
- Musa Zondi (born 1960) is a South African politician
- Sphesihle Zondi (born 1995) is a South African politician
- Xoli Zondi (born 1983) is a South African actress and model

== See also ==
- Kramer and Zondi
- Zondo
