= Black Gold (South African TV series) =

- Genre: Telenovela
- Created by: Mandla N, and Mpumelelo Nhlapo
- Written by: Eddie Thaba; Bakang Sebatjane; Donald Ndlovu; Sweety Ntshangase, Wilson Shaddai; Elelwani Netshifhire; Makanaka Mavengere; Veronica Nkosana, Kgomotso Aphane; Mashadi Florence Rapeu; Tsale Makam; Mpo Osei-Tutu; Nokuphiwa Magubane; Oratile Mogoje; Seabela Maila
- Starring: Nomalanga Shozi; Dawn Thandeka King; Sello Maake Ka-Ncube; Zamani Mbatha; Mbali Ngiba; Siphesihle Vazi; Ernest Ndlovu; Nomsa Buthelezi; Thulani Mtsweni; Lwazi Dlamini; Warren Masemola; Sweet Guluva
- Theme music composer: Bongo Roit
- Composers: Black Brain Pictures; Jamele J Ross; Senzo Afrika; Kurt Slabbert; Henwood; Bongo Riot; Mlindo the Vocalist
- Country of origin: South Africa
- Original languages: English; Zulu
- No. of seasons: 1

Production
- Executive producers: Mandla N; Mpumelelo Nhlapo; Annelie van Rooyen
- Producers: Mandla N; Mpumelelo Nhlapo
- Camera setup: Multi-camera
- Running time: 22-24 minutes
- Production company: Black Brain Pictures

Original release
- Network: BET Africa
- Release: 17 August – 26 December 2025

Black Gold is a South African television drama series created by Mandla N and Mpumelelo Nhlapo. It is a BET original series produced by BlackBrain Pictures. The series is the channel's 5th South African telenovela. GQ reviews express explore of power, betrayal, and bloodlines in a gripping telenovela.

On 4 November 2025, it was announced that filming for Black Gold had been completed, as Paramount's African offices were closing in December 2025.

== Cast ==
Actor/Actress	Character	Seasons
Actor/Actress	Character	Season 1
Nomalanga Shozi	Amandla Zungu	Main
Zamani Mbatha	Zakhele Motsepe	Main
Dawn Thandeka King	Florence Zungu	Main
Ernest Ndlovu	Bab Ndlovu	Main
Sello Maake Ka-Ncube	Tom Motsepe	Main
Mbali Ngiba	Busi Motsepe	Main
Siphesihle Vazi	Andile Motsepe	Main
Nomsa Buthelezi	MaBrrr	Main
Warren Masemola	Kotsi	Main
Sweet Guluva	Tofolux Mthethwa	Main
Zintle Sithole	Abongwe Zungu	Main
Lwazi Dlamini	Siyabonga Zungu	Recurring
Thulani Mtsweni	Majika	Main

== Broadcast ==
The series premiered on 17 August 2025 on BET and plays Monday to Friday on DStv channel 129.
