= Isipho =

South African TV drama series

- Genre: Supernatural; Drama series
- Created by: Busisiwe Ntintili
- Written by: Keith Moyo; Tiisetso Tlelima; Sizwe Fortune Zuma; Wilson Shaddai; Nompi Vilakazi; Bakang Sebatjane; Sihle Hlophe; Salah Sabiti; Trish Malone; Linda Bere.
- Directed by: Rolie Nikiwe; King Shaft Moropane; Funeka Mpela; Nhlanhla Masondo.
- Starring: Nimrod Nkosi; Xoli Zondi; Thobani Nzuza; Sparky Xulu; Wandi Chamane; Karabo Maseko; Precious Ngidi; Mbalenhle Mavimbela
- Country of origin: South Africa
- Original language: Multilingual
- No. of episodes: 206

Production
- Executive producers: Hebert Radebe; Busisiwe Ntintili
- Running time: 30 minutes
- Production companies: HerbVision Multimedia; The Ntintili Factory

Original release
- Network: e.tv
- Release: 1 July 2019

Isipho is a South African supernatural drama series created by Busisiwe Ntintili. It is an e.tv original production co-produced by HerbVision Multimedia and The Ntintili Factory for South African free-to-air channel e.tv and streaming service Viu.

This comes after the success of one of e.tv's recent ratings generated by local drama Imbewu: The Seed, albeit its late-night slot of 21:30. e.tv reinvested in its local content offering.

== Plot ==
A young Moses Shezi grew up with the gift of seeing into the future. When his gift leads to the death of his mother, he keeps silent about his gift.

Now in his old age, Moses (Nimrod Nkosi) foresees his daughter Ntombi in danger. A series of visions show him four other strangers which he sets out to find in order to change the course of destiny: a conman, a gqom artist, a weatherman and a pastor's son, each with their own special gifts and conundrums.

== Cast ==
- Thobani Nzuza as Lwandle
- Nimrod Nkosi as Moses Shezi
- Saint Seseli as Pastor Rametsi
- Sparky Xulu as Mpendulo
- Wandi Chamane as Nomzingeli
- Karabo Maseko as Neo
- Precious Ngidi as Ntombi Shezi
- Mbalenhle Mavimbela as Tandzile.
- Themsie Times as Gogo Nqobile.
- Nkanyezi as Xoli Zamisa-Zondi
- Dimpho as Thandeka Nodada
- Sfiso as Sipho Ndhlovu
