= Bambata (musical project) =

- Origin: South Africa
- Genres: Maskanda; Afro Jazz; Reggae; Kwaito; Hip Hop; Rap
- Years active: 1994–present
- Labels: Native Rhythms; Gallo Record Company
- Members: Philangezwi Bongani Nkwanyana; Mathufela Zuma; Bheki Khoza

Bambata is a music project in South Africa which has produced three popular albums, 1906 in 2000, ukhandampondo (poll tax) in 2002, and Abashokobezi 1906–2006 in 2006.

The main forces in this project are Sipho Sithole, director and founder of the Native Rhythms Productions, Philangezwi Bongani Nkwanyana, Mathufela Zuma and Bheki Khoza. They chose the name Bambata for their project in order to honour Bambatha kaMancinza (ca. 1860–1906?), a Zulu chief of the amaZondi tribe in the Colony of Natal (modern Kwazulu-Natal), who had a large role in a rebellion against the English in 1906 when the poll tax was raised from a tax per hut to per head (£1 tax on all native men older than 18).

The basic idea behind the Bambata project is to fuse Zulu traditional rhythms, amahubo (folk music) and maskanda guitar with African and mainstream jazz along with elements of hip hop, rap, reggae and kwaito. For the first two albums Bambata was not a band, but for each album and for many of the individual songs, artists were chosen that could interpret the songs with their individual talents. The third album was more of a group effort, with Philangezwi Bongani Nkwanyana, Mathufela Zuma and Faca forming the core of the group.

The beginnings of the Bambata go back to 1994, when Sithole and Bongani Nkwanyana met at the Windybrow Arts Festival. Sithole recognised in Bongani Nkwanyana an untapped talent, but the latter did not agree to the project until 1998, when Sithole brought along his cousin, the Maskandi singer and guitarist Mathufela Zuma.

The themes in Bambata songs range from suffering under colonialism and imperialism to social issues such as crime and incarceration.

== Awards and nominations ==
The initial album Bambata for their album 1906 was nominated for three categories in the South African Music Awards 2001: Best Newcomer, Best Zulu Music, and Best Adult Contemporary Album: African. Sipho Sithole was also nominated for Best Producer.

Year	Award Ceremony	Prize	Work/Recipient	Result
2001	7th South African Music Awards	Best Newcomer	1906	Nominated
2001	7th South African Music Awards	Best Zulu Music	1906	Nominated
2001	7th South African Music Awards	Best Adult Contemporary Album: African	1906	Nominated

== Discography ==
- 2000: 1906
- 2002: ukhandampondo (poll tax)
- 2006: Abashokobezi 1906–2006
