= Churchill House, Chester =

Historic building at the University of Chester

Coordinates: 53.18646°N 2.88508°W

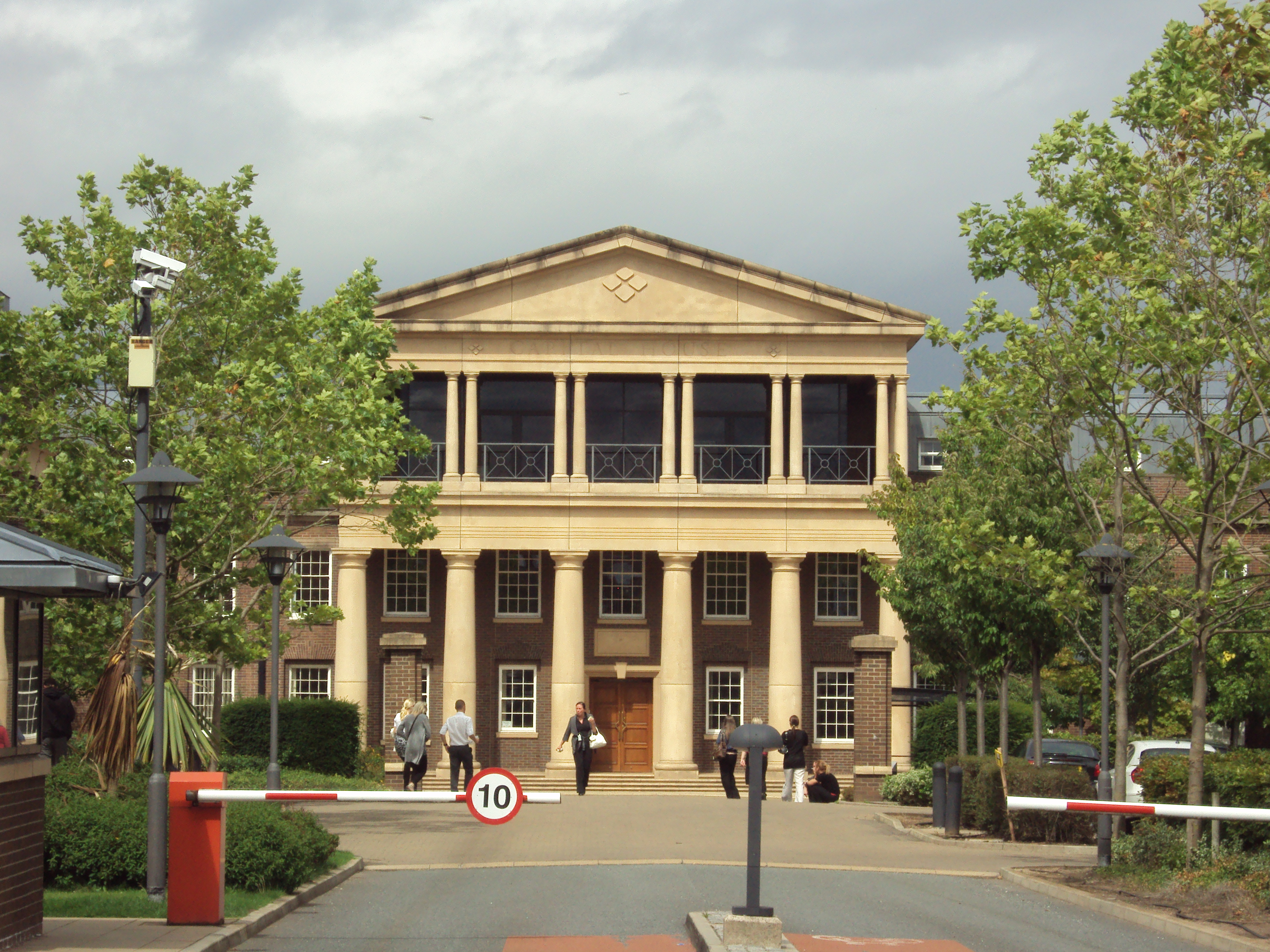
Churchill House, Chester

Churchill House, formerly known as Capital House, is an historic building in Handbridge which currently forms the centre of the Queen's Park Campus of the University of Chester.

== History ==
The building, which was built in buff brick, was completed in 1938. It served as the Headquarters of Western Command during the Second World War and was visited by Prime Minister Winston Churchill, General Dwight D. Eisenhower and General Charles de Gaulle. It remained the command headquarters until that formation was disbanded and the building was handed over to the Royal Army Pay Corps in 1972. The building remained in military use until it was acquired by North West Securities, a subsidiary of Bank of Scotland, for use as their Head Office in 1997.

The building was heavily altered in 1998, with a distinctive hexastyle portico, formed by Doric order columns supporting an entablature and a pediment, being added to the building's façade. The building, which became "Capital House" when North West Securities was re-branded as Capital Bank, passed to HBOS on its formation in 2001 and to Lloyds Banking Group on its formation in 2009. Lloyds decided they had no further use for it in March 2010 and the building, which had stood empty for five years, was acquired by the University of Chester in March 2015. Forming part of the university's Queen's Park Campus, it was re-opened by Jack Churchill, a descendant of Sir Winston Churchill, as Churchill House in October 2019.
