= Mshini Lekwadu =

South African influencer (born 2001)

- Lekwadu in 2025
- Born: Siphesihle Lekwadu; 5 May 2001 (age 25); Soweto, Gauteng, South Africa
- Other name: Mshini
- Occupations: Influencer; television personality
- Years active: 2025–present

Siphesihle Lekwadu (born 5 May 2001), known mononymously as Mshini, is a South African influencer and television personality. She rose to prominence as a contestant on Big Brother Mzansi season 5 (Umlilo). She is the brand ambassador for Hair Majesty by Dj Zinhle.

== Early life ==
Lekwadu was born and raised in Soweto, Gauteng, South Africa. Before her career in entertainment, she worked as a business studies tutor and held a position at Capital Bank, and she acquired the nickname "Mshini", Zulu term for "machine" during her youth, referencing her speed while playing as a winger in soccer.

== Career ==
In early 2025, Lekwadu entered the Big Brother Mzansi house for its fifth season. She became a notable figure in the house for her "Kasi Flava" persona and candidate personality. Her time on the show was characterized by high profile interactions and conflicts with other housemates, which she later discussed in media interviews following her eviction before the week of the finale of the Big Brother Mzansi season 5. After the show in April 2025, she became the brand ambassador for DJ Zinhle's hair brand, Hair Majesty. She later received her first nomination from the South African Social Media Awards for Popular Hashtag on Social Media. She also worked with Pepsi, Londie London Braid and King Pie.

== Personal life ==
=== Relationship ===
In August 2025, Lekwadu was the subject of significant social media attention following an interaction with South African rapper Emtee, where he posted their conversations on public. He after issued a public apology to her regarding the unauthorized sharing of private conversations.

== Filmography ==
Year	Title	Role	Notes
2025	Big Brother Mzansi season 5	Contestant	Evicted, 9th week
2025	Big Brother Mzansi Reunion	Herself	Part 2

== Awards and nominations ==
Year	Association	Category	Nominated works	Result	Ref.
2025	South African Social Media Awards	Popular Hashtag on Social Media	Herself	Nominated	
