= Capital Bank =

Capital Bank may refer to:

- Capital Bank, part of Park Sterling Corp.
- Capital Bank (Botswana)
- Capital Bank (Jordan)
- Capital Bank (Haiti)
- Capital Bank plc (UK)
- Capital Bank (Ghana)
- ABC Capital Bank Uganda Limited, Uganda
- Capital Bank Financial, previously North American Financial Holdings
  - Capital Bank Plaza, its former headquarters
- Capital Bank and Trust, a division of Capital Group Companies
- Capital Bank Tower, Michigan USA
- Cavmont Bank, Zambia
- Imperial Capital Bank, now known as City National Bank
- GE Capital Bank, financial services unit of General Electric
- Pacific Capital Bancorp, California
- Renaissance Capital Bank, Ukraine
- Kapital Bank, Azerbaijan
- Capital Bank (Houston)
