= Isitha: The Enemy =

- Genre: Telenovela
- Created by: Mandla N, and Mpumelelo Nhlapo
- Written by: Eddie Thaba; Bakang Sebatjane; Donald Ndlovu; Sweety Ntshangase, Wilson Shaddai; Elelwani Netshifhire; Makanaka Mavengere; Veronica Nkosana, Kgomotso Aphane; Mashadi Florence Rapeu; Tsale Makam; Mpo Osei-Tutu; Nokuphiwa Magubane; Oratile Mogoje; Seabela Maila
- Theme music composer: Bongo Roit
- Opening theme: Dlozilam Refix
- Composers: Black Brain Pictures; Jamele J Ross; Senzo Afrika; Kurt Slabbert; Henwood; Bongo Riot; Mlindo the Vocalist
- Country of origin: South Africa
- Original languages: English; Zulu
- No. of seasons: 4
- No. of episodes: 780

Production
- Executive producers: Mandla N; Mpumelelo Nhlapo; Annelie van Rooyen
- Producers: Mandla N; Mpumelelo Nhlapo
- Camera setup: Multi-camera
- Running time: 22-24 minutes
- Production company: Black Brain Pictures

Original release
- Network: e.tv
- Release: 22 May 2023 – present

Related
- The Black Door

Isitha: The Enemy is a South African television drama series created by Mandla N and Mpumelelo Nhlapo. It is an e.tv original series produced by BlackBrain Pictures. The series is a spinoff from the adult-themed drama series The Black Door, and stars Dawn Thandeka King, alongside Thobani Nzuza, Senzo Radebe, Sibulele Nthlebi, Sibonginkosi Tenza, Kwanda Manyathi, Nonkululeko Mbatha, Laki Khoza, Bheki Sibiya and Linda Sebezo reprising their roles.

== Premise ==
Initially assumed to be dead, Chuma Sokhulu (Thobani Nzuza) is living in eSwatini under the pseudonym "Lazarus", and has turned to a life of heists. He works under the chiefdom of Chief Ngwenya (Lindani Nkosi), who is in a polygamous relationship. Chief Ngwenya generally favours Ayanda, leaving royal chieftess Nomcebo (Dawn Thandeka King) cast aside. She finds affection in the hands of "Lazarus". Both are soon caught by the prince Mbuso (Khanyisani Kheswa). Chuma is also caught stealing from the chief.

To avoid the chief's wrath, Chuma, with the help of Nomcebo, flee from the country and return to Chuma's home, where (continuing from the events of The Black Door) he finds his brother Khaya (Zamani Mbatha) in bed with his wife Nolitha (Sibulele Ntlebi). Chuma's return also attracts the eye of a long time enemy Rebecca Mabuza (Linda Sebezo).

== Cast ==
Actor/Actress	Character		Seasons			
Actor/Actress	Character	As of The Black Door	Season 1	Season 2	Season 3	Season 4
Thobani Nzuza-Dlomo	Chuma Sokhulu/Gumede	Recurring	Main	Main	Main	Main
Zamani Mbatha	Khaya Sokhulu/Gumede	Main	Main			
Senzokuhle Radebe	Solomzi Gumede		Recurring	Main	Main	Main
Velephi Mnisi-Khumalo	Nomsa Gumede-Nyembe	Main	Main	Main	Main	Main
Patrick Mofokeng	Jafta Nyembe				Main	Main
Linda Sebezo	Rebecca Mabuza	Main	Main	Main	Main	Main
Sibongokuhle Tenza	Nandi "Mkhize-Sokhulu"-Gumede	Main	Main	Main	Main	Main
Dawn Thandeka King	Nomcebo Ngwenya		Main		Guest	Recurring
Andile Maxakaza	Mapholoba					Main
Nonhlanhla Ngubeni	Matshidiso Mkhabela-Sokhulu	Recurring	Main	Main	Main	Main
Dikeledi Modupu	Nelly	Recurring	Main	Main	Main	Main
Ontiretse Radipabe	Martha	Main	Main	Main	Main	Main
Mpilo Mbatha	Kwanda Mapholoba					Main
Sibulele Ntlebi	Nolitha Sokhulu	Recurring	Main	Main	Main	Main
Nonkululeko Mbatha	Thenjiwe Sokhulu	Main	Main	Main	Main	Main
Likhona Mgali	Luyanda "Landan" Bolwa				Main	Recurring
Aya Langa	Siyamthanda Dube				Main	Main
Kwanda Manyathi	Velaphi Sokhulu	Main	Main	Main	Main	Main
Luyanda Zuma	Gog'Dabula					Main
Sthembiso SK Khoza	Sabelo Cele/Bafana Mabuza	Recurring			Main	
Gcina Nkosi	Nqobile KaMavovo Mkhize				Main	Main
Alonso Grandio	Jose Velazquez / Jaco VDM					Guest

== Production ==
It was reported initially in August 2022 that the adult-themed telenovela The Black Door had been cancelled and would not be renewed for a second season. Both Mandla N and e.tv refuted those claims, with Mandla N labelling it as fake news. He said that the series was here to stay, and e.tv said that all was well with The Black Door, and they were unaware of any speculation that the show had been cancelled. However, it was announced that the series would be replaced by its spinoff. The Black Door, which was originally commissioned for 260 episodes, received a 15-episode extension.

In a press release by BlackBrain Pictures, co-creator Mpumelelo Nhlapo mentioned that it was strategically intended for The Black Door to run for one year. The "goal was to break new ground and to push the boundaries of South African television. The greater vision has always been to tell the story of the Sokhulu family as a multi-chapter series that allows us to explore different themes in dynamic and interesting ways."

In May 2023, BlackBrain Pictures hosted an exclusive private screening event at Constitution Hill Women's Prison, in Braamfontein.

== Broadcast ==
The series premiered on 22 May 2023 on e.tv and plays Monday to Friday at 21:30 CAT. The series was also added to streaming service eVOD and has omnibus on Saturdays from 9:00 to 12:00 am.
