= Sweet Guluva =

South African influencer and singer (born 2001)

- Born: Akhonamathemba Mbele-Zwane; 22 October 2001 (age 24); Nquthu, Kwazulu Natal, South Africa
- Education: Cape Peninsula University of Technology
- Occupations: Influencer; singer; actor; television personality
- Years active: 2025–present
- Television: Big Brother Mzansi season 5
- Musical career
- Genres: Afropop; house; electronic
- Instruments: Vocals

Akhonamathemba Mbele-Zwane (born 22 October 2001) professionally known as Sweet Guluva, is a South African actor, singer, influencer and television personality. He gained prominence as the winner of Big Brother Mzansi season 5.

He is currently the brand ambassador of Mzansi Magic 2025. He made his debut song in 2025 with DJ Zinhle. Besides Mzansi Magic ambassadorship, he collaborated with many brands including Dove, Lotto Star, MTN Group.

== Early life ==
Sweet Guluva was born in 2001, in Nquthu, KwaZulu-Natal, South Africa to a Zulu family. He was raised by his mother, but lived a decent life with his late sister. He is currently studying at the Cape Peninsula University of Technology.

== Career ==
Sweet Guluva was a barber, aspiring actor and singer before he entered the Big Brother house. In early 2025, he entered the Big Brother Mzansi house under the nickname Sweet Guluva. Throughout the season, he became a fan favorite due to his charisma, humor, and relatability. On 23 March 2025, he was crowned the winner of Big Brother Mzansi season 5 Umlilo, taking home the grand prize of R2 million. He is the first Big Brother Mzansi winner with highest of vote percentage at all the time scoring 53.48%. He also won R27,500 during his time in the house after playing the Lotto Star Friday Night Arena Games and Robertsons Master Braai challenge.

Mbele became a sought-after public figure, where he was named the new brand ambassador for Mzansi Magic alongside his fellow top 5 finalists. He landed new sponsorship deal after partnering up with the local brand Konke Kuhamba Kahle Clothing. Following his win, Sweet Guluva became a sought-after public figure. He collaborated with Dove Men Care where they competing in Clicks BroScape Fives Championship alongside Zamani Mbatha, Arno Greeff, Primo9teen, Juicy Jay, DJ Naives and Zola Mcaciso. By May 2025, he was named the brand ambassador of All Gold tomato sauce and will be hosting Afrotainment Marquee after 2025 Hollywoodbets Durban July event with DJ Tira, Zee Nxumalo, MaWhoo etc.

He was invited to MC major events, including the Durban Music Fest in May 2025, alongside artists such as Sjava, DJ Sox, and Somizi. DJ Zinhle announced that she plans to collaborate with him in a song. He made his debut song with famous music producer DJ Zintle, Nokwazi Dlamini and NDLOH JNR "titled Sweet Guluva" that was released on 6 June 2025. He made his first ever stage performance in MTN Bushfire event alongside Murdah Bongz. He begged a role in BET Africa telenovela Black Gold as Tofolux Mthethwa. In September 2025, he was honoured as the Best Dressed Reader by GQ South Africa.

== Filmography ==
Year	Title	Role	Notes
2025	Big Brother Mzansi season 5	Contestant	Winner
2025–present	Black Gold	Tofolux Mthethwa	Starring role, season 1

== Discography ==
=== Singles ===
==== As lead artist ====
List of singles as lead artist, with selected chart positions and certifications, showing year released and album name
Title	Year	Peak chart positions	Certifications	Album
Title	Year	ZA	Certifications	Album
"Ntekenteke" (Halo Yagami, Sweet Guluva & Umntungwambulazi)	2025	—		Non-album single
"—" denotes a recording that did not chart or was not released in that territory.

==== As featured artist ====
List of singles as featured artist, with selected chart positions and certifications, showing year released and album name
Title	Year	Peak chart positions	Certifications	Album
Title	Year	ZA	Certifications	Album
"Sweet Guluva"(DJ Zinhle, NDLOH JNR featuring Sweet Guluva & Nokwazi Dlamini)	2025	—		Non-album single
"—" denotes a recording that did not chart or was not released in that territory.

== Awards and nominations ==
Year	Association	Category	Nominated works	Result	Ref.
2025	GQ South Africa	Best Dressed Reader	Himself	Honoured	
2025	South African Social Media Awards	Best Social Media Newcomer of the Year	Himself	Won	

Awards and achievements
Preceded by Siphephelo "McJunior" Zondi	Big Brother Mzansi winner 2025	Succeeded by Liema Pantsi
