= William Paterson (banker) =

Scottish trader and banker

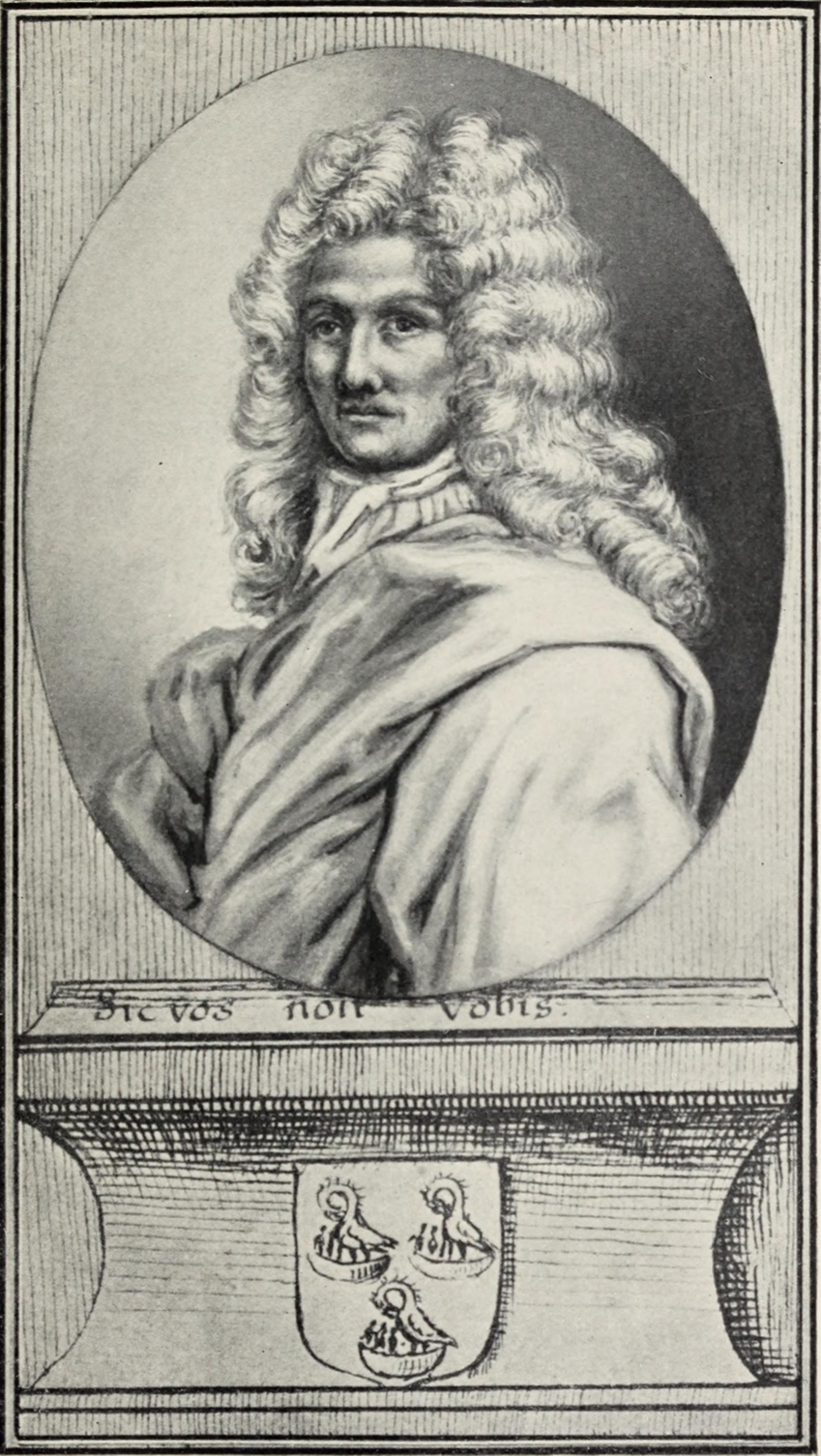
William Paterson, from a wash drawing in the British Museum

William Paterson (April 1658 - 22 January 1719) was a Scottish trader and banker. He was a founding member of the Bank of England and was one of the main proponents of the catastrophic Darien scheme. Later he became an advocate of union with England.

== Biography ==
=== Early life ===
William Paterson was born in his parents' farmhouse at Tinwald in Dumfriesshire, Scotland, and lived with them until he was seventeen, when he emigrated first (briefly) to Bristol and then to the Bahamas, although accounts differ as to the duration of his stays. During his time in the West Indies he first conceived the idea of the Darién scheme, his plan to create a colony on the isthmus of Panama, facilitating trade with the Far East. While in the West Indies, it is said that he acted as a merchant, developing a reputation for business acumen and dealings with local buccaneers. Walter Herries claimed that the English privateer William Dampier shared his knowledge of Darién with Paterson.

=== Career ===
Paterson returned to Europe by the middle of the 1680s, and attempted to convince the English government under James II to undertake the Darién scheme. When they refused, he tried again to persuade the governments of the Holy Roman Empire, the Dutch Republic and Brandenburg to establish a colony in Panama, but failed in each case.

Paterson then went to London in 1687 and made his fortune with foreign trade (primarily through the slave trade with the West Indies) in the Merchant Taylors' Company. He also helped to found a company for supplying water to North London from the Hampstead Hills, known as the Hampstead Water Company which existed until the late 19th century.

In 1694, he co-founded the Bank of England. It was said that the project originated with him in 1691, as described in his pamphlet A Brief Account of the Intended Bank of England, to act as the English government's banker. He proposed a loan of £1.2m to the government; in return the subscribers would be incorporated as The Governor and Company of the Bank of England with banking privileges including the issue of notes. The Royal Charter was granted on 27 July 1694. On the foundation of the bank in 1694 he became a director. In 1695, owing to a disagreement with his colleagues, he withdrew from the board and devoted himself to the colony of Darien, unsuccessfully planted in 1698.

=== Darien scheme ===
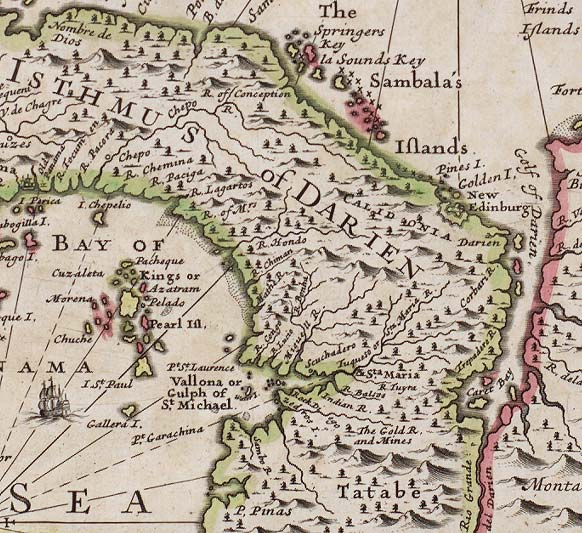
’A New Map of the Isthmus of Darien in America, The Bay of Panama’, in A letter giving a description of the Isthmus of Darian, Edinburgh: 1699. The Scottish settlement of New Edinburgh can be seen on the coast above right, west of the Gulf of Darien.

Paterson relocated to Edinburgh, where he was able to convince the Scottish government to undertake the Darién scheme, a failed attempt to found an independent Scottish Empire in what is today Panama. Paterson personally accompanied the disastrous Scottish expedition to Panama in 1698, where his wife, Hannah Kemp, and their child died, while he himself became seriously ill. On his return to Scotland in December 1699, he became instrumental in the movement for the Union of Scotland and England, culminating in his support of the Act of Union 1707. He spent the last years of his life in Westminster, and died in January 1719. A mystery still surrounds the burial site of Paterson. Many (including officials at the Bank of England), believe he is buried in Sweetheart Abbey, New Abbey, Dumfries and Galloway.

== Publications ==
- A Brief Account of the Intended Bank of England Paterson, (London: 1694), http://name.umdl.umich.edu/A56581.0001.001. Paterson's proposal for a bank.
- Proposals and Reasons for Constitulating a Council of Trade (1701), a plan to create a Scottish council of Trade which would stimulate the Scottish economy and trade, partly by abolishing export duties.
- A Proposal to plant a Colony in Darién to protect the Indians against Spain, and to open the Trade of South America to all Nations (1701), a broader version of the Darién scheme intended to bring free trade to all of Central and South America.
- Wednesday Club Dialogues upon the Union (1706), a series of imaginary dialogues in which Paterson expressed his beliefs that Scotland had to be guaranteed equal taxation, freedom of trade and proportionate representation in Parliament if union with England was to succeed.

== In fiction and drama ==
William Paterson is the central character in Eliot Warburton's novel, Darien, or, The Merchant Prince (1852). He also features in Douglas Galbraith's novel, The Rising Sun (2000), and Alistair Beaton's play, Caledonia (2010).

== See also ==
- Acts of Union 1707
- Saxe Bannister
- Daniel Defoe, writer and novelist
- John Holland, founder of the Bank of Scotland
- Lionel Wafer, a buccaneer who had been marooned for four years on the isthmus of Darién, whom Paterson hired as an adviser for the Darién Scheme.
