= Big Brother Mzansi season 5 =

Big Brother Mzansi
- Season 5
- Presented by: Smash Afrika
- No. of days: 71
- No. of housemates: 24
- Winner: Sweet Guluva
- Runner-up: Uyanda

Release
- Original network: Mzansi Magic; Mzansi Wethu; DStv/GOtv (live)
- Original release: 12 January – 23 March 2025

Season chronology
- ← Previous; Season 4 Next → Season 6

Big Brother Mzansi: Umlilo (also known as Big Brother Mzansi 5 or Big Brother South Africa 7) was the fifth season of the South African Big Brother reality television reboot series produced by Banijay and Red Pepper Pictures for M-Net and Mzansi Magic. It premiered on 12 January 2025 on DStv channel 198 and concluded on 23 March. Sweet Guluva won the season, while Uyanda was the runner-up.

LottoStar returned as the headline sponsor, while the tactical partner was Robertsons Spices and the alcohol sponsor was Chillers Punch.

Smash Afrika replaced Lawrence Maleka as the show's host.

== Housemates ==
On 12 January 2025, 24 housemates entered the house.

Housemates	Age on entry	Occupation	Residence	Day entered	Day exited	Status
Akhonamathemba "Sweet Guluva" Zwane	23	Student	Cape Town, Western Cape	0	70	Winner
Uyanda Hlangabezo	23	High school teacher	Gqeberha, Eastern Cape	0	70	Runner-up
Nsuku Mabunda	29	Student	Johannesburg, Gauteng	0	70	3rd place
Fortunate "Nate" Setwaba	26	Orthotist	Johannesburg, Gauteng	0	70	4th place
Karabo "Sejojo	22	Entrepreneur	Bloemfontein, Free State	0	70	5th place
Siphesihle "Mshini" Lekwadu	23	Tutor	Soweto, Gauteng	0	63	Evicted
Siphesihle Mabaso	28	Financial advisor	Secunda, Mpumalanga	0	63	Evicted
Abongile "Abobo" Salli	30	Teacher	Cape Town, Western Cape	0	63	Evicted
Siyabonga "Swiss" Mlangeni	28	Student	Pietermaritzburg, KwaZulu-Natal	0	56	Evicted
Bokang "Beekay" Chephetsa	23	Electrician	Johannesburg, Gauteng	0	56	Evicted
Amanda "Mandy Hagan" Makhathini	33	ECD Practitioner	Johannesburg, Gauteng	0	49	Evicted
Tyrone Willard	26	Social media consultant	Qonce, Eastern Cape	0	49	Evicted
Philile Nzama	31	Unemployed	Durban, KwaZulu-Natal	0	49	Evicted
Mmelesi "Melino" King Mothei	26	Artist Manager	Johannesburg, Gauteng	0	49	Evicted
Muziomhle "Muzi-TheMbuzi" Mdluli	29	Self-employed	Johannesburg, Gauteng	0	42	Evicted
Mathapelo "Mata" Mashila	27	Musical artist	Johannesburg, Gauteng	0	42	Evicted
Ash-ley Ogle	26	Unemployed	Durban, KwaZulu-Natal	0	29	Evicted
Luzuko Mashalaba	29	Sales Agent	Johannesburg, Gauteng	0	28	Evicted
Abongile "Ezra" Mhambi	27	Farmer	Butterworth/East London, Eastern Cape	0	28	Evicted
Siphamandla "Sipha Lee" Mthembu	26	Unemployed	Johannesburg, Gauteng	0	28	Evicted
Nokulunga "Gugu" Ndabezitha	34	Unemployed	Johannesburg, Gauteng	0	21	Evicted
Florence "Kay B" Mphirime	23	Student	Bloemfontein, Free State	0	17	Ejected
Bongiwe "Bonni Bee" Booi	29	Telesales Agent	Johannesburg, Gauteng	0	14	Evicted
Hassan "Savage" Rigney	28	Personal trainer	Johannesburg, Gauteng	0	14	Evicted

The launch night (12 January) is marked as Day 0. The day after is Day 1.

== Voting history & Nominations ==
	Week 1	Week 2	Week 3	Week 4	Week 5	Week 6	Week 7	Week 8	Week 9	Week 10 Final	Nominations & votes received
Head of House	Sweet Guluva	~~Uyanda~~; Sipha Lee	Ezra	~~Swiss~~; Jojo	Swiss	Tyrone	Mshini	Nsuku	Uyanda	Jojo	Nominations & votes received
Sweet Guluva	Jojo; Gugu	Bonnie Bee; Nsuku	Nsuku; Kay B	Nsuku; Mshini	Nsuku	Nsuku; Mshini	No Voting	Mshini; Swiss	No Voting	Winner (Day 70)	3
Uyanda	Swiss; Mandy Hagan	Swiss; Nate	Sipha Lee; Swiss	Ezra; Swiss	Nate	Swiss; Nate	No Voting	Jojo; Mshini	No Voting	Runner-up (Day 70)	16
Nsuku	Kay B Mandy Hagan	Nate; Kay B	Mandy Hagan; Siphesihle	Sipha Lee; Melino	Ash-ley Ogle	Mandy Hagan; Mata	No Voting	Uyanda; Jojo	No Voting	3rd place (Day 70)	28
Nate	Abobo; Gugu	Philile; Savage	Philile; Abobo	Luzuko; Mandy Hagan	Abobo	Abobo; Siphesihle	No Voting	Mshini; Uyanda	No Voting	4th place (Day 70)	20
Jojo	Muzi-TheMbuzi; Gugu	Bonni Bee; Nsuku	Gugu; Siphesihle	Swiss; Ezra	Nsuku	Beekay; Muzi-TheMbuzi	No Voting	Beekay; Mshini	No Voting	5th place (Day 70)	8
Mshini	Kay B Tyrone	Ezra; Mandy Hagan	Ash-ley Ogle; Sweet Guluva	Ezra; Sipha Lee	Ash-ley Ogle	Beekay; Nate	No Voting	Beekay; Nate	No Voting	Evicted (Day 63)	11
Siphesihle	Ash-ley Ogle; Nsuku	Savage; Ash-ley Ogle	Jojo; Ash-ley Ogle	Nate; Sweet Guluva	Nate	Nate; Melino	No Voting	Sweet Guluva; Mshini	No Voting	Evicted (Day 63)	8
Abobo	Philile; Siphesihle	Ezra; Swiss	Swiss; Nate	Nate; Sipha Lee	Nsuku	Swiss; Nate	No Voting	Nate; Swiss	No Voting	Evicted (Day 63)	12
Swiss	Uyanda; Nsuku	Abobo; Nsuku	Gugu; Nsuku	Uyanda; Mandy Hagan	Uyanda	Uyanda; Abobo	No Voting	Uyanda; Siphesihle	Evicted (Day 56)		15
Beekay	Abobo; Savage	Mandy Hagan; Mata	Mata; Luzuko	Mata; Luzuko	Mata	Jojo; Mata	No Voting	Uyanda; Mshini	Evicted (Day 56)		8
Melino	Kay B Savage	Abobo; Bonni Bee	Uyanda; Nsuku	Muzi-TheMbuzi; Beekay	Mshini	Nate; Nsuku	No Voting	Evicted (Day 49)			5
Tyrone	Kay B Ezra	Uyanda; Abobo	Siphesihle; Gugu	Mandy Hagan; Sipha Lee	Ash-ley Ogle	Sweet Guluva; Mshini	No Voting	Evicted (Day 49)			2
Philile	Ash-ley Ogle; Sipha Lee	Ezra; Savage	Uyanda; Luzuko	Ezra; Nate	Muzi-TheMbuzi	Muzi-TheMbuzi; Melino	No Voting	Evicted (Day 49)			6
Mandy Hagan	Nsuku; Philile	Ezra; Bonni Bee	Sipha Lee; Swiss	Swiss; Muzi-TheMbuzi	Nsuku	Nsuku; Muzi-TheMbuzi	No Voting	Evicted (Day 49)			12
Muzi-TheMbuzi	Siphesihle; Melino	Gugu; Luzuko	Gugu; Jojo	Luzuko; Mandy Hagan	Ash-ley Ogle	Mandy Hagan; Jojo	Evicted (Day 42)				7
Mata	Kay B Savage	Nate; Kay B	Nate; Kay B	Sipha Lee; Ezra	Siphesihle	Beekay; Nsuku	Evicted (Day 42)				7
Ash-ley Ogle	Kay B Savage	Bonni Bee; Savage	Mshini; Kay B	Mshini; Swiss	Mshini	Evicted (Day 29)					12
Sipha Lee	Mandy Hagan; Kay B	Bonni Bee; Uyanda	Uyanda; Abobo	Uyanda; Abobo	Evicted (Day 28)						8
Ezra	Ash-ley Ogle; Tyrone	Nsuku; Bonni Bee	Abobo; Nsuku	Nsuku; Uyanda	Evicted (Day 28)						10
Luzuko	Beekay; Nsuku	Nsuku; Beekay	Nsuku; Philile	Uyanda; Nsuku	Evicted (Day 28)						6
Gugu	Mata; Jojo	Nate; Savage	Nsuku; Swiss	Evicted (Day 21)							11
Kay B	Nsuku; Melino	Bonni Bee; Nsuku	Gugu; Philile	Ejected (Day 17)							13
Bonni Bee	Gugu; Ash-ley Ogle	Nate; Kay B	Evicted (Day 14)								8
Savage	Uyanda; Ash-ley Ogle	Nate; Gugu	Evicted (Day 14)								9
Note	none	1	2	3	4	5	6, 7	8	9	none	
Nominated (pre-save and replace)	Fake Nominations	Abobo; Bonni Bee; Ezra; Nate; Nsuku; Savage	Abobo; Gugu; Kay B Nsuku; Philile; Swiss; Siphesihle; Uyanda	Ezra; Luzuko; Mandy Hagan Nate; Nsuku; Sipha Lee; Swiss; Uyanda	Ash-ley Ogle; Nsuku	Abobo; Beekay; Jojo; Mandy Hagan; Mata; Melino; Muzi-TheMbuzi; Nate; Nsuku; Siphesihle; Swiss	Abobo; Beekay; Jojo; Mandy Hagan; Melino; Nate; Nsuku; Philile; Siphesihle; Sweet Guluva; Swiss; Tyrone; Uyanda	Beekay; Jojo; Mshini; Nate; Swiss; Uyanda	Abobo; Jojo; Mshini; Nate; Nsuku; Siphesihle; Sweet Guluva	Jojo; Nate; Nusku; Sweet Guluva; Uyanda	
Saved	Fake Nominations	Ezra	Swiss	Mandy Hagan	No Voting	none					
Against public vote	No Voting	Abobo; Bonni Bee; Nate; Nsuku; Savage; Uyanda	Abobo; Gugu; Kay B Mata; Nsuku; Philile; Siphesihle; Uyanda	Ezra; Luzuko; Nate; Nsuku; Sipha Lee; Swiss; Uyanda	No Voting	Abobo; Beekay; Jojo; Mandy Hagan; Mata; Melino; Muzi-TheMbuzi; Nate; Nsuku; Siphesihle; Swiss	Abobo; Beekay; Jojo; Mandy Hagan; Melino; Nate; Nsuku; Philile; Siphesihle; Sweet Guluva; Swiss; Tyrone; Uyanda	Beekay; Jojo; Mshini; Nate; Sweet Guluva; Swiss; Uyanda	Abobo; Jojo; Mshini; Nate; Nsuku; Siphesihle; Sweet Guluva	Jojo; Nate; Nusku; Sweet Guluva; Uyanda	
Ejected	No Voting	none	Kay B	none	No Voting	none					
Walked	No Voting	none			No Voting	none					
Evicted	No Evictions	Savage; 3.34% to save	Gugu; 1.16% to save	Sipha Lee; 1.79% to save	Ash-ley Ogle; Evicted by Swiss	Mata; 3.52% to save	Melino; 0.70% to save	Beekay; 3.56% to save	Abobo; 3.78% to save	Jojo; 1.80% to win	
Evicted	No Evictions	Savage; 3.34% to save	Gugu; 1.16% to save	Ezra; 4.61% to save	Ash-ley Ogle; Evicted by Swiss	Mata; 3.52% to save	Philile; 0.71% to save	Beekay; 3.56% to save	Siphesihle; 5.91% to save	Nate; 3.45% to win	
Evicted	No Evictions	Bonni Bee; 3.58% to save	Gugu; 1.16% to save	Luzuko; 4.76% to save	Ash-ley Ogle; Evicted by Swiss	Muzi-TheMbuzi; 3.80% to save	Tyrone; 1.02% to save	Swiss; 3.94% to save	Mshini; 6.70% to save	Nsuku; 9.60% to win	
Evicted	No Evictions	Bonni Bee; 3.58% to save	Gugu; 1.16% to save	Luzuko; 4.76% to save	Ash-ley Ogle; Evicted by Swiss	Muzi-TheMbuzi; 3.80% to save	Mandy Hagan; 1.34% to save	Swiss; 3.94% to save	Mshini; 6.70% to save	Uyanda; 31.67% to win	
Survived	No Evictions	Abobo; 5.22% to save Nsuku; 22.97% to save Nate; 29.15% to save Uyanda; 35.74% to save	Mata; 1.64% to save Philile; 4.71% to save Siphesihle; 5.14% to save Abobo; 9.15% to save Nsuku; 27.76% to save Uyanda; 50.44% to save	Swiss; 7.29% to save Nate; 10.53% to save Nsuku; 21.24% to save Uyanda; 49.78% to save	Nsuku	Swiss; 3.83% to save Siphesihle; 4.80% to save Mandy Hagan; 6.15% to save Melino; 6.56% to save Beekay; 7.51% to save Nate; 8.63% to save Jojo; 16.04% to save Abobo; 17.62% to save Nsuku; 21.54% to save	Siphesihle; 1.53% to save Abobo; 2.00% to save Beekay; 2.44% to save Swiss; 2.45% to save Jojo; 3.68% to save Nate; 4.19% to save Nsuku; 11.04% to save Uyanda; 23.91% to save Sweet Guluva; 45.02% to save	Jojo; 5.28% to save Nate; 6.17% to save Mshini; 6.97% to save Uyanda; 25.85% to save Sweet Guluva; 48.23% to save	Jojo; 6.84% to save Nate; 7.46% to save Nsuku; 13.20% to save Sweet Guluva; 56.11% to save	Sweet Guluva; 53.48% to win	

=== Notes ===
- ^Note 1: In Week 2, after Uyanda won the HoH games, his reign was short-lived, as Big Brother introduced an HoH Challenger game. This was won by Sipha Lee who became the new HoH.
- ^Note 2: On Day 17, Kay B was disqualified after she was deemed to have sexually harassed Beekay and other contestants.
- ^Note 3: In Week 4, the HoH challenger won the power to save but not replace.
- ^Note 4: In Week 5, Big Brother asked the housemates to nominate one housemate for eviction. Ash-ley and Nsuku were on the chopping block, and HoH Swiss was asked to choose one of them for immediate eviction. He chose Ash-ley Ogle.
- ^Note 5: In Week 6, Big Brother introduced face-to-face nominations. The HoH then had the special power of adding an Inferno Nomination. HoH Tyrone chose Siphesihle.
- ^Note 6: In Week 7, all housemates were automatically up for eviction, except HoH Mshini.
- ^Note 7: In Week 7, Melino won the opportunity to go straight to the final if he survived the week's eviction.
- ^Note 8: In Week 8, HoH Nsuku selected Sweet Guluva as her Inferno Nomination.
- ^Note 9: In Week 9, all housemates were automatically up for eviction, except HoH Uyanda.

== Nomination table ==
Weeks	Nominated	Evicted
Week 1	Fake Nominations	None
Week 2	Abobo, Bonni Bee, Nate, Nsuku, Savage & Uyanda	Bonni Bee & Savage
Week 3	Abobo, Gugu, Kay B, Mata, Nsuku, Philile, Siphesihle & Uyanda	Kay B (Ejected) & Gugu
Week 4	Ezra, Luzuko, Nate, Nsuku, Sipha Lee, Swiss & Uyanda	Ezra, Luzuko & Sipha Lee
Week 5	Ash-ley Ogle & Nsuku	Ash-ley Ogle
Week 6	Abobo, Beekay, Jojo, Mandy Hagan, Mata, Melino, Muzi-TheMbuzi, Nate, Nsuku, Siphesihle & Swiss	Mata & Muzi-TheMbuzi
Week 7	Abobo, Beekay, Jojo, Mandy Hagan, Melino, Nate, Nsuku, Philile, Siphesihle, Sweet Guluva, Swiss, Tyrone & Uyanda	Mandy Hagan, Melino, Philile & Tyrone
Week 8	Beekay, Jojo, Mshini, Nate, Sweet Guluva, Swiss & Uyanda	Beekay & Swiss
Week 9	Abobo, Jojo, Mshini, Nate, Nsuku, Siphesihle & Sweet Guluva	Abobo, Mshini & Siphesihle
Week 10	Jojo, Nate, Nsuku, Sweet Guluva & Uyanda	Jojo, Nate, Nsuku & Uyanda
