= Zamani Mbatha =

South African actor and influencer

- Born: 7 April 1998 (age 28); KwaMashu, Durban, South Africa
- Education: Bechet High School; Holy Family College
- Occupations: Actor; influencer; model
- Years active: 2017–present
- Relatives: Nomzamo Mbatha (sister)

Zamani Mbatha (born 7 April 1998) is a South African actor, influencer and model. He is best known for his lead roles in the Mzansi Magic Isithembiso telenovela as Zamani and e.tv series Rhythm City as Pule Ndlovu. He made his first runway debut in L'Oreal Paris Walk Your Worth fashion show with Thuso Mbedu, Thembi Seete and among others.

== Early life ==
Mbatha was born in the township of KwaMashu north-west of Durban, KwaZulu Natal. He is the younger brother of actress and television presenter Nomzamo Mbatha. He attended from the Bechet High School and Holy Family College.

== Career ==
=== 2017–2023: Career beginnings, The Black Door and Isitha: The Enemy ===
Mbatha was inspired by his big sister Nomzamo Mbatha in acting and media industry. He made his first television debut in Mzansi Magic television Isithembiso playing the lead role of Zamani. He received his first nomination in his career for Rising Star at the DStv Mzansi Viewers' Choice Awards. In 2020, he bagged the starring role of Puleng Ndlovu in e.tv drama series Rhythm City. In 2021, he portrayed the lead role of Benny in Isiphindiselo.

In 2022, Mbatha he worked in Black Brain production by Mandla N. He also played the lead role of Khaya Sokhulu in e.tv telenovela The Black Door, and the telenovela changed into Isitha: The Enemy but the same cast for season 2 of The Black Door. He also played the lead role of Siya in a Netflix series The Brave Ones. He was featured in GQ magazine cover and named the Best Dressed Men. In late 2023, he quite from the show Isitha.

=== 2024–present: Shaka ilembe ===
In 2024, he walked in L'Oreal Paris Walk Your Worth fashion show. By 2025, he will cast in Shaka iLembe movie season 2. He collaborated with Dove Men Care brand where they were competing in Clicks BroScape Fives Championship alongside other actors and influencers Sweet Guluva, Arno Greeff, Primo9teen, Juicy Jay, DJ Naives and Zola Mcaciso.

== Filmography ==
Year	Film	Role	
2017	Isithembiso	Zamani	Lead Role, season 1 to 3
2020	Rhythm City	Pule Ndlovu	Starring role
2021	Isiphindiselo	Benjamin aka Benny	Supporting role
2021	Jiva!	Bheki	Starring role
2022	The Brave Ones	Siya	Starring role
2022	The Black Door	Khaya Sokhulu	Lead role, season 1
2023	Isitha: The Enemy	Khaya Sokhulu	Lead role
2025	Shaka Ilembe	Nomahlanjana	Starring role, season 2
2025	Black Gold	Zakhele Motsepe	Main role, season 1

== Awards and nominations ==
Year	Association	Category	Nominated works	Result	Ref.
2017	DStv Mzansi Viewers' Choice Awards	Rising Star	As Zamani in Isithembiso	Nominated	
2022	GQ	Best Dressed Men	Himself	Won	
2024	Royalty Soapie Awards	Viewers Choice Best Actor	As Khaya Sokhulu in The Black Door	Nominated	
