= Bank of Scotland =

Bank based in Edinburgh, Scotland

Bank of Scotland plc

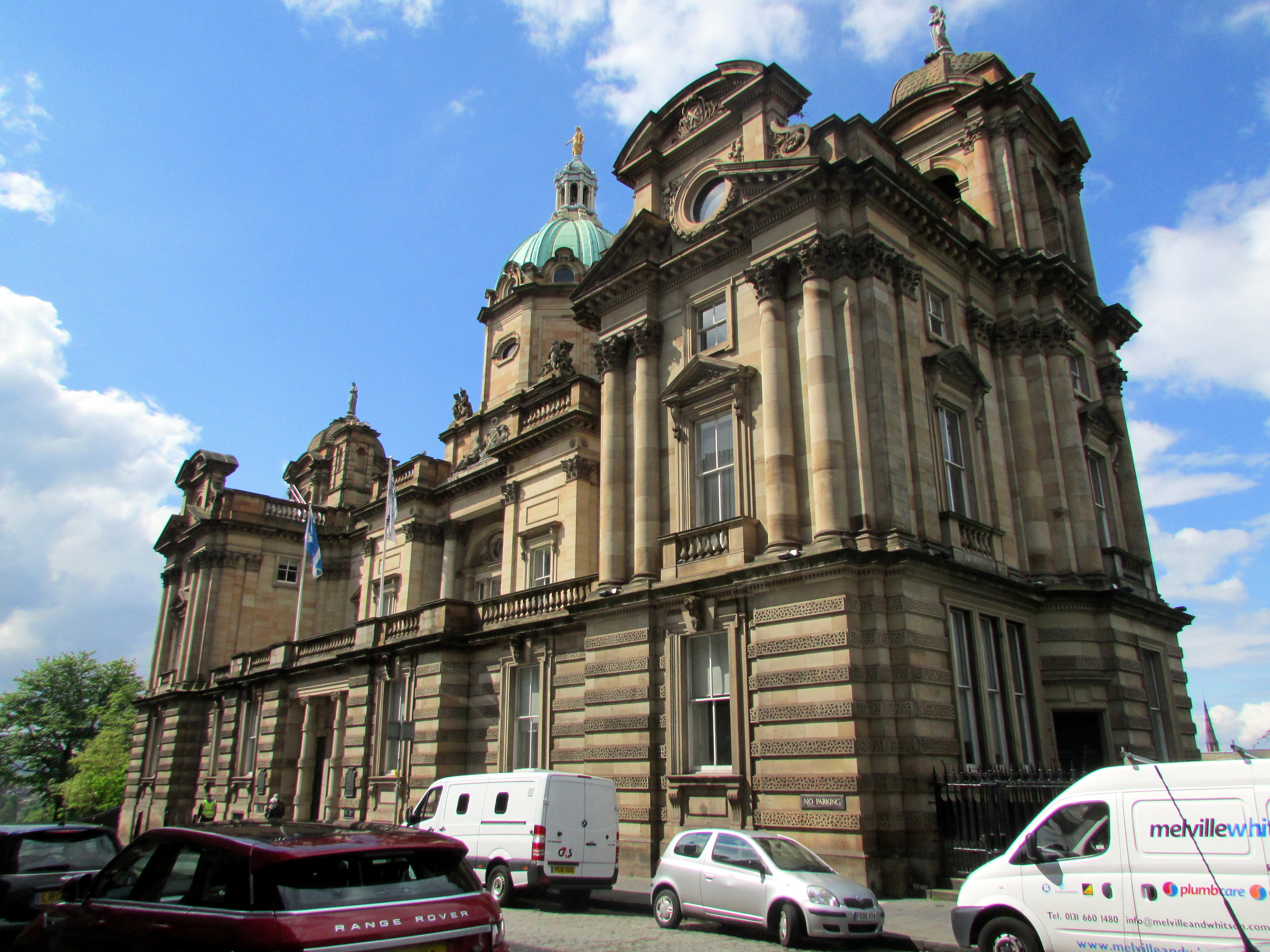
- Headquarters building on The Mound
- Native name: Banca na h-Alba (Scottish Gaelic); Bank o Scotland (Scots)
- Type: Public
- Industry: Banking and financial services
- Founded: 17 July 1695; 331 years ago, Edinburgh, Kingdom of Scotland
- Founder: Parliament of Scotland
- Headquarters: The Mound; Edinburgh, Scotland, UK
- Area served: Scotland
- Products: Retail banking; Commercial banking; Investment banking; Loans; Investment management; Insurance; Pensions; Mortgages
- Net income: £1.337 billion (2025)
- Total assets: £339.589 billion (2025)
- Number of employees: 20,293 (2024)
- Parent: Lloyds Banking Group
- Divisions: Halifax
- Website: www.bankofscotland.co.uk

Bank of Scotland plc (Scottish Gaelic: Banca na h-Alba) is a commercial and clearing bank based in Edinburgh, Scotland, that is part of the Lloyds Banking Group.

The bank had a total asset amount of over £339 billion in 2025. The bank, established by the Parliament of Scotland in 1695, aimed to develop Scotland's trade with other countries and to create a stable banking system in the country. The first bank to be established in Scotland, it is the oldest operational bank in the country, the ninth oldest bank in continuous operation globally, as well as the longest continuous issuer of banknotes in the world.

With a history dating to the end of the 17th century, the Bank of Scotland was the first bank to have been established in Scotland, and, it is the fifth-oldest extant bank in the United Kingdom (the Bank of England having been established one year earlier). It is the only commercial institution created by the Parliament of Scotland, when Scotland was an independent, sovereign state, to remain in existence. It was the first bank in Europe to successfully print its own banknotes, and it continues to print its own sterling banknotes under legal arrangements that allow Scottish banks to issue currency.

In June 2006, the HBOS Group Reorganisation Act 2006 was passed by the Parliament of the United Kingdom, allowing the bank's structure to be simplified. As a result, The Governor and Company of the Bank of Scotland became Bank of Scotland plc on 17 September 2007. Bank of Scotland has been a subsidiary of Lloyds Banking Group since 19 January 2009, when HBOS was acquired by Lloyds TSB.

== History ==
=== Establishment ===
Bank of Scotland Act 1695
- Act of Parliament
- Parliament of Scotland
- Long title: Act for Erecting a Publick Bank.
- Citation: 1695 c. 88

Dates
- Royal assent: 17 July 1695

During the 1690s, public finances and economic prospects of the country were largely uncertain, with credit proving difficult to gain and cash being in relative short supply. A group of merchants saw the establishment of a public bank as the solution to the financial issues facing the country at the time, with The Governor and Company of the Bank of Scotland being established by an act of the Parliament of Scotland on 17 July 1695, the Act for erecting a Bank in Scotland, opening for business in February 1696. Although established soon after the Bank of England (1694), the Bank of Scotland was a very different institution. Whereas the Bank of England was established specifically to finance defence spending by the English government, the Bank of Scotland was established by the Scottish government to support Scottish business, and was prohibited from lending to the government without parliamentary approval.

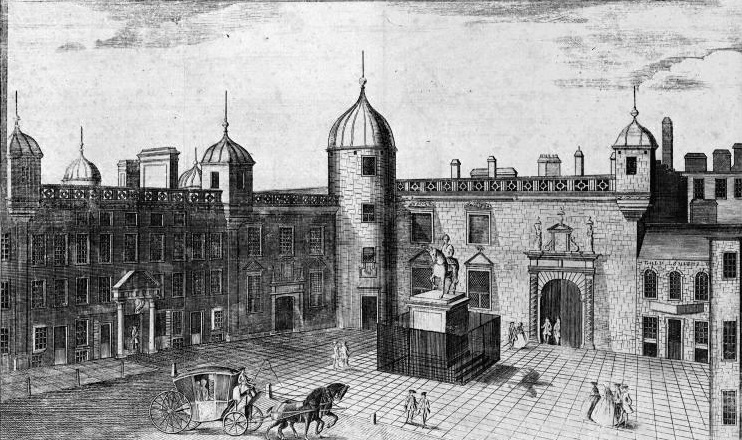
The bank was established by the Parliament of Scotland, the legislature of the Kingdom of Scotland in 1695.

The founding act granted the bank a monopoly on public banking in Scotland for 21 years, permitted the bank's directors to raise a nominal capital of £1,200,000 pound Scots (£100,000 pound sterling), gave the proprietors (shareholders) limited liability, and in the final clause (repealed only in 1920) made all foreign-born proprietors naturalised Scotsmen "to all Intents and Purposes whatsoever". John Holland was one of the bank's founders, and its first chief accountant was George Watson. Following the establishment of the Bank of Scotland, and the raising of capital funds, the bank was able to provide loans in order to stabilise Scottish businesses and the Scottish economy.

During its early days of operation, the Bank of Scotland acted as a means of public financial support during tough economic situations. The condition of harvest conditions leading to poor harvests and crops led to food shortages in Scotland during the 1700s, with the Bank of Scotland providing interest-free loans to help purchase meal and grain as a result of the lack of food due to harvest conditions. The bank was the first bank in Europe to produce banknotes. Until the development of banknotes, coinage was the only means of cash, but it was largely scarce and unreliable. The bank developed the idea of paper money, each with a set number of values. Banknotes were initially issued for £5, £10, £20, £50 and £100, all of which were issued from March 1696, with a £1 note being introduced into circulation later. The Bank of Scotland still produces its own banknotes, making the bank the longest continuous banknote issuer in the world.

=== 18th and 19th centuries ===
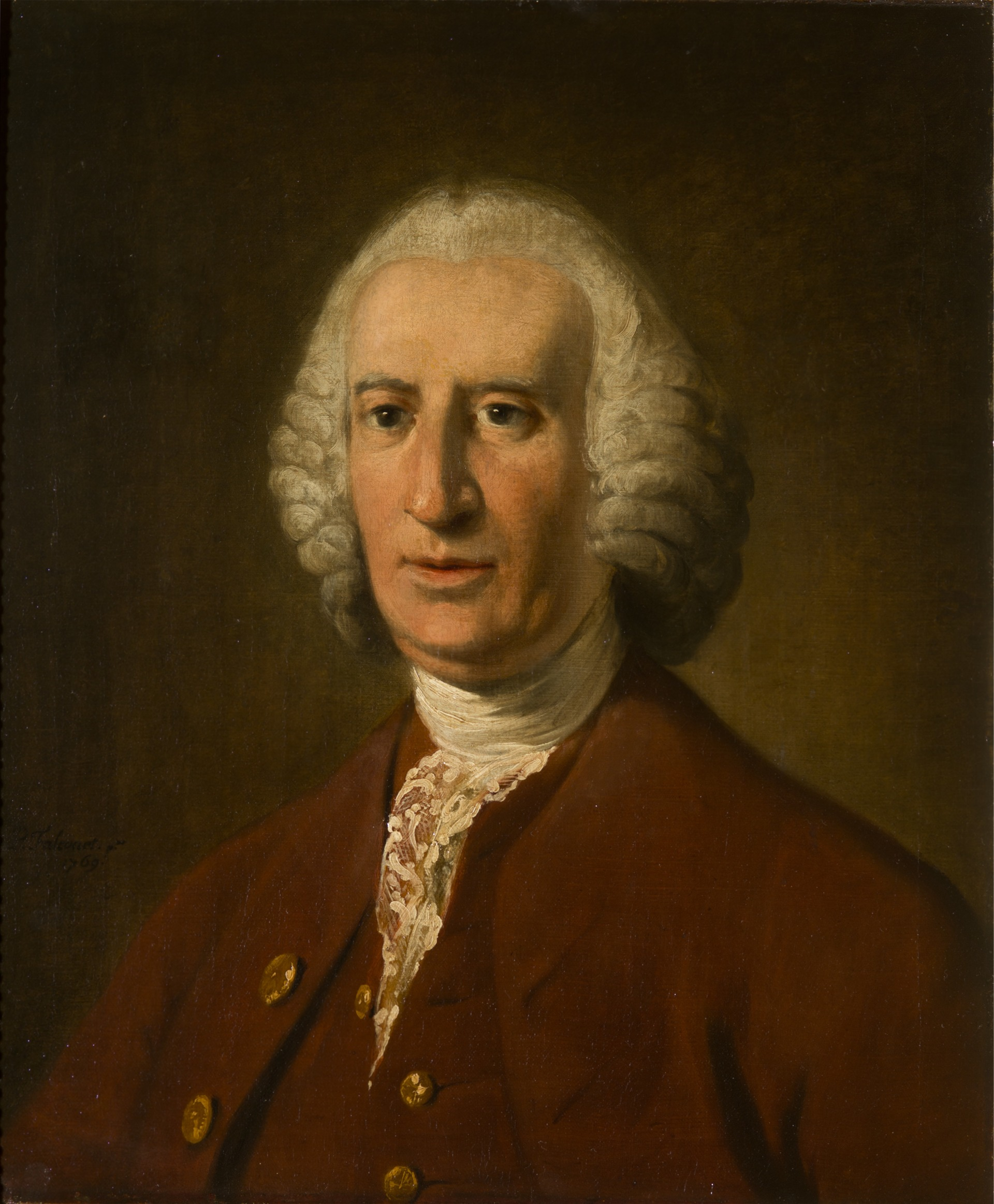
Hugh Hume-Campbell, 3rd Earl of Marchmont served as Governor of the Bank of Scotland from 1763–1790

The Bank of Scotland was suspected of Jacobite sympathies. Its first rival, the Royal Bank of Scotland, was formed by royal charter in 1727. This led to a period of great competition between the two banks as they tried to drive each other out of business. Although the "Bank Wars" ended in around 1751, competition soon arose from other sources, as other Scottish banks were founded throughout the country. In response, the Bank of Scotland itself began to open branches throughout Scotland.

Following the Acts of Union in 1707, the bank supervised the reminting of the old Scottish coinage into Sterling. It was one of the first banks in Europe to print its own banknotes, and it continues to print its own sterling banknotes under legal arrangements that allow Scottish banks to issue currency. The bank also took the lead in establishing the security and stability of the entire Scottish banking system, which became more important after the insolvency of Alexander Fordyce and collapse of the Ayr Bank in 1772, in the crisis following the collapse of the London house of Neal, James, Fordyce and Down.

Henry Dundas was Governor of the Bank of Scotland from 1790 to 1811. As well as governor, he was also Home Secretary in William Pitt the Younger's government. In 1792, Dundas was successful in passing the Slave Trade Bill in the House of Commons. The bank was housed in the southern (1588) section of the Gourlay house on Melbourne Place before being moved to the customised bank building on the Mound in 1805.

The Western Bank collapsed in 1857, and the Bank of Scotland stepped in with the other Scottish banks to ensure that all the Western Bank's notes were paid. The first branch in London opened in 1865.

=== 20th century ===
In the 1950s, the Bank of Scotland was involved in several mergers and acquisitions with different banks. In 1955, the Bank merged with the Union Bank of Scotland. The Bank also expanded into consumer credit with the purchase of Chester-based, North West Securities (Later Capital Bank). In 1971, the Bank agreed to merge with the British Linen Bank, owned by Barclays Bank. The merger saw Barclays Bank acquire a 35% stake in the Bank of Scotland, a stake it retained until the 1990s.

In 1959, the Bank of Scotland became the first bank in the UK to install a computer to process accounts centrally. At 11:00 on 25 January 1985, the Bank of Scotland introduced HOBS (Home and Office Banking Services), an early example of remote access technology being made available to banking customers. This followed a small-scale service operated jointly with the Nottingham Building Society for two years but developed by the Bank of Scotland. The new HOBS service enabled customers to access their accounts directly on a television screen, using the Prestel telephone network.

=== International expansion ===
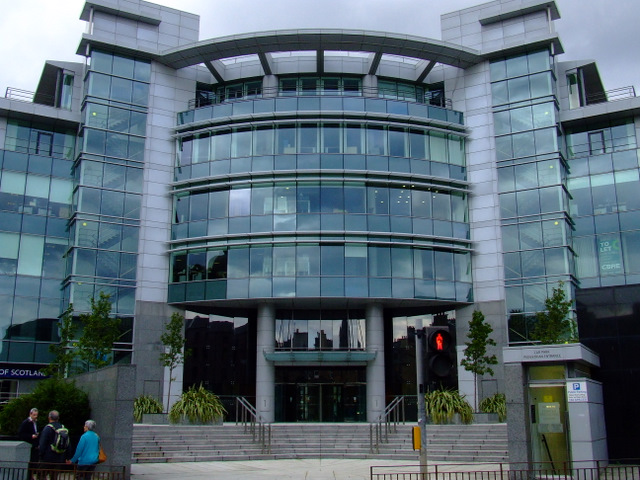
Bank of Scotland offices in central Edinburgh

The arrival of North Sea oil to Scotland in the 1970s allowed the Bank of Scotland to expand into the energy sector. The bank later used this expertise in energy finance to expand internationally. The first international office opened in Houston, Texas, followed by more in the United States, Moscow and Singapore. In 1987, the bank acquired Countrywide Bank of New Zealand (later sold to Lloyds TSB in 1998). In 1995 the bank expanded into the Australian market by acquiring Perth based Bankwest.

A controversial period in the bank's history was the attempt in 1999 to enter the United States retail banking market via a joint venture with evangelist Pat Robertson. The move was met with criticism from civil rights groups in the UK, owing to Robertson's controversial views on homosexuality. The bank was forced to cancel the deal when Robertson described Scotland as a "dark land overrun by homosexuals".

=== HBOS ===
Headquarters of the Bank of Scotland, located on The Mound, at North Bank Street, Edinburgh (The street is named in honour of the bank having moved there in 1806.)

In the late 1990s, the UK financial sector market underwent a period of consolidation on a large scale. Many of the large building societies were demutualising and becoming banks in their own right or merging with existing banks. For instance Lloyds Bank and TSB Bank merged in 1995 to create Lloyds TSB. In 1999, the Bank of Scotland made a takeover bid for National Westminster Bank. Since the Bank of Scotland was significantly smaller than the English-based NatWest, the move was seen as an audacious and risky move. However, The Royal Bank of Scotland tabled a rival offer, and a bitter takeover battle ensued, with the Royal Bank the victor.

In 2000, the Bank of Scotland became the first bank in the United Kingdom to introduce the concept of mobile banking, using WAP mobile phones. A simple and basic concept, the system allowed customers to only access account information, but it has been credited since for paving the way for the advancement and increased usage of mobile banking. The Bank of Scotland was now the centre of other merger opportunities. A proposal to merge with the Abbey National was explored, but later rejected. In 2001, the Bank of Scotland and the Halifax agreed a merger to form HBOS ("Halifax Bank of Scotland").

In 2006, HBOS secured the passing of the HBOS Group Reorganisation Act 2006, a local act of Parliament that would allow the group to operate within a simplified structure. The act allowed HBOS to make the Governor and Company of the Bank of Scotland a public limited company, Bank of Scotland plc, which became the principal banking subsidiary of HBOS. Halifax plc and Capital Bank plc transferred their undertakings to Bank of Scotland plc, and although the Halifax brand name was retained, Halifax then began to operate under the latter company's UK banking licence. Capital Bank branding was phased out.

The provisions in the act were implemented on 17 September 2007. In 2008, HBOS Group agreed to be taken over by Lloyds TSB Group during the Great Recession.

== Central Bank of Scotland ==
In the event of Scottish independence, the constitutional role the Bank of Scotland would play remains largely unclear, and whether the bank would become the central bank of Scotland following independence. One proposal in the event of Scottish independence would be for Scotland to establish a new currency, the Scottish pound, which would be printed by the Central Bank of Scotland. As the Bank of Scotland, along with the other two commercial banks in Scotland – the Royal Bank of Scotland and Clydesdale Bank – are permitted to issue their own banknotes of the Pound sterling, it would be likely that the Bank of Scotland would retain its ability to do so if it were not to become the central bank of the country. During campaigning ahead of the 2014 Scottish independence referendum, the Scottish Government campaigned for Scotland to retain the Pound sterling as its currency and establish a currency union with the United Kingdom.

In subsequent government proposal papers regarding independence, the Scottish Government has confirmed that the government's preferred method would be that the Bank of Scotland would not become the Central Bank of Scotland, but rather, a new Scottish Reserve Bank would be established instead and assume the role of the central bank of the country. The Bank of Scotland would retain its status as a commercial and clearing bank.

== Sponsorships ==
The Bank of Scotland sponsored the Scottish Premier League from its inception in 1998, until the end of the 2006–2007 Scottish Premier League season, following its decision to not renew the deal in favour of investing in grassroots sport instead. Additionally, the bank sponsored Scottish Athletics for a number of years. Since November 2010, the Bank of Scotland Foundation has invested over £32 million to around 2,500 charities in Scotland, reaching roughly 1.2 million people by providing financial support to local services and personal support services.

== Banknotes ==
=== Banknote history ===
Although the Bank of Scotland today is not a central bank, it retains the right (along with two other Scottish commercial banks) to issue pound sterling banknotes to this day. These notes are equal in value to notes issued by the Bank of England, the central bank of the United Kingdom.

The Bank of Scotland was the first European bank to issue paper currency redeemable for cash on demand (which was an extremely useful facility given the poor state of the Scottish coinage at the end of the 17th century) on a sustainable basis after the earlier failed attempt of the Swedish Stockholms Banco in 1661–64. Following the Acts of Union in 1707, the bank supervised the reminting of the old Scottish coinage into Sterling. Up until the middle of the 19th century, privately owned banks in Great Britain and Ireland were permitted to issue their own banknotes, and money issued by provincial Scottish, English, Welsh and Irish banking companies circulated freely as a means of payment. The Bank of Scotland still produces its own banknotes, and is the longest continuous issuer of banknotes in the world. In 2022, the Bank of Scotland revealed the design of its £100 polymer note. The design was the first to commemorate the contribution of an influential person from Scotland, the suffragette and medical pioneer, Dr Flora Murray.

In 1826, there was outrage in Scotland at the attempt of the United Kingdom Parliament to prevent the production of banknotes of less than five pounds face value. Sir Walter Scott wrote a series of letters to the Edinburgh Weekly Journal under the pseudonym "Malachi Malagrowther", which provoked such a response that the government was forced to relent and allow the Scottish banks to continue printing £1 notes.

=== 1995 Tercentenary series ===
The Tercentenary Series £50 note (1995)

Bank of Scotland's previous note issue was in 1995, known as the Tercentenary Series as they were issued in the year of the three hundredth anniversary of the foundation of the bank. Each denomination features Sir Walter Scott on the front, and on the back are representations of industries that Scotland excels in:

- £5 note featuring a vignette of oil and energy
- £10 note featuring a vignette of distilling and brewing
- £20 note featuring a vignette of education and research
- £50 note featuring a vignette of arts and culture
- £100 note featuring a vignette of leisure and tourism.

These notes are no longer in circulation.

=== 2007 Bridges series ===
A £20 note of the 2007 issue

Bank of Scotland began issuing a new series of banknotes in the Autumn of 2007, which feature the common theme of Scottish bridges. It will take at least three years for the current issue of Bank of Scotland notes to be phased out of circulation. In keeping with the bank's tradition, the front of the notes depict an image of Sir Walter Scott; the image on the 2007 series is based on the portrait of Scott painted by Henry Raeburn.

Some new security features have also been added to the new design. These include a metallic security thread embedded in every banknote, which contains the numerical value of the note and the note's bridge image. A new hologram and foil patch has been introduced on the front of the £20, £50 and £100 notes, which features the Bank of Scotland logo and the numerical value of the note.

- £5 note features the Brig o' Doon
- £10 note features the Glenfinnan Viaduct
- £20 note features the Forth Bridge
- £50 note features the Falkirk Wheel
- £100 note features the Kessock Bridge

On 1 March 2018 the Bank of Scotland decided to withdraw all of its paper £5 and £10 notes, and fully replace them with its polymer equivalents (see below).

=== 2016 Polymer series ===
Bank of Scotland began issuing new banknotes on polymer in 2016, beginning with the £5 note. The main theme of the bridges of Scotland are kept for this series, but have been redesigned to incorporate additional design features. The portrait of Sir Walter Scott by Henry Raeburn is the same as the 2007 issues, but have been shifted from the centre to the right side of the notes. The bank's headquarters, "The Mound" is featured at the centre of the note. The size of the notes for this series is also reduced.

- £5 note features Brig o' Doon
- £10 note features Glenfinnan Viaduct
- £20 note features the Forth Bridge and a commemorative £20 note features the Queensferry Crossing
- £50 note features Falkirk Wheel and The Kelpies
- £100 note features Flora Murray

== Governors of the Bank of Scotland ==
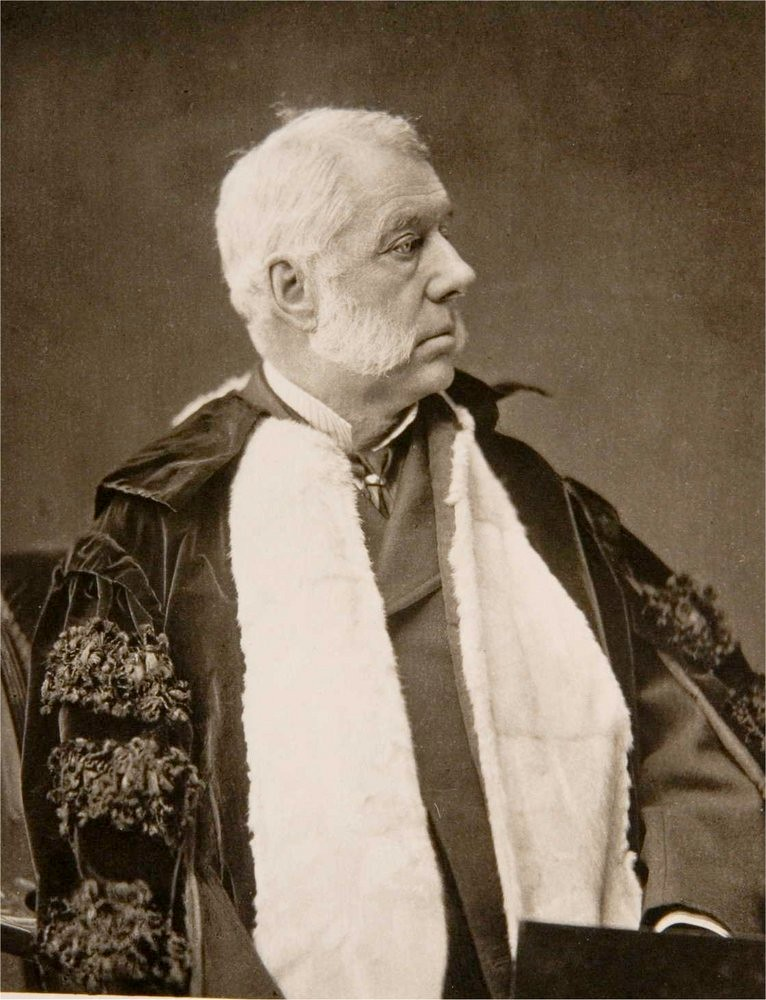
John Dalrymple, 10th Earl of Stair, Governor (1870–1903)

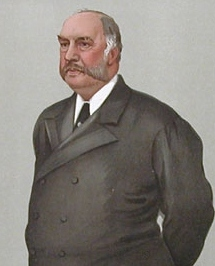
Alexander Bruce, 6th Lord Balfour of Burleigh, Governor (1904–1921)

1. John Holland 1696–1697
2. David Melville, 3rd Earl of Leven 1697–1728
3. Alexander Hume, 2nd Earl of Marchmont 1728–1740
4. Charles Hope, 1st Earl of Hopetoun 1740–1742
5. Colonel John Stratton 1742
6. John Hay, 4th Marquess of Tweeddale 1742–1762
7. Hugh Hume, 3rd Earl of Marchmont 1763–1790
8. Henry Dundas, 1st Viscount Melville 1790–1811
9. Robert Dundas, 2nd Viscount Melville 1812–1851
10. James Broun Ramsay, 1st Marquess of Dalhousie 1851–1860
11. John Campbell, 2nd Marquess of Breadalbane 1861–1862
12. George Hamilton-Baillie, 11th Earl of Haddington 1863–1870
13. John Dalrymple, 10th Earl of Stair 1870–1903
14. Alexander Bruce, 6th Lord Balfour of Burleigh 1904–1921
15. William Mure 1921–1924
16. Sidney Elphinstone, 16th Lord Elphinstone 1924–1955
17. Sir John Craig 1955–1957
18. Steven Bilsland, 1st Baron Bilsland 1957–1966
19. Henry Hepburne-Scott, 10th Lord Polwarth 1966–1972
20. Ronald Colville, 2nd Baron Clydesmuir 1972–1981
21. Sir Thomas Risk 1981–1991
22. Sir Bruce Pattullo 1991–1998
23. Sir Alistair Grant 1998–1999
24. Sir John Shaw 1999–2001
25. Sir Peter Burt 2001–2003
26. George Mitchell 2003–2006
27. Dennis Stevenson, Baron Stevenson of Coddenham 2006– 2007

== See also ==
- Banknotes of Scotland
- List of banks
- William Paterson (banker)
- Museum on the Mound
