= Capital Bank (Haiti) =

- Type: Private
- Industry: Banking
- Founded: 1986
- Headquarters: 38, rue Faubert; Pétion-Ville, Haiti
- Key people: Bernard P. Roy, Chairman and CEO
- Revenue: US$ 34.3 million (Sept.2019)
- Net income: US$ 11.9 million (Sept.2019)
- Total assets: US$ 329.3 million (Sept.2019)
- Number of employees: 790 (Sept.2019)
- Website: www.capitalbankhaiti.com

Capital Bank, S.A. is a commercial bank based in Pétion-Ville, Haiti. In terms of assets, it is Haiti's third-largest private commercial bank.

== History ==
The bank started its operations in 1986 as a Savings and Loan institution under the name Banque de Crédit immobilier (BCI). In 1999, it changed its charter to become a full-fledged commercial bank operating under the name Capital Bank. As of 2016, Capital Bank has 22 branches throughout Haiti. In addition to its commercial banking operations, Capital Bank is present in the following specific financial areas:

- Capital Immobilier - Real Estate
- Capinvest - Investments

Fondation Capital Bank is the social and philanthropic arm of the bank.
