= Themsie Times =

South African actress (1949–2021)

- Born: themsi times aka MA Jordan; 22 September 1949; Port Elizabeth, Cape Province, South Africa (now Eastern Cape)
- Died: 9 December 2021 (aged 72); Johannesburg, Gauteng, South Africa
- Other names: Temsie Times; Themsie Times
- Occupation: Actress
- Years active: 1986–2021

Themsie Times (22 September 1949 – 9 December 2021), sometimes credited as Temsie Times, was a South African film and television actress.

== Early life ==
She was born in Port Elizabeth, Cape Province in what was then the Union of South Africa, the youngest of seven siblings.

== Career ==
Times's screen work included appearances in three films and she also appeared as Maria Zibula in 7de Laan, a television soap opera, being one of the show's regular characters.

=== Filmography ===
Year	Film	Role	Genre
1986	Allan Quatermain and the Lost City of Gold	Nurse	adventure
1997	Dangerous Ground	Black Hooker (credited as Temsie Times)	thriller
2003	Stander	Shebeen queen (credited as Themsie Times)	biographical

== Personal life ==
In September 2008, she was living and working in Johannesburg, Gauteng, South Africa.

Times died on 9 December 2021, at the age of 72.
