= Zondo =

Zondo is a surname. Notable people with the surname include:

- Dudu Zondo (born 1994), South African cricketer
- Khabo Zondo (born 1961), South African football coach
- Khaya Zondo (born 1990), South African cricketer
- Raymond Zondo (born 1960), South African judge

== See also ==
- Zondo Commission
