= Oscar Mgudlwa =

South African actor and comedian

Oscar “Madluphuthu” Mgudlwa
- Born: Oscar Mgudlwa; 29 December 1975; Daveyton, Ekurhuleni, Gauteng, South Africa
- Died: 16 July 2025 (aged 49); Johannesburg area, South Africa
- Occupation: Actor · Comedian · Musician
- Years active: 1990s–2025
- Known for: “Madluphuthu” film series, township comedy

Oscar “Madluphuthu” Mgudlwa (29 December 1975 – 16 July 2025) was a South African actor, comedian, and musician best known for his portrayal of “Madluphuthu”, a character celebrated in early-2000s township direct-to-DVD film series. His work became a hallmark of township entertainment culture in South Africa.

== Early life and musical beginnings ==
Mgudlwa hailed from Daveyton on the East Rand, Ekurhuleni, in Gauteng province. He first entered the entertainment industry as a musician, releasing an album with the group Man Child in 1998 and collaborating with Mapaputsi in 2001.

== Acting career ==
Mgudlwa achieved fame with a string of low-budget, township-oriented films produced by Sello Chicco Twala and distributed on DVD in the mid-2000s. Among them were titles such as My Sh*t Father, My Lotto Ticket, and the series Madluphuthu 1 & 2. His signature character, oversized teeth, exaggerated naivety, and township vernacular, resonated with township audiences and made his films popular in DVD markets. In later years, he appeared on the TV drama Isitha: The Enemy, as “Jupiter”, and continued to collaborate in film and television productions.

== Legacy ==
Mgudlwa's Madluphuthu persona became iconic in South Africa's township entertainment scene, particularly in the era when low-budget DVDs were widely consumed and accessible in township environments. His work is often cited as part of the township comedic tradition, bridging raw humor and local life realities.

== Death ==
On 16 July 2025, Mgudlwa died after a short illness, after experiencing breathing difficulties. He was 50 years old. His passing was confirmed by his son, Asanda Mgudlwa. His brother, Sipho Mgudlwa, said that Mgudlwa's death came as a shock to the family. Tributes poured in from fans and industry colleagues, recognising the impact of his memorable character and his ability to entertain township audiences. Amid his death, filmmaker Aaron Ngwasheng said they had been working on a new project together.
