= Mpanza =

Mpanza is a South African surname that may refer to the following notable people:

- James Mpanza (1889–1970), South African social activist
- Terence Mpanza (born 1964), South African politician
