= John Holland (banker) =

English merchant and banker, founder of the Bank of Scotland (1658–1722)

John Holland (1658–1722) was an English banker. He is best known as the founder of the Bank of Scotland in 1695.

== Life ==
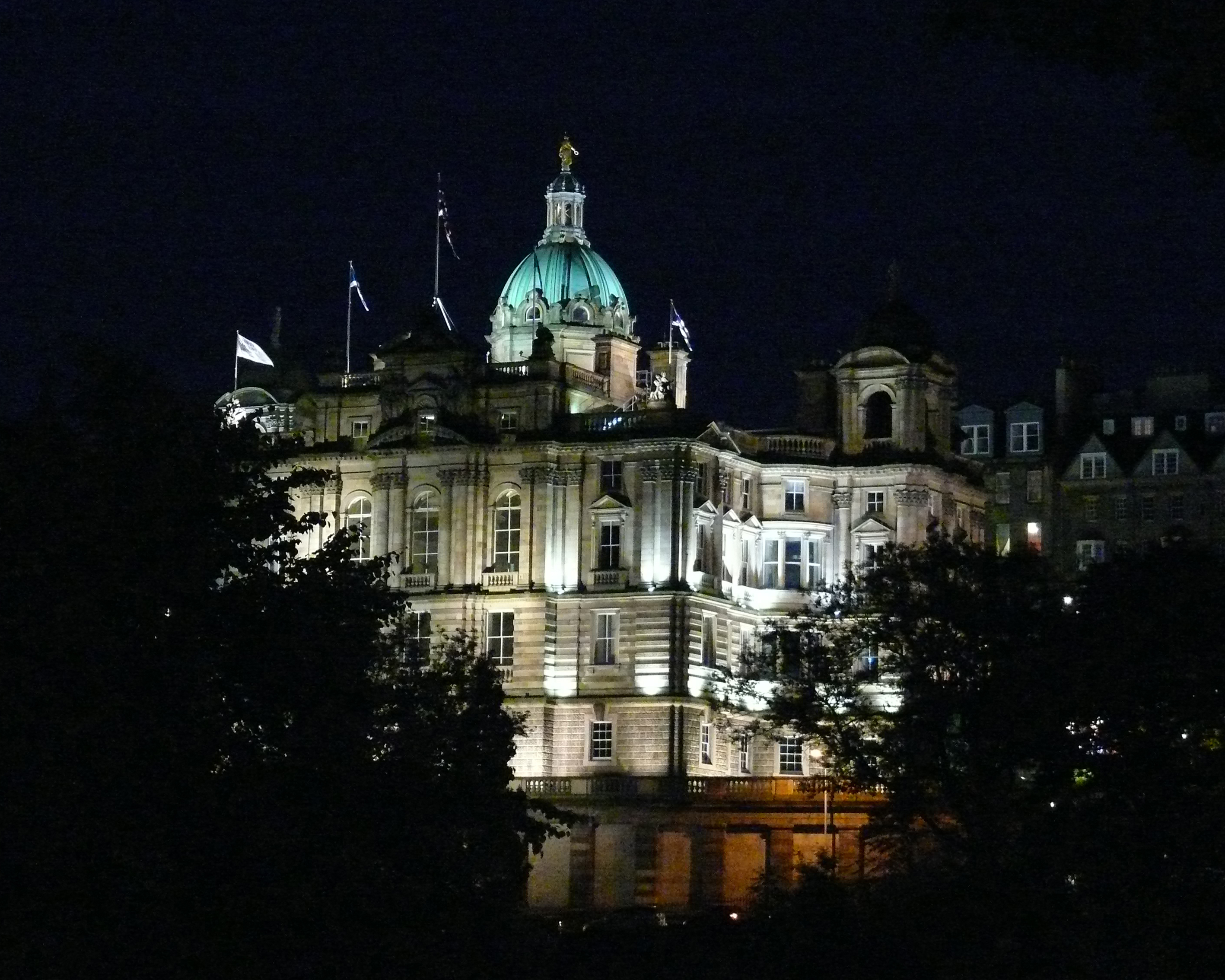
The headquarters of the Bank of Scotland in Edinburgh, founded by Holland in 1695

Little is known of Holland's early life except that he was born in 1658 in the Precinct of Bridewell in the City of London; all marriage and baptismal registers from this time were destroyed in the Great Fire of London in 1666. John Holland was the son of a mariner, Philip Holland, a friend of Samuel Pepys who served as captain of English ship Assurance during the Baltic Expedition of 1659.

Holland was a merchant of the Staple, and probably a member of the Mercers' Company, London. He had partially retired when, on the suggestion of a Scottish friend, he projected the Bank of Scotland which was established by act of the Scottish parliament in 1695, in the name of the Governor and Company of the Bank of Scotland. The new bank opened its first branches in 1696. Holland was elected the first governor, and ultimately possessed seventy-four shares. One of the directors was James Foulis, with whom Holland had been associated in a scheme for introducing the manufacture of Colchester baizes into Scotland in June 1693.

The bank made at first slow progress, with opposition from the African Company, which started a banking business in defiance of the bank's charter, and from the Bank of England. Holland managed the bank successfully through the early difficulties. In recognition of his services, the company presented him with a silver cistern, which in his will he directed to be reserved as a family heirloom. With his son Richard he drew up a scheme for the establishment of a bank in Ireland. He died at Brewood Hall, Staffordshire, in 1722, and was buried in the church there.

== Family ==
Holland married Jane, only daughter, by his second wife, of Walter Fowke, M.D., of Brewood and Little Wyrley, Staffordshire, by whom he had two sons, Richard Holland (a physician) and Fowke.

== Notes ==
Attribution

This article incorporates text from a publication now in the public domain: Lee, Sidney, ed. (1891). "Holland, John (d.1722)". Dictionary of National Biography. Vol. 27. London: Smith, Elder & Co.
