= Thobani Nzuza =

South African actor and singer

- Born: Thobani Nzuza; 4 May 1993 (age 33); KwaZulu-Natal, South Africa
- Education: King Shaka High School
- Alma mater: Durban University of Technology
- Occupations: Actor, Director, Playwright, Vocalist, Dancer
- Years active: 2010–present
- Spouse: L X
- Children: 0

Thobani Nzuza (born 4 May 1993) is a South African actor, director, playwright, vocalist and dancer. He is best known for the roles in the television serials eHostela, Uzalo and DiepCity.

== Personal life ==
Nzuza was born on 4 May 1993 in Umlazi township in KwaZulu-Natal, South Africa. In 2011, he matriculated from King Shaka High School. After that, in 2013, he attended the Durban University of Technology, and graduated with a bachelor's degree in drama in 2016.

== Career ==
In 2010, he studied drama by joining the Community Arts Center. During this period, he got the opportunity to learn drama acting under renowned artist Buhle 'Bo' Mlazi. In 2014, he made his acting debut with the stage play Silencing the Hurricanes produced by Themi Venturas. The play was performed in Bangkok. After the success, he later wrote and directed the stage play Shintsha Guluva for the Isigcawu Festival. The play received critics acclaim and Nzuza won the Best Director award as well.

In 2015, he performed in the stage play Secret Valley of the Great Kings produced by Menzi Mkhwane. He was later nominated for Best Supporting Actor at the Durban Mercury Theatre Awards. Then he collaborated with Kagiso Tsimakwane to write and directed the play of first one-man show titled Boy Ntulikazi in 2015, which received many awards. At the 2015 Isigcawu Festival, he won the Best Actor Award, then won Best Actor Award at the 2017 Baxter Zabalaza Theatre Festival. The play also won the Best Production Award at the 2017 Baxter Zabalaza Theatre Festival as well as Best Community Production Award at the South African Theatre Magazine Awards.

In 2016, Thobani represented Shakespeare festival in Germany with the plays Much Ado about Nothing, directed by Debbie Lutge. In 2018, he played the role of "Mdeni" in the Mzansi Magic drama serial eHostela. After that popularity, he joined with the e.tv supernatural telenovela Isipho, with the role "Lwandle" in 2019. In the same year, he played the role "Khehla" in the soapie Uzalo. In 2021, he appeared in the serial DiepCity with the role "Simangaliso Xaba".

== Filmography ==
Year	Film	Role	Genre	Ref.
2018	eHostela	Mndeni	TV series	
2019	Isipho	Lwandle	TV series	
2019	Uzalo	Khehla	TV series	
2021	DiepCity	Simangaliso Xaba	TV series	
2023	Isitha: The Enemy	Chuma & Lazarus	TV series	
