= Mbali Ngiba =

South African actress and singer

- Born: Mbali Ngiba; South Africa
- Occupations: Actress, Singer
- Years active: 2013–present

Mbali Ngiba is a South African actress and singer.

== Career ==
In 2013, she made her television debut with the role of "Linda" in the Mzansi Magic anthology miniseries Abangani. In the same year, she acted in the direct-to-video film The Right with the role "Zodwa". Then she did a cameo role in the SABC1 soapie Generations. In 2016, she joined with the Mzansi Magic telenovela Greed & Desire and played the role "Welile". After that, she played the minor role of "Emergency Nurse" in the e.tv drama Easy Money. In 2018, she joined with the second season of Mzansi Magic telenovela Isithembiso to play the role "Buhle". In the same year, she made the minor role "Lab Technician" in another Mzansi Magic telenovela The River. In 2020, she appeared in the etv. medical drama Durban Gen with the role of "Mrs Mthembu".

== Filmography ==
Year	Film	Role	Genre	Ref.
2013	Abangani	Linda	TV series	
2013	The Right	Zodwa	TV movie	
	Generations	Guest role	TV series	
2016	Greed & Desire	Welile	TV series	
2017	Easy Money	Emergency Nurse	TV series	
2018	Isithembiso	Buhle	TV series	
2018	The River	Lab Technician	TV series	
2020	Durban Gen	Mrs Mthembu	TV series	

2023 || "Umkhokha: The curse" ||Zodwa || TV Series||
