= Capital Bank plc =

British bank

Capital Bank plc (North West Securities)
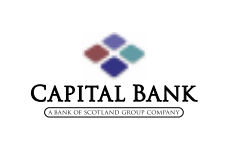
- Capital Bank Logo (1997-2006)
- Type: Public company
- Industry: Finance, Banking
- Founded: 1945
- Fate: Assets transferred to Bank of Scotland (2007)
- Successor: Bank of Scotland
- Headquarters: Chester
- Total assets: £21.3 billion (2006)
- Owner: HBOS plc

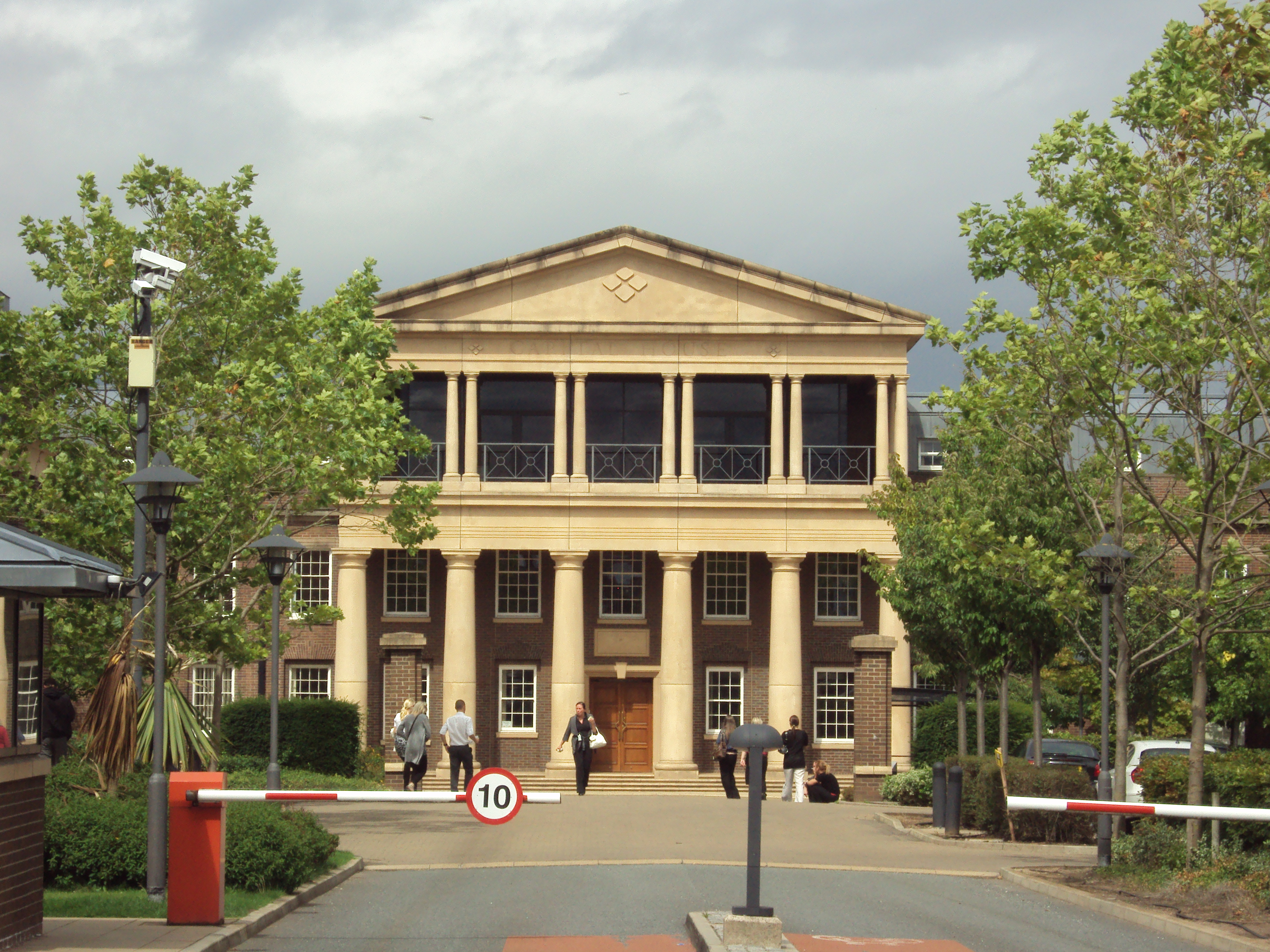
Capital House, Handbridge, Chester

Capital Bank plc was a subsidiary bank of the Bank of Scotland and HBOS. Its head offices were located in Chester, England. Its main products were leasing, installment credit, vehicle finance and mortgages. In the late 20th century, it became Chester's largest employer.

== History ==
The bank was founded in a hotel room in Chester by Sydney Alfred Jones as North West Securities in 1945. In 1958 North West Securities was purchased by the Bank of Scotland as the latter expanded into consumer credit. North West Securities continued to grow in size, reaching £1.3 billion in assets in 1987 and, with Bank of Scotland exercising greater control, it became a public limited company in 1989. North West Securities was also renamed North West Securities Bank around this time and, in the late 20th century, it became Chester's largest employer. It also provided financial support to Chester Cathedral.

In 1997 the bank was renamed Capital Bank plc and moved to its new headquarters at Capital House, (now Churchill House), the former Western Command headquarters in Handbridge, Chester. The building was heavily modified and updated during this time with the concrete pillar façade being added along with the Bridge House building. Capital Bank became part of the HBOS Group when Bank and Scotland and Halifax merged in 2001. Capital Bank continued to grow its corporate banking activity until 2006, when assets totalled almost £22 billion. In the same year the HBOS Group Reorganisation Act 2006 was passed through the UK Parliament. This allowed the HBOS Group, which included other financial institutions and banks to consolidate Halifax plc, Capital Bank plc, and HBOS Treasury Services plc into one company, Bank of Scotland plc. The vehicle leasing operation of Capital Bank was subsequently absorbed into Bank of Scotland Dealer Finance ('BOSDF').

Some Capital Bank subsidiaries, including the mortgage lender, The Mortgage Business plc which held approximately £9 billion in mortgage assets, continued to operate as a separate company until the 2008 recession. The Mortgage Business issued no new mortgages after 2008 and only manages already issued mortgages.

Capital House was retained as offices for Bank of Scotland; when Lloyds acquired HBOS, Capital House was no longer needed owing to Lloyds having offices at Charterhall Drive, Chester. After vacating the site in 2010, Lloyds sold the former Capital Bank buildings to the University of Chester in 2015.
