= Xoli Zondi =

South African actress

- Born: Xolisile Zondi; 17 September 1983 (age 42); Mpumalanga, South Africa
- Other name: Xoli Zondi-Zamisa
- Education: Durban University of Technology
- Occupations: Actress, Model
- Years active: 2004–present
- Spouse: Phiwokuhle Zamisa (m. 2017)
- Children: 2

Xolisile Zamisa (Née Zondi), or just Xoli Zondi-Zamisa (born 17 September 1983), is a South African actress and model. She is best known for the roles in the television serials Family Bonds, Generations and Single Galz.

== Personal life ==
Zondi's zodiac sign is Virgo.

Zondi was born on 17 September 1983 in Hammarsdale, South Africa. She completed a diploma in drama studies from the Durban University of Technology in 2003.

She has one daughter named Mandy from a relationship at very young age, where she got pregnant at the age of 16.

Xoli Zondi married Phiwokuhle Zamisa, a ward councillor in Umzumbe, KwaZulu-Natal, in a traditional ceremony at his Turton family home on December 2, 2017. The wedding followed a decade-long relationship that included a temporary separation in 2012 and a subsequent reconciliation. The ceremony was attended by family and colleagues, including actors Mandla Gaduka and Nthati Moshesh. The couple has one daughter, Ukusa Zamisa who was born on 26 October 2018.

== Career ==
In 2004, he started acting in theatre dramas. In 2006, she joined with the SABC1 sitcom Family Bonds and played the role "Winnie". The serial became very popular, where she continued to play the role until 2009. After that, she played the popular role of "Zodwa Mabena" in the SABC1 soap opera Generations from 2010 to 2014. For this role, she was nominated for the Outstanding Supporting Actress Award at the 2013 Royalty Soapie Awards. In 2013, she appeared in the sixth episode "Hamba Voetsek" of the season 5 of e.tv anthology serial eKasi: Our Stories with the role of "Smangele". In 2014, she starred the role as "Ntsiki", in the SABC1 sitcom Single Galz.

In 2016, she played the supportive role of "Nqobile Gigaba" in the Mzansi Magic's drama series, Greed and Desire. In 2020, she joined with e.tv drama serial, Imbewu with the mentally ill character "Violet".

== Filmography ==
Year	Film	Role	Genre	Ref.
2006	Family Bonds	Winnie	TV series	
2010	Generations	Zodwa Mabena	TV series	
2013	eKasi: Our Stories	Smangele	TV series	
2014	Zaziwa	Herself	TV series	
2014	Mzansi Love	Londiwe	TV series	
2014	Single Galz	Ntsiki	TV series	
2015	Him, Her & the Guys	Ntombi Mkhize	TV series	
2015	Zabalaza	Amahle	TV series	
2016	Greed and Desire	Nqobile Gigaba	TV series	
2017	Easy Money	Khosi	TV series	
2019	Isipho	Nkanyezi Shezi	TV series	
2021	Imbewu: The Seed	Violeta Vilakazi	TV Series	
