= Bhambatha =

Zulu chief of the amaZondi clan (born c. 1865)

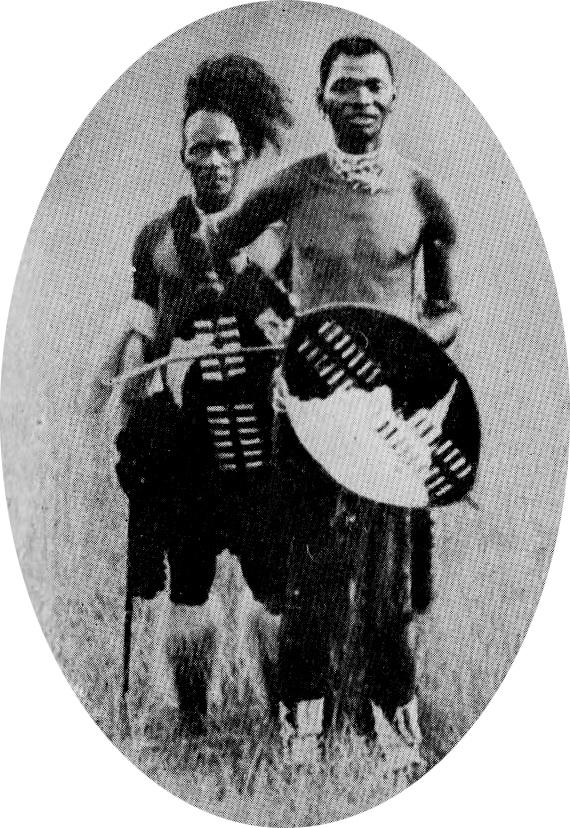
- Bhambatha (on the right) with an attendant
- Born: c.1865 Mpanza, Natal Colony or Zulu Kingdom
- Died: unknown
- Spouse: Siyekiwe
- Issue: Somveli, Seyama, Mngoye, Sonkonde, Ngungumbana, Mthakathi, Mgcobo, Khuzwayo, Shuqu, Manqe
- Father: Mancinza
- Mother: Mabamba kaDonda
- Occupation: King of the Zondi

Bambata, or Bhambatha kaMancinza (c. 1865–1906?), also known as Mbata Bhambatha, was a Zulu chief of the amaZondi clan in the Colony of Natal and son of Mancinza. He led an armed rebellion in 1906 when the poll tax was raised from a tax per hut to per head (£1 tax on all native men older than 18), increasing hardship during a severe economic depression. Bhambatha claimed that he was told to lead the rebellion by the de facto Zulu King Dinizulu. Dinizulu disputed this account and no convincing evidence for either story is available.

== Early years ==
It is not known exactly what year Bhambatha was born due to a lack of written records and birth certificates, but it is believed to have been in 1865, in Mpanza, near the town of Greytown, Natal Colony. He was the son of Chief Macinza, sometimes called Macinga, of the abakwa Zondi chieftaincy; and his mother, principle wife of Mancinza, was the daughter of Chief Phakade, chief of an important Zulu chieftaincy, the Chunu. Bhambatha was one of the 10,000 Zulu warriors to guard Shaka Zulu's mother's grave for a year. He is said to have been a Zulu warrior under the strict Shaka Zulu Impi training and discipline.

== The rebellion ==
Bamatha led an armed rebellion in 1906 when the poll tax was raised from a tax per hut to per head (£1 tax on all native men older than 18), increasing hardship during a severe economic depression.

The Natal Police believed Bhambatha was going to resist the tax with force and sent about 150 men to arrest him, but the police were ambushed and four policemen killed. Thousands of colonial troops were then sent after him, including cavalry and heavy artillery, leading to 3,500 casualties. The Natal colonial government claimed Bhambatha was killed in action in the Battle of Mome Gorge, while it is commonly believed among the Zulu people that he fled and eventually settled in Mozambique. He is often credited as an inspiration to South Africans during the anti-apartheid movement.
