= Bambatha Rebellion =

1906 Zulu uprising in the colony of Natal

Bambatha rebellion
- Part of the aftermath of the Anglo-Zulu War
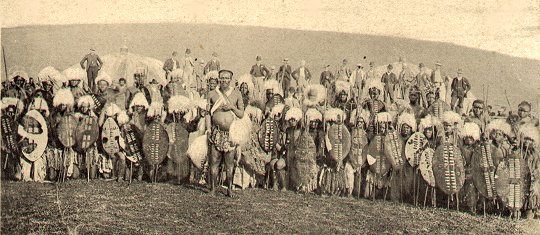
- Zulu warriors
Date	1906
Location	Natal, South Africa
Result	British victory

Belligerents
United Kingdom: Natal Colony; Transvaal Colony; Cape Colony	amaZondi and amaCube clans of the Zulu people

Commanders and leaders
Colonel Duncan McKenzie	Chief Bambatha kaMancinza

Strength
4,316 soldiers (including 2,978 militiamen)	Unknown

Casualties and losses
36 (including 6 levies)	3,000 to 4,000 killed

The Bambatha Rebellion (also known as the Zulu Rebellion) was a 1906 uprising against colonial rule in the British colony of Natal led by the Zulu chief Bhambatha, who lived in the Mpanza Valley (now a district near Greytown). It was sparked by unpopular taxation policies levied by the Natal colonial administration, which exacerbated ongoing economic crises. The suppression of the rebellion by colonial forces resulted in the deaths of 3,000-4,000 AmaZulu men and 36 colonial soldiers, and led to an uptick in support among white colonists in Southern Africa for uniting the various colonies in the region in order to maintain white supremacy. The Union of South Africa was subsequently formed in 1910.

== Rebellion ==
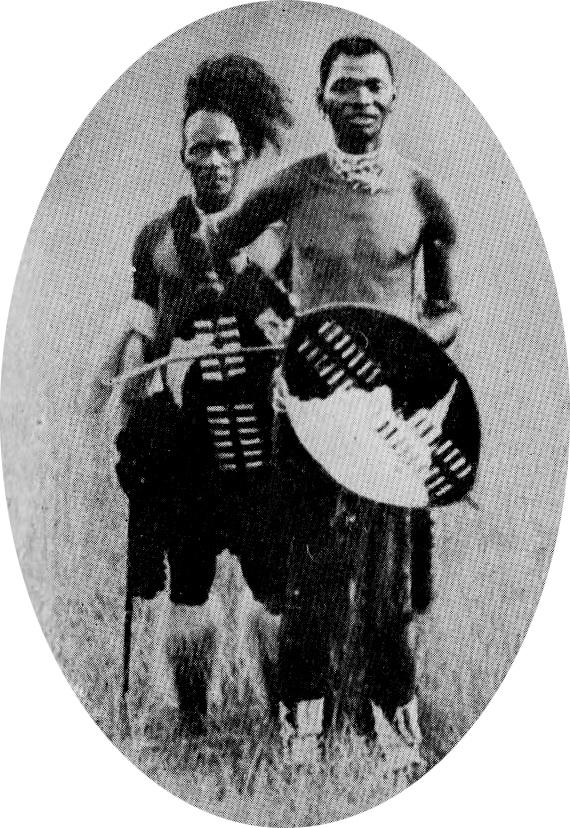
Bhambatha (right) with an attendant

In the years following the end of the Second Boer War in 1902, European employers in the British colony of Natal had difficulty recruiting Black farmers due to increased competition from gold mines in the Witwatersrand. Colonial authorities in Natal introduced a poll tax of £1 (equivalent to £110 in 2025) in addition to the existing hut tax to pressure Zulu men into entering the labour market. The tax was highly regressive, and disproportionately affected poorer households. This was exacerbated by Africans experiencing a wider economic crisis, as European landowners evicted African tenants to work the land themselves (leading to overcrowding on the small lands reserved for the African majority), and various natural disasters, such as an 1896–1897 epidemic which killed 90% of local cattle.

In 1897, the Zulu king Dinuzulu KaCetshwayo, who was in exile at Saint Helena, was allowed to return to South Africa by the British. After his return, rumours circulated among Africans that he was planning a rebellion to restore African rule and expel white settlers from the region. The imposition of the poll tax served as the catalyst to unite young African men. While some chiefs and elders attempted to negate the coming rebellion, many supported it. In 1906, the first phase of the rebellion began with demonstrations at poll tax stations, resulting in the deaths of two police constables on 8 February and the subsequent imposition of martial law by the Natal colonial authorities.

Bambatha, a Zulu chief, had occasionally been in trouble with the Natal colonial administration, who suspected that he had joined with other chiefs in expressing discontent over the new poll tax. He was summoned to Greytown, but, fearing arrest, did not attend. Bambatha realised that the colonial administration was intent on crushing dissent and fled to Dinizulu's palace to consult with him. Bambatha returned to the Mpanza Valley to discover that the Natal government had deposed him as chief. He gathered together a small force of supporters and from 3 April began launching a series of guerrilla attacks on colonial forces, using the Nkandla forest as a base.

In response to news of the rebellion, the Natal authorities mustered all the soldiers and policemen they could along with requesting assistance from the Transvaal and Cape colonies. Their efforts resulted in the raising of a force of 4,316 men under Colonel Duncan McKenzie. On 10 June, McKenzie's troops surrounded Bambatha's rebels at Mome Gorge. As the sun rose, they attacked the poorly-armed rebels and inflicted heavy casualties on them. It was reported that Bambatha was killed in action by McKenzie's forces, but this claim was disputed by his supporters, who believed that he fled to Portuguese Mozambique. The rebellion was continued by Chief Meseni in the lower Thukela Valley from 13 June to 11 July, before it was also suppressed.

Over the rest of 1906, the rebellion's most bloodiest phase saw colonial forces engage in indiscriminate counterinsurgency operations to stamp out any perceived resistance. Between 3,000 and 4,000 Zulus were killed, while more than 7,000 were imprisoned and 4,000 flogged; 36 colonial soldiers died. The rebellion's suppression cost the Natal colonial government £883,576 (equivalent to £93,000,000 in 2025). The rebellion led to an uptick in support among white colonists in Southern Africa for uniting the various colonies in the region in order to maintain white supremacy. The Union of South Africa was subsequently formed in 1910.

=== Mahatma Gandhi's role ===
Amount actually collected from the poll tax between 1906 and 1909
1906	1907	1908	1909
Natal
£68,500	£49,637	£45,150	£41,498
Zululand
£7,990	£4,267	£3,940	£3,520
Total
£76,490	£53,904	£49,090	£45,018

The Indian lawyer and future independence activist Mohandas Karamchand Gandhi, who was then working as a lawyer in South Africa, encouraged Indian South Africans to participate in the rebellion's suppression. Gandhi actively encouraged colonial authorities in South Africa to recruit Indians, and argued that Indians should support the war effort in order to legitimise their claims to full citizenship. Though colonial officials refused to allow Indians to enlist as combatants, they accepted Gandhi's offer to let a detachment of Indian volunteers to serve as a stretcher bearer corps to treat wounded white soldiers.

This corps of 21 men was commanded by Gandhi, who also urged the Indian population in South Africa to join in suppressing the rebellion through his columns in Indian Opinion: "If the Government only realised what reserve force is being wasted, they would make use of it and give Indians the opportunity of a thorough training for actual warfare". By 1927, his view on the rebellion had changed, and Gandhi wrote in The Story of My Experiments with Truth that it was "No war but a man hunt".

== Commemoration ==
In 2006, the hundredth anniversary of the rebellion was commemorated in a ceremony which declared Chief Bambatha a national hero of post-Apartheid South Africa. Also, his picture appeared on a postage stamp and a street was renamed in his honour.

According to speeches in the ceremony, the beheaded body had not really been Bambatha's and the actual chief succeeded in escaping to Mozambique. This belief is still widely current; a DNA test of his alleged body failed to give a definite answer.

The hip-hop musician Afrika Bambaataa takes his name from Bambatha and his rebellion.

== See also ==
- First Boer War (1880–1881)
- Natal Native Rebellion Medal (1907)
