= 1893–94 Notts County F.C. season =

Notts County
1893–94 season
- Second Division: 3rd
- FA Cup: Winners
- Top goalscorer: League: Jimmy Logan (21); All: Jimmy Logan (27)
- Highest home attendance: c. 12,000 vs Nottingham Forest (3 March 1894)
- Lowest home attendance: c. 300 vs Crewe Alexandra (17 February 1894)
Home colours

The 1893–94 season was Notts County's sixth season in the Football League, and their first in the Second Division following relegation the previous season. The club was in a poor financial state, and there were suggestions it might decline to play in the Second Division, but it ultimately decided to do so. The team won 18, lost 7 and drew 3 of its 28 games, finishing third with 39 points. This qualified it for an end-of-season "test match" against Preston North End to decide which team would participate in the First Division the following season. This match was won 4–0 by Preston, meaning Notts County remained in the Second Division.

In the FA Cup, Notts County beat three First Division teams in the first four rounds to reach the final for the second time in the club's history. The team faced a fourth First Division club, Bolton Wanderers, in the final, played at Everton's Goodison Park. Notts County won the match 4–1, becoming the first Second Division club to win the FA Cup, with Jimmy Logan scoring a hat-trick, the second of three men to score three goals in an FA Cup final. Notts County also participated in the United Counties League, a competition to provide clubs with more competitive fixtures, and played friendlies throughout the season.

Logan was Notts County's top goalscorer; he scored 21 goals in the league and six in the FA Cup. George Toone played the most games, appearing in 40 of Notts County's 42 competitive matches. The highest attendance recorded at the club's main home ground of Trent Bridge was approximately 12,000 for the FA Cup third round replay, a Nottingham derby against Nottingham Forest.

== Background and pre-season ==
In the 1890–91 season, Notts County had finished third in the Football League, and reached the FA Cup final. The salaries of the players were raised in the wake of this success; one writer in the Nottingham Evening News later suggested that only Everton and Sunderland had spent more on wages than Notts. Meanwhile, in 1892, the Football League expanded with the creation of its Second Division, with clubs in the latter having the chance to be promoted to the First Division in end-of-season "test matches". These were matches between the lowest-ranking First Division and highest-ranking Second Division teams, with the winners qualifying for the following season's First Division, and the losing sides playing in the Second Division. In the 1892–93 season, Notts County finished 14th in the 16-team First Division, requiring the team to play such a test match. This was played against Darwen at Ardwick's Hyde Road ground, and resulted in a 3–2 win for Darwen. In consequence, Notts County lost their place in the First Division.

Crowds had fallen and this, combined with the high player salaries, left Notts County in a poor financial state. In the immediate aftermath of relegation, there was speculation about the club's future. The Nottingham Evening News described Notts County's situation as "the very reverse of encouraging. It may even be that the existence of the club is at stake." The Derby Mercury suggested that Notts County might favour local football ahead of the Second Division:

If it is decided that Notts are to be out in the cold [excluded from the First Division] it is pretty certain that they will run a purely local team next season, for they will be totally unable to pay the present high weekly wage bill with the class of matches they will be likely to obtain under those circumstances.

Before relegation was confirmed, the members of the Football League considered proposals to reorganise the competition; Blackburn Rovers suggested the separating clubs into Lancashire, Midlands and Northern sections, Sheffield United proposed expanding the First Division to 20 clubs, while Newton Heath proposed increasing the First Division to 18 clubs. The latter two proposals were voted upon at the Football League's annual meeting; both were rejected. At the same meeting, Notts declined to join the Second Division, with officials saying that the club's committee first needed to approve the team's participation. Finally, at the club's annual meeting, it was agreed that the team would indeed enter the Second Division.

At the same meeting, club officials confirmed they had secured the signings of eleven players for the new season, of whom George Toone, Alf Shelton, David Calderhead and Harry Walkerdine were named. (Note: Walkerdine did not ultimately make an appearance during the season.) These players (with the exception of Walkerdine) featured in a practice match played at the Castle Ground on 15 August, alongside Charlie Bramley, Sam Donnelly, Jack Hendry, George Kerr and Arthur Watson. Dan Bruce, Harry Dixon and Archie Osborne had also signed for Notts by this point, though they were unavailable to play in the practice match. The former player Harry Daft also rejoined during pre-season from Nottingham Forest; Daft had demanded a transfer the previous season after being dropped for failing to report for a tour of Scotland (Daft claimed to be injured, the club's doctor believed him fit). The dispute between Daft and the club was however settled, and he returned to Notts.

== Second Division ==
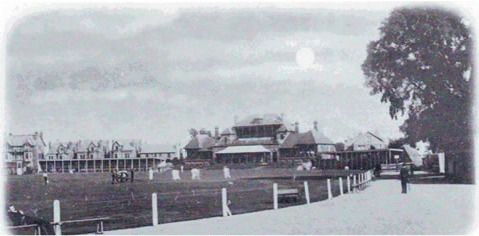
Trent Bridge as it appeared c. 1890

The team opened their Second Division campaign on 2 September with a 2–0 win at Crewe Alexandra. Notts County's first home match was played a week later at the Castle Ground, (Note: Notts County's usual home venue of Trent Bridge was shared with Nottinghamshire County Cricket Club. Cricket took priority on the ground, and the football team often played early and late season games at other venues.) and resulted in a 3–2 win over Woolwich Arsenal. Bruce scored two, and the home side overcame a 1–2 deficit to win the game. Two away wins followed, at Northwich Victoria and Rotherham Town, before Notts played their first league match at their main home venue of Trent Bridge, a 1–1 draw with Liverpool. Notts secured the signing of two forwards, Jimmy McLachlan and Jimmy Logan in late September; Logan scored twice on his league debut in a 3–0 home win over Grimsby Town in Notts County's next game, and he scored again nine days later when Notts defeated Newcastle United 3–1. After seven games, Notts County were in second place with 13 points.

The team were beaten in the league for the first time in their next game, a 5–2 loss away at Grimsby. The club then hosted Burslem Port Vale on 26 October, the latter entering the match top of the table. Logan scored a hat-trick, and Notts won 6–1 to move into first place. A 0–0 draw at Ardwick followed, before Notts hosted Middlesbrough Ironopolis in their next match. It began with "a series of races from one end of the field to the other", before the home side went ahead, and Notts ultimately won 3–0. A 2–1 home defeat to Lincoln City in their next match left the team in second place behind their next opponents Liverpool, who would also defeat Notts 2–1 on a cold and windy day at Anfield. Logan scored another hat-trick and Bruce two in Notts County's next game, a 6–1 win over Northwich, who were "altogether outclassed". After 14 games, the team were in second place, with 20 points.

After a 1–0 defeat at Burslem Port Vale, Notts would again score six, this time in a 6–2 win over Burton Swifts in which George Kerr scored a hat-trick. The next match, played at Newcastle on 9 December, began quietly, with "scarcely any play to rouse the spectators". After withstanding several shots from Notts, Newcastle took the lead, and they would ultimately prevail 3–0. Notts returned to the north east of England the following week, and the resulting 0–0 draw with Ironopolis left the team in fourth place. Logan scored both goals in Notts County's final league match of 1893, a 2–0 win away at Burton Swifts, and Notts ended the year back in third position. Bruce scored a first-half hat-trick, and Notts led 3–0 at half time in their first match of 1894, a home game with Rotherham. The away side rallied in the second half, reducing the deficit to 3–2, but a goal from Kerr made the final score 4–2 to Notts. Notts then defeated Walsall Town Swifts 2–0 at home in driving wind and rain, leaving the team in third place with 29 points from 21 matches.

In their first match of February, Notts played second place Small Health at Trent Bridge, and they were able to reduce the gap on their opponent to one point with a 3–1 win. The team's next league match was also at Trent Bridge, a 9–1 win over Crewe played "with sleet and rain falling almost perpendicularly down" and the players "ploughing through inches deep of slush". The conditions meant "even the most ardent enthusiasts shirked the game", and the reported gate of c. 300 is the lowest in Notts County's history. The team lost its next match 2–1 at Walsall, but then defeated Ardwick 5–0 at the Castle Ground in its final home game of the season, with all five goals being scored in the first half. Notts ended the season with three away games, beginning with a 2–0 win at Lincoln. The following day, the team travelled to Plumstead to take on Arsenal, where they overcame a 0–1 deficit to win 2–1. Notts County's final league match of the season, their first after winning the FA Cup, was a 3–0 defeat at Small Heath. The team would end the season in third place, with 39 points from 28 matches.

=== League match details ===
Key

- In result column, Notts County's score shown first
- H = Home match
- A = Away match
- pen. = Penalty kick
- o.g. = Own goal

Results
Date	Opponents	Result	Notts County goalscorers	Attendance
2 September 1893	Crewe Alexanda (A)	2–0	Bruce, Watson	2,000
9 September 1893	Woolwich Arsenal (H)	3–2	Bruce (2), Watson	6,000
11 September 1893	Northwich Victoria (A)	1–0	Bruce	1,000
16 September 1893	Rotherham Town (A)	2–0	Bramley, Daft	1,000
30 September 1893	Liverpool (H)	1–1	Watson	6,000
5 October 1893	Grimsby Town (H)	3–0	Logan (2), Bruce	4,000
14 October 1893	Newcastle United (H)	3–1	Daft, Logan, Watson	3,000
21 October 1893	Grimsby Town (A)	2–5	Logan, Higgins (o.g.)	3,000
26 October 1893	Burslem Port Vale (H)	6–1	Logan (3), Daft, Kerr, Watson	3,000
28 October 1893	Ardwick (A)	0–0		4,000
4 November 1893	Middlesbrough Ironopolis (H)	3–0	Watson, Logan, Daft	5,000
16 November 1893	Lincoln City (H)	1–2	Bruce	2,000
18 November 1893	Liverpool (A)	1–2	Bruce	8,000
23 November 1893	Northwich Victoria (H)	6–1	Logan (3), Bruce (2), Watson	1,000
25 November 1893	Burslem Port Vale (A)	0–1		1,000
30 November 1893	Burton Swifts (H)	6–2	Kerr (3), Logan, Daft, Watson	2,000
9 December 1893	Newcastle United (A)	0–3		3,000
16 December 1893	Middlesbrough Ironopolis (A)	0–0		2,000
30 December 1893	Burton Swifts (A)	2–0	Logan (2)	not recorded
11 January 1894	Rotherham Town (H)	4–2	Bruce (3), Kerr	1,500
20 January 1894	Walsall Town Swifts (H)	2–0	Bruce, Shelton	2,000
3 February 1894	Small Heath (H)	3–1	Logan, Watson, Jenkyns (o.g.)	6,000
17 February 1894	Crewe Alexandra (H)	9–1	Watson (4), Bruce (2), Logan (2), Daft	300
12 March 1894	Walsall Town Swifts (A)	1–2	Logan	2,000
15 March 1894	Ardwick (H)	5–0	Logan (2), Allsopp, Bruce, Kerr	2,500
23 March 1894	Lincoln City (A)	2–0	Bruce, Daft	6,000
24 March 1894	Woolwich Arsenal (A)	2–1	Bruce, Logan	13,000
7 April 1894	Small Heath (A)	0–3		8,500

=== Partial league table ===
Football League Second Division final table, leading positions
Pos	Team	Pld	W	D	L	GF	GA	GAv	Pts	
1	Liverpool	28	22	6	0	77	18	4.278	50	Qualified for "test matches" for possible promotion
2	Small Heath	28	21	0	7	103	44	2.341	42	Qualified for "test matches" for possible promotion
3	Notts County	28	18	3	7	70	31	2.258	39	Qualified for "test matches" for possible promotion
4	Newcastle United	28	15	6	7	66	39	1.692	36	

=== Test match ===
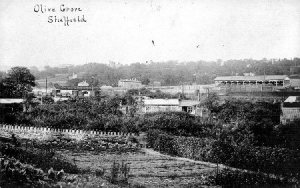
Olive Grove, Sheffield, was the venue of the test match

Having finished third in the Second Division, Notts County entered a "test match" to decide whether the team would play in the First or Second Division the following season. The team's opponent was Preston North End, who had finished 14th in the First Division. The game was played at Olive Grove, Sheffield, on 28 April, with about 8,000 spectators present. The Nottingham Evening Post opined that, while the FA Cup final had been played only with "honour" at stake, "many pounds, shillings, and pence" depended on the outcome of this game. Preston took on the lead on 25 minutes, and scored a second four minutes later. They then hit the crossbar, before adding a third five minutes before half time. The First Division side struck the crossbar again early in the second half, and made it 4–0 in the 52nd minute. This was the final score, and the loss meant that Notts would remain in the Second Division.

==== Test match details ====
Key

- In result column, Notts County's score shown first
- N = Match played at neutral venue

Results
Date	Opponents	Result	Notts County goalscorers	Attendance
28 April 1894	Preston North End (N)	0–4		8,000

== FA Cup ==
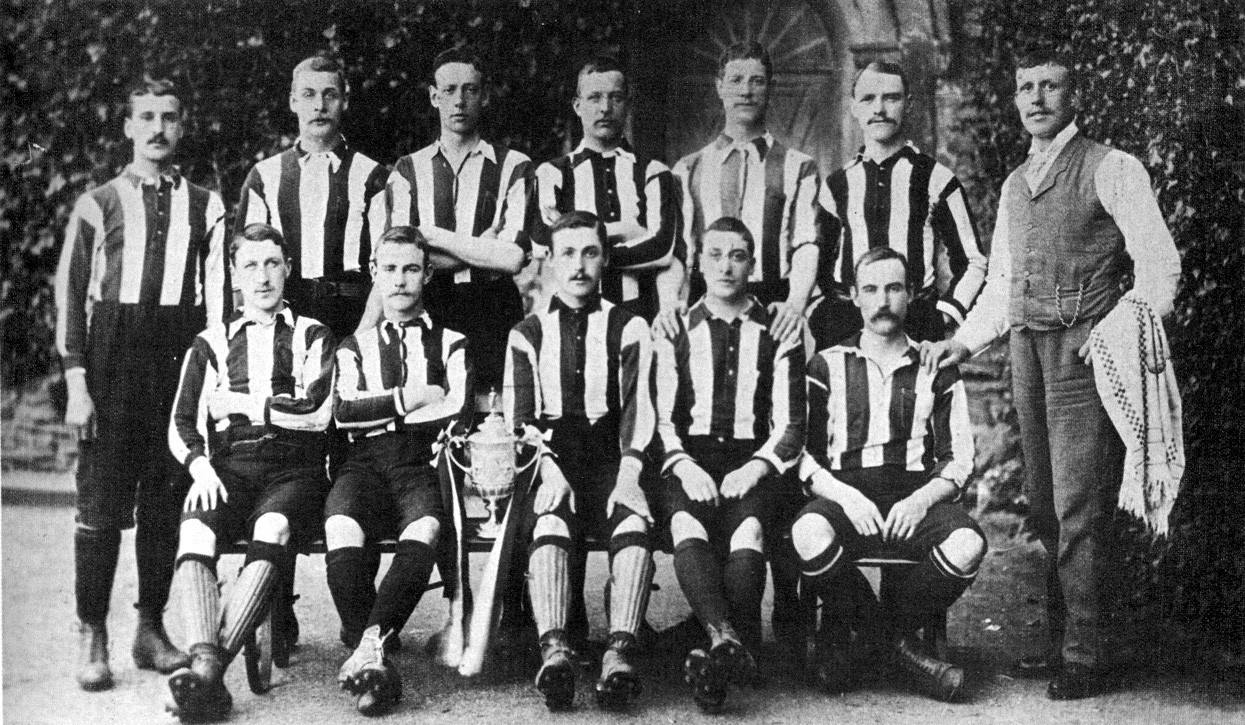
In 1894, Notts County won the FA Cup for the only time in their history.

Notts County were drawn at home to First Division Burnley in the first round of the FA Cup. The match was played in windy conditions, and won 1–0 by Notts through a Logan goal described by the Nottingham Evening Post as "one of the best goals scored at Trent Bridge this season." In the second round, Notts travelled to Burton Wanderers of the Midland League. In preparation for the match, the club arranged for the players to have "good hard training" at Hazleford, and the team travelled to Burton-on-Trent by train on the day of the game, together with a sizeable number of Notts supporters. Notts led 2–0 at half time through a goal by Donnelly and a penalty from Logan. Wanderers would pull a goal back in the second half and hit the post twice, but the away team held on to win 2–1.

In the third round, Notts were drawn to play First Division Nottingham Forest at the latter's Town Ground. The match drew a record crowd for the Town Ground; the Nottingham Evening Post reported that spectators climbed trees to gain a good view and that "there would have been quite 20,000 people present when the match commenced." (Note: Notts County F.C: The Official History, 1862–1995 gives the attendance as 15,000.) Tom McInnes gave Forest a 1–0 first-half lead, but Notts quickly equalised through Bruce. The score remained 1–1 at full time and, with extra time being unable to separate the sides, a replay was required. The two clubs obtained permission to postpone their respective league matches scheduled for 3 March, allowing the replay to be played at Trent Bridge that afternoon. Logan gave Notts the lead in the opening minutes, and the home team found themselves 3–0 up after 31 minutes following further goals from Donnelly and Bruce. Donnelly added a fourth goal during the second half, before McInnes scored a consolation goal for Forest to make the final score 4–1 to Notts.

Notts County advanced to the semi-final, where they faced First Division Blackburn Rovers at Bramall Lane, Sheffield. Special trains were laid on to bring spectators from Nottingham, and the total crowd was estimated to be about 20,000. The match was described by the Football News as one of "keen attack and sturdy defence". Blackburn's goalkeeper Adam Ogilvie saved a shot from Logan in about the tenth minute, but Daft scored to give Notts a 1–0 lead shortly afterwards. During the second half, the Notts goal came under "great jeopardy" as Blackburn sought an equaliser. Harry Chippendale headed the ball against the crossbar, and Michael Calvey had a quick succession of chances to score. Rovers had eleven corners during the second half, but Notts held firm to win the match 1–0 and progress to their second FA Cup final. "Special telephonic arrangements" allowed the Nottingham Evening Post to publish the result in Nottingham within two or three minutes of the final whistle. There was a "scene of great enthusiasm" among club members who had assembled at Notts County's headquarters to await the result.

Notts County faced Bolton Wanderers, another First Division team, in the final. Goodison Park, Liverpool, was selected as the venue over the objection of Notts; they would have further to travel than their opponents, and the press thought it likely that the crowd would be more favourable towards Bolton. To prepare for the match, the team spent the week training at West Kirby. Notts had the better of the early play, with Bruce striking the crossbar and Donnelly hitting the post before Watson gave the Second Division side a 1–0 lead. Soon afterwards, at around the 30-minute mark, Logan scored Notts County's second, and they led 2–0 at half time. Bolton's Handel Bentley hit the post early in the second half, but Notts were soon "completely out-playing their opponents", and Logan would score two more to complete his hat-trick and put his team 4–0 up. Bolton scored a late goal to make it 4–1, but the final whistle went soon afterwards, and Notts County became the first Second Division team to win the FA Cup. The team returned to Nottingham that night, arriving at Nottingham Midland station to huge awaiting crowds, who accompanied them to the club's headquarters at the Lion Hotel on Clumber Street.

=== FA Cup match details ===
Key

- In result column, Notts County's score shown first
- H = Home match
- A = Away match
- N = Match played at neutral venue
- pen. = Penalty kick

Results
Date	Round	Opponents	Result	Notts County goalscorers	Attendance
27 January 1894	First round	Burnley (H)	1–0	Logan	8,000
10 February 1894	Second round	Burton Wanderers (A)	2–1	Donnelly, Logan (pen.)	6,000
24 February 1894	Third round	Nottingham Forest (A)	1–1	Bruce	15,000
3 March 1894	Replay	Nottingham Forest (H)	4–1	Bruce (2), Donnelly, Logan	12,000
10 March 1894	Semi-final	Blackburn Rovers (N)	1–0	Daft	20,000
31 March 1894	Final	Bolton Wanderers (N)	4–1	Watson, Logan (3)	37,000

== United Counties League ==
Notts County also participated in the United Counties League during this season; this was a competition for clubs in the East Midlands and Sheffield areas, and was primarily aimed at providing teams with competitive matches in weeks that might otherwise be filled only with friendlies. Notts County's first match in the competition against Sheffield United on 2 December had already been scheduled as a friendly before the League's formation; the 0–0 draw between the teams at Trent Bridge was therefore one of the new league's first games. Notts played two matches in the competition during January, a 1–0 defeat at Forest and an 8–1 defeat at Derby County, after which there were no more games until March, when Notts gained their first win, a 2–1 victory over The Wednesday. When Notts played Derby on 26 March at the Castle Ground, five days before the FA Cup final, not one of the players who had represented the club in the previous ten games participated, and Derby won 4–0. Notts were again beaten 4–0 in their next match, played at The Wednesday on 9 April, before finishing the competition with a 4–3 home defeat to Forest. A return match with Sheffield United was never played.

=== United Counties League match details ===
Key

- In result column, Notts County's score shown first
- H = Home match
- A = Away match
- pen. = Penalty kick
- o.g. = Own goal

Results
Date	Opponents	Result	Notts County goalscorers	Attendance
2 December 1893	Sheffield United (H)	0–0		good
6 January 1894	Nottingham Forest (A)	0–1		4,000
13 January 1894	Derby County (A)	1–8	Kerr	not reported
17 March 1894	The Wednesday (H)	2–1	Daft, Shepperson	3,000
26 March 1894	Derby County (H)	0–4		4,000
9 April 1894	The Wednesday (A)	0–4		1,000
19 April 1894	Nottingham Forest (H)	3–4	Bruce, Daft (2)	3,000

=== League table ===
United Counties League (Northern Division) final table
Pos	Team	Pld	W	D	L	GF	GA	GAv	Pts	
1	Derby County	8	5	2	1	22	7	3.143	12	Qualified for championship match against Southern Division winner
2	Nottingham Forest	8	4	3	1	15	10	1.500	11	
3	The Wednesday	8	2	3	3	15	15	1.000	7	
4	Sheffield United	7	1	3	3	4	8	0.500	5	
5	Notts County	7	1	1	5	6	22	0.273	3	

== Other matches ==
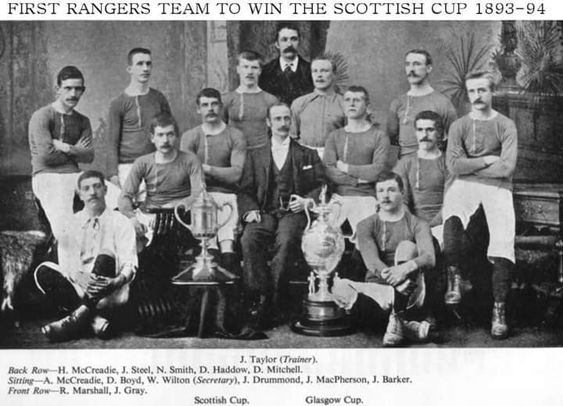
Notts County's other matches included one with Rangers, the winners of the Scottish Cup.

As was normal at the time, Notts also played other matches, primarily friendlies, throughout the season, the first a 9–1 win over Bulwell United at the Castle Ground on 4 September. The team next won 3–2 at Greenhalgh's, before hosting Chester at the Castle Ground on 23 September. The Chester team, including five Wales internationals, was beaten 5–1. Two days later, Notts overcame a 1–0 deficit to win 2–1 at Leicester Fosse, but then lost 2–1 to Burton Wanderers at Trent Bridge on 28 September. The team next travelled to West Bromwich Albion, where Notts were beaten 2–0 by their First Division opponents. On 9 October, two days after a 7–0 win at Chatham, Notts faced another First Division opponent, this time winning 2–1 at The Wednesday having been 1–0 down at half time.

Friendlies resumed on 10 November, when Notts played at Loughborough, and the team, which was not Notts County's first eleven, was beaten 4–1. The following day, Notts travelled to the Town Ground to play Forest in the season's first Nottingham derby. About 15,000 spectators were present, and Notts beat their First Division rivals 2–1, the decisive goal coming from Daft about seven minutes from the end. Three more friendlies against First Division sides followed, with a 4–1 defeat at Wolverhampton Wanderers, a 2–0 home defeat to Aston Villa and a 0–0 draw with Everton. Notts next played Corinthians, an amateur club, at Trent Bridge on 23 December, winning 4–1, before hosting a return match with Forest on 26 December. The two sides drew 1–1, with Forest quickly equalising after Logan had put Notts 1–0 ahead. The team won 5–1 at Kettering Town in its first match of 1894, before playing West Bromwich Albion on 4 January, Notts defeating the First Division side 3–1 in snowy conditions at Trent Bridge.

Notts played Wolves at the Castle Ground in the first round of the Bass Charity Vase on 5 April in their first match after winning the FA Cup, and the team, nine of whom had played in the final, was greeted by spectators with "upmost enthusiasm" before its 2–0 win. Only two members of the cup final team travelled to Burton-on-Trent for the next round, where the team was eliminated from the competition by Stoke in a 2–0 loss. Notts won 6–1 at Crouch End, before returning to Burton-on-Trent where they were beaten 2–1 by Burton Wanderers. The team next won 2–1 at Newark, before it returned to Goodison Park to take on Everton, losing 3–0 on a wet night before 1,000 spectators. Notts County's final match of the season was at Ibrox Park against Rangers. Rangers had won the 1893–94 Scottish Cup, and the Scottish Referee described the meeting of the two cup winners as a "championship match". Rangers won 3–1, with Logan scoring for Notts.

=== Match details ===
Key

- In result column, Notts County's score shown first
- H = Home match
- A = Away match
- N = Match played at a neutral venue

Results

Date	Opponents	Result
4 September 1893	Bulwell United (H)	9–0
18 September 1893	Greenhalgh's (A)	3–2
23 September 1893	Chester (H)	5–1
25 September 1893	Leicester Fosse (A)	2–1
28 September 1893	Burton Wanderers (H)	1–2
2 October 1893	West Bromwich Albion (A)	0–2
7 October 1893	Chatham (A)	7–0
9 October 1893	The Wednesday (A)	2–1
10 November 1893	Loughborough (A)	1–4
11 November 1893	Nottingham Forest (A)	2–1
13 November 1893	Wolverhampton Wanderers (A)	1–4
7 December 1893	Aston Villa (H)	0–2
21 December 1893	Everton (H)	0–0
23 December 1893	Corinthians (H)	4–1
26 December 1893	Nottingham Forest (H)	1–1
1 January 1894	Kettering Town (A)	5–0
4 January 1894	West Bromwich Albion (H)	3–1
5 April 1894	Wolverhampton Wanderers (H)	2–0
12 April 1894	Stoke (N)	0–2
14 April 1894	Crouch End (A)	6–1
16 April 1894	Burton Wanderers (A)	1–2
21 April 1894	Newark (A)	2–1
23 April 1894	Everton (A)	0–3
30 April 1894	Rangers (A)	1–3

== Players ==
During the season, 28 players made at least one competitive appearance for Notts County. Goalkeeper George Toone made the most, playing in 40 of the club's 42 matches. Dan Bruce and Jack Hendry both played 39. Nine players made only one appearance, five of whom featured in the same match; the United Counties League home tie with Derby played five days before the FA Cup final. Logan's 27 goals made him the team's top scorer; Bruce had the second highest total, with 22.

Player statistics
Player	Position	Second Division		Test match		FA Cup		United Counties League		Total	
Player	Position	Apps	Goals	Apps	Goals	Apps	Goals	Apps	Goals	Apps	Goals
Elijah Allsopp	RW	1	1	0	0	0	0	0	0	1	1
Askew	FB	0	0	0	0	0	0	1	0	1	0
Charlie Bramley	HB	18	1	1	0	6	0	6	0	31	1
Dan Bruce	FW	26	18	1	0	6	3	6	1	39	22
Jimmy Burke	LW	0	0	0	0	0	0	1	0	1	0
William Burrows	GK	1	0	0	0	0	0	1	0	2	0
David Calderhead	HB	26	0	1	0	6	0	3	0	36	0
Harry Daft	LW	24	7	1	0	6	1	5	3	36	11
Dean	FW	0	0	0	0	0	0	1	0	1	0
Harry Dixon	LW	3	0	0	0	0	0	0	0	3	0
Sam Donnelly	FW	15	0	1	0	5	2	6	0	27	2
I. Gadsby	RW	0	0	0	0	0	0	1	0	1	0
Fay Harper	FB	24	0	1	0	6	0	5	0	36	0
Jack Hendry	FB	27	0	0	0	6	0	6	0	39	0
Arthur Henfrey	FW	0	0	0	0	1	0	0	0	1	0
George Kerr	FW	23	6	0	0	1	0	5	1	29	7
Louis King	RW	1	0	0	0	0	0	1	0	2	0
Jimmy Logan	FW	21	21	1	0	6	6	6	0	34	27
John Mabbott	FW	1	0	0	0	0	0	0	0	1	0
Jimmy McLachlan	FW	2	0	0	0	0	0	0	0	2	0
W.L. Murray	FB	0	0	0	0	0	0	1	0	1	0
Archie Osborne	HB	19	0	0	0	0	0	5	0	24	0
Alf Shelton	HB	25	1	1	0	6	0	4	0	36	0
Henry Sissons	FW	0	0	0	0	0	0	1	0	1	0
George Shepperson	FW	1	0	0	0	0	0	2	1	3	1
George Toone	GK	27	0	1	0	6	0	6	0	40	0
Arthur Watson	RW	20	13	1	0	5	1	1	0	27	14
Frank Wilkinson	HB	3	0	1	0	0	0	4	0	7	0

FW = Forward, HB = Half-back, GK = Goalkeeper, FB = Full-back, LW = Left winger, RW = Right winger

== Aftermath ==
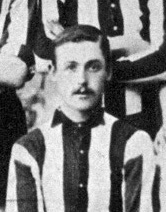
Jimmy Logan

At the League's annual meeting in May 1894, the topic of expansion of the First Division was once again discussed. Blackburn proposed increasing the number of competing teams from 16 to 18, with one argument in favour being that the FA Cup winner would otherwise be excluded. The proposal was however defeated. Winning the FA Cup helped alleviate Notts County's financial problems; at the club's annual general meeting in June 1894, directors reported a profit of £218. 17s. 6d. for the season. The directors congratulated the team on bringing the FA Cup to Nottingham for the first time, but lamented that Notts would have to continue in the Second Division. They announced that they would "leave no stone unturned to again get in the First Division" and that all the members of the 1893–94 team had either already re-signed or shortly would. The team were again defeated in a test match at the end of the 1894–95 season, and Notts were ultimately not promoted back to the First Division until 1896–97.

By 1896, Jimmy Logan was playing for Loughborough. Logan was part of a team that mislaid its kit while travelling to a game against Newton Heath. Unable to borrow a kit, the team elected to play in the same clothes they had travelled in. It rained during the match and the team were forced to return home without a fresh change of clothes. Shortly afterwards, Logan fell ill and developed pneumonia and he soon died aged 25. He was buried in a pauper's grave in Loughborough that for many years remained unmarked. In 2016, after his resting place had been located, a headstone was erected following a fundraising campaign by Notts County supporters. Logan remains one of three men to score a hat-trick in an FA Cup final, the others being William Townley of Blackburn Rovers in 1890 and Stan Mortensen of Blackpool in 1953.
