= 1894 FA Cup final =

1894 FA Cup Final
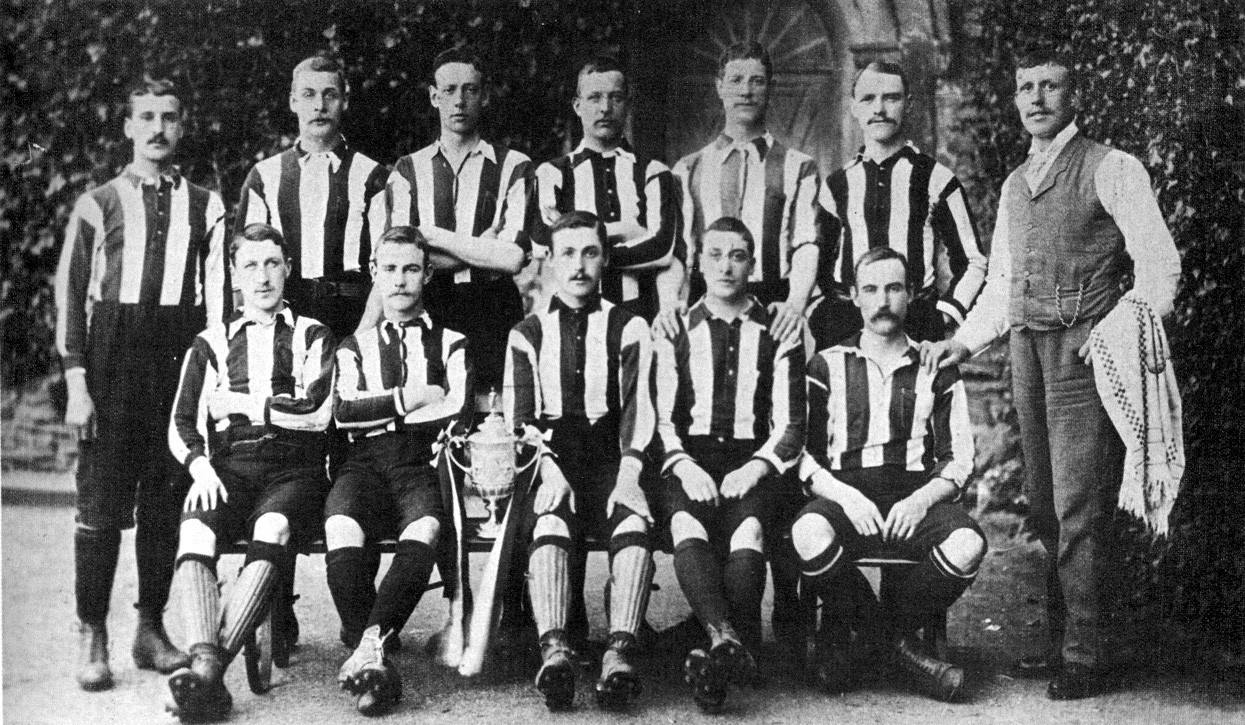
- Notts County, the winning team, pictured with the trophy
- Event: 1893–94 FA Cup
| Notts County | Bolton Wanderers |
| 4 | 1 |
- Date: 31 March 1894
- Venue: Goodison Park, Liverpool
- Referee: C. J. Hughes
- Attendance: 37,000 (official)

The 1894 FA Cup final was an association football match between Notts County and Bolton Wanderers at Goodison Park, Liverpool, on 31 March 1894. It was the final match of the 1893–94 edition of the FA Cup, English football's primary cup competition. Bolton Wanderers were appearing in their first final, whereas Notts County were playing in their second, having lost on their previous appearance in 1891. Both clubs were therefore seeking to win the FA Cup for the first time. The two teams had each needed to win four ties to reach the final, with Bolton Wanderers winning all of theirs at the first attempt, and Notts County requiring a replay to progress from the third round.

Jimmy Turner of Bolton Wanderers was forced by injury to withdraw from his team on the day of the match, whereas Notts County had no injury concerns. Watched by 37,000 spectators, and refereed by Charles Hughes of Cheshire, Notts County led 2–0 at half time through goals from Arthur Watson and Jimmy Logan. In the second half, Logan would score two more, and Notts County won the match 4–1. Logan's feat of scoring three goals made him the second of three men to score a hat-trick in an FA Cup final, and the match was dubbed "Logan's final" by members of the press.

At the time of the match, Notts County were members of the Football League Second Division. By winning the final, they became the first club to win the FA Cup while playing below the highest level the English football league system, a feat accomplished only eight times. It remains Notts County's only FA Cup triumph, and they have never returned to the final. Logan died two years after the match, his pauper's grave left unmarked until 2016, when Notts County supporters located it and raised funds to erect a headstone.

== Route to the final ==
=== Bolton Wanderers ===
| Round | Opposition | Score |
|---|---|---|
| 1st | Small Heath (a) | 4–3 |
| 2nd | Newcastle United (a) | 2–1 |
| 3rd | Liverpool (h) | 3–0 |
| Semi-final | The Wednesday (n) | 2–1 |
Key: (h) = Home venue; (a) = Away venue; (n) = Neutral venue

Bolton Wanderers, a First Division club, began their 1893–94 FA Cup campaign with a first round tie away at Small Heath of the Second Division. Small Heath led 2–0 at half time, but Bolton had equalised within six minutes of the start of the second half. Small Heath then took a 3–2 lead, but Bolton ultimately prevailed 4–3, equalising through an own goal before Jim Wilson scored the winner. Bolton were drawn against another Second Division club, Newcastle United, in the second round, and were required to travel to Newcastle upon Tyne despite lodging a protest that the ground was unfit to host an FA Cup tie. Di Jones and Jimmy Turner of Bolton each scored within two minutes of each other, and the away team led 2–0 at half time. Newcastle would have two goals disallowed for offside during the second half, but a third was allowed with about 10 minutes remaining. There was no further scoring, and Bolton won 2–1.

Bolton were drawn at home against Liverpool of the Second Division in the third round. As the only tie of the round to be played in Lancashire, the match attracted significant interest, with a reported crowd of c. 20,000. Bolton scored within the first five minutes, gained a second after about half an hour, and led 2–0 at half time. They scored a third 25 minutes into the second half, and progressed to the semi-final with a 3–0 win. Here, Bolton were drawn to play fellow First Division side The Wednesday, with the tie being played at the neutral ground of Fallowfield Stadium, Manchester. Handel Bentley of Bolton gave his side a 1–0 lead from a free kick three minutes before half-time. In the second half, Wednesday had a goal disallowed when Alec Brady was ruled offside, and shortly afterwards Wednesday goalkeeper Bill Allan put the ball into his own goal to give Bolton a 2–0 lead. Harry Woolhouse scored a late goal for Wednesday, but Bolton held on to win 2–1.

=== Notts County ===
| Round | Opposition | Score |
|---|---|---|
| 1st | Burnley (h) | 1–0 |
| 2nd | Burton Wanderers (a) | 2–1 |
| 3rd | Nottingham Forest (a) | 1–1 |
| 3rd | Nottingham Forest (h) | 4–1 |
| Semi-final | Blackburn Rovers (n) | 1–0 |
Key: (h) = Home venue; (a) = Away venue; (n) = Neutral venue

Notts County, a Second Division club, also entered the FA Cup in the first round, where they were drawn to play a home tie against the First Division side Burnley. Jimmy Logan put Notts ahead after seven minutes, and this proved to be the only goal, the home side winning 1–0 in a match that also saw the Notts captain David Calderhead and Jock Espie of Burnley dismissed from the field. In the second round, Notts were drawn to play an away match against Burton Wanderers of the Midland Football League. Notts led 2–0 at half time through a goal from Sam Donnelly and a penalty from Logan. Burton Wanderers pulled a goal back in the second half, but struck the post twice and were unable to find an equaliser, Notts County winning the tie 2–1.

In the third round, Notts County were drawn to play a Nottingham derby at First Division neighbours Nottingham Forest. Tom McInnes gave Forest a 1–0 lead in the first half, but Notts quickly equalised through Dan Bruce. There was no further scoring despite extra time being played, making a replay necessary. Notts County were ahead through Logan within three minutes of the start of the replay, and they led 3–0 at half time following further goals from Donnelly and Bruce. Donnelly gained his second goal of the game during the second half to put his side 4–0 up, before McInnes scored for Forest, and Notts won the replay 4–1. Notts County faced Blackburn Rovers in the semi-final, played at the neutral ground of Bramall Lane, Sheffield. Harry Daft gave Notts a 1–0 lead, after which their goal came under significant pressure as their First Division opponents sought an equaliser. During the second half, Harry Chippendale headed a chance against the crossbar for Blackburn, and his team forced eleven corners altogether, but Notts held firm to win the match 1–0 and progress to their second FA Cup final.

== Pre-match ==
Illustration of Goodison Park as it appeared in 1892

The final was played at Goodison Park, Liverpool, the home ground of Everton. The venue was selected by a meeting of the Football Association Council on 15 March, with Bramall Lane, Sheffield; Wellington Road, Birmingham, and the Molineux Ground, Wolverhampton, also considered. The choice of venue resulted in some controversy; Notts County lodged a protest against the selection, and members of the press argued that Bolton, a Lancashire club, would have an advantage by playing the final in the same county, having less far to travel and a crowd more favourable towards them. Others opined that Goodison Park was the most suitable choice: "so far as accommodation goes, there is no doubt [the Council's] decision was a wise one", a journalist for the Sheffield Evening Telegraph wrote, "the banking and stand arrangements are simply superb."

On the Monday before the final, Notts County played a United Counties League match with Derby County, and Notts County's directors opted against fielding its first team; a "curious eleven" deputised in its place. Instead, the first team spent the week training at West Kirby at the ground of West Kirby Football Club, and was well rested and without injury. By contrast, the Bolton team remained at home, except for a First Division match, coincidentally against Everton at Goodison Park, played on the Monday before the final. Alex Paton and Jimmy Turner were reported as doubts to start the final due to injury, with both men receiving specialist care in Manchester in an effort to have them available. When teams were announced the day before the final, Paton and Turner were both named in the Bolton side. Turner, however, was forced to withdraw from the team on the day of the game, Harry Gardiner replacing him.

Notts County were making their second appearance in the FA Cup final, having previously lost to Blackburn Rovers in 1891. Meanwhile, Bolton were playing in the final for the first time in their history. Bolton Wanderers and Notts County had previously met in the FA Cup in the 1883–84 season, with Notts winning 2–1 at Pike's Lane in a replay following a 2–2 draw at Trent Bridge. Bolton began the week before the final as the strong favourite to win, but opinion became more evenly divided as the week progressed. Bolton entered the match while third from bottom in the First Division, while Notts County were third in the Second Division. The progress of two unfancied teams to the final attracted some comment: "Never, perhaps, in the history of the game have two outsiders like Notts County and Bolton Wanderers reached the last stage of the competition", as The Sketch put it. "It is difficult to explain why two second-rate clubs should have come to the top in the manner they have done", they continued.

== Match ==
=== Summary ===
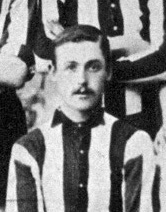
Jimmy Logan (pictured in 1894) scored a hat-trick.

The Notts County captain David Calderhead won the toss for his team, and the game kicked off shortly ahead of its advertised time of 4pm, refereed by C.J. Hughes of Cheshire. There was little advantage gained from winning the toss (and thereby having choice of end to attack first) "as hardly a breadth of wind was stirring." Jim Cassidy kicked off for Bolton Wanderers, who had the match's first attack, though Notts cleared despite a bad clearance from their full-back Fay Harper. The Bolton goalkeeper John Willie Sutcliffe had to make two clearances in quick succession, but his side then won consecutive corners, the first of which was put behind by Robert Tannahill. About 14 minutes into the game, Bentley of Bolton narrowly put the ball wide from a Jones free kick, before Notts struck the woodwork twice in quick succession. Bruce first hit the crossbar from long range and the ball rebounded back into play, where it was met by Jones of Bolton. Two minutes afterward, Logan made a pass to Sam Donnelly who struck the post. This time, however, Arthur Watson of Notts met the rebound, and guided the ball over the line to give Notts a 1–0 lead.

Soon afterwards, Jack Hendry of Notts appeared to trip an opponent within the penalty area, but appeals for a penalty kick were ignored, and Notts instead broke, with Bruce going clean through and narrowly putting his shot wide. At the other end, Joe Dickenson of Bolton sent the ball over the bar "with the goal at his mercy", before Logan had the first of a series of chances for Notts. He put the first two shots wide, the second being close enough that many spectators thought he had scored, before beating Sutcliffe with his third and scoring with a hard shot. Some in the crowd "half anticipated the point being disallowed for off-side", but the goal was awarded, and Notts led 2–0 at about the half hour point. Notts pressed continuously through the remainder of the half; Daft put a shot over, was caught off-side shortly thereafter, and then barely a minute later had another chance eventually cleared by Sutcliffe. Watson had two chances to score his second goal of the match, while Donnelly and Bruce also came close, the latter being denied by good defending from Paton. Bolton finished the half on the attack, but Calderhead cleared for Notts, and the half-time whistle went shortly thereafter with the Second Division side leading 2–0.

Logan kicked off the second half for Notts after a break of about eight minutes. Bolton had the first chance of the half, with Bentley striking the post and Hendry clearing the rebound. Another chance for Bolton followed shortly after, but the match was soon being played almost entirely in front of the Bolton goal, with a "scrimmage" of several shots ended when Charlie Bramley put the ball wide of goal. Having weathered the pressure from the Notts forwards, Bolton cleared, with Alf Shelton of Notts having to singlehandedly clear the ball after a dangerous Bolton counter-attack. Sutcliffe then made two saves, the first from Bruce, the second from Logan forcing a corner from which Sutcliffe cleared. Logan was soon on the attack again, put through by Daft, and hit the ball straight at Sutcliffe. Such was the force of the shot, Sutcliffe was unable to gather it, and the ball instead fell to his feet. Logan dashed in to beat Sutcliffe to the loose ball and fired it into the goal to score his second of the match and give his side a 3–0 lead.

Archie Hughes had Bolton's next opportunity with a free kick after Shelton had fouled Bentley. However, Hughes sent his effort well over the bar. Notts were immediately back on the attack, and Daft once again centred a pass to Logan, who completed his hat-trick and put his side 4–0 up. The Notts attack continued to make chances, with Daft shooting wide and Watson forcing a corner from which Bramley headed over. Notts forced two further corners, before Sutcliffe was forced to fist the ball clear after Daft was able to send the ball well into the goal area. In their next attack, Watson made a pass to Logan at centre, who was denied a fourth goal of the game by a fine save from Sutcliffe. In the final moments of the match, Bentley had a shot for Bolton. The Notts goalkeeper George Toone fell with the ball loose, allowing Cassidy to fire into an empty net and register Bolton's only goal. The final whistle went shortly afterwards, and Notts County won the FA Cup with a 4–1 victory. The cup was presented to the team about half an hour after the match's conclusion.

=== Details ===
31 March 1894
Shortly before 16:00

| Notts County | 4–1 | Bolton Wanderers |
|---|---|---|
| Watson 20'; Logan 31', 57', 60' | | Cassidy 89' |

Goodison Park
Attendance: 37,000
Referee: C.J. Hughes (Cheshire)

| Notts County | Bolton Wanderers |

| GK | George Toone |
| FB | Fay Harper |
| FB | Jack Hendry |
| HB | Charlie Bramley |
| HB | David Calderhead |
| HB | Alf Shelton |
| FW | Arthur Watson |
| FW | Sam Donnelly |
| FW | James Logan |
| FW | Dan Bruce |
| FW | Harry Daft |

| GK | John Sutcliffe |
| FB | John Somerville |
| FB | Di Jones |
| HB | Alex Paton |
| HB | Archie Hughes |
| HB | Harry Gardiner |
| FW | Jim Wilson |
| FW | Robert Tannahill |
| FW | Jim Cassidy |
| FW | Joe Dickenson |
| FW | Handel Bentley |

== Post-match and legacy ==
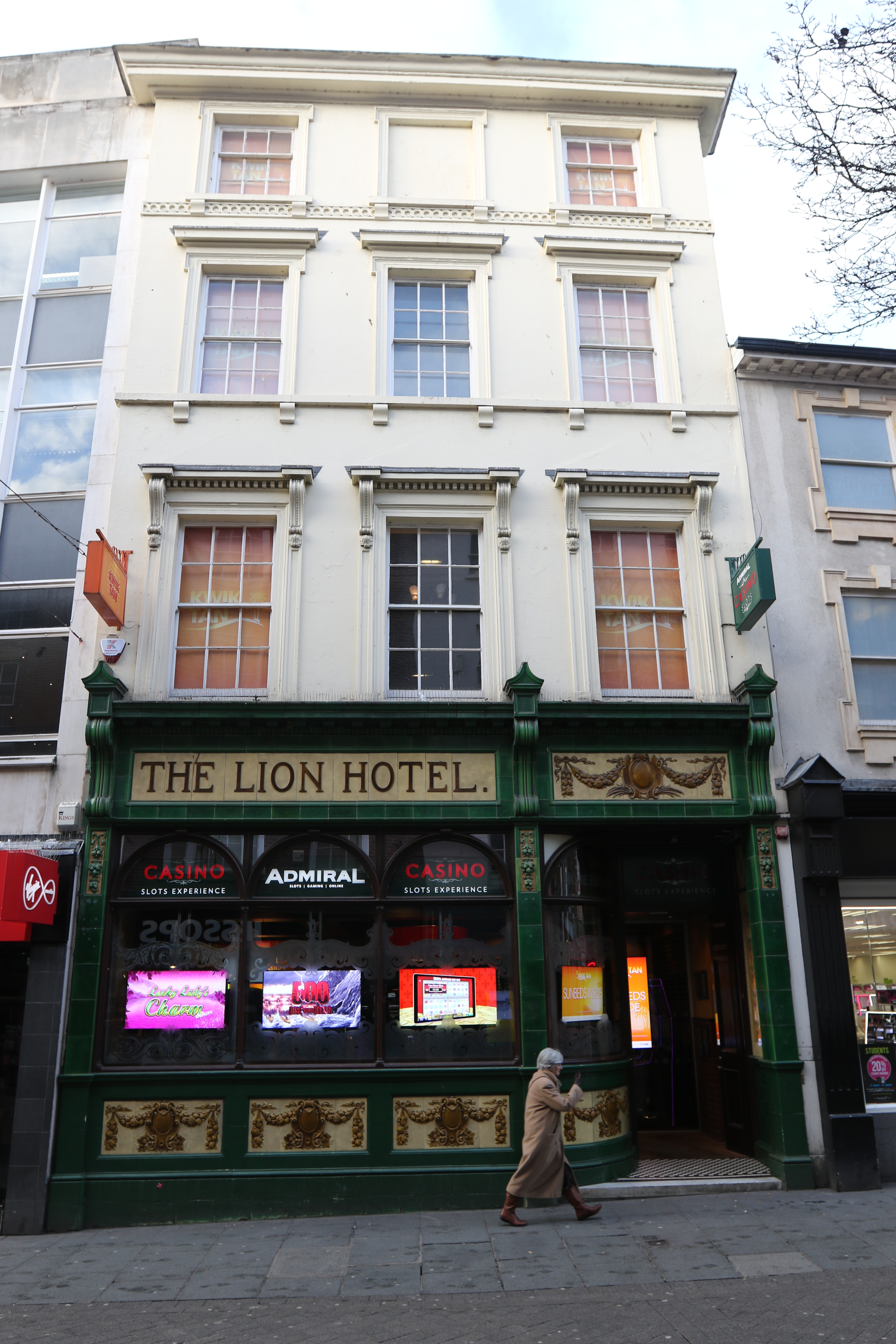
The Lion Hotel, Clumber Street (pictured in 2018), Notts County's former headquarters, where the team returned on the evening of the game

The Notts County team returned to Nottingham via rail on the evening of the game, with the train scheduled to arrive at Nottingham Midland station at 10.30pm. Thousands of people had gathered on Nottingham's streets by the time the train arrived, over 20 minutes late. The team immediately made their way to an open carriage drawn by four horses, which was to convey them to the club's headquarters, the Lion Hotel on Clumber Street. Led by a band, the procession made slow progress towards the Lion Hotel, finally arriving after a difficult 35-minute journey through the large crowds that had come out to see it. The team soon made their way to the balcony, where the cup was displayed and three cheers for Notts were given. Among the officials present in the Lion Hotel to welcome the team were representatives of Nottingham Forest, who congratulated their rivals on their victory.

The Birmingham Gazette dubbed the final "Logan's final" on account of his hat-trick, but also praised his teammates. "All the Notts forwards played well", it said. "Watson on the outside developed extraordinary talent, and the whole bunch were finely supported by the halves, Calderhead and Shelton especially. The backs, too, were in good form, whilst Toone ... never kept goal better." The Bolton Daily Chronicle lamented the failure of Bolton's half-backs: "They failed utterly and completely", it said, "and because they failed here there was not a single part of the team who could play well." Paton, it felt, had not recovered from his injury, and should not have played. Bolton's season ultimately ended with them 13th in the First Division, enough to avoid relegation. Notts County ended the season 3rd in the Second Division, but lost a "test match" with Preston North End, and so were not promoted. To conclude their season, Notts County played Rangers, the winners of the 1893–94 Scottish Cup, in what the Scottish Referee described as a "championship match". Rangers won 3–1, with Logan scoring for Notts.

Notts County became the first Second Division club to win the FA Cup, and today they are one of only eight clubs to win the FA Cup while playing outside of the highest level of the English football league system. It is Notts County's only triumph in the competition, and they have not returned to the final since. Bolton Wanderers would also lose in their next final appearance, to Manchester City in 1904, before winning the competition for the first time in 1923, beating West Ham United in the first final at Wembley Stadium. Further triumphs followed for Bolton in 1926, 1929 and 1958. Jimmy Logan's three goals made him the second player to score a hat-trick in an FA Cup final, following William Townley of Blackburn Rovers in 1890. Stan Mortensen is the only player to accomplish the feat since, doing so for Blackpool in 1953, coincidentally also against Bolton.

Two years after the final, Logan was playing for Loughborough. His team mislaid its kits on the way to a game against Newton Heath, and was consequently forced to play the match in the same clothes they had travelled in. It rained, and the Loughborough players returned home without a fresh change of clothes. Soon afterwards, Logan developed pneumonia, and he died aged 25. He was buried in a pauper's grave in Loughborough that for many years remained unmarked. Logan's gravesite was eventually located by Notts County supporters, who erected a headstone for him in 2016 following a fundraising campaign. In 2019, a gold medal awarded to George Toone, the Notts County goalkeeper in the final, was auctioned as part of a haul of memorabilia held by a supporter of the club, its estimated value being £15,000–£18,000.
