= Walter Bruce (Scottish footballer) =

Scottish footballer

Personal information
- Date of birth: 29 November 1873
- Place of birth: Bonhill, Scotland
- Date of death: 1 February 1941 (aged 67)
- Place of death: Glasgow, Scotland
- Position: Centre half

Youth career
- Bonhill Rovers

Senior career*
Years	Team	Apps	(Gls)
1891–1895	Vale of Leven		
1895–1898	Renton	33	(1)
1898–1906	St Mirren	116	(10)
Total		149	(11)

International career
1902–1903	Scottish League XI	2	(0)
- * Club domestic league appearances and goals

Walter Bruce (29 November 1873 – 1 February 1941) was a Scottish footballer who played for Vale of Leven, Renton and St Mirren as a centre half. His elder brother Daniel was also a footballer who won the English FA Cup with Notts County in 1894 and later played for St Mirren, possibly being involved in Walter's move there in 1898 after Renton resigned from the Scottish Football League earlier that season.

He never took part in a major final, reaching the semi-final stage of the Scottish Cup once with Renton (in 1896) and three times with St Mirren (1898, 1900, 1901). He did win the Dumbartonshire Cup with Renton in 1896 and played in the 1903 Glasgow Merchants Charity Cup final which St Mirren lost 5–2 to Celtic. From the next season, he lost his regular place in the Buddies side to Robert Robertson. He made 140 appearances for the Paisley team in the two major competitions and scored 13 goals.

Bruce was selected for the Scottish Football League XI in 1902 and 1903, facing the Irish League XI on both occasions.

He continued to live in his birthplace of Bonhill and worked in the Singer Corporation sewing machine factory in Clydebank until his death in 1941.
