= 1874–75 Northwich Victoria F.C. season =

Northwich Victoria
1874–75 season
- Manager: Charles James Hughes
Home colours

The 1874–75 season was Northwich Victoria's 1st season playing solely association football. Before this year, club played both rugby and association football as well as hare and hounds. The club's first game was against Stedman College on a field in the nearby village of Comberbach.

== First-team squad ==
This is the squad who played for Northwich Victoria in their first ever game.

Note: Flags indicate national team as defined under FIFA eligibility rules; some limited exceptions apply. Players may hold more than one non-FIFA nationality.

Pos.	Nation	Player
		J. Sanders
		J.W. Grange
		Ted Butterworth
		Matthew Earlam
		Charles James Hughes^{[A]}
		A. Heald
		T. Musgrave
		George A. Hughes^{[B]}
		Jon Barlow
		Joseph Barlow
		William Dobell
		G.T. Dobell
		J.Howarth

== See also ==
- List of Northwich Victoria F.C. seasons

== Notes ==
A. : Also the club's honourable secretary and treasurer.
B. : Also the club's joint honourable secretary.
