= George Toone =

George Toone is the name of:

- George Toone (footballer, born 1868), father
- George Toone (footballer, born 1893), son
