= Charles Hughes =

Charles Hughes may refer to:

== Politics ==
- Charles Hughes (congressman) (1822–1887), U.S. representative from New York
- Charles Hughes (California politician), member-elect of the California State Assembly
- Charles Evans Hughes (1862–1948), chief justice of the U.S. Supreme Court, secretary of state, governor of New York
- Charles Evans Hughes Jr. (1889–1950), U.S. solicitor general
- Charles J. Hughes Jr. (1853–1911), U.S. senator from Colorado

== Sports ==
- Charles James Hughes (footballer) (1853–1916), English footballer, referee, and co-founder of Northwich Victoria Football Club
- Charlie Hughes (baseball) (1906–1981), American baseball player
- Charles Hughes (football manager) (1933–2024), English football coach and author
- Charlie Hughes (footballer, born 1939), English football goalkeeper
- Charlie Hughes (footballer, born 2003), English football centre-back for Wigan
- Chuck Hughes (1943–1971), American football player

== Other ==
- Charles Hughes (actor), actor who played Young Peter Pettigrew in Harry Potter and the Order of the Phoenix
- Charlie Hughes (sound engineer) (born 1965), American audio engineer and inventor
- Charles Hughes (Royal Navy officer) (died 1819), British Royal Navy officer
- Charles A. Hughes (1881–1953), Detroit businessman and ice hockey executive
- Charles Anthony Hughes (1890–1967), American actor
- Charles Evans Hughes III (1915–1985), American architect
- Charles Frederick Hughes (1866–1934), U.S. Navy admiral
  - USS Charles F. Hughes, a Benson-class destroyer in the United States Navy
- Chuck Hughes (chef) (born 1976), French-Canadian chef, television personality, and restaurateur

== See also ==
- Charles James Hughes (disambiguation)
