= 1880–81 Northwich Victoria F.C. season =

Northwich Victoria
1880–81 season
- Welsh Cup: Semi-final
- Cheshire Senior Cup: Winners
- Top goalscorer: League: All: Earlam (8)
Home colours

The 1880–81 season was Northwich Victoria's 7th season, however the club was not a member of an organised league and played only challenge matches organised on an ad hoc basis. The club won the Cheshire Senior Cup, then known as the Cheshire County Football Association Challenge Cup, for the second successive season. They also participated in the Welsh Cup for the third time, reaching the semi-final. The side was captained by Matthew Earlam for the 7th successive season. He was also the joint top goalscorer for the season with 8 goals.

== First-team squad ==
This is the squad who won the Cheshire County Football Association Challenge Cup (Cheshire Senior Cup).

Note: Flags indicate national team as defined under FIFA eligibility rules; some limited exceptions apply. Players may hold more than one non-FIFA nationality.

Pos.	Nation	Player
		William Dobell
		Alf Atherton
		Ted Butterworth
		Matthew Earlam
		Charles J. Hughes^{[A]}
		J. Hitchen
		T. Musgrave
		George A. Hughes^{[B]}
		T. Capper
		Fred Russell
		W.H. Spruce
		George Plant
		Fred W. Hughes

== Notes ==
A.: Also the club's honorable secretary and treasurer.
B.: Also the club's joint honorable secretary.

== See also ==
- List of Northwich Victoria F.C. seasons
