= Robert Robertson (footballer) =

Scottish footballer

- 1909 cigarette card depicting Robertson

Personal information
- Date of birth: c. 1880
- Position: Centre half

Senior career*
Years	Team	Apps	(Gls)
–	Renfrew Victoria		
1901–1912	St Mirren	253	(15)

International career
1909	Scottish League XI	1	(0)
- * Club domestic league appearances and goals

Robert Robertson was a Scottish footballer whose only club at the professional level was St Mirren, where he spent eleven seasons (all in the Scottish Football League's top division), making 296 appearances for the Buddies in the two major competitions and scoring 18 goals. His position was mainly as a centre half, although early in his career he was an inside forward before displacing the established 'pivot' Walter Bruce; he took part in the 1903 Glasgow Merchants Charity Cup final and the 1908 Scottish Cup Final, both of which St Mirren lost heavily to Celtic (5–2 and 5–1 respectively). After retiring as a player, he served the Paisley club as a director.

Robertson was selected once for the Scottish Football League XI against the Irish League XI in 1909.
