= Alex Paton =

Scottish footballer

Personal information
- Full name: Alexander Paton
- Date of birth: 13 August 1869
- Place of birth: Bonhill, Scotland
- Date of death: 1935 (aged 65–66)
- Position: Right half

Senior career*
Years	Team	Apps	(Gls)
- Vale of Leven
- West Manchester
1890–1899	Bolton Wanderers	215	(15)
- * Club domestic league appearances and goals

Alexander Paton (13 August 1869 – 1935) was a Scottish footballer who played in the Football League for Bolton Wanderers in the 1890s as a right half; he featured for the club over 200 times in the league, as well as on the losing side in the 1894 FA Cup Final.

His elder brother Jim and younger brother Dan were both footballers, the former playing in the 1890 Scottish Cup Final and the latter winning the 1895 Scottish Cup Final and appearing once for Scotland.
