= Daniel Paton =

Scottish footballer

Personal information
- Full name: Daniel John Ferguson Paton
- Date of birth: 3 December 1871
- Place of birth: Bonhill, Scotland
- Date of death: 9 August 1957 (aged 85)
- Place of death: Alexandria, Scotland
- Position: Forward

Senior career*
Years	Team	Apps	(Gls)
1889-1890	Vale of Leven		
1889–1891	Aston Villa	3	(1)
1893–1898	St Bernard's	55	(19)
1898	Aston Villa		
1898–1900	Clyde	13	(3)
1900–1902	Vale of Leven		

International career
1896	Scotland	1	(1)
- * Club domestic league appearances and goals

Daniel John Ferguson Paton (3 December 1871 – 9 August 1957) was a Scottish footballer who played in the Football League for Aston Villa. He made one appearance for Scotland in 1896 while playing club football for St Bernard's in Edinburgh, where he also won the Scottish Cup a year earlier. He began and ended his career at Vale of Leven and also featured for Clyde.

Some publications assert that Robert Paton, also an international from the same neighbourhood, was his brother, but this is incorrect; however his actual elder brothers were footballers: Alex had several seasons with Bolton Wanderers, and Jim also played for Vale of Leven and made one appearance for Aston Villa.

== Aston Villa ==
Daniel Paton made his Football League debut for Aston Villa on 17 March 1890 when they made the trip to the Victoria Ground, Stoke-on-Trent. Paton played at centre-forward. The match ended 1–1.

Paton made two appearances for Aston Villa early in the 1890–91 season, both at centre-forward. The Lancashire Evening Post of 11 October 1890 reported on the Aston Villa vs Everton match, played at Wellington Road on that day: "There were fully 12,000 spectators present, and a great enthusiasm was evinced. Paton re-appeared for the Villa, as did Albert Brown. Everton played their full strength team. At four o'clock Paton kicked off uphill for the Villa, and, with a grand, pretty run, nearly scored, the final shot shaving the post". The match ended 2–2, Paton scoring one of his side's goals. Paton's final appearance was on 18 October 1890; Villa travelled to the County Ground, Derby and lost a very high-scoring match 5–4.

Paton was re-signed by Villa in 1898 but was never selected to play.

== Statistics ==
Club	Season	Division	League		FA Cup		Total	
Club	Season	Division	Apps	Goals	Apps	Goals	Apps	Goals
Aston Villa	1889–90	The Football League	1	0	-	-	1	0
Aston Villa	1890–91	Football League	2	1	-	-	2	1
Aston Villa	1898–99	First Division	0	0	0	0	0	0
