= Charles James Hughes =

Charles James Hughes may refer to:

- Charles J. Hughes Jr. (1853–1911), Democratic U.S. Senator from Colorado
- Charles James Hughes (footballer) (1853–1916), English footballer, referee, and co-founder of Northwich Victoria Football Club
