= 1893–94 FA Cup =

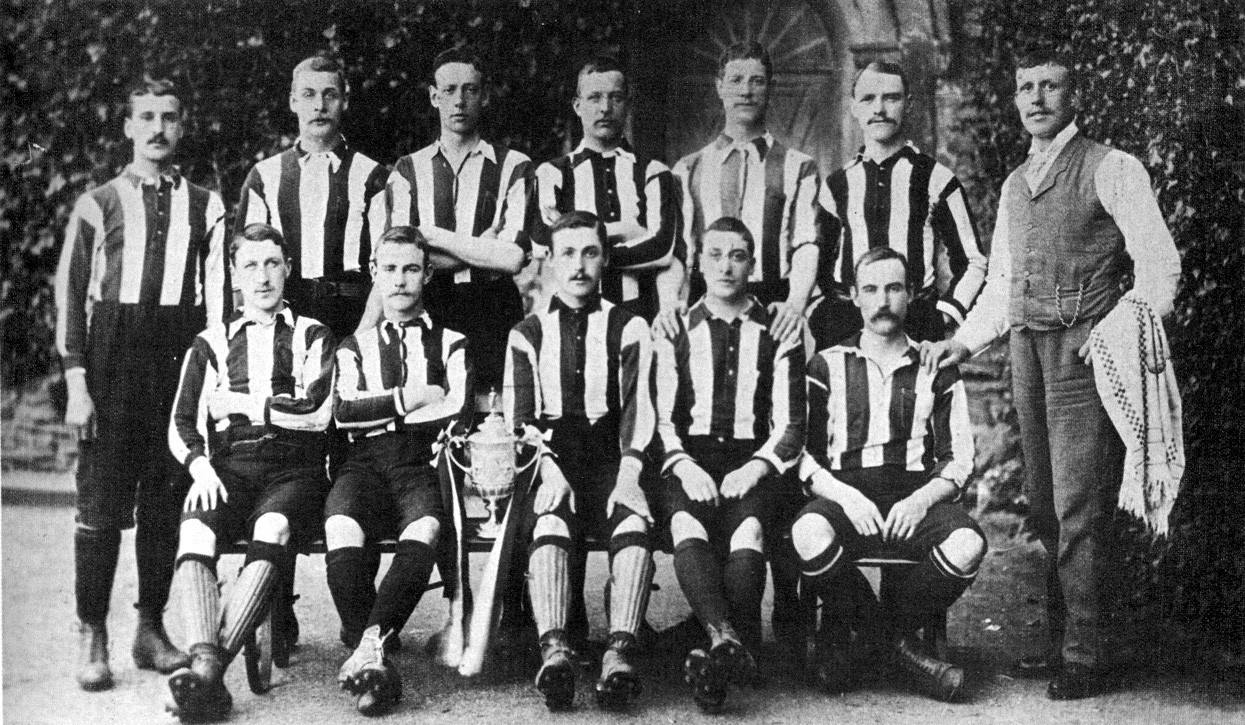
- Notts County following the final

Tournament details
- Country: England; Wales

Final positions
- Champions: Notts County (1st title)
- Runners-up: Bolton Wanderers

The 1893–94 FA Cup was the 23rd edition of the world's oldest football knockout competition, the Football Association Challenge Cup, or FA Cup. The cup was won by Notts County of the Football League Second Division, who defeated Bolton Wanderers 4–1 in the final to win the cup for the first and, to date, only time.

Matches were scheduled to be played at the stadium of the team named first on the date specified for each round, which was always a Saturday. Some matches, however, might be rescheduled for other days if there were clashes with games for other competitions or the weather was inclement. If scores were level after 90 minutes had been played, a replay would take place at the stadium of the second-named team later the same week. If the replayed match was drawn further replays would be held until a winner was determined. If scores were level after 90 minutes had been played in a replay, a 30-minute period of extra time would be played.

== Calendar ==
Round	Date	No. of teams
First qualifying round	Saturday 14 October 1893	106
Second qualifying round	Saturday 4 November 1893	80
Third qualifying round	Saturday 25 November 1893	40
Fourth qualifying round	Saturday 16 December 1893	20
First round proper	Saturday 27 January 1894	32
Second round proper	Saturday 10 February 1894	16
Third round proper	Saturday 24 February 1894	8
Semi-finals	Saturday 10 March 1894	4
Final	Saturday 31 March 1894	2

== Qualifying rounds ==
The 16 clubs from the Football League First Division were exempted from the qualifying rounds, as were Liverpool, Small Heath, Notts County, Middlesbrough Ironopolis and Newcastle United from the Second Division. The Second Division featured 15 clubs this season following Bootle's resignation from the Football League after the Annual General Meeting. Most of the rest of the League clubs entered the FA Cup at the first qualifying round stage, although Crewe Alexandra and Northwich Victoria joined in the second qualifying round.

Grimsby Town and Woolwich Arsenal were ultimately the only League clubs to progress to the competition proper, with non-League sides Middlesbrough, South Shore, Stockport County, Heanor Town, Leicester Fosse, Burton Wanderers, Luton Town and Reading being the other qualifiers. Stockport County and Leicester Fosse were appearing at this stage for the first time while Accrington received a bye to the first round despite the club also having resigned from the Football League during the 1893 close-season.

== Results ==
=== First round proper ===
Tie No.	Home team	Score	Away team	Date
1	Liverpool	3–0	Grimsby Town	27 January 1894
2	Preston North End	18–0	Reading	27 January 1894
3	Stoke	1–0	Everton	27 January 1894
4	Notts County	1–0	Burnley	27 January 1894
5	Nottingham Forest	1–0	Heanor Town	27 January 1894
6	Aston Villa	4–2	Wolverhampton Wanderers	27 January 1894
7	West Bromwich Albion	2–3	Blackburn Rovers	27 January 1894
8	Sunderland	3–0	Accrington	27 January 1894
9	Derby County	2–0	Darwen	27 January 1894
10	Newton Heath	4–0	Middlesbrough	27 January 1894
11	Small Heath	3–4	Bolton Wanderers	27 January 1894
12	Leicester Fosse	2–1	South Shore	27 January 1894
13	Middlesbrough Ironopolis	2–1	Luton Town	27 January 1894
14	Woolwich Arsenal	1–2	The Wednesday	27 January 1894
15	Stockport County	0–1	Burton Wanderers	27 January 1894
16	Newcastle United	2–0	Sheffield United	27 January 1894

=== Second round proper ===
Tie No.	Home team	Score	Away team	Date
1	Liverpool	3–2	Preston North End	10 February 1894
2	Nottingham Forest	2–0	Middlesbrough Ironopolis	10 February 1894
3	The Wednesday	1–0	Stoke	10 February 1894
4	Sunderland	2–2	Aston Villa	10 February 1894
Replay	Aston Villa	3–1	Sunderland	21 February 1894
5	Burton Wanderers	1–2	Notts County	10 February 1894
6	Newton Heath	0–0	Blackburn Rovers	10 February 1894
Replay	Blackburn Rovers	5–1	Newton Heath	17 February 1894
7	Leicester Fosse	0–0	Derby County	10 February 1894
Replay	Derby County	3–0	Leicester Fosse	17 February 1894
8	Newcastle United	1–2	Bolton Wanderers	10 February 1894

=== Third round proper ===
Tie No.	Home team	Score	Away team	Date
1	Nottingham Forest	1–1	Notts County	24 February 1894
Replay	Notts County	4–1	Nottingham Forest	3 March 1894
2	The Wednesday	3–2	Aston Villa	24 February 1894
3	Bolton Wanderers	3–0	Liverpool	24 February 1894
4	Derby County	1–4	Blackburn Rovers	24 February 1894

=== Semi-finals ===
Tie No.	Home team	Score	Away team	Date
1	Notts County	1–0	Blackburn Rovers	10 March 1894
2	Bolton Wanderers	2–1	The Wednesday	10 March 1894

=== Final ===
The 1894 FA Cup Final was a football match played on 31 March 1894. The final was contested by Notts County and Bolton Wanderers at Goodison Park, Liverpool. Notts County won 4–1 with Jimmy Logan becoming the second player to ever score a hat-trick at an FA Cup Final

==== Match details ====
31 March 1894

Notts County	4–1	Bolton Wanderers
Watson 18'; Logan 29' 67' 70'		Cassidy 87'

Goodison Park
Attendance: 37,000
