= Archie Osborne =

Scottish footballer

Personal information
- Full name: Archibald Samuel Osborne
- Date of birth: 1869
- Place of birth: Bonhill, Scotland
- Date of death: 1913 (aged 43–44)
- Position: Wing half

Senior career*
Years	Team	Apps	(Gls)
1888–1890	Vale of Leven		
1890–1894	Notts County	46	(1)
1894–1895	Clyde	8	(0)
- * Club domestic league appearances and goals

Archibald Samuel Osborne (1869 – 1913) was a Scottish footballer who played in the Football League for Notts County. He was unfortunate to feature on the losing side for the club in the 1891 FA Cup Final, having also finished as runner-up in the 1890 Scottish Cup Final with Vale of Leven. He was still playing for the Magpies in the 1893–94 season when they reached the showpiece event again, but this time did not take part as the club claimed victory (his former Vale of Leven teammate Daniel Bruce was on the field). He later returned to Scotland for a short spell with Clyde.
