= Harry Walkerdine =

English footballer

Personal information
- Full name: Henry Walkerdine
- Date of birth: 21 January 1870
- Place of birth: Nottingham, England
- Date of death: 7 November 1949 (aged 79)
- Place of death: Mansfield, England
- Position: Forward

Senior career*
Years	Team	Apps	(Gls)
- Gainsborough Trinity
1889–1893	Notts County	38	(16)
- * Club domestic league appearances and goals

Henry Walkerdine (1870–1949) was an English footballer who played in the Football League for Notts County.

Harry Walkerdine played and scored in the first Football League match between Notts County and Nottingham Forest at Trent Bridge on 8 October 1892 watched by 18,000 in which Notts won 3–0.

After his football career finished, Walkerdine became a journalist in Mansfield.
