= Jimmy Logan (footballer) =

Scottish footballer

Personal information
- Full name: James Merrilees Logan
- Date of birth: 10 August 1893
- Place of birth: Glasgow, Scotland
- Date of death: 1968 (aged 74–75)
- Position: Right half

Senior career*
Years	Team	Apps	(Gls)
–	Glencraig Celtic		
–	Cowdenbeath		
1919–1929	Plymouth Argyle	263	(15)
1929–19??	Yeovil & Petters United		
- * Club domestic league appearances and goals

James Logan (1893–1968) was a Scottish professional footballer who played in the English Football League for Plymouth Argyle in the 1920s. He played as a right half.

Logan was born in Glasgow. He played in Fife for Scottish Junior Football Association club Glencraig Celtic and for Scottish League club Cowdenbeath, before coming to England in 1919 to play for Plymouth Argyle, then a Southern League club. He made 279 appearances for the club in all competitions. Logan played in Argyle's first game in the Football League, as the Southern League Division One clubs were absorbed to form the Football League Third Division for the 1920–21 season, and went on to play 228 Football League games. He made his last appearance for Argyle in December 1928 and joined Yeovil & Petters United the following year.
