= Jim Wilson (winger) =

Scottish footballer

Personal information
- Full name: Jim Wilson
- Place of birth: Scotland
- Position: Winger

Senior career*
Years	Team	Apps	(Gls)
1891–1892	Ayr Parkhouse		
1892–1894	Bolton Wanderers	36	(7)
1894	Millwall Athletic		
Total		36	(7)
- * Club domestic league appearances and goals

Jim Wilson was a Scottish footballer who played in the Football League for Bolton Wanderers.
