= List of Northwich Victoria F.C. seasons =

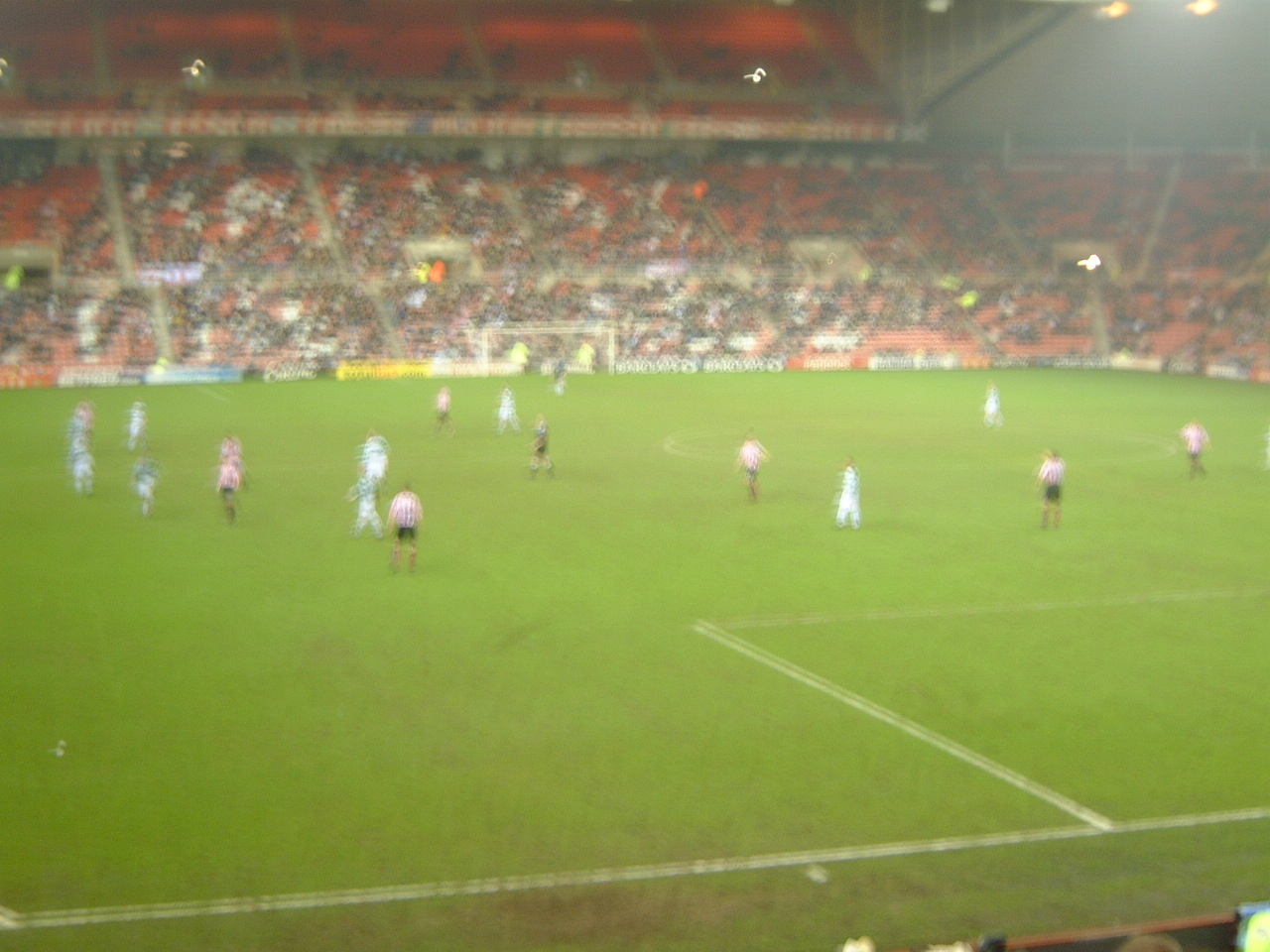
Northwich Victoria playing against Premier League side Sunderland at the Stadium of Light in the Third Round of the FA Cup on 7 January 2006.

Northwich Victoria Football Club are an English football club based in Northwich, Cheshire. They are currently competing in the Northern Premier League Premier Division. The club was founded in 1874, playing challenge matches organised on an ad hoc basis until the 1877 season, when they entered the Welsh Cup for the first time. The club entered two other competitions (The Cheshire Senior Cup in 1879 and the FA Cup in 1882) before finally playing league football in The Combination in 1890, for which they were founding members. They became founding members of the Football League Second Division in 1892, where the club remained for two seasons, and are the only two seasons in the club's history where they have played professionally and in the English Football League. In the 1894 season, they returned to amateur, regional football when they rejoined the Combination. Two season in the Cheshire League followed until the turn of the century, when Northwich joined the Manchester League in 1900, when they finished as runners-up. Two seasons later, for the first time, they won a league trophy as winners of the Manchester League in 1902. They departed the Manchester League in 1912 when they joined the second division of the Lancashire Combination, finishing 4th in the first season, which ensured their promotion to the first division. In 1919, they became founder members of the Cheshire County League, where they remained until the 1968 season, winning the league just once in the 1956–57 season. Following their departure from the Cheshire County League, they became founder members of the Northern Premier League. In 1979, they founded yet another league, the Alliance Premier League (now known as the Football Conference, where they remained until their relegation in the 2004–05 season. During their time in the Conference, they won the FA Trophy in the 1983–84 season, and finished runners-up twice in 1982 and 1995. They returned to the Conference National at their first attempt when they won the Conference North in the 2005–06 season. However, ongoing financial issues in the latter part of the 2000s saw them relegated twice in two season; in 2009 they were relegated back to the Conference North and then again the following season to the Northern Premier League Premier Division, where they are competing for the current season.

== Key ==
1st	2nd	↑	↓
Champions	Runners-up	Promoted	Relegated

Key to league record:

- P – Played
- W – Games won
- D – Games drawn
- L – Games lost
- F – Goals for
- A – Goals against
- Pts – Points
- Pos – Final position
- ↑ – Promoted
- ↓ – Relegated

Key to divisions:

- Combination = The Combination
- Div 2 = Football League Second Division
- Ch League = Cheshire League
- CL Div 1 = Cheshire League Division 1
- Mcr League = Manchester League
- LC Div 2 = Lancashire Combination
- LC Div 1 = Lancashire Combination
- LC Div 1 (Mcr) = Lancashire Combination Division 1 (Manchester section)
- CCL = Cheshire County League
- CCL 1939 W = Cheshire County League (West) 1939
- CCL 1940 W = Cheshire County League (West) 1940
- NPL = Northern Premier League
- Alliance = Alliance Premier League
- Conference = Football Conference
- Conf North = Conference North
- NPL Prem = Northern Premier League Premier Division
- NWC Premier = North West Counties Football League Premier Division

Key to rounds:

- EP = Extra Preliminary Round
- PRE = Preliminary Round
- QR1 = First Qualifying Round
- QR2 = Second Qualifying Round
- QR3 = Third Qualifying Round
- QR4 = Fourth Qualifying Round
- R1 = Round 1
- R2 = Round 2
- R3 = Round 3
- R4 = Round 4
- R5 = Round 5
- R6 = Round 6
- QF = Quarter-finals
- SF = Semi-finals
- RU = Runners-up

== Seasons ==
Season	League									FA Cup	FA Trophy	Cheshire Senior Cup	Other competitions	
Season	Division	P	W	D	L	F	A	Pts	Pos	FA Cup	FA Trophy	Cheshire Senior Cup	Other competitions	
1877–78	n/a (Note: The club did not play league football until 1890.)									DNE			Welsh Cup	R1
1878–79										DNE				
1879–80										DNE		W	Welsh Cup	R1
1880–81 Details										DNE		W	Welsh Cup	SF
1881–82										DNE		W	Welsh Cup	RU
1882–83										R2		W	Welsh Cup	SF
1883–84										QF		W	Welsh Cup	R1
1884–85										R1		W	Welsh Cup	SF
1885–86										R1		R2	Welsh Cup	R3
1886–87										R2		R2	Welsh Cup	SF
1887–88										R2		SF	Welsh Cup	SF
1888–89										QR2		W	Welsh Cup	RU
1889–90										QR3		R1	Welsh Cup	R1
1890–91	Combination	16	5	7	4	28	30	17	6th	QR2		SF	Welsh Cup	R2
1891–92	Combination	22	15	1	6	84	25	17	2nd	QR4		RU		
1892–93 Details	Div 2	22	9	2	11	42	58	20	7th	R2		SF		
1893–94 Details	Div 2	28	3	3	22	30	98	9	15th	QR2		SF		
1894–95	Combination	20	4	2	14	26	55	10	11th	QR1		SF		
1895–96	Combination	14	4	1	9	14	35	9	6th	QR2		SF		
1896–97	Combination	18	8	2	8	31	41	18	4th	QR1		RU		
1897–98	Combination	24	6	2	16	40	74	14	13th	QR1		R1		
1898–99	Ch League	17	5	5	7	33	30	15	8th	DNE		R2		
1899–1900	CL Div 1	13	7	5	1	31	11	19	2nd	DNE		R3		
1900–01	Mcr League	28	20	4	4	75	36	44	2nd	DNE		SF		
1901–02	Mcr League	26	16	2	8	61	53	34	3rd	DNE		R1		
1902–03	Mcr League	26	20	4	2	59	22	44	1st	DNE		R2		
1903–04	Mcr League	28	17	4	7	69	40	38	2nd	DNE		R1		
1904–05	Mcr League	30	13	10	7	47	43	36	7th	DNE		R2		
1905–06	Mcr League	30	17	3	10	67	58	37	4th	DNE		RU		
1906–07	Mcr League	28	12	6	10	59	51	30	6th	DNE		R4		
1907–08	Mcr League	30	15	10	5	75	53	40	2nd	DNE		R3		
1908–09	Mcr League	30	17	4	9	73	51	38	2nd	DNE		RU		
1909–10	Mcr League	34	18	4	12	81	65	40	7th	DNE		R3		
1910–11	Mcr League	30	16	5	9	75	41	37	4th	DNE		R3		
1911–12	Mcr League	24	14	5	5	51	32	33	2nd	DNE		R1		
1912–13	LC Div 2	34	18	9	7	101	43	45	4th ↑	QR4		SF		
1913–14	LC Div 1	34	21	5	8	65	36	47	3rd	PRE		R1		
1914–15	LC Div 1	32	16	6	10	71	50	38	5th	R1		R2		
No competitive football was played between 1915 and 1918 due to the First World War.
1918–19	LC Div 1 (Mcr)	12	3	0	9	15	29	6	7th	DNE		QF		
1919–20	CCL	22	5	5	12	33	44	15	12th	PRE		R2		
1920–21	CCL	34	12	5	17	53	60	29	13th	PRE		R1		
1921–22	CCL	38	15	10	13	62	40	40	7th	QR3		R1		
1922–23	CCL	38	8	10	20	47	75	26	18th	QR1		R2		
1923–24	CCL	42	18	10	14	85	77	46	6th	QR2		R1		
1924–25	CCL	42	25	6	11	94	58	56	2nd	QR3		R3		
1925–26	CCL	42	14	5	23	75	101	33	18th	DNE		R1		
1926–27	CCL	42	11	4	27	70	141	26	18th	DNE		R1		
1927–28	CCL	42	10	9	23	88	136	29	18th	DNE		R1		
1928–29	CCL	38	13	7	18	85	90	33	14th	QR2		W		
1929–30	CCL	42	19	2	21	95	111	40	12th	PRE		R2		
1930–31	CCL	42	15	3	24	105	135	33	17th	PRE		R1		
1931–32	CCL	40	10	7	23	76	122	27	19th	QR1		R1		
1932–33	CCL	42	17	6	19	100	123	40	15th	QR1		R1		
1933–34	CCL	42	14	2	26	63	87	30	20th	QR1		R1		
1934–35	CCL	42	14	7	21	83	95	35	16th	QR4		R3		
1935–36	CCL	42	20	10	12	98	74	50	7th	QR4		R2		
1936–37	CCL	42	27	3	12	92	52	57	3rd	QR4		W		
1937–38	CCL	42	19	6	17	86	79	44	8th	DNE		R2		
1938–39	CCL	42	20	7	15	88	87	47	8th	QR4		R2		
1939–40	CCL 1939 W	13	6	3	4	23	26	15	5th	DNE		RU		
1939–40	CCL 1940 W	14	5	1	8	20	33	11	6th	DNE		RU		
No football was played in the Cheshire County League between 1940 and 1945 due to the Second World War.
1945–46	CCL	38	16	4	18	79	102	36	11th	QR1		R1		
1946–47	CCL	42	21	11	10	95	69	53	5th	QR1		R3		
1947–48	CCL	42	24	9	9	109	58	57	2nd	QR1		RU		
1948–49	CCL	42	26	9	7	118	67	61	3rd	QR2		R1		
1949–50	CCL	42	22	7	13	101	61	51	4th	QR1		W		
1950–51	CCL	42	27	5	10	116	58	59	3rd	QR4		RU		
1951–52	CCL	42	21	6	15	78	70	48	6th	QR2		R1		
1952–53	CCL	42	13	8	21	61	82	34	16th	QR1		R2		
1953–54	CCL	42	13	7	22	72	97	33	19th	QR1		R1		
1954–55	CCL	42	11	6	25	68	117	28	21st	QR1		W		
1955–56	CCL	42	21	10	10	99	70	54	4th	R1		R2		
1956–57	CCL	42	25	7	10	139	72	57	1st	PRE		SF		
1957–58	CCL	42	22	10	10	91	56	54	3rd	QR2		SF		
1958–59	CCL	38	16	7	15	96	74	39	10th	QR1		R1		
1959–60	CCL	38	17	11	10	70	44	45	6th	QR2		SF		
1960–61	CCL	42	20	6	16	93	84	46	12th	QR1		SF		
1961–62	CCL	42	25	5	12	103	56	55	4th	R1		R1		
1962–63	CCL	42	15	15	12	77	68	45	9th	QR1		R1		
1963–64	CCL	42	13	6	23	64	87	32	19th	QR3		RU		
1964–65	CCL	42	18	6	18	100	87	42	11th	QR2		SF		
1965–66	CCL	42	20	6	16	93	77	46	7th	QR2		RU		
1966–67	CCL	42	22	13	7	91	55	57	3rd	QR3		R2		
1967–68	CCL	42	22	6	14	82	64	50	7th	QR1		R1		
1968–69	NPL	38	16	5	17	59	82	37	13th	QR4		RU		
1969–70	NPL	38	15	8	15	60	66	38	9th	QR3	R1	R1		
1970–71	NPL	42	22	5	15	71	55	49	6th	QR1	R2	RU		
1971–72	NPL	46	20	14	12	65	59	54	5th	QR1	R1	W		
1972–73	NPL	46	17	15	14	74	62	49	8th	PRE	QR3	R1		
1973–74	NPL	46	14	13	19	68	75	41	16th	QR2	R2	SF		
1974–75	NPL	46	18	12	16	83	71	48	9th	QR1	R2	R2		
1975–76	NPL	46	17	17	12	79	59	51	11th	QR3	R1	R2		
1976–77	NPL	44	27	11	6	85	43	65	2nd	R4	R1	W		
1977–78	NPL	46	22	14	10	83	55	58	6th	QR4	R1	RU		
1978–79	NPL	44	18	11	15	64	52	47	10th	QR4	R2	W	Staffordshire Senior Cup	W
1979–80	Alliance	38	16	10	12	50	38	42	8th	R2	R1	R2	Staffordshire Senior Cup Conference League Cup	W W
1980–81	Alliance	38	17	11	10	53	40	45	4th	R1	R3	SF		
1981–82	Alliance	42	20	9	13	56	46	69	6th	QR4	SF	R2		
1982–83	Alliance	42	18	10	14	68	63	64	8th	R2	RU	R2		
1983–84	Alliance	42	16	14	12	54	47	51	7th	R1	W	W		
1984–85	Alliance	42	16	11	15	50	46	50	9th	R2	R1	SF		
1985–86	Alliance	42	10	12	20	42	54	37	16th	QR4	R2	RU		
1986–87	Conference	42	10	14	18	53	69	44	17th	QR4	R1	SF	Staffordshire Senior Cup	RU
1987–88	Conference	42	10	17	15	46	57	47	17th	R2	R1	SF		
1988–89	Conference	40	14	11	15	64	65	53	10th	R2	R2	R2		
1989–90	Conference	42	15	5	22	51	67	50	15th	R2	R1	QF	Staffordshire Senior Cup	W
1990–91	Conference	42	13	13	16	65	75	52	12th	QR4	QF	SF	Staffordshire Senior Cup	RU
1991–92	Conference	42	16	6	20	63	58	54	11th	QR1	R3			
1992–93	Conference	42	16	8	18	68	55	56	11th	QR2	R1	R3	Conference League Cup	W
1993–94	Conference	42	11	19	12	44	45	52	15th	QR1	R1	W		
1994–95	Conference	42	14	15	13	77	66	57	10th	R1	R1			
1995–96	Conference	42	16	12	14	72	64	60	8th	R1	RU	R2		
1996–97	Conference	42	17	12	13	61	54	63	6th	R1	R2	R1		
1997–98	Conference	42	15	15	12	63	59	60	9th	R1	R3	SF		
1998–99	Conference	42	19	9	14	60	51	66	7th	QR3	QF	RU		
1999–2000	Conference	42	13	12	17	53	78	51	18th	QR4	R2	R1		
2000–01	Conference	42	11	13	18	49	67	46	17th	R2	R3	R2		
2001–02	Conference	42	16	7	19	57	70	55	13th	R1	QF	R1		
2002–03	Conference	42	13	12	17	66	72	51	14th	R1	R5	RU		
2003–04	Conference	42	4	11	27	30	80	23	22nd	R1	R3			
2004–05	Conference	42	14	10	18	58	72	42	19th ↓ (Note: Relegated due to ongoing financial issues.)	QR4	R4			
2005–06	Conf North	42	29	5	8	97	49	92	1st ↑	R3	R2			
2006–07	Conference	46	18	4	24	51	69	58	13th	R1	SF	RU		
2007–08	Conference	46	11	11	24	52	78	44	19th	R1	R1	QF		
2008–09	Conference	46	11	10	25	56	75	43	22nd ↓	QR4	R1	R1		
2009–10	Conf North	40	15	13	12	62	55	48 (Note: 10 points deducted for entering administration, relegated for unsettled debts.)	12th ↓	R2	QR3	W	Mid-Cheshire Senior Cup	W
2010–11	NPL Prem	42	18	9	15	66	55	53	12th	QR2	R1	W	Evostik Challenge Cup Mid-Cheshire Senior Cup	RU W
2011–12	NPL Prem	42	26	8	6	73	43	83	2nd ↓	QR2	QF		Evostik Challenge Cup Mid-Cheshire Senior Cup	
2012–13	NPL South	42	19	10	13	88	58	67	8th	PRE	QR1			
2013–14	NPL North	42	16	15	11	73	52	63	9th	QR1	R1			
2014–15	NPL North	42	25	7	10	75	39	82	4th	QR1	QR1			
2015–16	NPL North	42	29	5	8	102	41	83 (Note: 9 points deducted for fielding an ineligible player in three matches.)	3rd (Note: Beat Glossop North End 2–1 in the semi-final before losing 2–0 to Spennymoor Town in the 2016 Northern Premier League Division One North play-off Final.)	R2	QR1			
2016–17	NPL South	42	8	12	22	53	89	26 (Note: 10 points deducted for entering into administration.)	22nd ↓	PRE	PRE			
2017–18	NWC Premier	44	17	5	22	77	93	56	16th	EP			FA Vase	QR1
2018–19	NWC Premier	38	20	7	11	85	49	67	4th	PRE			FA Vase	SF
2019–20	NWC Premier	28	11	7	10	57	43	40	10th (Note: As a result of the COVID-19 pandemic, this season's North West Counties Football League was formally abandoned, with all results from the season being expunged, and no promotion or relegation taking place.)	QR1			FA Vase	R2
2020–21	NWC Premier	7	4	1	2	12	9	13	3rd	PR			FA Vase	QR2
2021–22	NWC Premier	40	19	6	15	74	64	63	5th	PR			FA Vase	QR1
2022–23	NWC Premier	42	25	6	11	77	50	81	5th	PR			FA Vase	QR1
