= George Toone (footballer, born 1893) =

English footballer

Personal information
- Full name: George Toone
- Date of birth: 6 September 1893
- Place of birth: Nottingham, England
- Date of death: 1950 (aged 56–57)
- Position: Wing-half

Senior career*
Years	Team	Apps	(Gls)
1909–1910	Northvale		
1910–1911	Sneinton Institute		
1911–1912	Sherwood		
1912–1913	Sneinton Institute		
1913–1914	Notts County	1	(0)
1914–1915	Mansfield Mechanics		
1920–1924	Watford	165	(0)
1924–1925	Sheffield Wednesday	19	(0)
1925–1926	Ilkeston United		
1926	Scarborough Penguins		
Total		185	(0)
- * Club domestic league appearances and goals

George Toone (6 September 1893 – 1950) was an English footballer who played in the Football League for Notts County, Sheffield Wednesday and Watford. His father, also called George played professional footballer with Notts County and England.
