= Fay Harper =

English footballer

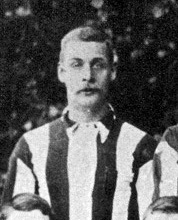

Personal information
- Full name: Theophilus Harper
- Date of birth: 14 July 1866
- Place of birth: Brierley Hill, England
- Date of death: 1950 (aged 83–84)
- Position: Full back

Senior career*
Years	Team	Apps	(Gls)
1889–1890	Mansfield Greenhalgh's		
1890–1891	Mansfield Town		
1891–1892	Notts Rangers		
1892–1895	Notts County	46	(0)
1895	Mansfield Town		
Total		46	(0)
- * Club domestic league appearances and goals

Theophilus "Fay" Harper (14 July 1866 – 1950) was an English footballer who played in the Football League for Notts County, with whom he was on the winning side in the 1894 FA Cup Final.
