= James Burke (19th-century footballer) =

English footballer

James Burke was a Scottish footballer around the turn of the 20th century.

He played in the inside left position, and began his career with Woodvale before moving on to Scottish Cup holders Third Lanark in 1889. Moving to England, he spent a season with Newark Town then appeared for Notts County in the 1892–93 season, scoring 4 times in 15 appearances.

Burke started playing for Lincoln City in 1894, and appeared in a total of 52 league games for them, scoring 7 times (including the Lincoln goal in the 1–3 home defeat to Bury in the 1894–95 season). He also played for Grantham Rovers.

He was 5 foot 6 ½ inches tall and weighed 11 stone 6 pounds.
