= Elijah Allsopp =

English footballer

Personal information
- Date of birth: 1877
- Place of birth: Derby, England
- Date of death: 1958 (aged 80–81)
- Position: Winger

Senior career*
Years	Team	Apps	(Gls)
1892	Bury	0	(0)
1893–1896	Notts County	59	(20)
- * Club domestic league appearances and goals

Elijah Allsopp (1877 - 1958) was a footballer who played in The Football League for Notts County. He also played for Bury.
