= Adam Ogilvie =

Scottish footballer

Personal information
- Date of birth: 1867
- Place of birth: Scotland
- Height: 5 ft 8 in (1.73 m)
- Position: Goalkeeper

Senior career*
| Years | Team | Apps | (Gls) |
| 1885–1888 | Forfar Athletic | | |
| 1888–1893 | Grimsby Town | 21 | (0) |
| 1893–1897 | Blackburn Rovers | 108 | (0) |
| 1897–1??? | Shrewsbury Town | | |
- * Club domestic league appearances and goals

Adam Ogilvie (1867 – after 1896) was a Scottish professional footballer who played as a goalkeeper.
