= Robert Tannahill (footballer) =

Scottish footballer

Personal information
- Full name: Robert Tannahill
- Date of birth: 29 March 1872
- Place of birth: Kilmarnock, Scotland
- Date of death: 1950 (aged 79–80)
- Position: Winger

Senior career*
Years	Team	Apps	(Gls)
1889–1892	Kilmarnock		
1892–1893	Blackburn Rovers	0	(0)
1893–1897	Bolton Wanderers	67	(8)
1897–1898	Tottenham Hotspur	11 (Note: Only included the Tottenham Hotspur Southern League caps and goals. Tannahill also had 5 appearances and 3 goals in the United League and two FA Cup appearances.)	(3)
1898–1899	Millwall Athletic		
1899–1900	Chesterfield	4	(2)
1901–1904	Fulham		
1904	Grays United		
1905	Oldham Athletic		
Total		82+	(13+)
- * Club domestic league appearances and goals

Robert Tannahill (29 March 1872 – 1950) was a Scottish footballer who played in the Football League for Bolton Wanderers and Chesterfield.

== Career ==
Tannahill started his career in Scotland for Kilmarnock. He was with Bolton Wanderers for four years and was included in the 1894 FA Cup final squad against Notts County, however Bolton lost 4–1. After moving to Tottenham Hotspur Tannahill was included in the first Southern League game against Sheppey United thus making his debut for the club. The game ended in a 2–2 draw. Tannahill lost his place in the squad to Jimmy Hartley and was released by the club in 1898.
