= Scottish Football League XI =

Representative side of the Scottish Football League

The Scottish League XI was a representative side of the Scottish Football League. The team regularly played against the (English) Football League and other national league select teams between 1892 and 1980. For a long period the annual fixture between the English and Scottish leagues was only second in importance to the matches between the two national teams. The fixture declined in importance after regular European club competition was instituted in the 1950s; matches in the 1960s and 1970s were played irregularly and poorly attended. A match involving a Scottish League XI was last played in 1990, to mark the centenary of the League.

== History ==
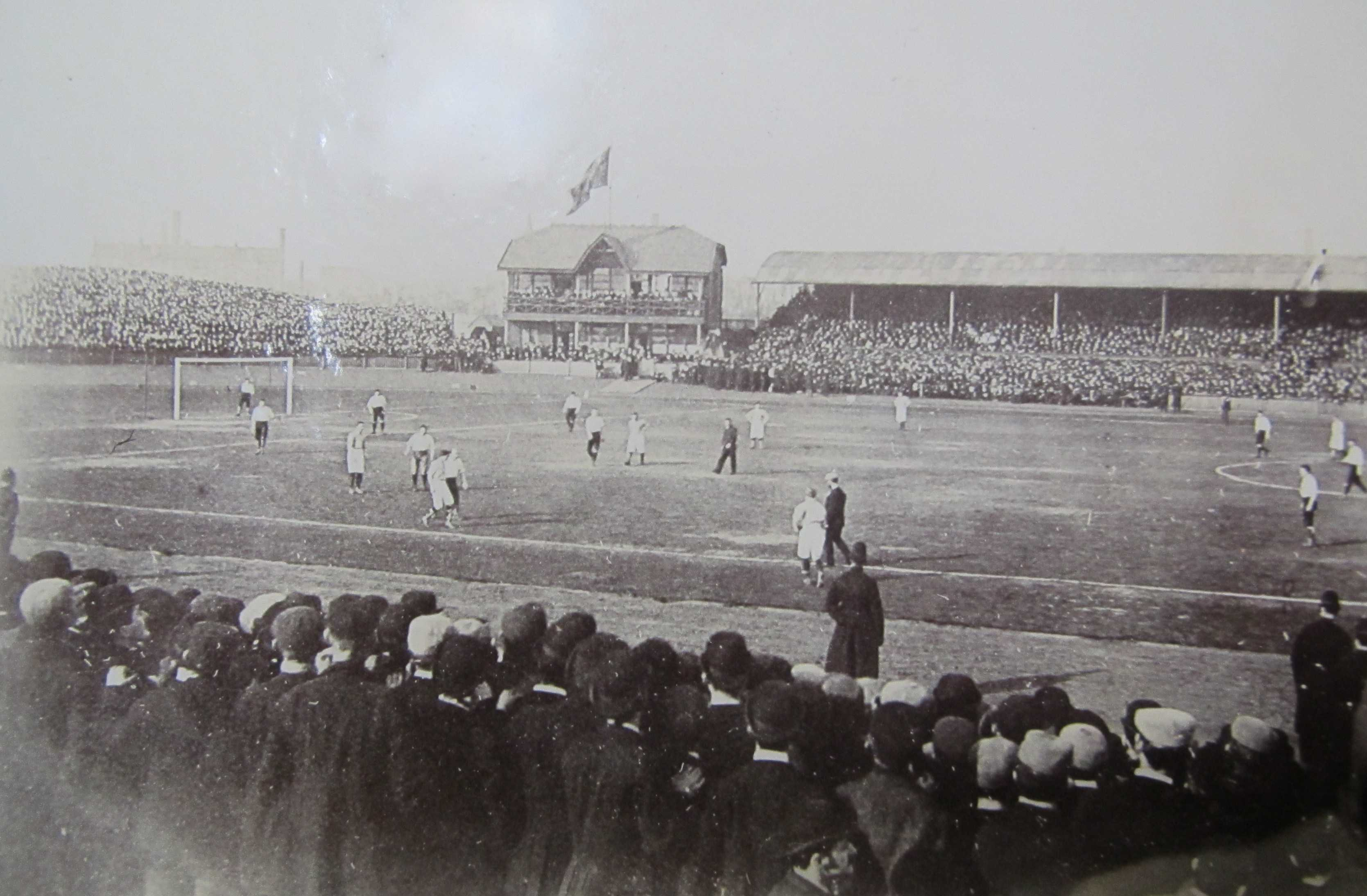
Celtic Park, pictured in 1894. The ground hosted the first home game played by the Scottish League XI, in 1893.

Soon after the creation of the Scottish Football League (SFL) in 1890, there was a desire on the part of its officials to test its strength against the more senior (English) Football League. An Anglo-Scottish league match was first played in April 1892 at Pike's Lane, (Note: Pike's Lane was the home ground of Bolton Wanderers until 1895, when the club moved to Burnden Park.) Bolton and ended in a 2–2 draw. The first Football League team contained Scottish players (Harry Gardiner, Donald Gow, Willie Groves and Tom McInnes). This practice did not continue, however, as Scots were not selected for the Football League again until the 1960s, by when the match was declining in importance. A return match was played at Celtic Park in April 1893, attracting an attendance of 31,500. In the same year, the Scottish League played its first match against the Irish League XI, in Belfast.

In the early years of organised football, clubs in the Football League were almost exclusively from northern England and the Midlands, while clubs from southern England played in the Southern Football League. The increased importance of the Southern League was reflected when a fixture was played between the Scottish League and the Southern League for the first time, at Millwall in October 1910. The Southern League won both that fixture and a match against The Football League in the same year. These matches continued until the First World War, after which the Southern League was absorbed into the Football League. Frederick Wall, the secretary of the Football Association, wrote to the SFL in 1913 objecting to the use of the term "international" in describing matches between the Scottish League and the Football League. The SFL defended their right to use the term in Scottish advertising of the fixture.

The Scottish League team was always at a disadvantage compared to the Scotland national team because many of the better Scottish players were contracted to English clubs. Despite this handicap, the Scottish League team performed quite well before the fixtures were stopped in 1915 due to the First World War. The league itself continued during the conflict, unlike others in the UK, and three end-of-season fundraising friendly matches were played between the select team and Celtic, the Scottish champions in each of the seasons. At the end of the war, the Scottish Football League was badly affected by the decline of heavy industry in the country, which meant that only the Old Firm clubs and Motherwell were able to retain a high standard of player. To improve the standard of the Scottish League team, two notable English-born players were selected, Bob Ferrier of Motherwell and J. B. McAlpine of Queen's Park as well as County Donegal-born Patsy Gallacher. Their birthplace meant that they were ineligible to play for the national team, but they were educated and played all of their senior football in Scotland. Despite these efforts, the Scottish League team suffered heavy defeats against the Football League in 1928 (6–2) and 1930 (7–3).

The Football League started to express concerns about the viability of the match, particularly because playing it on a Saturday meant that any cancelled league fixtures had to be played instead on midweek afternoons as floodlights were not yet in use. The match continued to be played because the fixtures in Scotland were well attended and therefore lucrative to both leagues. The higher attendances in Scotland reflected the greater interest in the fixture there. Some venues in England had good attendance though, particularly Newcastle. Matches against the Irish League XI were poorly attended. Even in the early years of the fixture, steps were taken to improve attendance, such as moving it around Scotland and picking local players. For example, the match in 1900 was played at Easter Road and each of the four senior Edinburgh clubs were represented.

Just before the outbreak of the Second World War in 1939, the Scottish League played its first match against the League of Ireland XI. The clubs in the then Irish Free State had formed their own League of Ireland after the partition of Ireland in 1922. The League of Ireland XI surprisingly won 2–1 against a strong Scottish League XI. Only one inter-league match (a fundraiser for the Royal Air Force) was played during the Second World War, a 3–2 defeat against the Football League at Blackpool in October 1941. The Scottish League XI selected Matt Busby, who was then playing as a guest for Hibernian.

=== Post-1945 ===
Attendances for the inter-league matches greatly increased after the war. The first match, a 3–1 defeat to a Football League XI inspired by Stanley Matthews and Wilf Mannion, attracted 84,000 to Hampden Park on a snowy day in March 1947. Even the less attractive fixture against the Irish League XI drew a crowd of 62,000 to Ibrox Park in 1949. A frequent problem for the selectors was judging the strength of opposition and the importance of the match. An example of this was when the Scottish League XI played a Welsh League XI at Cardiff in September 1952, although the term "Welsh League" was inaccurate as their players were selected from the Welsh clubs playing in the Football League. The Scottish League picked only a few players of genuine international quality and lost 3–0, with Ivor Allchurch scoring twice for the Welsh side.

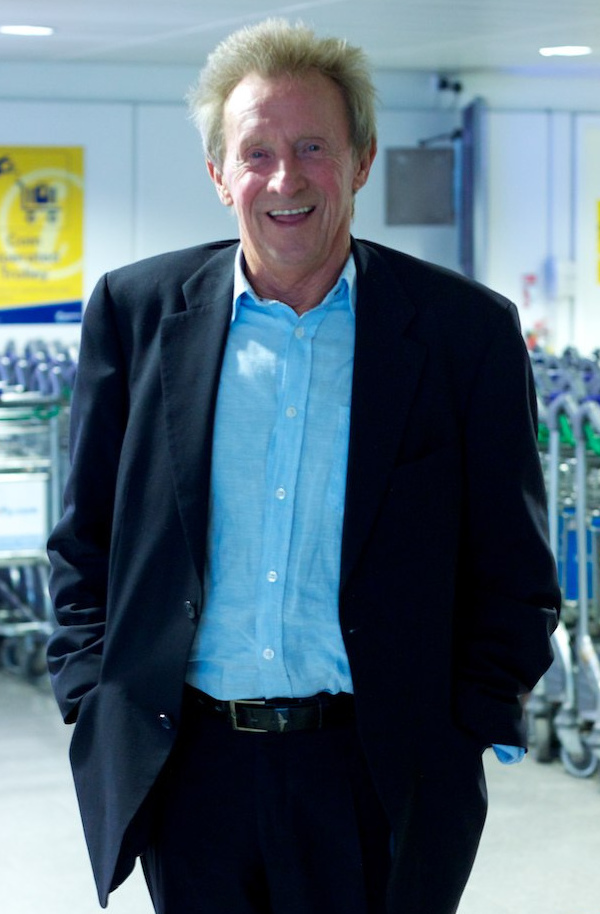
Denis Law, the all-time top goalscorer for the Scottish national team, played against the Scottish League XI for the Italian league in November 1961.

The Scottish League XI played opposition from outside the British Isles for the first time in 1955, when a Danish Combination was beaten 4–0 in Copenhagen. The South African player Johnny Hubbard scored one of the goals. Perhaps the best result achieved by the Scottish League XI was in November 1961, when an Italian league team containing John Charles and Denis Law was held to a 1–1 draw at Hampden, watched by 67,000 fans. A return match was played in Rome a year later. The Scots lost 4–3, but forwards Willie Hamilton and Charlie Cooke made a significant impression.

These kinds of contests were needed to revive interest in the inter-league matches, but they had come too late. Fixture congestion, caused by increased domestic and European commitments, meant that it was very difficult to arrange dates when strong teams could be assembled. Paradoxically, over the next fifteen years the approach to inter-league matches became more professional. Scottish League XI matches were seen as preparation for World Cup and European Nations Cup games. John White was an example of a player who quickly became a Scotland international player after impressing in one of the trial matches between the Scottish League XI and a Scotland national team – after moving to England, he was one of several who 'switched sides' and played for the SFA team against the SFL in a subsequent trial. The Scotland national team manager of the day would also manage the Scottish League XI.

Despite this new-found professionalism and notable wins against the Football League in 1962 and 1966, the inter-league matches were declining in importance. Players who had been selected were often withdrawn if their club team had other commitments. Games against the Irish leagues sometimes resulted in embarrassing mismatches, such as an 11–0 win against a League of Ireland XI in 1962. This affected the level of interest amongst fans, and only 5,000 attended a match against the Irish League XI at Ibrox in 1969.

Any remaining credibility of the inter-league matches was finally destroyed by a 5–0 defeat against the Football League at Maine Road in 1974. The Scottish League team only contained a few players who had any realistic hope of playing regularly for the Scotland national team, while the Football League had picked a strong side. Two years later, less than 10,000 fans attended a low-key return match at Hampden and the fixture was put into abeyance. The Scottish League XI played out a creditable 1–1 draw in 1978 against an Italian league team in Verona, as preparation for the 1978 FIFA World Cup. Games were played against both Irish leagues in 1980, but no inter-league matches have been played by the Scottish League since then.

A Scottish League team last played in 1990, to mark the league's centenary, in a match against the Scotland national team. The manager of the Scottish League team was Dundee United manager Jim McLean. The Scottish League select won 1–0, with the only goal scored from a penalty kick by Dutch player Hans Gillhaus.

== Players ==
Bobby Evans holds the record for Scottish League XI appearances, having played 25 times between 1948 and 1960. George Young attained 22 caps, and is the only other player to have won at least 20. Seventeen other players achieved at least 10 caps. Willie Bauld scored the most goals for the Scottish League XI, with his 15 goals coming in 13 appearances between 1949 and 1958. Lawrie Reilly scored 14 goals in as many games. As well as being the third highest scorer, Barney Battles, Jr. is also the most prolific, with his 13 goals coming from only five games (averaging 2.6 goals per game). Bobby Collins (12) and William Reid (10) also scored at least 10 goals for the team.

== Managers ==
As of 00:25, 13 November 2023 (UTC)

=== Record by team manager ===
Against other league selects

Years	Manager	P	W	D	L	%W	%D	%L	Ref
1965	Jock Stein	1	1	0	0	100	0	0	
1966	Malky MacDonald	1	1	0	0	100	0	0	
1966	John Prentice	1	1	0	0	100	0	0	
1967–71	Bobby Brown	7	2	1	4	28.57	14.29	57.14	
1972	Tommy Docherty	1	0	0	1	0	0	100	
1973–76	Willie Ormond	4	1	1	2	25	25	50	
1978–80	Jock Stein	3	0	1	2	0	33.33	66.67	

Against other opponents

Years	Manager	P	W	D	L	%W	%D	%L	Ref
1978	Ally McLeod	1	0	1	0	0	100	0	
1990	Jim McLean	1	1	0	0	100	0	0	

== Stadium ==
Unlike the Scotland national team, the Scottish League XI had no traditional home ground. Matches were moved around various club grounds. The high-profile matches against the Football League and the Italian league were always played in one of the three main stadiums in Glasgow: Hampden Park, Ibrox Park or Celtic Park. Until the fixture declined in importance in the late 1960s, matches against the Football League would regularly attract crowds in excess of 40,000, peaking at 90,000 in 1949. The less attractive matches, against the Irish League XI or the League of Ireland XI, were spread around Scotland more evenly. Grounds in Dundee (Carolina Port and Dens Park), Edinburgh (Easter Road and Tynecastle), Paisley (Love Street) and Motherwell (Fir Park) were used in addition to Glasgow. Smaller stadiums were also used in Glasgow itself, namely Firhill and Shawfield.

== Results ==
The largest margin of victory achieved by a Scottish League XI is 11–0, against the League of Ireland XI in 1962. The record defeat occurred in 1974, a 5–0 deficit against the Football League. Both matches helped to precipitate the end of inter-league matches.

=== Results by opponent ===
==== Against other league selects ====
As of 00:25, 13 November 2011 (UTC)

Opponent	P	W	D	L	%W	%D	%L
Denmark League XI	1	1	0	0	100	0	0
(England) The Football League XI (Note: This total includes two 'Victory Inter-league matches' in early 1919, and one match during World War II in 1941 in which Scotland was officially playing as the Southern Football League (Scotland). Regular league football was suspended in England from 1915 to 1919 and from 1939 to 1946 (Division One in Scotland continued during WWI, but shut down in WWII).)	75	19	14	42	25.33	18.67	56
(Scotland) Highland League XI	1	1	0	0	100	0	0
(Ireland) (Northern Ireland) Irish League XI	62	56	1	5	90.32	1.61	8.06
(Italy) Serie A XI (Note: This total includes a match against Italy B in 1978.)	3	0	2	1	0	66.67	33.33
(Republic of Ireland) League of Ireland XI	22	17	3	2	77.27	13.64	9.09
(Scotland) Scottish Alliance XI	1	1	0	0	100	0	0
(Scotland) Division Two XI	1	1	0	0	100	0	0
(England) Southern League XI	5	2	1	2	40	20	40
(Wales) Welsh League XI	1	0	0	1	0	0	100
Totals	172	98	21	53	56.98	12.21	30.81

==== Against other opponents ====
Opponent	P	W	D	L	%W	%D	%L
Scotland (SFA)	7	2	2	3	28.57	28.57	42.86
(Scotland) Celtic FC	3	2	0	1	66.67	0	33.33
(United Kingdom) Military XI	1	0	0	1	0	0	100
(England) Sunderland AFC	1	1	0	0	100	0	0
(England) Leicester City FC	1	0	0	1	0	0	100
(Scotland) Cambuslang FC	1	1	0	0	100	0	0
(Scotland) Falkirk FC	1	1	0	0	100	0	0
Totals	15	8	2	5	46.67	13.33	33.33

P - Played; W - Won; D - Drawn; L - Lost
