= Harry Chippendale =

English footballer (1870–1952)

Personal information
- Date of birth: 2 October 1870
- Place of birth: Blackburn, England
- Date of death: 29 September 1952 (aged 81)
- Position: Outside right

Senior career*
Years	Team	Apps	(Gls)
1889–1890	Accrington	0	(0)
1890–1891	Nelson		
1891–1897	Blackburn Rovers	134	(50)

International career
1894	England	1	(0)
- * Club domestic league appearances and goals

Harry Chippendale (2 October 1870 – 29 September 1952) was an English international footballer, who played as an outside right.

== Career ==
Born in Blackburn, Chippendale started his career with Accrington but did not make a senior appearance for the club. After leaving Accrington, he had a spell with Nelson. Between 1891 and 1897 Chippendale played professionally for Blackburn Rovers, and earned one cap for England in 1894.
