= Jack Hendry (footballer, born 1867) =

Scottish footballer

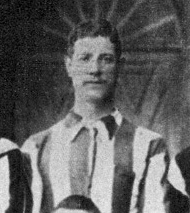

Personal information
- Full name: John Hendry
- Date of birth: 1867
- Place of birth: Glasgow, Scotland
- Date of death: 1917 (aged 49–50)
- Place of death: Nottingham, England
- Position: Full back

Senior career*
Years	Team	Apps	(Gls)
- Rangers
1890–1896	Notts County	163	(1)
- Heanor Town
- * Club domestic league appearances and goals

John Hendry (1867 – 1917) was a Scottish footballer who played in the Football League for Notts County. Jack Hendry was responsible for the handball foul in the February 1891 FA Cup quarter final that is credited for changing opinion in English soccer about the legitimacy of penalty kicks. Hendry had denied Stoke an equaliser With only seconds of the game remaining by handling the ball on the goal-line. The resulting free-kick was lost denying Stoke chance of a place in the semi-final while Notts proceeded as far as the 1891 FA Cup Final.
