= Harry Gardiner (footballer) =

Scottish footballer

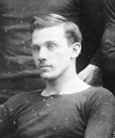

Personal information
- Date of birth: 1868
- Place of birth: Kilmarnock, Scotland
- Date of death: 1922 (aged 53–54)
- Position: Defender

Senior career*
Years	Team	Apps	(Gls)
1888–1890	Renton	5	(0)
1890–1894	Bolton Wanderers	80	(5)
1894–1895	Rangers	2	(0)

International career
1892	Football League XI	1	(0)
- * Club domestic league appearances and goals

Henry Gardiner (1868 – 1922) was a Scottish footballer who played in the Football League for Bolton Wanderers.
