= Handel Bentley =

English footballer (1871–1945)

Personal information
- Full name: Handel Bentley
- Date of birth: 19 March 1872
- Place of birth: Edgworth, England
- Date of death: 1945 (aged 73–74)
- Position: Winger

Senior career*
Years	Team	Apps	(Gls)
1891–1895	Bolton Wanderers	44	(17)
Total		44	(17)
- * Club domestic league appearances and goals

Handel Bentley (14 November 1871 – 1945) was an English footballer who played in the Football League for Bolton Wanderers.
