= James Logan (footballer, born 1870) =

Scottish footballer (1870–1896)

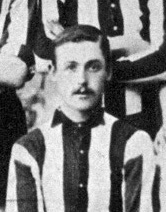
Logan in 1894

James Logan (24 June 1870 – 25 May 1896) was a Scottish professional footballer who played as a forward. He scored a hat-trick in the 1894 FA Cup Final for Notts County in a 4–1 victory over Bolton Wanderers.

== Playing career ==
Jimmy Logan started his career at Ayr. On 21 March 1891, he scored on his full Scotland debut, finishing on the winning team in a 4–3 victory over Wales. He came to the attention of Sunderland that day and in 1891 signed for them, making two appearances as the club won the 1891–92 Football League championship.

Logan briefly returned to Ayr, before signing for Aston Villa in October 1892 for a transfer fee of £30. He played ten times for them in the 1892–93 season, scoring on seven occasions, and followed that up with one goal in four games before Notts County signed him. At this point Notts County were a Second Division club, but this only helped Logan as he went on to score 21 goals in 21 games, guiding the club to their second FA Cup Final. they eliminated three clubs from the First Division to reach the final where they beat Bolton Wanderers 4–1, Logan scoring a hat-trick to seal the victory.

Logan moved on to play two games for Dundee and later joined Newcastle United, scoring eight goals in the nine games, before transferring to Loughborough. It was here than his career and life ended: on their way to play Newton Heath, Loughborough discovered that their kit had been lost. Unable to borrow any shirts, they had to take to the field wearing their ordinary clothes. Rain fell heavily throughout the 90 minutes, and at the end of a 2–0 defeat, Loughborough's players had to return home still wearing the same clothes. Logan caught a cold which he managed to shake off, but not long after scoring in a 4–1 victory in the final game of the season against Crewe Alexandra, he relapsed, developed pneumonia and died, aged 25.

He was buried in an unmarked pauper's grave in Loughborough cemetery; in 2016, his resting place was marked by a headstone following a campaign by Notts County supporters.

== Honours ==
Notts County

- FA Cup: 1894
