= Arthur Watson (footballer, died 1937) =

English footballer

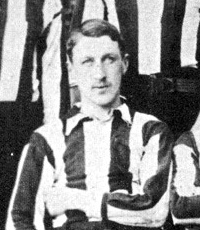

Personal information
- Full name: Arthur Edwin Cooke Watson
- Date of birth: 1870
- Place of birth: Hucknall Torkard, England
- Date of death: 1937 (aged 66–67)
- Position: Winger

Senior career*
Years	Team	Apps	(Gls)
1890–1891	University College		
1891–1892	Mansfield Greenhalgh's		
1892–1893	Mansfield Town		
1893–1895	Notts County	22	(13)
1895	Mansfield Town		
Total		46	(0)
- * Club domestic league appearances and goals

Arthur Edwin Cooke Watson (1870–1937) was an English footballer who played in the Football League for Notts County, with whom he was on the winning side in the 1894 FA Cup Final.
