= Charlie Bramley =

English footballer

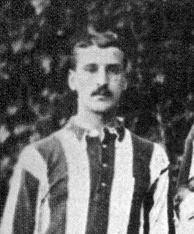

Personal information
- Date of birth: 1870
- Place of birth: Nottingham, England
- Date of death: September 1916 (aged 45–46)
- Position: Wing half

Senior career*
Years	Team	Apps	(Gls)
- Notts Rangers
1891–1898	Notts County	126	(8)
- * Club domestic league appearances and goals

Charles Bramley (1870 – September 1916) was an English footballer who played in the Football League for Notts County.
