= Daniel Bruce (footballer, born 1868) =

Scottish footballer

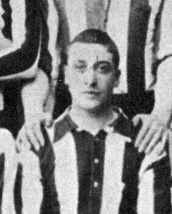

Personal information
- Full name: Daniel Rodger Bruce
- Date of birth: 21 March 1868
- Place of birth: Bonhill, Scotland
- Date of death: 6 February 1931 (aged 62)
- Place of death: Dumbarton, Scotland
- Position: Forward

Senior career*
Years	Team	Apps	(Gls)
1888–1891	Vale of Leven	36	(13)
1891–1892	Rangers	4	(5)
1892–1895	Notts County	89	(47)
1895–1896	Small Heath	9	(2)
1896–1897	Perth		
1897	Vale of Leven		
1897–1898	St Mirren	1	(0)

International career
1890	Scotland	1	(0)
- * Club domestic league appearances and goals

Daniel Rodger Bruce (21 March 1868 – 4 February 1931) was a Scotland international footballer who played on the losing side in the 1890 Scottish Cup final for Vale of Leven and on the winning side in the 1894 FA Cup final for Notts County. He scored 49 goals in 98 appearances in the Football League playing for Notts County and Small Heath. He played as a left-sided or centre forward.

== Career ==
Bruce was born in Bonhill, Dunbartonshire. He played for Vale of Leven, with whom he appeared in the 1890 Scottish Cup final against Queen's Park. The final as scheduled finished as a 1–1 draw; in the replay, Bruce opened the scoring for Vale of Leven but Queen's came back to win 2–1. Soon afterwards Bruce was capped for Scotland on 22 March 1890 against Wales in the British Home Championship; Scotland won 5–0 in what turned out to be only international appearance. He moved to Rangers in 1891 and played four games in the Scottish Football League at the start of the 1892–93 season, scoring five goals.

Bruce came to England later that year to join Football League First Division club Notts County. Though relegated at the end of his first season, and failing to win promotion the next despite Bruce's 18-goal contribution, they did become the first Second Division club to win the FA Cup. County beat four First Division sides to reach the 1894 FA Cup final; Bruce scored once in the quarter-final, "scraping" a draw against local rivals Nottingham Forest, and twice more in the 4–1 replay win. Bruce had several chances to open the scoring in the final, but was foiled both by the Bolton Wanderers goalkeeper and by the woodwork; nevertheless, County went on to win 4–1. In three years with the club, Bruce played 89 league games and scored at better than a goal every two games.

In November 1895, Bruce moved to First Division Small Heath. The transfer fee of £100 made him the first player for whom Small Heath had paid a three-figure fee, but he failed to settle. He scored twice in the ten games he played for the club before he returned to Scotland, turning out for Perth and Vale of Leven before signing for St Mirren.

Bruce died in 1931 at the age of 62.

== Personal life ==
His younger brother Walter was also a footballer who also played for Vale of Leven and St Mirren, spending most of his career with the latter.

== Honours ==
Vale of Leven

- Scottish Cup runners-up: 1890

Notts County

- FA Cup winners: 1894
