= George Toone (footballer, born 1868) =

English footballer

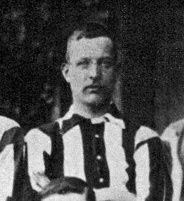
- Toone with Notts County in 1894.

Personal information
- Date of birth: 10 June 1868
- Place of birth: Nottingham, England
- Date of death: 1 September 1943 (aged 75)
- Height: 5 ft 8 in (1.73 m)
- Position: Goalkeeper

Senior career*
Years	Team	Apps	(Gls)
1889–1899	Notts County	262	(0)
1899–1900	Bedminster	30	(0)
1900–1901	Bristol City	30	(0)
1901–1902	Notts County		(0)
Total		325	(0)

International career
1892	England	2	(0)
- * Club domestic league appearances and goals

George Toone (10 June 1868 – 1 September 1943) was an English international footballer, who played as a goalkeeper. His son, also called George also played professional football.

== Career ==
Born in Nottingham, Toone played professionally for Notts County, Bedminster and Bristol City. He earned two international caps for England in 1892.
