= Charles James Hughes (footballer) =

English footballer and referee

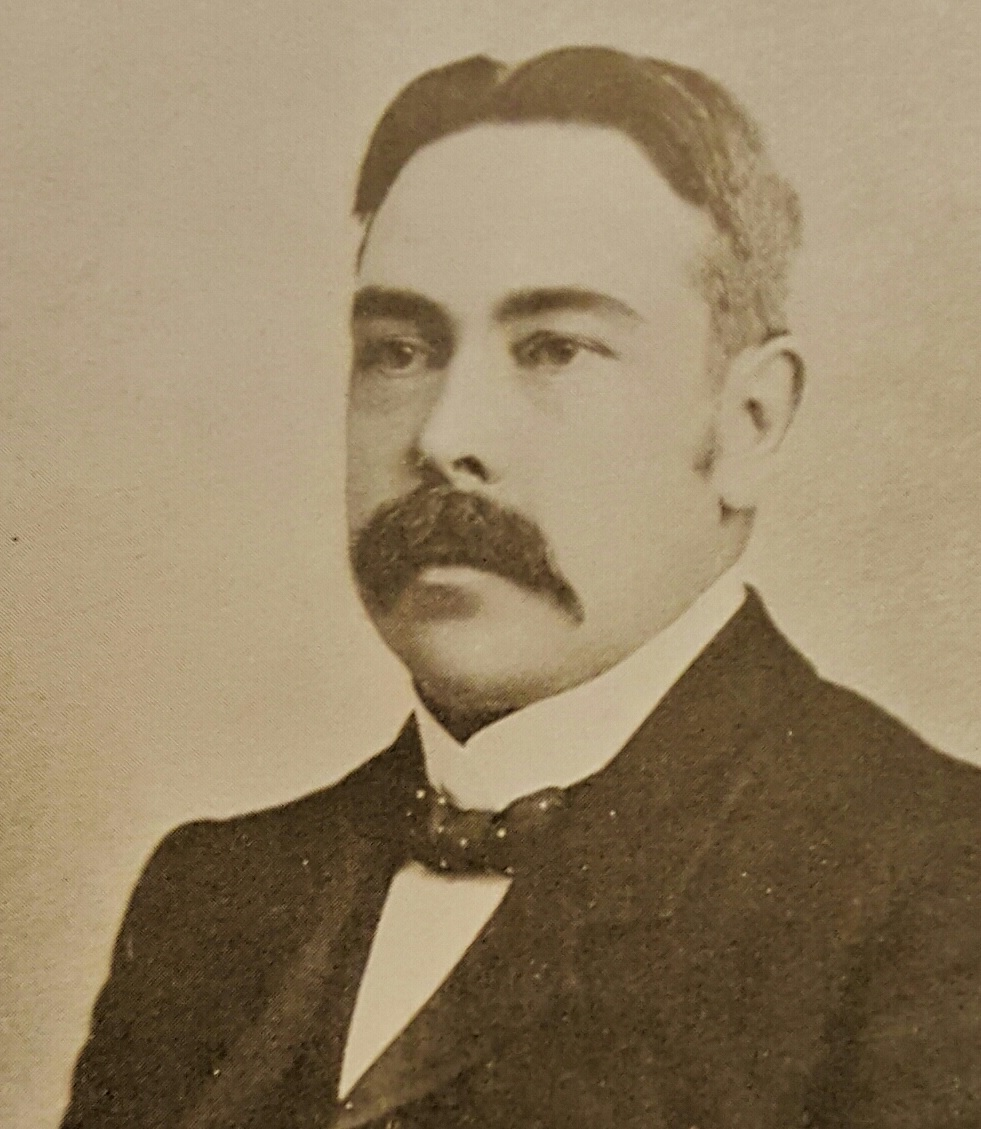

Personal information
- Full name: Charles James Hughes
- Date of birth: 16 August 1853
- Place of birth: Northwich, Cheshire, England
- Date of death: 31 July 1916 (aged 62)
- Place of death: Northwich, Cheshire, England

Senior career*
Years	Team	Apps	(Gls)
1874–1877	Northwich Victoria		
- * Club domestic league appearances and goals

Charles James Hughes, J.P. (16 August 1853 – 31 July 1916) was an English footballer, referee, and co-founder of Northwich Victoria Football Club. He was a pioneer of the early English game, being included in the publication 'Association Football and the Men who made it'.

== Early life ==
Hughes was born at 7 Applemarket Street in Northwich, Cheshire, to James Charles Hughes, a plasterer and roof tiler, and Hannah, née Pemberton, a milliner. He was educated at Witton Grammar School (now Sir John Deane's College) and became an auctioneers' clerk aged 15, later founding his own business as Charles J. Hughes and Son. Soon after this he rose to prominence in his home town as a member of the Northwich and District Urban Council and honourable auditor for several local infirmaries. He was also a governor for Witton Grammar School.

== Local work ==
Hughes played a huge role in the development of association football, both in his home town, county, and in England. As well as being the co-founder of Northwich Victoria Football Club, he was their honourable secretary, treasurer and a player.

He appeared in Northwich Victoria's first ever recorded Association Football game in 1874 against Stedman College in the village of Comberbach, Cheshire. His playing career unfortunately ended when his ankle was broken by an opposition player on 15 November 1877, during a football match at the Drill Field, Northwich, against Hanley Rangers . He was a joint-founder of the Cheshire Football Association, and from its foundation in 1878 until 1908, he served as their honourable secretary. On his retirement from the Cheshire Football Association in 1908, his tenure of 30 years as the honourable secretary was a World record, and his service was commended by figures from across the country, including those representing the Football Association.

Aside from football, he was a figurehead in several other sport clubs in Northwich; cricket, rowing and athletics.

== The Football Association and legacy ==
Hughes was an important member of the FA during their first few decades. In the 1890s for example, he was referee of the 1891, 1893 and 1894 FA Cup finals, as well as various Football League and local matches. He also acted as linesman for International matches; in 1892 he was linesman for a match between England and Scotland at Ibrox. In 1901, Hughes served as the FA's vice president. In 1907 and 1908, he was often in charge of selecting the squad for the England national football team for international matches, making him the de facto manager.

Testament to his influence in Association Football, the former secretary of Northwich Victoria, the late Ken Edwards, who wrote the club's history in the book 'A Team for All Seasons', said that "few men have done more for the association game than Mr. C.J. Hughes."

Following his death on 31 July 1916, he was buried at St. Wilfrid's Church in the nearby village of Davenham.
