= Idols South Africa season 17 =

Idols South Africa
- Season 17
- Hosted by: ProVerb
- Judges: Randall Abrahams; Unathi Nkayi; Somizi Mhlongo
- Winner: Berry Trytsman
- Runner-up: Karabo Mathe
- No. of episodes: 20

Release
- Original network: Mzansi Magic
- Original release: 11 July – 21 November 2021

Season chronology
- ← Previous; Season 16 Next → Season 18

The seventeenth season of South African Idols premiered on 11 July 2021 and concluded on 21 November 2021 on the Mzansi Magic television network. The season was won by Berry Trytsman and the runner-up was Karabo Mathe.

The season saw judge Somizi Mhlongo being asked to "take time off" from the show to deal with domestic abuse allegations against him. This resulted in him only appearing in the first few pre-recorded episodes and none of the live ones. He was replaced by a guest judge each week for the rest of the season.

After 17 and 11 years as judges respectively, it was announced shortly before the start of the eighteenth season that Randall Abrahams and Unathi Nkayi would not be returning to the show.

== Finalists ==
Contestant	Age	Hometown	Place finished
Berry Trytsman	30	Cape Town, Western Cape	Winner
Karabo Mathe	21	Hebron, North West	Runner-up
S'22kile Langa	20	Pietermaritzburg, KwaZulu-Natal	3rd
Kevin Maduna	28	Soweto, Gauteng	4th
Daylin Sass	23	Hanover Park, Western Cape	5th
Nqobie Linda	28	Soweto, Gauteng	6th
Sia Mzizi	20	Tsakane, Gauteng	7th
Bulelani Twala	18	Heidelberg, Gauteng	8th
Monique Erens	25	Cape Town, Western Cape	9th
Ithana Conjwa	23	Cala, Eastern Cape	10th
Zukisa Mashiqa	16	Pietermaritzburg, KwaZulu-Natal	11th–13th
Siya Motloung	21	Katlehong, Gauteng	11th–13th
Misty Makhene	30	Vosloorus, Gauteng	11th–13th
Andiswa Zondi	18	Johannesburg, Gauteng	14th–16th
Sinovuyo Mbhele	20	Vosloorus, Gauteng	14th–16th
Tesmin-Robyn Khanye	23	Katlehong, Gauteng	14th–16th

== Weekly Song Choice and Result ==
=== Top 16: The Biggest Hits of Today ===
==== Group A (29 August) ====
Act	Order	Song	Result
Andiswa Zondi	1	"Midnight Sky" by Miley Cyrus	Eliminated
Bulelani Twala	2	"Attention" by Charlie Puth	Wild Card
Sinovuyo Mbhele	3	"Pick Up Your Feelings" by Jazmine Sullivan	Eliminated
Nqobie Linda	4	"Hard Place" by H.E.R	Safe
Sia Mzizi	5	"Heartbreak Anniversary" by Giveon	Safe
Tesmin-Robyn	6	"Before I Let Go" by Beyoncé	Eliminated
Daylin Sass	7	"Leave the Door Open" by Bruno Mars, Anderson .Paak & Silk Sonic	Safe
Berry Trytsman	8	"You Say" by Lauren Daigle	Safe

- Guest Judge: Lady Du

==== Group B (5 September) ====
Act	Order	Song	Result
Siya Motloung	1	"In Your Eyes" by The Weeknd	Eliminated
Zukisa Mashiqa	2	"Distance" by Yebba	Eliminated
Misty Makhene	3	"Dying 4 Your Love" by Snoh Aalegra	Eliminated
Karabo Mathe	4	"Stand Up for Something" by Andra Day	Safe
S’22kile Langa	5	"Meant to Be" by Bebe Rexha	Safe
Monique Erens	6	"I'll Never Love Again" by Lady Gaga	Safe
Ithana Conjwa	7	"Forgive Me" by Chloe x Halle	Wild Card
Kevin Maduna	8	"Peaches" by Justin Bieber	Safe

- Guest Judge: Buhle Mda

=== Top 10 (Top 9): Battle of the DJs (19 September) ===
This round saw contestants perform hit songs by five DJs: DJ Cleo, Prince Kaybee, Sun-El Musician, De Mthuda and DJ Sumbody.

Ithana Conjwa withdrew from the competition for health reasons a day before performing in the non-elimination round broadcast on 12 September. This meant that the top 10 round immediately became the top 9 round.

Act	Order	Song	Result
Bulelani Twala	1	"Iyamemeza" by DJ Sumbody feat. Drip Gogo & The Lowkeys	Safe
Monique Erens	2	"Charlotte" by Prince Kaybee feat. Lady Zamar	Eliminated
Daylin Sass	3	"Friend Zone" by Prince Kaybee feat. Ziyon	Safe
S’22kile Langa	4	"Wamuhle" by De Mthuda feat. Njelic & Boohle	Safe
Berry Trytsman	5	"Choose To Be Happy" by DJ Cleo feat. Mmatema	Safe
Kevin Maduna	6	"Piki Piki" by DJ Sumbody feat. Cassper Nyovest & Kaylow	Safe
Nqobie Linda	7	"Akanamali" by Sun-El Musician feat. Samthing Soweto	Safe
Sia Mzizi	8	"Emlanjeni" by De Mthuda & Sir Trill feat. Da Muziqal Chef	Safe
Karabo Mathe	9	"Gcina Impilo Yam" by DJ Cleo feat. Bucy Radebe	Safe
Ithana Conjwa	10	"Ubomi Abumanga" by Sun-El Musician feat. Msaki	Withdrew

=== Top 8 (26 September) ===
Act	Order	Song	Result
Karabo Mathe	1	"When I See U" by Fantasia	Safe
Nqobie Linda	2	"Uthando" by Soa Mattrix & Soulful G feat. Shaun 101	Safe
S’22kile Langa	3	"Xola Moya Wam" by Nomcebo Zikode feat. Master KG	Safe
Sia Mzizi	4	"Dream About You" by Loyiso Gijana	Safe
Daylin Sass	5	"Yummy" by Justin Bieber	Safe
Bulelani Twala	6	"Uyeke" by Heavy K feat. Natalia Mabaso	Eliminated
Berry Trytsman	7	"Blinding Lights" by The Weeknd	Safe
Kevin Maduna	8	"Case" by Teni	Safe

- Guest Judge: Dineo Ranaka

=== Top 7 ===
==== Top 7: Mzansi Greats (3 October) ====
Act	Order	Song	Result
Karabo Mathe	1	"Paradise Road" by Joy	Safe
Daylin Sass	2	"Take Your Love" by Steve Kekana	Safe
Berry Trytsman	3	"I'd Like" by Freshlyground	Safe
Kevin Maduna	4	"Nguwe" by Malaika	Safe
Sia Mzizi	5	"Sondela" by Ringo Madlingozi	Safe
S'22kile Langa	6	"No No No Senor" by Brenda Fassie	Safe
Nqobie Linda	7	"I Love Music" by Lebo Mathosa	Safe

- Guest Judge: Zahara

==== Top 7: Showstopper (11 October) ====
On 11 October, it was announced that there would be no elimination that week, and would resume the following week. All seven contestants went on to perform their prepared showstopper songs.

Act	Order	Song	Result
S'22kile Langa	1	"Dance for You" by Beyoncé	Safe
Sia Mzizi	2	"John Wick" by De Mthuda feat. Sir Trill & Da Muziqal Chef	Eliminated
Karabo Mathe	3	"Respect" by Aretha Franklin	Safe
Daylin Sass	4	"LaLaLa" by Black Coffee feat. Usher	Safe
Berry Trytsman	5	"Something's Got a Hold on Me" by Christina Aguilera	Safe
Nqobie Linda	6	"Dance like We're Making Love" by Ciara	Safe
Kevin Maduna	7	"We Dance Again" by Black Coffee feat. Nakhane Touré	Safe

- Guest Judge: Thembi Seete

=== Top 6: Oskido's Playlist & Max Martin's Songbook (17 October) ===
Act	Order	Song — Oskido's Playlist	Order	Song — Max Martin's Songbook	Result
Berry Trytsman	1	"Power" by Amanda Black	7	"Dark Horse" by Katy Perry	Safe
Kevin Maduna	2	"Ubomi Abumanga" by Sun-El Musician feat. Msaki	8	"It's My Life" by Bon Jovi	Safe
Nqobie Linda	3	"Feelings" by Zonke	9	"Please Don't Leave Me" by Pink	Eliminated
S'22kile Langa	4	"Ntyilo Ntyilo" by Rethabile Khumalo feat. Master KG	10	"Send My Love (To Your New Lover)" by Adele	Safe
Karabo Mathe	5	"Ngeke Balunge" by Mafikizolo	11	"Perfect" by Pink	Safe
Daylin Sass	6	"Something Inside So Strong" by Lira	12	"Pillowtalk by Zayn	Safe

- Guest Judge: Oskido

=== Top 5: Mzansi Gay Choir (24 October) ===
Act	Order	Song — Unplugged	Order	Song — LGBTQI+ Allies	Result
Karabo Mathe	1	"Thandwa Ndim" by Amanda Black	6	"River Deep – Mountain High" by Tina Turner	Safe
Daylin Sass	2	"Fairytale" by Liquideep	7	"Whataya Want from Me" by Adam Lambert	Eliminated
S’22kile Langa	3	"Easy to Love" by Bucie	8	"Love on the Brain" by Rihanna	Safe
Berry Trytsman	4	"Happy" by Craig Lucas	9	"The Edge of Glory" by Lady Gaga	Safe
Kevin Maduna	5	"Mnike" by Afrotraction	10	"As" by Stevie Wonder	Safe

- Guest Judge: Khaya Dladla

=== Top 4: Judges' Picks & SAMA Winners (31 October) ===
Act	Order	Song — Judges' Picks	Order	Song — SAMA Winners	Result
S’22kile Langa	1	"Diamonds" by Rihanna	5	"Sonini" by Sun-El Musician	Safe
Kevin Maduna	2	"Banyana" by DJ Maphorisa	6	"These Streets" by Mi Casa	Eliminated
Karabo Mathe	3	"And I Am Telling You I'm Not Going" by Jennifer Hudson	7	"Black President" by Brenda Fassie	Safe
Berry Trytsman	4	"No Tears Left to Cry" by Ariana Grande	8	"Hold Your Kite" by GoldFish and Sorana	Safe

- Guest Judge: Kelly Khumalo

=== Top 3: Gospel Duet (7 November) ===
Act	Order	Song — Duet with Gospel Artist	Order	Song	Order	Song	Result
Berry Trytsman	1	"Basuka" by Ayanda Ntanzi	4	"Unchained Melody" by The Righteous Brothers	7	"Easy on Me" by Adele	Safe
Karabo Mathe	2	"Hallelujah Mdumiseni" by Lebo Sekgobela	5	"Gold" by Beverley Knight	8	"Phakade Lami" by Nomfundo Moh, Sha Sha & Ami Faku	Safe
S'22kile Langa	3	"Mhlekazi" by Hlengiwe Mhlaba	6	"Mina Nawe" by Amanda Black	9	"Woman" by Doja Cat	Eliminated

- Guest Judge: Judith Sephuma
- Before his elimination, Kevin Maduna got a chance to perform his gospel duet song "Ukuhlala Kuye" with Dumi Mkokstad.

=== Top 2 (14 November) ===
Act	Order	Idols-produced Single	Order	Audition Song	Order	Favourite Previous Performance	Result
Karabo Mathe	1	"Hosanna" by Karabo Mathe	3	"Ndidinge" by Cici	5	"Respect" by Aretha Franklin	Runner-up
Berry Trytsman	2	"Ungowami" by Berry Trytsman	4	"Never Enough" from The Greatest Showman	6	"Something's Got a Hold on Me" by Christina Aguilera"	Winner

- Guest Judge: Msaki
- Before her elimination, S'22kile performed her single "Falling".

== Elimination Chart ==
Colour key

–	Winner
–	Runner-up
–	Eliminated
–	Wild Card
–	Withdrew

Weekly results per act
Act	Top 16		Top 10	Top 9	Top 8	Top 7 (first week)	Top 7 (second week)	Top 6	Top 5	Top 4	Top 3	Top 2
Act	Group A	Group B	Top 10	Top 9	Top 8	Top 7 (first week)	Top 7 (second week)	Top 6	Top 5	Top 4	Top 3	Top 2
Berry Trytsman	Safe	—N/a	Safe	Safe	Safe	Safe	Safe	Safe	Safe	Safe	Safe	Winner
Karabo Mathe	—N/a	Safe	Safe	Safe	Safe	Safe	Safe	Safe	Safe	Safe	Safe	Runner-up
S'22kile	—N/a	Safe	Safe	Safe	Safe	Safe	Safe	Safe	Safe	Safe	3rd place	Eliminated
Kevin Maduna	—N/a	Safe	Safe	Safe	Safe	Safe	Safe	Safe	Safe	4th place	Eliminated	
Daylin Sass	Safe	—N/a	Safe	Safe	Safe	Safe	Safe	Safe	5th place	Eliminated		
Nqobie Linda	Safe	—N/a	Safe	Safe	Safe	Safe	Safe	6th place	Eliminated			
Sia Mzizi	Safe	—N/a	Safe	Safe	Safe	Safe	7th place	Eliminated				
Bulelani Twala	Wild Card	—N/a	Safe	Safe	8th place	Eliminated						
Monique Erens	—N/a	Safe	Safe	9th place	Eliminated							
Ithana Conjwa	—N/a	Wild Card	10th place	Eliminated								
Zukisa Mashiqa	—N/a	11th/13th place	Eliminated									
Siya Motloung	—N/a	11th/13th place	Eliminated									
Misty Makhene	—N/a	11th/13th place	Eliminated									
Andiswa Zondi	14th/16th place	Eliminated										
Sinovuyo Mbhele	14th/16th place	Eliminated										
Tesmin-Robyn Khanye	14th/16th place	Eliminated										
