= Heavy-K =

South African DJ

- Also known as: Drum Boss; Khusta
- Born: Mkhululi Siqula; 4 December 1991 (age 34); Veeplaas, Gqeberha, South Africa
- Origin: Johannesburg
- Genres: Afro house; Afro tech
- Occupations: music producer; DJ
- Years active: 2010–present
- Label: Drumboss Musik

Mkhululi Siqula (born 4 December 1991) professionally known as Heavy-K, is a South African DJ and music producer. Born and raised in Veeplaas, Port Elizabeth, Siqula relocated to Johannesburg at the age of 21 to pursue his musical career.

== Early life ==
Mkhululi Siqula was born on December 4, 1991, Veeplaas, Port Elizabeth. His father, Phindlie Siqula, was working as a mechanic. Siqula attended Mzimhlophe Public primary school and Ndzondelelo Secondary School.

== Career ==
In 2007, he produced "Lento" Professor's single at the age of 16. In 2013, he moved to Johannesburg to pursue his career in music. His debut studio album Respect the Drumboss 2013 was released on January 1, 2013. In 2014, he produced Bucie's single "Easy to Love" which peaked number 9 on Entertainment Monitoring Africa.

In September 2015, his single "Umoya" featuring Professor and Mpumi was released. "Moya" was nominated for Best Collaboration and Best Dance Album for Respect the Drumboss 2015 at 15th Annual Metro FM Awards.

On December 2, 2016, his third studio album 1950 was released in South Africa. In August 2017, his single "Inde" featuring Bucie and Nokwazi was released. The song was certified 6× platinum.

In early 2018, his single "Sphum’ elokshini" featuring South African vocalist Mondli Ngcobo was released. On October 5, 2018, his fourth studio album Respect the Drumboss 2018 was released.

=== 2019-2021: Khusta, Respect the Drumboss 21(10 Years edition) ===
In July 2020, his single "Uyeke" featuring Natalia Mabaso was released. The song was certified platinum by the Recording Industry of South Africa with sales of 50 000 units. On July 31, 2020, his fifth studio album Khusta was released.

In November 2021, he announced his remix of Shivers in collaboration with Ed Sheeran, which was released on November 12.

Mkhululi was reportedly working on his sixth studio album by February 2021. On December 3, 2021, his sixth studio album Respect the Drumboss 21 (10 Years edition) was released. It features Just Bheki, Simmy, Aymos, Nkosazana Daughter, Natalia Mabaso, Intaba Yase Dubai, Sino Msolo, Boohle, MSK, Bassie, Ntunja, Drumetic Boyz, and MalumNator.

=== 2022-present: The Underrated King, Respect the Drum boss (3-Step Edition) ===
In early November 2022, he announced working on his The Underrated King EP and released its lead single "Ama Miliyoni" featuring Meez and Professor on November 18, 2022.

In 2023, Heavy-K released the album Respect The Drumboss 2 (3-Step Edition). 3-Step, a variant of gqom, is distinguished by its distinct rhythmic structure, which revolves around the sound of three kicks.

Heavy-K and DJ Tira released "Inkululeko", featuring Zee Nxumalo, Makhadzi, and Afro Brotherz on March 1, 2024.

== Personal life ==
In 2014, Siqula met Ntombi in a club at Grahamstown. The two got married and had two children together. In 2019, the couple got a divorce.

== Discography ==
=== Studio albums ===
- Respect The Drumboss 2013 (2013)
- Respect The Drumboss 2015 (2015)
- 1950 (2016)
- Respect The Drumboss 2018 (2018)
- Khusta (2020)
- Respect The Drumboss 2021 (10 Years Edition) (2021)
- Respect The Drumboss (3-Step Edition) (2023)
- The Anointed (2024)

=== Extended plays ===
- Thandaza (with Mbomi) (2021)
- The Underrated King (2022)

=== As lead artist ===
List of singles as lead artist, with selected chart positions and certifications, showing year released and album name
Title	Year	Peak chart positions	Certifications	Album
Title	Year	ZA	Certifications	Album
"Andikayeki" (Heavy-K, Ami Faku)	2023	—		Respect the Drum boss (3-Step Edition)
"Kwelizayo" (featuring Thakzin, Mazet)	2023	—		Respect the Drum boss (3-Step Edition)
"Ulele" (featuring Samthing Soweto)	2023	7	Platinum	Respect the Drum boss (3-Step Edition)
"Inkululeko" (DJ Tira, Heavy-K featuring Zee Nxumalo, Makhadzi, Afro Brotherz)	2024	—		Non-album single
"Kwenzakalani" (Heavy K, Sir Trill, Leemckrazy featuring Professor, Essa Kay)	2024	—		Non-album single
"Kunini Ngizama" (Heavy-K, Sir Trill featuring ilovelethu)	2024	—		Non-album single
"Washa Wena" (Heavy-K featuring Mark Khoza, Sir Trill, Professor, Mpho.Wav, Skhokho)	2024	—		Non-album single
"Nawe" (ilovelethu, Heavy-K, Sir Trill featuring Matics N)	2024	—		Non-album single
"Hamba Nathi" (Heavy-K, iLovelethu, featuring Don De Guitarist, Jey Charles)	2024	—		Non-album single
"—" denotes a recording that did not chart or was not released in that territory.
