= Afro house =

Subgenre of house music from South Africa

- Stylistic origins: Kwaito; house; mbaqanga; deep house; tribal house; soulful house
- Cultural origins: 1980s, South Africa
- Typical instruments: Vocals; saxophone; piano; drum kit; synthesizer; flute; sequencer
- Derivative forms: Gqom

Subgenres
- Afro tech

Other topics
- Afro pop; Afro fusion; amapiano

Afro house (also known as Afro-house or Afrohouse) is a sub-genre of house music mainly developed in South Africa. The genre emerged in the 1990s. This musical style fuses elements of traditional house with South African rhythms and sounds, incorporating instruments such as the saxophone, piano and synthesizers, as well as vocals in various African languages.

== Characteristics and etymology ==
Afro house may have emerged after or at the same time as Kwaito started to appear in South Africa. The music genre is principally a blend of traditional house, kwaito, mbaqanga, deep house, tribal house, and soulful house. It can feature the various South African languages within the music. The BPM commonly shifts between 80 and 122 and, in some instances, can even reach 160 BPM.

The etymology of the name uses the prefix 'afro' (meaning anything relating to Africa and African culture) and the suffix, 'house', referring to the main genre of house music.

== Notable women in Afro house ==
South African record label Afrotainment (Ezase Afro) housed one of the first notable female Afro house artists, DJ Cndo, in the early 2000s. Her 2007 debut album, Finest Lady of House Vol.1, obtained gold record status.

Vocalist Bucie is regarded as "the female voice of South African house music", including Afro house, particularly with regard her Afro house hit single "Superman" which was produced by Black Coffee in 2009 and was later sampled by Drake in 2017 for his More Life album featuring Jorja Smith. British singer Seal has stated that he likes her music and mentioned that Bucie is "a great singer and artist".

In 2012, DJ Zinhle, who released the hit song "My Name Is" featuring Busiswa, co-founded Fuse Academy, a DJ academy specifically for female DJs, together with Nomdeni Mdaki.

In 2016, singer Alicia Keys enlisted Black Coffee to create a remix of her track "In Common", which was recognized and well received internationally. Zimbabwean singer and songwriter Jackie Queens launched her record label Bae Electronica, which solely showcases female house artists such as Thandi Draai, who has been "heralded as SA house music's femmetastic triple-threat" according to Mixmag.

== History ==
Ostensibly before it was 'officially' named and categorized as a sub-genre, it was just referred to as simply, "house".

The genre appeared to have been, in some cases unintentionally labeled and mistaken as UK funky or afrobeats.

Foreseeably, many former kwaito and kwaito-correlating artists for instance Oskido, DJ Tira, Mafikizolo, Black Coffee, DJ Cleo, Thandiswa Mazwai, Big Nuz and Mahoota (member of Trompies) have been ceaselessly associated with the genre for decades.

Other ceasless artists include Osunlade, Louie Vega, Pablo Fierro, Darque, Am Roots, Djeff Afrozila, Jazzuelle, Hyenah, Rancido, Floyd Lavine, Boddhi Satva and Keinemusik Crue(Kloud).

It was broadly internationally spearheaded by Malaika, Black Coffee, DJ TekniQ DJ Fresh, DJ Tira, Zakes Bantwini, DJ Cndo, Da Capo, Bucie, Culoe De Song, Shimza, Punk Mbedzi, Enoo Napa and Black Motion.

=== 1980s ===
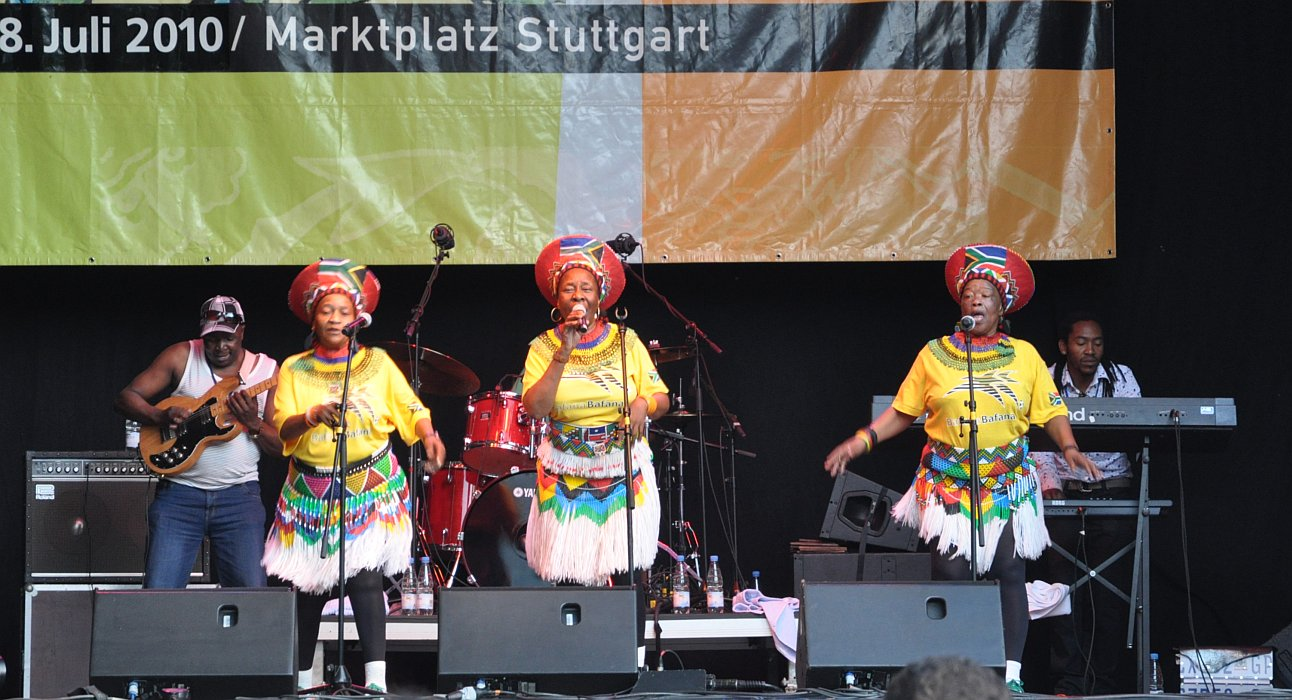
Mahotella Queens, South African female mbaqanga band formed in 1964 performing in Germany in 2010.

The genre is thought to have possibly been, in effect created in the late 1980s due to the hitherto heavy, presence of kwaito, mbaqanga and house both locally as well as internationally. This time period was unfortunately during the apartheid regime whereas information would evidently have not been easy to record nor share. Kwaito-associated acts such as Brenda Fassie and Sipho Mabuse were high-charting artists on global charts such as on KISS-FM and Capitol Radio during the 1980s and 1990s.This would outwardly be the world's first introduction to "South African house music". Artists such as Vinny Da Vinci, DJ Christos and Revolution twins were hosting parties and DJing in various locations.

I was working in townships before [Apartheid ended], and I'd get a lot of shit if I was caught. I mean, even name-wise I was never Christos. I changed my name like five times to avoid the cops.

— DJ Christos, DJ Mag

=== 1990s ===
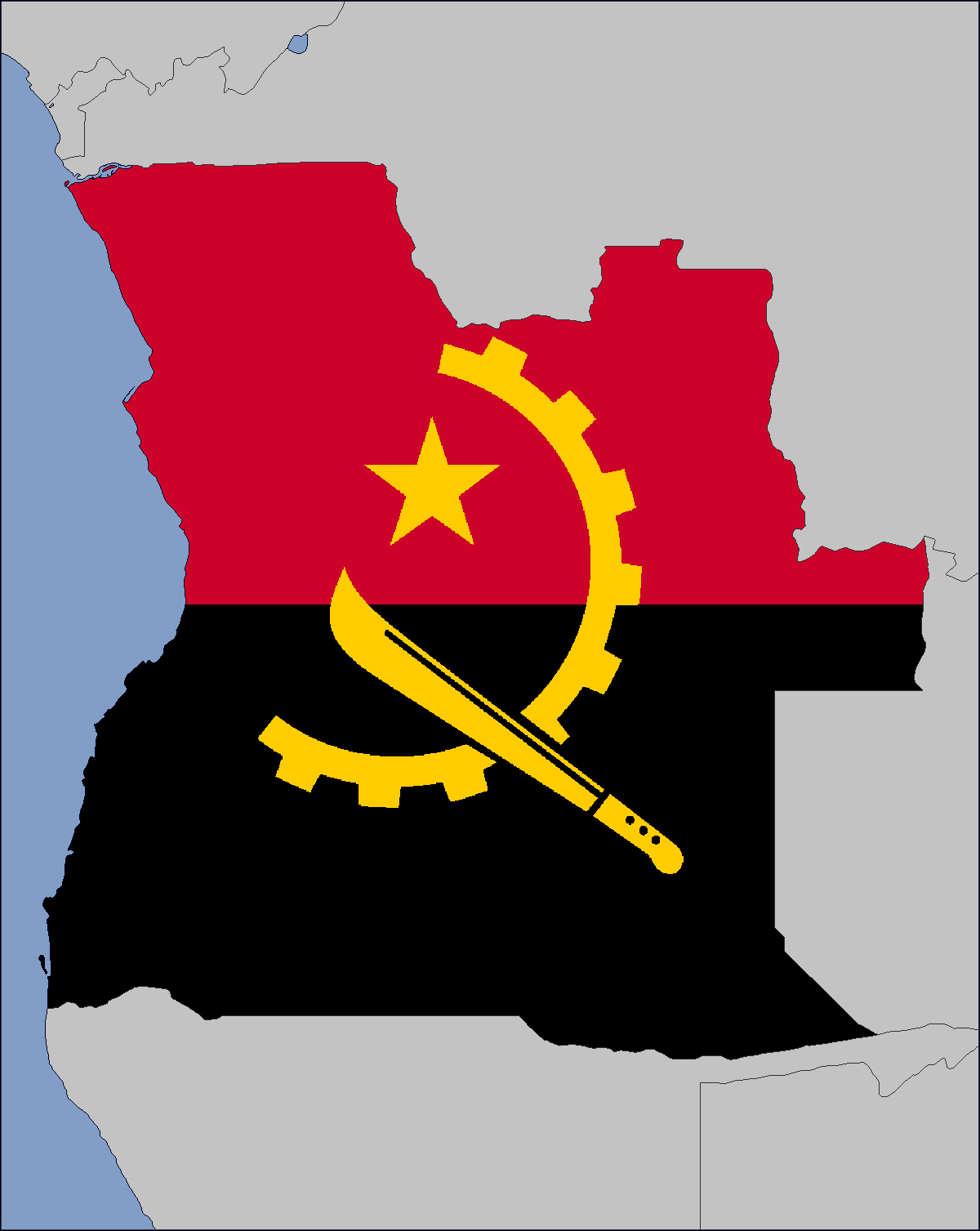
Angola

During this period the genre's universality in various locations such as the United States was set in stone. American artists such as Grammy-award-winning, Louie Vega had been regularly frequenting South Africa during this time. There is also evidence of the genre having been popularized in Angola due to the local dance culture. This is partially attributed to the musical genre kuduro.

In 1994, the South African record label House Afrika was established. The label was founded by Vinny Da Vinci (Vincent Motshegoa), Tim White and DJ Strat3gy(Glen van Loggerenberg). The label's debut album release was titled Fresh House Flava Vol.1 by DJ Fresh.

Some had friends at airlines and would ask them to bring tracks back in their luggage. Others would pay people to be couriers and get tunes into the country. Whether you call this bootlegging, or contraband, you made the most of any way you could get at the music.

— Vinny Da Vinci, DJ Mag

In the 1990s, house music gained significance during this time in urban centers like Johannesburg, Pretoria, and Durban, but it is Soweto where the music genre Kwaito emerged. Kwaito slowed down the tempo from Chicago house music and infused it with elements of reggae, hip-hop, and local vernacular that reflected the feelings of urban/township South African youth. Artists like DJ Oskido exemplified the genre, along with artists and musical groups like Boom Shaka, Mandla Mofokeng, and Bongo Maffin. At the same time, Kwaito went beyond the sound and was deeply tied to the shifting political landscape. As the apartheid system began to collapse, Kwaito became a soundtrack for a new generation asserting its identity and freedom. It was the sound played as public gatherings that eschewed the apartheid laws banning public gatherings and enforcing curfews. The young generation saw house music during this time as a form of resistance and a new mode of expression that rejected the imposed silence and claimed space for black South African youth.

“The younger generation at that time, we started creating our own music, which we called Kwaito. We used to take house music, slow it down and from there, we reprogrammed the music.” — DJ Oskido

=== 2000s ===
In 2001, House Afrika released "Oskido's Church Grooves".

In 2003, Malaika's "Destiny" topped, charts. The South African trio toured Australia alongside Zimbabwean, singer Tarisai Vushe who made it to the Top.5 of Australia Idol, 2007 as their supporting act.

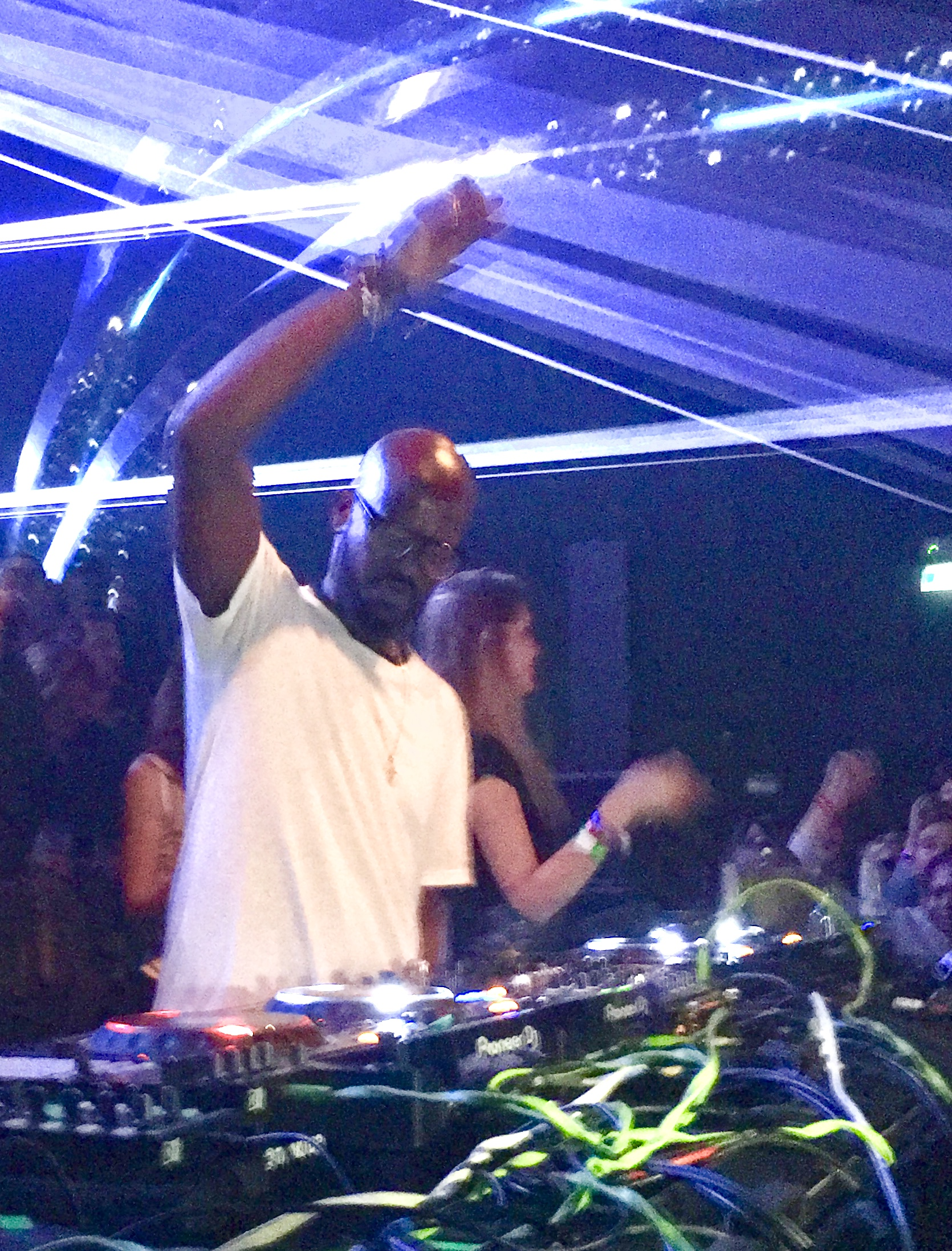
Black Coffee is a music producer and DJ who performs solely with his right hand due to a brachial plexus, injury resulting in paralysis of his left hand.

In 2005, South African Grammy-award-winning artist, Black Coffee released his debut self-titled album Black Coffee.The album appeared to be the first afro house album to win the South African Music Awards, Best Dance Album, category and featured other distinguished South African artists such as Hugh Masekela and Thandiswa Mazwai.

The genre had subsequently become popularized in even more parts of the world including South America, Europe, and Asia. In, London although already conceivably, presumbably present since the 1980s, its emergence appeared to have become solidified during this period as well as to a greater extent accredited to "giving rise to" the, UK funky, scene.

According to an interview American DJ, Osunlade had visited South Africa, for the first time in 2005.

DJ Cleo, released his first hit-single,"Goodbye".

In 2007, DJ Sbu's "Remember When It Rained" won Best Song of the Year, at the South African Music Awards.

"Umlilo" released by Big Nuz featuring DJ Tira and DJ Fisherman in 2009, won three South African Music Awards.

Culoe De Song, released his debut album A Giant Leap. It won Best New Artist at the South African Music Awards. The album was inclusive of one of his most popular releases "Webaba".

Between the 2000s and 2010s the genre appeared to have been most prominent in its native region, South Africa as well as the UK.

=== 2010s ===
Between the early 2010s and 2020s there was a surge in the number of Afro house releases and popularity. During these decades the genre's maturation had accelerated.

In 2011, identical twins band, Revolution released "Teka Munike" featuring Mozambiquan singer Ruby Gold.

In 2012, afro house duo Vetkuk vs. Mahoota released the song "Via Orlando" featuring Dr. Malinga, the song was a rendition of Monwa & Sun's 1988 released "Orlando Hangover" ,the song's release in all probability, inspired other South African afro-house hit-singles thereafter most notably, in 2013 kwela and afro house duo Mafikizolo featuring Uhuru's "Khona".

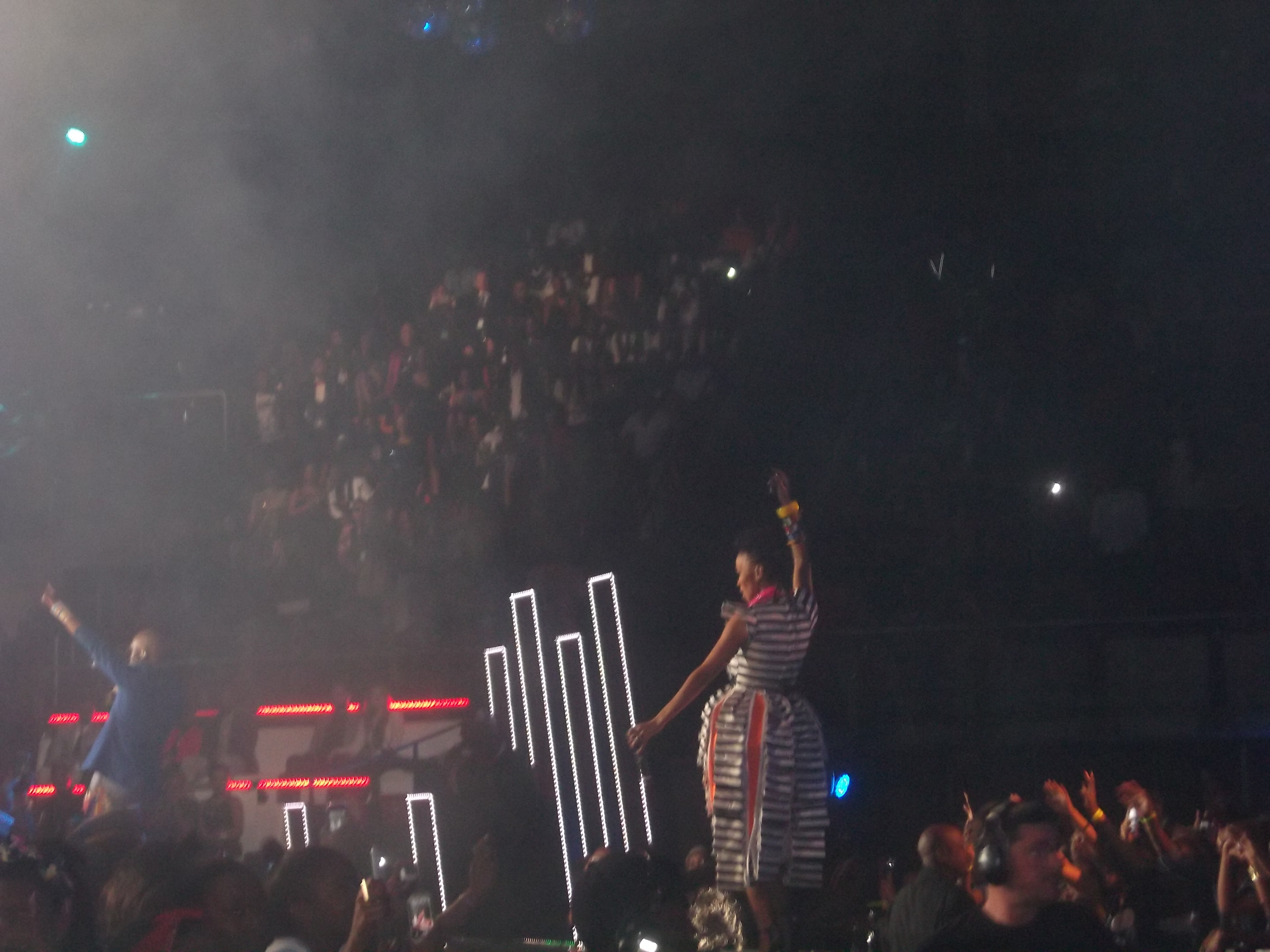
Mafikizolo at the MTV Africa Music Awards.

In 2014, Mafikizolo won eight awards at the South African Music Awards. Mi Casa won the Best Dance Album, DJ Kent ft. The Arrows, The Highest Airplay of the Year, for "Spin My World Around" and Oskido, Remix of the Year, for "Tsa Ma Ndebele".

Portuguese artists such as DJEFF (formerly known as Djeff Afrozila) accelerated the genre's popularity by performing a live mix from the DJ Mag, headquarters in Hoxton.

Central African, music producer Boddhi Satva and Congolese songster Kaysha, released their best-hit, single, "Mama Kosa".

DJ Clock and band, Beatenberg, won six awards at the South African Music Awards for "Pluto (Remember You)". The smash-hit, also received the SAMPRA award, for Highest Airplay of the Year.

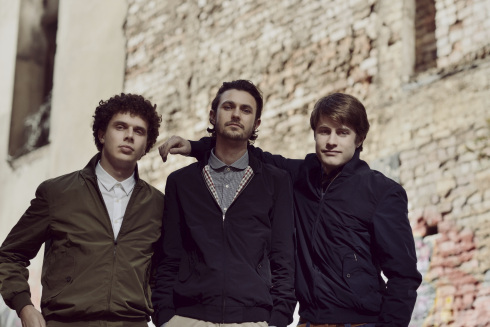
Beatenberg, band.

At the time, South African 3-year-old, DJ Arch Jnr. appeared to be the world's first, youngest DJ. He won SA's Got Talent, received a standing ovation for his performance on America's Got Talent and competed in "World's Got Talent" in China. Arch Jnr. obtained and holds a Guinness World Record as the youngest, club DJ in the world.

In 2016, Gondwana KE was founded in Kenya by Eugene Onyago and Suraj Mandavia, the event and label predominantly showcases South African Afro house artists such as Karyendasoul, Citizen Deep, Punk Mbedzi, Frigid Armadillo and Sun El Musician. As well as Kenyan, afro-house artists such as Ayrosh.

The "Koze Kuse" hit-maker, DJ Merlon released the album "Original Copy".

Angolan, producer Afro Warriors released "Uyankenteza" featuring vocalist, Toshi. The song was remixed by Hyenah.

In 2017, Beatport updated its platform with an additional Afro house category.

in 2017 Drums Radio is launched by Mr Silk dedicated to Afrohouse and African Electronic Music

In 2018, South African DJ and music producer, Euphonik won the Best Newcomer DJ, award at the DJ Awards under his new alias, "Themba".

In 2019, four South African Afro house DJs were nominated at the DJ Awards for the "afro house", genre. Da Capo won the first-ever, Afro House category, award.

Usher and Black Coffee collaborated on "LaLaLa". Prior to the song's release they performed together at the Global Citizen Festival: Mandela 100, in 2018.

A video of the Hilton College marimba band, in KwaZulu-Natal performing the Black Coffee and French, multi- number 1 DJ, in the world, David Guetta, song "Drive" featuring singer Delilah Montagu went viral.

Prince Kaybee and Msaki's,"Fetch Your Life" won The House Record of the Year at the African Dance Music Awards.

=== 2020s ===
In 2020, Darque and Shimza established, the afro-house, label Kunye as well as event U'R.

Master KG and singer, Nomcebo Zikode's globally viral-hit, "Jerusalema" debuted on Billboard and Apple, music charts as number 1. The song was largely accredited to popularizing song, dance-challenges. The song's remix featuring Burna Boy reached diamond, status in France. Nomcebo's debut hit-single, in 2018 "Emazulwini" featured DJ Ganyani.

In 2021, the British house music record label, Defected Records launched an afro house label, Sondela, and the first released song "Ezizweni" was by South Africans DJ Tira, Hyenah and jazz singer, Luke Ntombela.

Afro-house, DJ and producer FKA Mash paid homage to kwaito, mbaqanga, marabi and kwela in his "Love Songs From Soweto", album.

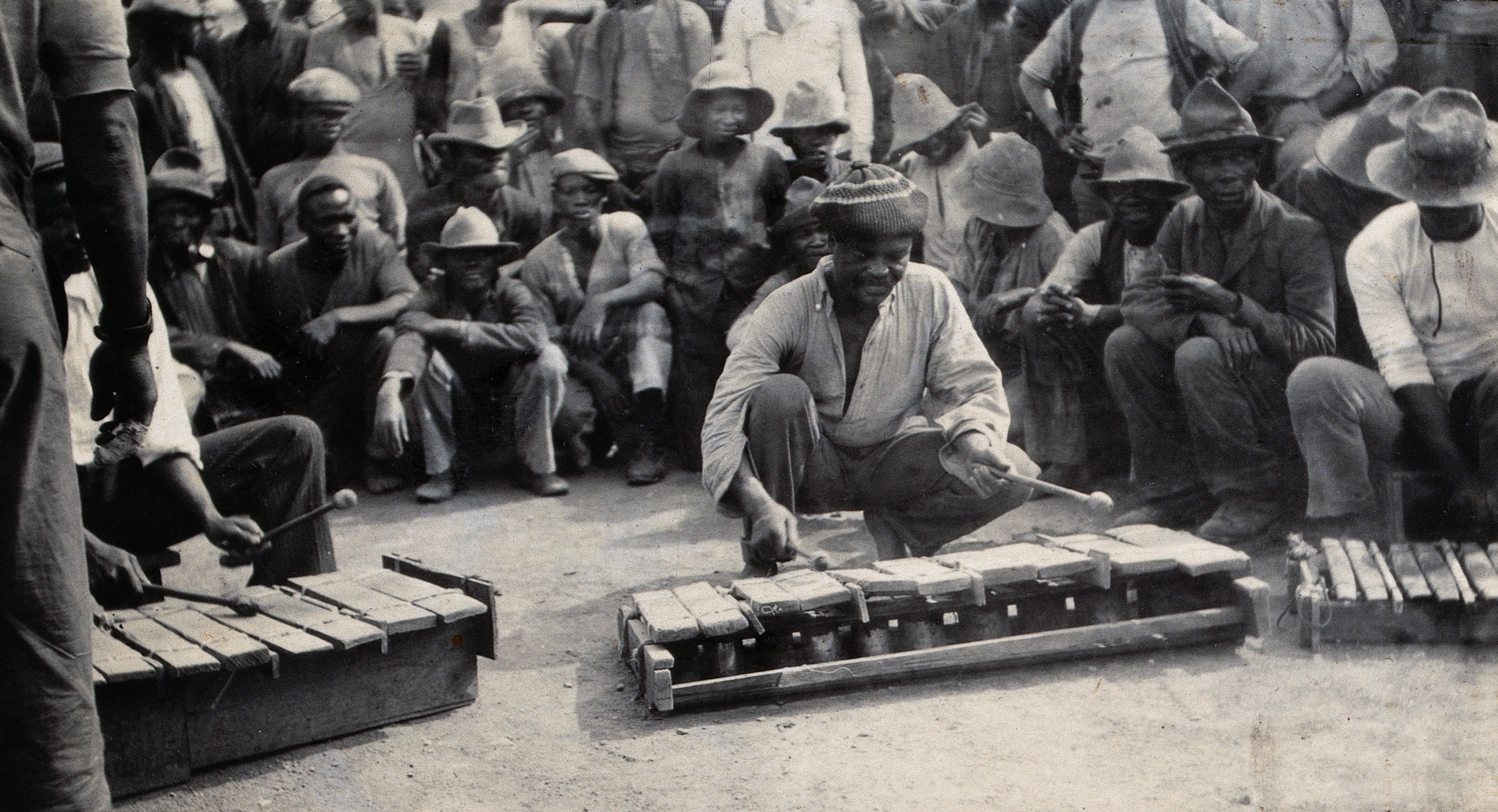
South African miners playing instruments at Du Toit's Pan mine in, 1905.

South African poetic afro-house, vocalist, DJ and producer Lazarusman as well as German, duo Booka Shade were nominated at the Grammies for the album, "Dear Future Self".

David Guetta, Master KG and Akon released the single, "Shine Your Light".

Francis Mercier, a DJ and producer based in New York, released his remake of the influential composition "Premier Gaou" by the globally acclaimed Ivorian music group, Magic System. The original version was one of Africa's biggest records, achieving widespread recognition on a global scale in the late 1990s. Mercier revitalized the song by sharing his afro-house rendition in collaboration with, Spinnin' Records.

In 2022, Mixmag showcased German-Nigerian DJ JAMIIE at, The Lab Johannesburg.

Chymamusique, won Album of the Year, Best Dance Album and Male Artist of the Year for his album "Musique" at the South African Music Awards.

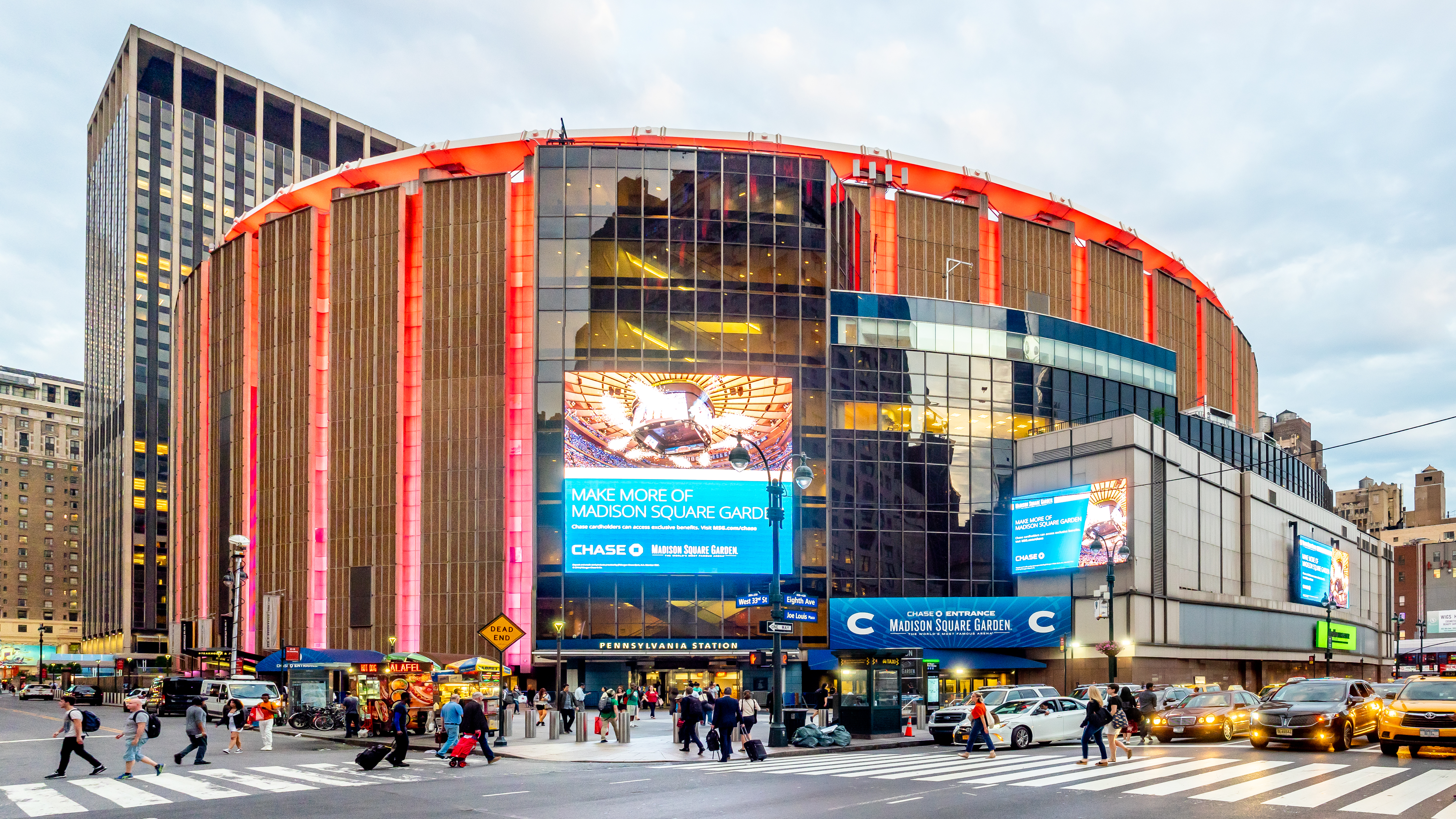
Madison Square Garden, Manhattan.

In 2023, Black Coffee was the first African DJ and record producer, to fill up Madison Square Garden in New York City. Supporting acts were inclusive of musicians such as singer Bucie, Monique Bingham, afro-house songster, Shoba (formerly Shota), South African vocalist Portia Monique, singer and songwriter Msaki and a 12 piece-orchestra.

German music collective, Keinemusik was listed as number 1, in the top-selling afro house charts on Beatport. Moblack Records founded by Italian Mimmo Falcone(MoBlack) in 2013, was listed as the number 1, best selling record label on Beatport.

Travis Scott and Drake joined Black Coffee at his live DJ, set performances.

When the South African national rugby team, the Springboks returned to South Africa, after winning the 2023 Rugby World Cup in France, they engaged in a brief, jollification to afro house, global hit-single "Osama" by Grammy-award-winning musician, Zakes Bantwini featuring, Kasango.

Ollie makes his First AFRO house song in 2024-2025

== Notable record labels ==
Notable Afro house record labels include:

- House Afrika
- MoBlack Records
- Spinnin' Records
- Keinemusik
- Ostowana
- Aluku Rebels
