= 6th Mzansi Kwaito and House Music Awards =

Mzansi Kwaito and House Music Awards
- Date: November 27, 2021
- Venue: Sun City Super Bowl, North West
- Country: South Africa

Highlights
- Most nominations: Trompies (4)
- Website: www.mkhma.co.za

The Annual 6th Mzansi Kwaito and House Music Awards is the 6th edition of Mzansi Kwaito and House Music Awards. It was held at Sun City Super Bowl, North West.

The nominees were announced on June 16, 2021. Trompies lead the nominations with 4.

== Background ==
The ceremony is scheduled to take place at Sun City Super Bowl, North West on November 27, 2021. The full list of nominees for the 6th ceremony of Mzansi Kwaito and House Music awards was announced on June 16, 2021.

== Winners and nominees ==
Below the list are the nominees. Winners are listed first and in bold.

**Best Producer**: **Guffy Pilane**; DJ Maphorisa; TNS; Master KG	**Best Kwaito Song of 2010-2015**: **Mgarimbe — Sister Bettina (2013)**; Professor ft DJ Tira — Jezebel (2010); Arthur Mafokate — Hlokoloza (2011); Trompies — Senatla (2014)
**Best AmaPiano Song**: **Mapara A Jazz featuring Ntosh Gazi & Colano — John Vuli Gate**; MFR Souls — Amanikiniki; Focalistic featuring Vigro Deep — Ke Star; DBN Gogo, Blaqnick & MasterBlaq featuring Mpura, M.J. & Ama Avenger — Khuza Gogo	**Best Kwaito Artist**: **Jakarumba**; L’vovo; Picat; Professor
**Best Gqom Artist**: **Mampintsha**; Andile Mpisane; Tipcee; Madanon	**Most Voted Song**: **Rethabile Khumalo featuring Master KG — Ntyilo Ntyilo**; Kabza De Small & DJ Maphorisa featuring Samthing Soweto, Aymos, Mas Musiq & Myztro — Emcimbini; Mapara A Jazz featuring Ntosh Gazi & Colano — John Vuli Gate; Prince Kaybee featuring Shimza, Black Motion & Ami Faku — Uwrongo
**Best Music Video**: **Ama Mask – Anaconda featuring Ntosh Gazi**; Long Live Kwaito – Jamaika Convers featuring Mabuzza; Nkulunkulu – Kamo Mphela; Murahu – Makhadzi featuring Mr Brown	**New Age Kwaito Artist**: **Mdavovo – Kaptein**; Chakalaka featuring Stan B & Miss V – Can't Get; DJ Tseva – Spiritual; DJ Zbu Sgebengu – Beef Ka Malambani; Kaitist Joe – Makhwapheni; Man T – Ke Nako; Rova City – Kuyezwakala; Seshmoola & Bravo – Ujes’uhlal’eZola; Success SA – Ama’Boza; Taminology – One Time
**Best New House Artist**: **Chomza – S'khaftin**; DJ Sammy Dollar98 – Could This Be; DJ Spencer Tmb – Ntoyami; Siya Muziek – Pretending To Be Fine	**Best Collaboration (Kwaito/Gqom/House/Amapiano)**: **Amanikiniki – MFR Souls featuring Kamo Mphela, Bontle Smith, Major League DJ's**; Thandolwam Nguwe – Mr Brown & Rubber Soul featuring Zanda Zakuza & Makhadzi; Uwrongo – Prince Kaybee ft Shimza, Black Motion & Ami Faku; Ukhala Kanjani – Trompies featuring Sjava & Mbuzeni
**Best Station That Plays Kwaito**: **Mahikeng FM**; Gagasi FM; Ligwalagwala FM; Radio 2000	**Best DJ**: **DJ Cleo**; DBN Gogo; DJ Ganyani; Sun-El Musician
**Best House Artist**: **Msaki**; Bucie; Mpumi; Naakmusiq	**Best Kwaito Single**: **Njandini – Kwesta**; Sukuma Mkami – L’vovo & Danger featuring Mampintsha; Sekawinile – Professor featuring DJ Tira, Kamoo Letsosa and Pex Africah; Ukhala Kanjani – Trompies featuring Sjava and Mbuzeni
**Best Group/Duo**: **Trompies**; Bongo Maffin; MFR Souls; Soul Majestik	**Best New Amapiano Artist**: **Scylash featuring Masoja – Lenyora**; EL Rhythms – Supaman; Mashankura SA – Skobo; Mbizo featuring MFR Souls & Tshepo King – Jabulisa Abantu
**Best House Single**: **Sabela – Citizen Deep featuring Thiwe**; Marry Me – Black Motion featuring Msaki; Tsamaya – Heavy K featuring Professor; Yekokwam – Leroy Styles & Zakes Bantwini	**2021 Special Category**: **Intwemnandi Remix – Mrijo The Havock**; Bhampa Mkhelele – Abofezela featuring Bob Mabena & Sibonelo; Ayoba – Gearboxx; Muzika – Not Guilty featuring T-Man Gavini
**Best New Kwaito Artist**: **OGK4Lyf ft KB the Suspect – Lokshin**; Abokaukau – Abayaz ' ikwaito; Buda Da Element – Dlala Mbijan; Castro ft Nkozah, Chinaman & Spy2 – Namhlanje; Mr Jovilove – Wena Wedwa; Mtezman – Mongameli; Pizos – iKasi; Slender Dee – Banamanga; Slo’ Makoya – Beach to Beach; Super Red C - Nora	**Lifetime Achievement** **HHP**
