= Magubane =

Magubane is a surname found in South Africa. Notable people with this surname include:

- Bernard Magubane (1930 – 2013), a South African sociologist and anti-apartheid activist
- Emmanuel Magubane (active 1999 – 2014), a South African politician
- Peter Magubane (1932 – 2024), a South African photographer
- Tebogo Jacko Magubane (born 1982), a South African DJ and musician
- Zine Magubane, a South African-American sociologist
