= House Guru Gang =

Namibian kwaito and Afro house music group

House guru gang
- Origin: Rundu, Kavango East, Namibia
- Genres: House Music; Afro House
- Years active: 2014–present
- Labels: Cool Aid Inc, House Guru Gang
- Members: Matias "Jowdy" Sappy; Richard "Chahelman" Kahengutji; Gerson "Nasho" Baptista
- Website: www.facebook.com/housegurugangz/

House Guru Gang is a Namibian kwaito and Afro house music group, whose original line-up consisted of Kahengutji "Chahelman" Richard, Sappy “Jowdy” Mathias and Baptista “Nasho” Gerson. Formed in 2014, the group originates from Rundu, Kavango East. Their name was inspired by a Swedish house music supergroup Swedish House Mafia. House Guru Gang is known for their hit songs Tachie, Maria Nepembe and Blessings

== History ==
=== Early years ===
The group came together after realising their common interest in music in 2014. Nasho Beats came from Cool Aid Music Production with whom the House Guru Gang is currently signed. Dj Chahelman is a former producer at Starlite Entertainment, and Jowdy, a former producer at Supreme Records and Entertainment.

=== Born to be a star success ===
In 2014 they released their debut album called Born to be a star which consisted of hit tracks like Tachie, Guru Dance, Ekero and Kadona. Guru dance and Kangona was nominated in the Namibia Annual Music Awards for Best House and Best Afro pop but no award was worn. House Guru Gang described the album as an experiment because that is the time they took their music as a career and they were still exploring different sounds.

== Father Bless Us(2016) ==
In the Summer of 2016 House Guru Gang released their second studio album titled “Father Bless Us”. They have worked with artist such as 4X4 too much power, Dj Doza etc. The album was produced and mastered by themselves except for "Moment" which they collaborated with Dj Doza. This album wasn't much of a success because they were struggling with marketing and distribution but they were again nominated for Best Afro pop and best duo in the 2016/2017 Namibia Annual Music Awards which they won the best duo/group award.

== The Noise ==
In April 2017 they released a single track titled Maria Nepembe on the Namibia music.com website and they later announced in "The Villager" website that they will be working on their third album called The Noise which they described as their best work. In November 2017 the album was released and it received good critics from both the media and fans.

== Discography ==
=== Albums ===
Album title	Album details
Born to be a star	Released: 2014; Label: Cool Aid Inc; Formats: CD, Digital download
Father bless us	Released: 2016; Label: Cool Aid Inc; Formats: CD, Digital download
The Noise	Released: 2018; Label: Cool Aid Inc; Formats: CD, Digital download

== Awards and nominations ==
Year	Award Ceremony	Prize	Work/Recipient	Result
2015	2015 Namibia Annual Music Awards	Best House	"Kadona"	Nominated
2015	2015 Namibia Annual Music Awards	Best Afro pop	"Guru dance ft Neslow"	Nominated
2017	2017 Namibia Annual Music Awards	Best Afro pop	"Blessings"	Nominated
2017	2017 Namibia Annual Music Awards	Best group/duo	"Blessings"	Won
2018	2018 Namibia Annual Music Awards	Best Afro pop	"The Noise"	Nominated
2018	2018 Namibia Annual Music Awards	Best group/duo	"Pressure"	Nominated
