= Dream (Lebo Mathosa album) =

2000 studio album

Studio album by Lebo Mathosa
- Released: 2000
- Genre: Dance
- Length: 51:08
- Producer: Lebo Mathosa; Christos Katsaitis; Ignatius Motshwane; T.R. Faku; Otis Fraser; Mandla Msomi

Lebo Mathosa chronology
Dream (2000)	Drama Queen (2004)

Dream is the solo debut album of South African kwaito singer Lebo Mathosa. The album was released in 2000, after Mathosa left her role singing with the group Boom Shaka the year before. For Dream, Mathosa won three South African Music Awards for Best Dance Album, Best Dance Single, and Best Female Vocalist.

== Track listing ==
All tracks are written by Lebo Mathosa, except track 4 written by Mathosa and Simphiwe Dana.

Dream
No.	Title	Producer(s)	Length
1.	"Dream (Intro)"	Mathosa	0:41
2.	"Ntozabantu"	Christos Katsaitis, Ignatius Motshwane	5:10
3.	"Celebrate"	Katsaitis, Motshwane	5:21
4.	"How Can I?"	Katsaitis, Motshwane	6:00
5.	"Do Right"	T.R. Faku	3:45
6.	"First Time Lalalala"	Mathosa, Otis Fraser	5:49
7.	"Spiritual Freedom"	Mathosa, Fraser	5:55
8.	"Lord"	Mathosa, Mandla Msomi	3:49
9.	"Baby Baby"	Fraser	4:40
10.	"Fall in Love with Me"	Faku	3:50
11.	"My Love"	Mathosa, Msomi	6:08
Total length:			51:08
