= Lebo Mathosa =

- Born: Lebohang Precious Mathosa; 17 July 1977; Daveyton, Benoni, South Africa
- Origin: South Africa
- Died: 23 October 2006 (aged 29) Germiston, South Africa
- Genres: Kwaito, Hip hop
- Occupations: Singer, actress
- Years active: 1994–2006
- Labels: EMI Africa; Bula Records

Lebohang Precious Mathosa (17 July 1977– 23 October 2006) was a South African kwaito singer. Mathosa started her career as a founding member of the popular South African band Boom Shaka in 1994 at the age of 17, after she caught the eye of music producer Don Laka at a club in Johannesburg.

She was well known for her dyed blonde hair, her live shows, her hoarse voice, her constant reinvention, her energetic dance moves and outrageous stage outfits, and was openly bisexual. She was frequently compared to the South African singer Brenda Fassie who influenced her career, who died in 2004. Mathosa won the Style Best Dressed Woman of the Year Award in 2001, and was nominated by FHM magazine as one of Africa's sexiest women.

Mathosa died in a car crash after a great performance, aged 29 when her driver lost control of the vehicle, a Toyota Prado, in which they were travelling on the N3 Highway in the East Rand.

== Early life ==
Lebo Mathosa was born in Daveyton, a township just outside Benoni. Lebo attended St. Mary's High School. Lebo began by singing at seven years old in her local church choir. When her family moved to Johannesburg, she discovered bubblegum music, which is a kind of disco-infused pop that was popularised by people like Brenda Fassie, who Mathosa considered an idol, and was later likened to a prodigy of.

== Career ==
At the age of fourteen, Mathosa was discovered by Dj Oskido, and soon after, she joined the group Boom Shaka. Boom Shaka became an instant success and one of the most prominent Kwaito groups in South Africa. Some have argued that the success was in part due to Mathosa's sex appeal, in attire and dance style. Boom Shaka's first album, About Time, was an instant hit, but they ran into controversy with their last album when they infused and remixed a version of the South African national anthem, "Nkosi Sikelela". After leaving Boom Shaka, Mathosa started her solo career and was very successful. She was also a pioneer in the field of copyrights for South African artists. in a move unheard of for the industry and especially for a female, Mathosa negotiated and secured full publishing rights and ownership for her work. Mathosa shared a stage with Keith Sweat, and was featured on his remix:"I'll Trade". At the time of her death at age twenty-nine in a car accident, Mathosa had plans to start her own label.

=== Solo ===
She turned solo in 1999. Her debut solo album Dream went gold within a month of its launch in 2000. At the 2000 South African Music Awards, Mathosa won three South African Music Awards; Best Dance Album for Dream, Best Dance Single for her debut single Ntozabantu from the same album, and Best Female Vocalist. Her next album, Drama Queen, released in 2004, again earned the SA Music Award for Best Dance Album.'Drama Queen' was a turning point in Mathosa's music, as she shifted from her Boom Shaka roots, Kwaito, to a more soulful, funk, and Disco sound.The album Dream Queen tried different styles to break out of the house and kwaito mould.

Lebo topped the South African pop charts in 2004 with hits like 'I Love Music', 'Awu Dede', and 'Dangerous' ft Jazz. With her last album 'Lioness (2006)' Lebo infused pop music with traditional music. The album consisted of summer hits like 'Bran New Day', 'Sweet love', and 'Take me there'. The album also earned Lebo a British MOBO award nomination in 2006 in the 'Best African Act category'. She performed all over the world, from Southern Africa to Malaysia to Trafalgar Square in London, one of her most significant performances being at Nelson Mandela's 85th birthday party. She also toured the US with the show The Vagina Monologues. Her appearance in a show with such a positive feminist message is indicative of the attitude held by Mathosa, who, according to author Zine Magube, has become "a role model for many young South African women, [appearing] at first glance to simply be reinforcing stereotypes about the wanton nature of Black female sexuality. Some critics have argued however that Boom Shaka's female members have used 'the skimpy clothes, the gyrating hips, and simulated sex onstage to promote a variety of apposite concerns.'" This strong pro-feminist attitude combined with her often shocking onstage sexuality earned her the nickname "The New Madonna of the Townships". Mathosa also tried her hand acting, television shows which included Backstage, Generations and Muvhango.

== Endorsements ==
The late musician Lebo Mathosa had received an endorsement from the legendary Jomo Sono.

== Television and film roles ==
Though she was mainly a singer, Mathosa had also tried her hand at acting and appeared in local television roles in soap operas such as Generations, Backstage and Muvhango. In 2003 Mathosa featured in the film, Soldiers of The Rock.

== Documentary ==
In 2019, 13 years after her death, a biopic was released about Mathosa titled Dream: The Lebo Mathosa Story. It was released on the BET Africa Network on 6 November. The biopic comprised six episodes.

=== Controversy ===
Mathosa's adult character was played by KB Motsinyalane and her teenage years were portrayed by Bahumi Madisakwane, daughter of choreographer and media personality Somizi Mhlongo and actress Palesa Madisakwane. The choice of casting of the biopic was a topic of discussion among viewers. Many suggestions made were for the role to have been reprised by Thandi Matlaila.

== Discography ==
- 2000: Dream
- 2004: Drama Queen
- 2006: Lionness
- 2024 : Infinitely

== See also ==
- Ladies In Song - Live In Concert
