= Mandla Mofokeng =

Spikiri
- Born: Mandla Daniel Mofokeng; 11 September 1967 (age 58); Meadowlands, Soweto, South Africa
- Genres: Kwaito
- Occupations: Musician; singer; producer
- Years active: 1985–present
- Label: Kalawa Jazmee Records

Mandla Daniel Mofokeng (born 11 September 1967) is a kwaito musician, singer and producer known as "Spikiri" from Meadowlands, Soweto and a member of the Kwaito group Trompies

He started his career as a dancer in 1985, under the tutelage of South African musician Sello "Chicco" Twala. He later formed a disco group called MM De Luxe with friend M'du Masilela in 1988. This duo recorded two successful albums in 1989 and 1990 and introduced what came to be known as township kwaito today. His passion for music led Mandla to enroll at Fuba Music School in 1991 to study engineering and piano. In the 1990s he was producing music for the likes of Chimora, Kamazu, Senyaka and Fatty Boom Boom better known as Tsekeleke. Known for his unassuming demeanour, Mandla Mofokeng is a founder member of the seminal kwaito group Trompies, which has released a number of albums, some of which are regarded as classics of the genre. He is also a founder member and co-director of the influential record label Kalawa Jazzmee, which has released many well-known kwaito artists, including Boom Shaka, Bongo Muffin, Alaska, B.O.P (Brothers of Peace), and Thebe. Currently he sits on the board of directors at Kalawa Jazmee Recording company and is also one of the masterminds in the DCC (Dangerous Combination Crew) the production team of the company. His contributions include successful records by Brothers of Peace, Thebe, Bongo Maffin, Alaska, Mafikizolo, Jakarumba, MaWillies and the late Tokollo and Kabelo' solo projects. In addition, he was one of the award-winning Mafikizolo and Kabelo's producers. Mandla 'Spikiri's diverse music talents can be witnessed in projects in which he has worked with artists from other music genres, these include Don Laka, Moses Molelekwa, Bra Hugh Masikela, Vicky Vilakazi and Hashi Elimhlopheh.

== Music career ==
In 1998 He released his debut EP Skonkonyana and officially released his debut studio album in 2001 Titled King Don Father 2001. He soon followed up with his second release King Don Father 2002 with hit single Vat en sit featuring Mandoza, Tokollo, Oskido & Stoan and returned again with the third album King Don Father Remixes Habashwe with the hit Singles Money Talks & Ndofaya Ft Kabelo, Thandiswa Mazwai, Stoan & Kamazu.

== Awards ==
At The Metro Fm Awards 2011 Spikiri received a lifetime achievement and again 2015 he received a lifetime achievement award at the South African Music Awards 2015 celebrating 30 years in the music industry. 2019 He also won Best Kwaito award for his album King Don Father 2018 and at the 2nd ceremony of Mzansi Kwaito and House Music Awards, he won Best Kwaito Male Artist award.

== Solo albums ==
- 2001 King Don Father 2001
- 2002 King Don Father 2002
- 2003 King Don Father Remixes Habashwe
- 2005 Simply The Best
- 2005 Ain't Nothing But A Gangstas Party
- 2007 Chalibaba
- 2008 Trouble
- 2009 Taking a walk on the wild side
- 2011 King Don Father 2.5
- 2018 King Don Father 2018

== EP`s ==
- 1998 Skonkonyana
