= Kalawa Jazmee Records =

South African record label

- Founder: Oskido; Christos Katsaitis; Don Laka
- Genre: Kwaito, house music, afropop
- Country of origin: South Africa
- Location: Johannesburg
- Official website: kalawa.co.za

Kalawa Jazmee Records is an independent record label based in South Africa. The label is known for its contribution to the development of the Kwaito genre of music in South Africa.

== Artists ==
- Oskido
- Professor
- Mandla Mofokeng
- Trompies
- DJ Maphorisa
- Uhuru
- Vigro Deep
- Boom Shaka
- Mafikizolo
- Candy Tsa Mandebele
- DJ Zinhle
- Busiswa
