= Matshediso Mholo =

South African musician

Matshediso Florence Mholo is a South African artist and activist and a member of the multi-platinum Afro-pop group Malaika.

== Musical career ==
Mholo met fellow group members Bongani Nchang and the late Jabulani Ndaba in a church choir in 2003, while teaching music and drama at the Mabana Cultural Centre in Mmabatho.

== Charity work ==
Mholo has been involved in a number of campaigns on behalf of orphans (especially AIDS orphans) and abused women. She is also an Aids activist and was voluntarily tested for HIV in October 2006 an attempt to set an example.
