= World Peace Party =

Warehouse rave in South Africa

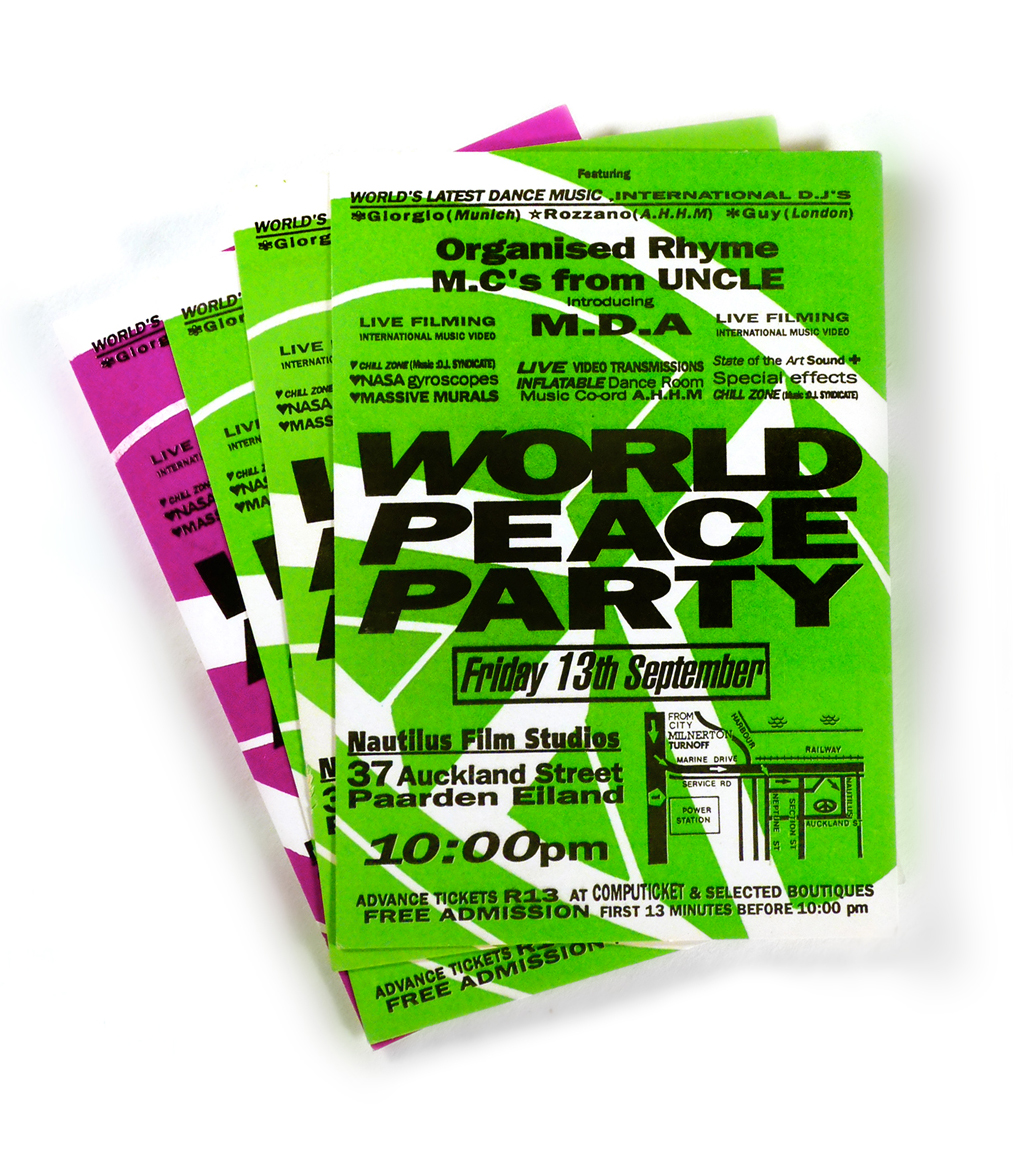
World Peace Party flyer 1991

The World Peace Party was a warehouse rave held in South Africa on Friday, 13 September 1991. It is considered to be the first rave in Africa.

The event was produced in South Africa, by the Cape Town based UFO Collective. Founders Carl Mason and Jesse Stagg teamed up to start UFO (an acronym for Unlimited Freak Out or Unity of People, Freedom of Expression, Original Ideas). The event featured live musical acts in proto Zef punk-rave-rappers the MC's from UNCLE and local rap acts Organized Rhyme, $O$ ($ell-Out $yndicate) and Krishna with early House Disc Jockeys DJ Giorgio and Rozzano (now known as RealRozzano) with support by DJ Tony Smith. The event lasted 14 hours and was attended by approximately 3,500 people.

The venue was the Nautilus soundstage in the Paarden Eiland industrial zone, an area on the edge of Cape Town, reclaimed from the ocean. The location came with a 40 foot by 10 foot Infinity Curve, which served as backdrop for an elaborate fluorescent mural depicting the "journey of the beat" from Africa through Europe and the West and back to Africa in the form of a UFO. The mural was painted in a Mayan inspired hip hop cartoon wild style and incorporated Amiga custom computer animations promoting positive affirmations and distinctive UFO branding. This level of artistic sophistication was unusual in the early years of the international rave scene.

The World Peace Party featured an inside and outside area complete with the soon to be ubiquitous fun park of inflatable castles, human gyroscopes and vendors serving fast foods and miscellany.

Given the political context of the time, and with the Apartheid regime still in power and Nelson Mandela still in prison, security was a major concern. The promoters assembled a large team of well-trained, mixed-race security personnel, who expertly managed the overwhelmingly mixed-race crowd who had rarely, partied together in such a context. No incidents of violence of any kind were reported.

The following dawn many hundreds of participants lined the side of the N1 highway as they walked the 5 miles back to Cape Town.

As much a posse as a production company, the UFO team comprised a loose band of artists, designers, students, models, engineers and partygoers. UFO comprised in part: Nik Jevons, Brendan Smithers, Roger Young, Raymond and Andrew Mpolokeng, Nicole Abel, Toni Dorfman, Edward Petersen, Shukrie Joel among others.

The UFO production team went on to open several permanent venues to promote electronic music, most notably the first dedicated dance club of its kind on the continent, Club Eden.

== Vandalism ==
During the ubiquitous marketing campaign, the signature black-and-white teaser posters, emblazoned with a strong 3D graphic of a peace symbol and only the date, Friday 13 September, were vandalized with green paint across the city of Cape Town. Evidence suggested it was the work of a Christian fringe group, who took issue with the peace sign, claiming Satanic influence. The promoters used this controversy to their advantage and enlisted the State media to publicise the event.

== Summerluv ==
Another event took place in the same location 6 months earlier, under the name Summerluv. This event was produced by Jesse Stagg in conjunction with Anton Resnekov. Although seminal, and well received, it was on a smaller scale with approximately 300 people in attendance.
