= Gavin Steingo =

South African ethnomusicologist and scholar

- Born: 1981 (age 44–45); Johannesburg, South Africa
- Education: University of Pennsylvania
- Occupations: Ethnomusicologist, Professor
- Years active: 2010–present
- Employer: Princeton University
- Notable work: Kwaito’s Promise: Music and the Aesthetics of Freedom in South Africa

Gavin Steingo (born 1981) is a South African ethnomusicologist and Professor of Music at Princeton University. His work explores the roles of music and sound in shaping global modernity, with a focus on African music, sound studies, and acoustic ecology.

== Early life and education ==
Steingo was born in Johannesburg, South Africa. He earned his PhD in the anthropology of music from the University of Pennsylvania in 2010. From 2010 to 2012, he was a Mellon Postdoctoral Fellow at Columbia University in New York.

== Academic career ==
Steingo joined the faculty at Princeton University as an assistant professor of music. His research examines music and sound as fundamental aspects of global modernity, addressing themes such as interspecies communication, the politics of representation, and the aesthetics of freedom. He employs a multidisciplinary methodology, integrating theory, history, and ethnography.

Steingo's first book, Kwaito’s Promise: Music and the Aesthetics of Freedom in South Africa (University of Chicago Press, 2016), investigates Kwaito and how South African musicians engage with concepts such as democracy and freedom. The book received the Alan P. Merriam Prize in 2017 for its contributions to the field of ethnomusicology.

His second book, Interspecies Communication: Sound and Music Beyond Humanity, explores human efforts to communicate with non-human species and the broader implications for language, beauty, and spirituality.

== Selected works ==
- Kwaito’s Promise: Music and the Aesthetics of Freedom in South Africa (2016)
- Remapping Sound Studies (2019), co-edited with Jim Sykes
- Interspecies Communication: Sound and Music Beyond Humanity (2024)

== Editorial and collaborative projects ==
Steingo is the co-editor of the book series “Critical Conjunctures in Music and Sound” for Oxford University Press. He also serves on the editorial boards of Analytical Approaches to African Music, and is the co-founder of the research group Origins of Creativity.

== Recognition ==
Steingo has received grants and fellowships from institutions such as the Andrew W. Mellon Foundation, the National Endowment for the Humanities, the Alexander von Humboldt Foundation, the Max Planck Institute for the History of Science, and the Alzheimer's Association. His contributions to the field have been widely recognized, with Kwaito’s Promise earning praise in academic reviews and inspiring creative works, such as an album by South African musician King Razo. In 2024, Steingo was awarded a Fellowship at the Getty Research Institute.
