= Professor (musician) =

South African musician (born 1978)

- Born: Mkhonzeni Langa; March 27, 1978 (age 48); Port Shepstone, KwaZulu-Natal, South Africa
- Occupations: Musician; songwriter
- Musical career
- Origin: Umlazi, Durban, South Africa
- Genres: Kwaito
- Instrument: Vocals
- Years active: 1996–present
- Labels: Kalawa Jazmee; Proper Files

Mkhonzeni Langa (born 27 March 1978) better known by his stage name Professor is a South African Kwaito musician from Durban. He first rose to prominence as part of the Durban-based Kwaito duo Tzozo and Professor before branching out on his own making a mark on the South African music industry with hit songs such as Jezebel, "Imoto", "Lento", "Fingerprints", "Speaker" & "Unobenga".

He signed a record deal with Kalawa Jazmee and released his debut album University of Kalawa Jazmee (2010), which earned him his first award Best Kwaito Album.

== Career ==
In 1995, Professor was discovered by South African music producers Lindelani Mkhize, of Joyous Celebration and Spikiri (Mandla Mofokeng) of Trompies while he was performing. In 1996, he moved to the city of Johannesburg to pursue a music career. During this time the Kwaito genre was fast approaching its peak with musicians such as Arthur Mafokate and Mdu Masilela at the very prime of their careers.

=== 2003–2009: Tzozo and Professor ===
In 2003, Professor was signed to Kalawa Jazmee Records by Oskido and Spikiri. At Kalawa Jazmee Records Professor was pair up with an already established Kwaito singer Tzozo, and together they formed a duo which was known as Tzozo & Professor. The emergence of Tzozo & Professor also marked the emergence of the subgenre, Durban Kwaito Music, spanning from the original genre pioneered by the very label that signed them, Kalawa Jazmee Records. While together the duo released three albums: Woze Durban, Amantombazane, and Magazine.

=== 2010–2016: University of Kalawa Jazmee, Orientation ===
In 2010, Professor released his debut album as a solo artist under Kalawa Jazmee Records. The album was titled University of Kalawa Jazmee selling triple platinum 120 000 copies and its lead single titled "Jezebel", It was a runaway success and catapulted to even higher levels of success as an artist and launched as an individual rather than part of the duo. The songs contained in the album were so strong that every single that came out of it was critically praised; this includes, "Jimaphi le Weight", "Imoto" and "Lento". Furthermore, at the year 2010 edition of the Metro FM Music Awards the album was nominated in three categories; Best Kwaito Album, Song of the Year (Jezebel) and Best Collaboration. He went on to win Best Kwaito Album and the coveted Song of the Years Award. At the 21st South African Music Awards held on 19 April 2015 at Sun City in the North West the album, University of Kalawa Jazmee, won Best Kwaito Album.

In 2012, Professor returned with his second solo offering titled Orientation. The album was preceded by singles "Baphi", "Fingerprints", "Ntombazam" & "I Wish". In that album Professor worked a numerous established musicians including Magesh, Speedy, AKA, Zakwe, Ishmael, Stoan, Stax and Zola among other. One of the popular songs on the album was "Fingerprints" which he did with his brother, Character and legendary South African record producer Oskido. "Orientation" won Best Kwaito Album and secured Professor the Best Male Artist Award at the 12th Annual Metro FM Music Awards.

In 2015, Professor released a hit single titled "Nguye Lona" in which he featured Sdudla no Mathousand & Heavy-K. Also in 2015 Professor he was featured on the smash hit, "KOTW anthem", by Sphectacula and DJ Naves from their debut studio album, Kings of the Weekend. In "KOTW anthem" Professor's deep husky voice features prominently. In 2017, he collaborated with Sandra Ndebele, a Zimbabwean artist on her song "Lizwile." The song debuted at number 22 in the iTunes Top 200 tracks Australia World Music.

=== 2021-present: new music ===
In March 2022, his single "Ezangakini" featuring Shwi and Sun-El Musician was released.

== Durban Metro Police Uniform Incident ==
In February 2013 Professor attended the 12th Metro FM Music Awards held at the Inkosi Albert Luthuli International Convention Centre wearing the Durban Metro Police Uniform. In the days that followed Durban Metro Police spokesman Eugene Msomi was quoted saying, "Metro police are established in terms of the SAPS Act. If it is true that Professor was wearing the uniform, it is a criminal offence. Even if he was granted permission to do so, it comes with certain conditions."

It emerged that the uniform was in fact that of the Durban Metro Police and it belonged to his cousin who was with the force. Professor contacted Durban Metro Police and made a statement that he had taken his cousin's uniform, without his knowledge. He was later charged with impersonating a police officer, possession of a police uniform and wearing a police uniform.

Professor appeared at the Durban Magistrate's Court to face the charges and for violating SAPS Act of 1995 which states that it is an offence for anyone not a police officer to wear a police uniform without permission. He was fined R3000 (US$202.98), or one month in prison with the Durban Magistrate's Court ordering that half of the penalty would be conditionally suspended for three years.

== Discography ==
=== Albums ===
Album title	Album details
University of Kalawa Jazmee	Released: 1 January 2010; Label: Kalawa Jazmee Records; Formats: CD, Digital download
University of Kalawa Jazmee Since 1994	Released: 2 December 2014; Label: Kalawa Jazmee Records; Formats: CD, Digital download
Orientation	Released: 1 June 2012; Label: Kalawa Jazmee Records; Formats: CD, Digital download
Composed By Jesus Christ	Released: 26 January 2018; Label: Kalawa Jazmee Records/Proper Files; Formats: CD, Digital download
Journey	Released: 2 November 2019; Label: Kalawa Jazmee Records/ Cafe De Anatolia; Formats: CD, Digital download

== See also ==
- List of South African musicians
