= Trompies =

South African kwaito music group

- Origin: Soweto, Gauteng, South Africa
- Genres: Kwaito
- Label: Kalawa Jazmee Records
- Members: Mandla "Spikiri" Mofokeng; Eugene "Donald Duck" Mthethwa; Jairus "Jakarumba" Nkwe; Zynne "Mahoota" Sibika
- Past members: Emmanuel "Mjokes" Matsane (deceased)

Trompies is a South African music group formed in 1995 who specialise in kwaito music. The members Spikiri, Mahoota, Donald Duck, Jakarumba & Mjokes grew up together in the Soweto township and agreed to form a band after they had all completed their music studies in college. Beginning to make music in the mid-1990s, they released their debut album Sigiya Ngengoma in 1995. Trompies have since sold over half a million records and have become very successful in producing and managing other artists as well through their record label Kalawa Jazmee.

== History ==
On 1 January 2014, their 10th studio album Delicious was released. At the 21st ceremony of South African Music Awards was nominated for Best Kwaito Album. At the 2021 Music Kwaito and House Music Awards they received 4 nominations includes: Best Kwaito/Gqom Group, Best Kwaito Single, Best Kwaito Song and Best Collaboration.

== Trompies' influences ==
Kwaito groups such as Trompies routinely rap vernacular forms of the major indigenous languages, Xhosa, Sotho, Tswana, and Zulu. Their use of the vernacular is a conscious attempt to address the social, political, and economic issues that impact marginalized communities in ways that hold particular meaning for them. Language is critical for not only celebrating the uniqueness and legitimacy of local communities, but also for maintaining ties between artists and their audiences. Their members include Jairus "Jakarumba" Nkwe, Zynne "Mahoota" Sibika, Mandla "Spikiri" Mofokeng, Eugene Mthethwa & Emmanuel "Mjokes" Matsane. Each of the members makes shout outs to their families and very often to the bible. There have been references made to Psalm 23, "The lord is my shepherd…" and also to Cain and Abel, but the members say they are their brother's keepers. These allusions show how important this music is to them especially when they say that they are representing their hometowns.

Two of the group members had previous performing experience as dancers in the bubblegum group of Chicco Twala, and a third was the keyboard player for popular South African reggae artist Lucky Dube. This background in older forms of dancing and music lends to their music a style of singing and synchronized dancing and dressing that is much more often found in a pop group than in kwaito, which was previously thought of as the "music of gangsters" but is now, thanks in part to Trompies, becoming increasingly more well-respected.

== Mthethwa and kwaito's problems ==
Trompies member "Donald Duck" Mthethwa, now also the Anti-Piracy chairman of the Association of Independent Record Companies in South Africa, is a strong advocate for the rights of musicians in all genres, but especially in the kwaito genre. Among the concerns regarding kwaito that Mthethwa has expressed are that "kwaito (is) not being fully supported by the government" of South Africa, that "kwaito artists are being treated unfairly" by the recording industry of South Africa, and that the artists have to pay large taxes even when they work without a basic salary. Because of what Mthethwa and his bandmates experienced early on in their recording careers as far as being exploited and treated poorly by the white-run record labels, they are now very active is remedying the situation, doing everything from starting their own popular record label to lobbying the government for legislation to protect kwaito artists from foreign exploitation to writing books and articles on kwaito and its problems to get the message out to the general public. Spikiri also an original member.

== play ▶ Solo albums ==
- 1995: Sigiya Ngengoma - Trompies
- 1996: Mahoota
- 1997: Trap En Los
- 1998: Shosholoza
- 1999: 2 Cents 99 Remixes
- 2000: Mapantsula
- 2001: Boostin Kabelz
- 2004: Respect Toast Gona Gonati
- 2007: Cant Touch This
- 2014: Delicious
- 2025: Pantsula 4 Life
