= Oskido =

South African DJ and record producer (born 1976)

- Born: Oscar Sibonginkosi Mdlongwa; 29 November 1967 (age 58); Brits, South Africa
- Other names: Oscar Warona, Godzilla, The Big "O"
- Occupations: Record producer; businessman; DJ
- Musical career
- Genres: Kwaito; afro house; afropop; house music
- Years active: 1989–present
- Label: Kalawa Jazmee Records
- Website: oskidoibelieve.com

Oscar Sibonginkosi Mdlongwa (born 29 November 1967) is a South African recording artist, DJ, record producer and businessman. Having been in the music industry for over 26 years, Oskido has reached a prominent status in the South African music industry, more-so in popular youth culture. He is undoubtedly one of the pioneering artists that popularised the Kwaito genre of music outside of the townships of South Africa, and he's been central to the rise of Afro-house and opened doors for the new genre known as amapiano. Oskido is the co-founder of Kalawa Jazmee Records (formerly Kalawa Records), a record label that is home to musical acts like Mafikizolo, Bongo Maffin, and many other foremost groups.

== Life and career ==
=== 1967-1990: Early childhood ===
Oscar Sibonginkosi Mdlongwa born in November 26, 1967, to the late Zimbabwean father, Esaph Mdlongwa, who was a politician and his South African mother, Emily Sophia Molefi, in Oukasie township, Brits, North West, South Africa, Oskido spent most of his early life in Luveve Township, Bulawayo, Zimbabwe, where he went on to finish his basic education after graduating from Gifford High School, Bulawayo. He returned to Brits at the age of 21 in 1988 to run a family business in Lethlabile, Brits shop before he left for Johannesburg to pursue a career in music.

=== 1991-2006: Career beginnings ===
Oskido's career kicked off after he volunteered to perform at Razzmatazz when the scheduled DJ failed to show up. The late Ian Sigola played a major role in guiding him in the club scene by lending him his vinyls. After reworking songs and formulating his own sound in the studio, he went on to release the cassette compilations ‘Mixmaster’ and ‘Big Jam’, thus boosting his popularity outside of Johannesburg, before he was introduced to Bruce "Dope" Sebitlo, a South African music artist who went on partner Oskido in the Brothers of Peace group. Under the Brothers of Peace banner, Oskido and Sebitlo released and produced eight albums between 1994 and 2004, including the kwaito classic 'Makwerekwere' which discouraged Xenophobia on foreigners, as well as ‘Traffic Cop’ and the ground-breaking ‘Project A’ and ‘Zabalaza: Project B’ albums, which are Afro-house pioneers. The ‘Zabalaza’ title track made it to dancefloors across the globe when Louie Vega licensed and remixed it for his MAW Records label. He was also influential in setting up groups such as Mafikizolo, Bongo Muffin and Trompies.

At the 13th Metro FM Music Awards, he was awarded the Lifetime Achievement award.

On July 23, 2021, he released a single "Sizophelelaphi" with Msaki.

== Business ventures ==
=== Kalawa Jazmee ===
Kalawa Jazmee Records (sometimes "KJ Records") was formed as Kalawa in 1992 by Christos Katsaitis, Don Laka and DJ Oskido and took its name from the first two letters of Don & Christos respective surnames Wa was taken from Oskido's surname "Mdlongwa". Boom Shaka (Lebo Mathosa, Theo Nhlengethwa, Junior Sokhela and Thembi Seete) were the new label's first signing, with debut album "It's About Time" released in 1993.Joining with Trompie's label Jazmee in 1995, it then became known as Kalawa-Jazmee Records, later dropping the hyphen completely. The company is currently run by Oscar Mdlongwa, Don Laka, Bruce "Dope "Sebitlo, Zynne 'Mahoota' Sibika, Mandla 'Spikiri' Mofokeng, and Emmanuel 'Mjokes' Matsane. The record label has been at the forefront of youth culture and has produced other top acts like Bongo Maffin, Mafikizolo, Thebe, Alaska, Professor, Uhuru, Dr Malinga, Black Motion, Zonke, Winnie Khumalo, DJ Zinhle, Busiswa and many others.

=== Kwaito revolution ===
Kwaito is a music genre that was originally created in South Africa during the 1990s. It has been described as the music that defines the generation who came of age after apartheid. Oskido was amongst the first artists to produce kwaito tracks by adding vocals to the slow tempo house beats, and it went on to become popular in South Africa.But Oskido’s music could be differentiated from the rest of the Kwaito genre with its particular jazz elements. His co-creator, Don Laka, who’s a jazz maestro, gave their production a hybrid sound that set them apart from the rest. Oskido and his producing partners faced an avalanche of criticism from all quarters of the music industry for creating Kwaito. His contribution to the development of dance music in South Africa earned him a Special Recognition Award at the 2012 Channel O Music Video Awards.He was also part of the Kalawa Jazmee crew honoured at the SA Dance Music Awards in the same year.

=== House Music ===
Oskido is also known for his top selling ‘Church Grooves’ compilation series, which kicked off in 2001 and changed the face of South African house compilations, making them a staple in the industry for the next twenty years. In 2012 he launched the "I Believe" project, which is also the name of his radio show on Metro FM. This programme that was started with his Madlozi partner, Maloka, and the NYDA, and seeks to turn young music names into serious businessmen and women.

In the mid-2000s, along with Greg Maloka, DJ Fresh, Vinny Da Vinci and DJ Christos, he started DJU (Deejays Unite), and this crew was responsible for equipping young music names and DJs with valuable industry information through the annual Southern African Music Conference (SAMC). The conference lead to names like Black Coffee, DJ Tira, Euphonik and more breaking into the music industry and has opened doors for many others.

In the summer of 2019, he released a new album called ‘Akhiwe’, which paralleled his distinctive midtempo sound with the emerging amapiano genre. He collaborated with a number of artists on the album, including amapiano pioneers Kabza De Small and MFR Souls, and vocalists including Toshi (who was named Top Vocalist of 2018 by Traxsource), Monique Bingham, Winnie Khumalo, Zonke Dikana, and Tamara Dey, whose career Oskido helped kickstart when she sang on BOP’s "That'Impahlayakho".

These major names are joined by younger talent, including Drum Pope (who has collaborated with DJ Vetkuk vs Mahoota) and Mapiano, who worked on an early cut from this LP, "Balambile". The atmospheric "Ma Dlamini" features Kalawa alumni Professor.

Earlier in 2019, Mdlongwa shared a snap of his new restaurant, Daruma By Oskido Japanese Restaurant, in Waterfall Corner Johannesburg.

== Discography ==
=== Compilations ===
- Mixmaster Vol. 1 (1991–1994)
- Big Jam Vol. 1 & 2 (1993–1995)
- Brothers of Peace (with Christos and Don Laka) (1994)
- Brothers of Peace: Traffic Cop (1995)
- Brothers of Peace: King of Kwaito Uyagawula (1996)
- Oscar Warona: Mother Paka (1997)
- Brothers of Peace: Sphithiphithi (2000)
- Brothers of Peace: Project A (2001)
- Oscar Warona: Godzilla (2001)
- Church Grooves Vol. 1–10 (2001–2010)
- Brothers of Peace: Project B (2003)
- Brothers of Peace: Project C (Zabalaza – The Struggle) (2003)
- Brothers of Peace:Project D (2004)
- Oskido I Believe 2013 (2012)

Akhiwe (2020)

- Star Taxi
- Oscar Warona: The New Testament

=== Extended Play ===
- Keep the Faith (2020)
- Back to the Future (2021)

== See also ==
- List of South African musicians
