= Bernard Magubane =

Bernard Makhosezwe Magubane (26 August 1930–12 April 2013) was a South African academic and anti-apartheid activist. He taught at the University of Zambia from 1967 to 1970 and in the United States at the University of Connecticut for 27 years. Magubane contributed to South Africa's post-apartheid higher education landscape in his later years. Magubane was a trained sociologist who published seminal texts that continue to be referenced. He is the father of the academic Zine Magubane.

Magubane was the author of numerous highly cited academic publications exploring the relationships between imperialism, white-settler colonialism, and race and class in South Africa and the global system. He is an eminent scholar in the field of African Sociology. His PhD dissertation focused on African American Consciousness of Africa. This was the basis for his seminal work the award-winning book, The Ties That Bind published in 1987.

== Early life and education ==
Magubane was born 26 August 1930, to Xhegwana Elliot Magubane and Ella Magubane in Colenso, South Africa. His parents were labour tenants on a white-owned farm. He spent his early childhood here and in Cato Manor, Durban, where his parents resettled.

Magubane pursued teaching at the Mariannhill Teacher Training College, KwaZulu-Natal, then completed his Standard Ten at Sastri College in Durban. Following this, he received a fellowship to attend the University of Natal, which had sections for white and non-white students. Magubane gained three qualifications at the University of Natal. He studied towards a BA, an honours degree and then a master's degree in sociology. In 1961, he furthered his studies at the University of California, Los Angeles, where he attained a second master's degree (1963) and his PhD (1966).

== Teaching career ==
After his training, Magubane taught at Mariannhill. Following the introduction of the Bantu Education Act of 1953, Magubane and a number of colleagues resolved to discontinue their teaching careers. Magubane returned to academia as a postgraduate student during this period.

== Political activism ==
In 1979, Magubane published The Political Economy of Race and Class in South Africa which was banned in South Africa. Professor Magubane was the founder of the Connecticut anti-Apartheid movement which lobbied the state of Connecticut to divest from apartheid South Africa.

== Boards and Governance ==
- Chairperson of the Luthuli Museum in KwaDukuza
- Trustee for the heritage site Liliesleaf Farm in Rivonia
- Member of Advisory Council for Freedom Park

== Publications about Magubane ==
- Nyoka, B. 2016. Bernard Magubane's "The Making of a Racist State" Revisited: 20 Years On
- Reifer, T. (2020). Magubane, Bernard Makhosezwe (1930–2013). In: Ness, I., Cope, Z. (eds) The Palgrave Encyclopedia of Imperialism and Anti-Imperialism. Palgrave Macmillan, Cham.
- "Emeritus Professor of Anthropology Bernard Magubane Dies - UConn Today". today.uconn.edu. 18 April 2013.
- Tanyanyiwa, P. 2023. Transcending academic dependence: Bernard Magubane's contribution to the race and class debate in South Africa. INTERNATIONAL JOURNAL OF RESEARCH CULTURE SOCIETY
- Sociological Association of South Africa (https://sociology.africa/images/stories/Adesina_2013_Magubane_obituary.pdf)

== Publications ==
- Magubane, B, M. 1979. The Political Economy of Race and Class in South Africa. Africa World Press. (2nd ed). (978–0865430372)
- Magubane, B. 1987. Ties that Bind, The African-American Consciousness of Africa. Africa World Press.
- Magubane, B. 1996. The Making of a Racist State: British imperialism and the Union of South Africa, 1875–1910. Trenton: World Press.
- Magubane, B. 1999. African sociology: Towards a critical perspective. Trenton: Africa World Press.
- Magubane, B. 2001. Race and democratisation in South Africa: Some reflections. In Y. G. Muthien, M. M. Khosa, & B. Magubane (Eds.), Democracy and Governance Review: Mandela’s legacy, 94–99 (pp. 17–36). Pretoria: Human Sciences Research Council.
- Magubane, B. (2007). Race & the construction of the dispensable other. Scottsville: University of KwaZulu-Natal Press.
- Magubane, B. (2010). My life & times. Scottsville: University of KwaZulu-Natal Press.
- Magubane, B., Series ed., The road to democracy in South Africa, Volumes 1–6, South African Democracy Education Trust, various years. http://www.sadet.co.za/road_democracy.html

== Interviews ==
- "African Activist Archive". africanactivist.msu.edu.
