= Malaika (group) =

South African music group

Malaika is a South African Afro-pop music group, which has been described as post-mbaqanga and neo-soul. The group consists of musicians Bongani Nchang and the late Jabulani Ndaba (both born in Klerksdorp, South Africa), and Matshediso Mholo (born in Lichtenburg).

Malaika are probably best-known for their breakthrough hit "Destiny", and is considered among fans to be their signature song. The group toured Australia from 6–9 March 2008 with Australian Idol 2007 finalist Tarisai Vushe as the supporting act.

== Accolades ==
- Kora Awards Best Newcomer Group (2004) for Malaika and Best Southern Group (2005) for Vuthelani
- SAMA Most Popular Artists of the Year, and Most Popular Song of the Year
- 2005 Channel O Music Video Awards – Best Afro-Pop Group
- Metro FM Music Awards – Best Afro-Pop Album, Best Group, Best Album
- 2006 Channel O Music Video Awards – Best Duo or Group

== Discography ==
- Malaika (2003)
- Vuthelani (2005)
- Sekunjalo (2007)
- Mmatswale (2008)
