= DJ Tira =

South African record producer (born 1976)

- Born: Mthokozisi Khathi; 24 August 1976 (age 49); KwaHlabisa Village, KwaZulu-Natal, SA
- Genres: Durban Kwaito; Afro house; Gqom; 3-step; Afro tech
- Occupations: DJ; record producer; businessman
- Years active: 1997–present
- Label: Afrotainment
- Spouse: Gugu Khathi (m. 2013)
- Website: www.afrotainment.com

Mthokozisi Khathi (born 24 August 1976) popularly known as DJ Tira, is a South African DJ, record producer, and businessman.

== Early life ==
Khathi was born in KwaHlabisa Village, KwaZulu-Natal, and his family relocated to Durban in 1979. Khathi attended Mlokothwa High School and enrolled at the University of Natal now known as UKZN in 1995, studying human resources.

== Career ==
Khathi developed an interest in being a DJ while he was at university, when he started playing as a DJ in 1996. Around 2001, he released his first record named Real Makoya, which is a compilation album with DJ Khabzela. In 2005, he was signed a record deal with Kalawa Jazzmee. He formed a group named Tzozo En Professor and later formed Durbans Finest together with DJ Sox which also was under Kalawa Jazmee Records. Tira and Sox together released a series compilation albums named Durbans Finest.

In 2007, he launched his recording studio Afrotainment and signed DJ Cndo as the first artist on his record label. Since he was working at his own production, he became a music producer. Later the same year DJ Tira signed kwaito group Big Nuz after they relocated from Johannesburg to Durban. In 2008, DJ Tira as a featured artist appeared on two tracks on urban radio charts and music shops charts alongside of Big Nuz's "Ubala Lolo" and DJ Clock's "Mahamba Yedwa".

In 2008, he released his first solo project under his record label named Ezase Afro Vol:1. The album is supported by the guest appearance of Bricks, Daddy, Big Nuz and Joocy of Afrosoul. Ezase Afro Vol:1 became a hit album and sold more than 20 000 copies.

In March 2019, his single "Amachankura" featuring TNS was released as the lead single from an upcoming studio album. In July 2019, the second single "Thank You Mr DJ" featuring Joocy was released. Tira released Ikhenani on September 13, 2019. Ikhenani won Best Kwaito Album at the 26th ceremony of South African Music Awards.

On August 24, 2020, his fourth studio album 21 Years of DJ Tira was released in South Africa, celebrating a 21 years in music industry. The album was certified platinum by the Recording industry of South Africa (RiSA).

In March 2021, he co-hosted season 6 of the SABC 1 talent show competition, 1's and 2's.

On June 25, 2021, his fifth studio album Rockstar Forever was released in South Africa. The album features the Q Twins, Makhadzi, Western Boyz, Jumbo, Prince Bulo, Biza Wethu, Mampintsha, Joocy, Ntencane, Proffesor, Beast, Worst Behaviour, Dladla Mshunqisi, BlaQRythm, Mtebza & Khazozo. Rockstar Forever rank number 1 on iTunes charts South Africa.

== Personal life ==
DJ Tira is married to Gugu Khathi and they have one son and one daughter. DJ Tira and his wife hosted a Umabo (traditional Zulu ceremony) at his home in KwaHlabisa, KwaZulu-Natal.

== Discography ==
=== Studio albums ===
Title	Details	Certifications
Ezase Afro Vol:1	Released: 12 December 2013; Label: Afrotainment; Format: CD, digital download	
Ezase Afro Vol:2	Released: 2012; Label: Afrotainment; Format: CD, digital download	
Ikhenani	Released: 13 September 2019; Label: Afrotaiment; Format: digital download, CD	
21 Years of DJ Tira	Released: 24 August 2020; Label: Afrotaiment; Format: digital download	RiSA: Platinum
Rockstar Forever	Released: June 2021; Label: Afrotaiment; Format: digital download, streaming	
Malume Way	Released: 24 August 2023; Label: Afrotaiment; Format: digital download, streaming	

=== Compilation albums ===
Title	Details
Real Makoya (with DJ Khabzela)	Released: 2001; Format: CD
Durbans Finest Vol:1 (with Sox and Ncedo M)	Released: 2004; Format: CD
Durbans Finest Vol:2 (with Sox)	Released: 2005; Format: CD

=== As featured artist ===
List of singles as featured artist, with selected chart positions and certifications, showing year released and album name
Title	Year	Peak chart positions	Certifications	Album
Title	Year	ZA	Certifications	Album
"Gibela" (Xowla featuring DJ Tira)	2022	—	RiSA: Gold	Non-album single
"—" denotes a recording that did not chart or was not released in that territory.

== Awards and nominations ==
Year	Award	Prize	Nominee / work	Result	Ref.
2004	AMFMA	Best Compilation Album	Durbans Finest Vol:1	Won	
2018	DMASA	Best Live Act	Himself	Nominated	
2019	SAMA	Record of the Year	Himself	Nominated	
2020	26th SAMA	Best Kwaito/Gqom/Amapiano	Himself	Nominated	
2020	1st KZN Entertainment Awards	Special Achievement Award	Himself	Won	
2023	Metro FM Music Awards	Best Kwaito/Gqom Song	"Sikilidi"	Won	
2023	Metro FM Music Awards	Best Music Video	"Sikilidi"	Won	
