= Club Eden =

Club Eden was the first purpose-built, fully dedicated electronic dance music venue on the African continent. Located at 54 Waterkant Street in Cape Town, South Africa, the space was architecturally and conceptually designed exclusively around the emerging underground dance subcultures of the era.

Eden officially opened on Friday, 29 November 1990, running for a single season that introduced an entirely new electronic lifestyle and nightlife paradigm to the region. The venue was conceived, structured, and promoted by creative partners Jesse Stagg and Carl Mason alongside the UFO Collective and an independent syndicate of private investors.

Inspired directly by the United Kingdom's Second Summer of Love and the sonic evolution of acid house, Eden operated as a catalyst for early cross-cultural social re-integration during the twilight of the Apartheid regime, effectively laying down new structural and demographic templates for South Africa's post-apartheid club generation. The venue's programmatic introduction of European house and techno and industrial sounds into the regional landscape, helped lay the seeds and stylistic roots of what later evolved into modern indigenous electronic genres like contemporary South African house music and Amapiano.

== Global context and branding ==
The establishment of Club Eden predated the launch of prominent global electronic music institutions such as London's Ministry of Sound (September 1991) and Liverpool's Cream (October 1992). While other regional nightlife venues of the era typically featured electronic dance tracks as part of broader, multi-genre music formats, Eden was structured exclusively around an electronic music program. In doing so, it laid an early conceptual path for the highly focused branding, distinct iconographies, and marketing methodologies that international superclubs would later adopt to scale the genre globally.

Rather than operating as a conventional discotheque, Club Eden was marketed as a curated music and lifestyle venue. This approach utilized custom conceptual graphics, an industrial interior aesthetic featuring bespoke live video graphics generated on Amiga hardware, and structured membership systems. The "ESP Card"—standing for *Extremely Special People*—which served as a deliberate cultural rejection of the traditional, exclusionary "VIP" (Very Important Person) tier system common in mainstream nightlife.
