= Kwaito =

Subgenre of house music from South Africa

- Other names: D'gong
- Stylistic origins: House; marabi; disco; kwela; mbaqanga; jazz; maskandi; hip hop; township pop a.k.a. "bubblegum"
- Cultural origins: Late 1980s–1990s, South Africa
- Derivative forms: Afro house; African trap music (ATM); afro trap; gqom

Subgenres
- Durban kwaito; guz; kwai-jazz

Fusion genres
- Bacardi house; amapiano

Other topics
- Afro fusion; motswako; shangaan electro

Kwaito is a music genre that emerged in Soweto, Johannesburg, South Africa, between the late 1980s and 1990s. It is a sound that features the use of South African sounds and samples. Kwaito songs occur at a slower tempo range than other styles of house music and often contain catchy melodic and percussive loop samples, deep bass lines and vocals. They are also very similar tempos to early 1990s NYC house tracks.

== Etymology ==
The word kwaito originates from the South African slang "kwaai," which conveys the meaning of "cool" or "bad" in a positive context. The term "kwaai" itself is rooted in Afrikaans, where it initially signified "angry" or "fierce." However, within the framework of South African youth culture, its connotation had shifted to represent something fashionable or noteworthy.

Kwaito led a post-Apartheid township subculture into the mainstream despite the fact that the Afrikaans language is associated with the apartheid regime and racial oppression, Afrikaans words are often drawn into the Sabela and Tsotsitaal and Camtho vocabularies, reshaped and used in a related or new context. M'du Masilela, a pioneering kwaito artist, said, "When house music got popular, people from the ghetto called it Kwaito after the Afrikaans slang word kwai [sic], meaning those house tracks were hot, that they were kicking." An Isicamtho word derived from the Afrikaans word kwaai is amakwaitosi, which means gangster. Arthur Mafokate described the relationship between kwaito and gangsterism as music revolving around ghetto life.

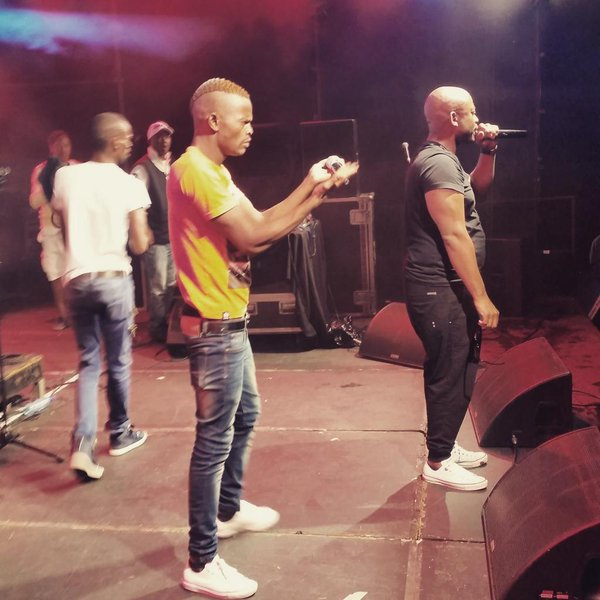
Mdu performing in 2016

== History ==
Kwaito evolved and emerged in South Africa as a distinct genre between the late 1980s and early 1990s, becoming prominent music within the post-apartheid cultural milieu. Schools in the townships were burdened by severe financial limitations and were unable to offer programs such as music classes that might have enriched students' educational experiences. During and shortly after the apartheid era, the South African education system was characterized by severe segregation and inequality. Schools in townships received scant resources and inadequate support in comparison to those in more affluent areas, further constraining educational opportunities for township students.

In this context, kwaito emerged as a genre that did not necessitate formal music theory, extensive rehearsal space, or costly instruments, thus proving particularly accessible to individuals in these disadvantaged communities. The genre's minimal barriers to entry enabled young people in the townships to engage with music and exercise their creativity, despite the constraints imposed by their educational and economic environments. Key figures in the early kwaito scene included Mdu Masilela (M'du), Mandla Mofokeng (Spikiri), Arthur Mafokate, Sandy B and groups such as MM Deluxe (M'du Masilela, Spikiri), Boom Shaka ( Lebo Mathosa, Theo Nhlengethwa, Thembi Seete), Trompies (Spikiri, Mahoota, Donald Duck, Jakarumba, Mjokes), B.O.P, TKZee (Tokollo Tshabalala, Kabelo Mabalane, Zwai Bala) and Bongo Maffin (Stone Seate, Jah Seed, Speedy, and Thandiswa Mazwai) whose contributions were instrumental in shaping both its musical and cultural identity. Kwaito required no formal knowledge of music theory, rehearsal spaces, or expensive instruments, making it easily accessible to individuals in disadvantaged communities.

Newfound freedom gave South African musicians easier access to international works and a greater ability to freely express themselves. As a result, kwaito has also been known as the expression of this new freedom, and many anti-apartheid chants have been used as lyrics for kwaito songs. Kwaito has been called the music that defines the generation who came of age after apartheid. A notable kwaito track titled "Kaffir" by Arthur Mafokate exemplified the freedom of expression that emerged with South Africa's political liberation. In the early 1990s, house music made its way to Cape Town through raves such as the World Peace Party and in iconic venues like Club Eden, followed by Euphoria and DV8. Concurrently, house music also began to influence Durban's nightlife scene. This musical movement then spread northward, gaining prominence in Johannesburg clubs like 4th World. Durban also made significant contributions. Sandy B's 1994 album AmaJovi Jovi was the first kwaito release from KwaZulu-Natal to achieve national success.

As kwaito attained mainstream prominence in South Africa, collaborations became increasingly prevalent, exemplified by the notable collaborations between South African R&B artists such as Danny K and, Mandoza. Kwaito hits frequently attracted significant media attention. Arthur Mafokate's August 2005 release, "Sika Lekhekhe" (a Zulu expression that translates literally to "cut this cake" and figuratively to "have sex with me") generated considerable controversy. The song was banned by the South African Broadcasting Corporation (SABC) radio station, and Mafokate was required to reshoot the song's music video in response to viewer complaints regarding its sexually suggestive content.

Similarly, Boom Shaka encountered substantial criticism from the political establishment for their interpretation of the national anthem with a kwaito beat. Although Johannesburg-based artists played a crucial role in the genre's emergence and popularization.

In the late 1990s and early 2000s, the kwaito industry witnessed swift expansion and escalated rivalry. Zola, Mandoza, Trompies, Mzekezeke, Brown Dash, Mahoota, Spikiri, Mzambiya, Chippa, Msawawa, Mshoza, Thembi Seete, Thandiswa Mazwai, Brickz, TKZee, Unathi, Brenda Fassie and Sbu Malawyah emerged as influential figures in South Africa, shaping the country's culture, language, and economy in ways that were unattainable during the era of government-imposed segregation under apartheid. TS, Ghetto Ruff, Kalawa Jazmee, Afrotainment and Bulldogs were the leading recording companies responsible for discovering kwaito artists. The South African talent show Jam Alley provided a significant platform for many emerging kwaito musicians, such as Mandoza, Mzambiya, and Zola.

== Characteristics ==
Kwaito is characterized by a slow tempo. The genre is distinguished by its prominent, synthesized bass lines and songs often features a funky, melodic quality. The drum patterns in kwaito are influenced by house music however are executed with a more relaxed approach. The genre prominently features drum machines and electronic percussion. Production techniques in kwaito frequently involve sampling from traditional South African music, hip-hop, and disco. The influence of Zulu music is particularly notable, with kwaito often incorporating traditional Zulu musical elements and rhythms. Vocals in kwaito are typically delivered in a conversational or narrative style. Lyrics are performed in various South African languages, such as Zulu, Sotho, and Afrikaans, and explore themes ranging from social and political commentary to personal experiences and celebratory subjects. Sometimes kwaito lyrics are explicit, reflecting the genre's engagement with real-life issues and experiences. Additionally, the use of Tsotsi Taal adds a layer of linguistic richness.

== Record producers and record sales ==
Producers who played a major role in the genre's evolution include M'du, Arthur Mafokate, Spikiri, Don Laka, Sandy B, Oskido, Rudeboy Paul, Dope, Sanza and Sello Chicco Twala. Spikiri, refined kwaito's signature sound by incorporating distinctive rhythms and local musical elements. Sello Chicco Twala, mentored several kwaito artists. Mdu Masilela also played a crucial role, known for his combination of melodic elements and rhythmic innovation. During the genre's inception, kwaito rapidly gained popularity in South Africa. Musicians such as Mandoza, Arthur Mafokate, and Boom Shaka achieved significant commercial success, earning platinum status and solidifying the genre's position in the South African music scene. During the 1990s and early 2000s, kwaito consistently topped local music charts, reflected in numerous gold and platinum certifications.

== Women in kwaito ==
Kwaito was initially a largely male-dominated music genre, in regards to the artists as well as the management. However, there were a number of female artists that managed to become quite successful. Brenda Fassie, a South African pop superstar, quickly adopted a kwaito style as it surged to popularity in the 1990s. According to Time, she was known both for her diva attitude and scandals involving sex and drugs, but also for lyrics that dealt with complex issues of African culture and life. Lebo Mathosa rose to fame as part of the group Boom Shaka, and later became a solo artist despite (or perhaps because of) being sometimes called South Africa's "wild child" because of her sexually explicit lyrics and dance moves, she gained widespread popularity, and performed at Nelson Mandela's 85th birthday celebration. Lebo Mathosa had performed alongside American superstar performers Will Smith and Missy Elliott and had also recorded a duet with R&B star Keith Sweat. Iyaya, formerly of group Abashante, was known for "taking raw, street sexuality to the stage". Goddess, Venus, Chocolate and Rasta Queen were the four members of the all-female kwaito group Ghetto Luv. They adopted an "in your face" sexual style; the cover of their first album You Ain't Gonna Get None displayed all four members completely naked.

During the emergence of the kwaito, Boom Shaka emerged as a voice for young women and a symbol of empowerment. They used sexuality as an expression and celebration of black women and the natural female sexual desires. Boom Shaka engaged in political activism by advocating for women's voices through their recording of a new South African anthem that emphasized women's capacity to effect societal change. Kwaito provided women with a novel form of agency for self-representation in post-apartheid South Africa. A CNN article considered Boom Shaka alongside TKZee the most influential kwaito groups in South African music. Boom Shaka's music gained popularity not only in South Africa but throughout Africa. The group's music represented the voice of young people who were often neglected by governments in post-colonial Africa

== Subgenres and styles ==
=== Durban Kwaito ===
Durban Kwaito (also kwaito house or Durban house) is a variant of kwaito that emerged in Durban between the 1990s and early 2000s. It originated before it had an official name and was influenced by more diverse house music styles than traditional kwaito. Durban kwaito began to take shape driven by a new wave of artists and producers preponderantly from Durban who infused traditional kwaito sounds with local drum rhythms and progressive production techniques. Key figures in the development of Durban kwaito include DJ Fisherman, Durban's Finest (DJ Tira and DJ Sox), Sandy B, DJ Tira, Big Nuz, L'vovo, DJ Cleo, Danger, Shana, Professor, Character, Tzozo, Sox, Zakes Bantwini, DJ Siyanda, NaakMusiQ, Unathi, DJ Cndo and DJ Bongz who were instrumental in popularizing the Durban kwaito sound, characterized by its incorporation of faster tempos, tribal house, deep house, electro and regional influences (such as associated musicians like DJ Tira who performed on the Spanish island of Ibiza known for its house music and rave scene for two years, 2000 and 2001). The isiZulu term Isgubhu refers to a drum or beat emitting from speakers, that became synonymous with Durban kwaito. Durban kwaito's sound influenced the development of bacardi house and later gqom. The word "gqom", which could be interpreted as "hitting drum" in the Zulu language later evolved into a distinct spinoff and subsequently birthed the subgenre, sgubhu (not to be confused with the term or Durban kwaito). Due to its significant influence on the gqom genre, Durban kwaito, is often conflated with or referred to as gqom.

==== Future Kwaito ====
Future Kwaito blends traditional kwaito with gqom, drone music, industrial music and traditional house music developed by Stiff Pap in the late 2010s.

=== Guz ===
TKZee's, "guz" sound exemplified a fusion of kwaito with hip-hop elements, signifying a significant evolution within the genre. It retained the quintessential kwaito rhythm and incorporated augmented 1990s hip hop influences through rap-style vocals. Guz demonstrated how kwaito had evolved over time, integrating elements of hip hop. Guz was noted as having appealed to a wider audience.

==== New Age Kwaito ====
New Age Kwaito incorporates hip hop with "kwaito classics", samples. It emerged mid-2017 and is attributed to Kwesta, Riky Rick, Spoek Mathambo, Okmalumkoolkat, Cassper Nyovest and K.O.

==== Skhanda Rap ====
Skhanda Rap blends elements of traditional kwaito with rapping. Skhanda rap began to take shape in the mid- 2010s. Artists include K.O, Ma-E, Maggz, Kid X and Moozlie. The album, Skhanda Republic, was pivotal in defining skhanda rap.

=== Kwai-jazz ===
Kwai-jazz (also kwaai jazz), is kwaito with jazz integrated elements developed by Don Laka in the 1980s.

== Political and social impact ==
Kwaito, which emerged during South Africa's transition from apartheid, exerted significant political influence. It served as a powerful form of expression and resistance, reflecting the social and political realities of the post-apartheid era. The genre addressed issues such as poverty, inequality, and urban experiences, deeply resonating with the struggles and aspirations of marginalized communities in South Africa. A scholar, Gavin Steingo, examined the political dimensions of kwaito and analyzed how the genre functioned as a vehicle for political commentary and social critique, arguing that its development and reception mirrored broader shifts in South African society, including changes in political consciousness and identity. Steingo's research highlighted how kwaito's lyrics and performances frequently engaged with themes of empowerment and resistance, underscoring its role as both a cultural and political force. Kwaito also faced political scrutiny and censorship as outlined by Arthur Mafokate and Boom Shaka's encountered criticism from political and social leaders due to their provocative content. Overall, the rise of kwaito and its impact on South African society demonstrated its significance not only as a musical genre but also as a medium for political expression and social commentary.

According to Rudeboy Paul, "Kwaito is a platform that serves to drive thoughts, ideas, gives kids from the township a voice in which to speak on what their concerns are, social ills happening around them, the fact that they can't find jobs out there, HIV and AIDS awareness as well."

== Performance and cultural significance ==
Livermon writes, "Kwaito bodies situate themselves within and through the space of the city [negotiating] complicated contexts of post-apartheid life. These seams of negotiation, of self-articulation and lived expression, come into creative tension in this ethnography..." Through this ethnographic performance, Kwaito positions itself as more than a music genre; Kwaito becomes a voice and physical movement expressing freedom for Black South Africans in the post-apartheid context. In the Freedom Sounds documentary, Thandiswa Mazwai discusses the re-introduction of South African youth into a public and performance zeitgeist. This publicity requires performers to "[illuminate] different aspect[s] of kwaito bodies, offering a way to read young Black bodies and their constitutive pleasures within narratives of power". Finding the awareness of one's power and authenticity through performance becomes radical. This idea of "being radical" is not because Kwaito dance explicitly speaks about the impact and overcoming of socio-political strife; instead, this radical ideology comes from a disruption that frees Black music, production, and performance from the perception of only having to require an explicit political message, instead valuing celebration, pleasure, and overcoming.

Kwaito's also considered innovative use of local languages, played a key role in shaping a new cultural identity for South Africans. The genre had a significant impact on South African fashion and lifestyle, closely tied to urban youth culture. It inspired styles and trends, such as casual streetwear and eclectic fashion choices. Beyond South Africa, kwaito garnered international attention.

== Criticism ==
The kwaito music industry has received some criticism for a lack of female representation among artists and producers. Lebo Mathosa, famous female kwaito artist and member of Boom Shaka, noted that it is "difficult, because every producer that you meet in our country is male. There isn't even one female producer that you could say 'OK, I like that record that is produced by so and so.'" Others accuse kwaito of being commercialised and mass-produced, and relying on over-sexualised lyrics and dances.

Being male-dominated, kwaito tends to misrepresent women in their lyrics by referencing the body and sexual images. Some kwaito groups like Trompies are using the image of the woman to make a social and political statement. In one of their music videos, there is a beauty contest and the women that win and get all the male attention are all on the heavier side. The group is trying to say that today's perception and definition of beauty does not have to adhere to other cultures' societal standards. Furthermore, more women are entering the kwaito music scene like artist Lesego Bile. She has claimed she enjoys the challenge of entered a male dominated music genre and uses her struggles from her past to help her stay true. She refuses to never exploit her body and dance sexually to please the crowd, like other female artists. She plans on making a strong statement for female artists, while commenting on social issues.

Kwaito has also been criticized as an African imitation of hip hop. In Thokozani Mhlambi's article "Kwaitofabulous", he points out various European scholars who have disclaimed the authenticity of hip hop as they believe it to undermine the cultural and historical struggles of the South African people because of Kwaito's similarity with American hip hop. Mhlambi, however, disclaims by pointing out that the Black youth of America and South Africa have faced similar oppressive histories by the white population, and thus makes sense to have its music similar as well. He also points out that the criticism from onlookers from other cultures do not realize how both kwaito and hip hop require performances and music making to be a group process and thus requires collaboration. He believes kwaito and hip hop to have many similarities due to both genre's origins; however, he does not believe kwaito to be a direct descendant of hip hop. Furthermore, many scholars and researchers of the genre, including Gavin Steingo, agree with Mhlambi in that they disclaim the idea that kwaito is purely South African hip hop. Steingo writes in an article titled "South African music after Apartheid: kwaito, the 'party politic,' and the appropriation of gold as a sign of success" that the genre was influenced by both house music and American hip hop, while also drawing on inspiration from ancient African music. Therefore, kwaito cannot be simply the South African version of hip hop. Also, Steingo writes that a version of hip hop music does already exist in the country, and it is not kwaito: "Because of seemingly obvious parallels between African American youth culture and the new Black South African youth culture, people have been inclined to think of kwaito as South African hip hop, or a South African version of hip hop (In 2000, Sterns/Earthworks released a kwaito compilation CD in the UK called Kwaito—South African Hip Hop). It would seem that this perceived familiarity is based primarily on the shared characteristic of rhyming in verse. And, though this is not totally invalid, it should be stated that there is a South African version of hip hop in South Africa and it is not (and has even come into conflict with) kwaito." Additionally, it is difficult to define Kwaito as a type of South African hip hop, as there is an actual emergent hip-hop scene. As kwaito, for the most part, remains apolitical, the hip hop scene, although less popular, generates a more political and gangster-esque style. This difference is described by the South African hip hop group Godessa, "Hip-hop is universal. We were excluded from Kwaito because we cannot understand it. To us, music is not just about dancing, it is a vehicle for us to speak to the masses." Similarly, hip hop is gaining popularity in Johannesburg, kwaito's stomping ground, and its emergence is fostering a rivalry of sorts, further separating the two genres. As Kwaito is more of a mixture of hip hop, disco, and house, the hip hop scene mirrors a more American style of hip-hop.

Despite this criticism, kwaito has played a prominent role in South African youth culture.

== Cultural context and implications ==
Kwaito is viewed as a cultural product of the societal norms and historical context of the townships of South Africa. It is both affected by Black South African society and influences the popular culture of Johannesburg, Cape Town, and their surrounding suburbs. Kwaito serves a transmitter of popular fashion, language, and attitude. Kwaito has also been adopted by mainstream advertisers and production companies as a means of addressing the masses and selling products. A combination of the popularity of Kwaito music and the search by transnational marketers for a means of addressing Soweto youth (considered to be popular cultures' trendsetters) has led to the use of Kwaito music as a method for advertising mainstream North American products.

Kwaito acts as a reference point for understanding the social situation and cultural norms of Soweto society. Many songs such as Bantwan by Bob Mabena, "whose lyrics marry consumerism and female objectification" or Isigaga by Prophets of Da City which "expresses the same negative and misogynistic attitudes.". Kwaito also addresses the oppression of black people and the context of colonialism in which they still live. Songs such as Arthur Mafokate's song 'Kaffir' addresses the prevalence of direct racism and Zola's song Mblwembe (problem child) reflects the prevalence of crime in the townships serve as a means of social dialogue. A third way in which a specific aspect black South African Society is reflected by Kwaito is in the dancehall nature of its origins and rhythms. It shows the prevalence of the dancehall in the impoverished townships and flat lands and illustrates the importance of the dancehall as a cultural meeting place. South African Kwaito enthusiast Nhlanhla Sibongile Mafu best articulated the balance between social commentary and recreation when he said, "dancing itself becomes the site for a radical rejection of the traditional struggle lyrics in favour of the liberation of pleasure, while at the same time attempting to use the language of the street to grapple with and articulate the present reality for the man and woman in the streets of the ghetto".

It is said that " ...a repressive society would result in a creative art...it is an ingredient, it acts as a catalyst to a man who is committed." In 1994 apartheid ended in South Africa. Kwaito music in South Africa became a symbol of the new generation of youth; furthermore it was not just music, but it stood for a way of life and associated with it was a way of talk, dance, and dress. Kwaito reflects township life for South African youth, similar to how American hip hop portrays life in U.S. inner cities. This type of music seems to be the newly unsilenced voice of the people speaking out freely in their society.

Kwaito has been compared to international genres such as Jamaican dancehall and UK grime. Dancehall was founded in the 1950s and '60s right when Jamaicans were trying to gain independence from the British. Similarly Kwaito was formed right after the apartheid was lifted in South Africa, both by young members of the lower class. Additionally both have "taken cues from the trends of new governments that supposedly gave rise to the advancement of personal wealth, and glamorized lifestyles." They also share a number of themes in common including commentary on violence and crime, AIDS awareness, and women's safety.

The commonalities between dancehall and Kwaito are in fact rooted in a deeper relationship between South Africa and Jamaican music. African reggae artists like Côte d'Ivoire's Alpha Blondy and South Africa's own Lucky Dube were popular throughout the continent during apartheid, and Alpha helped shed a negative light on the oppressive regime when he compared apartheid to Nazism. Many currently renowned Kwaito musicians grew up listening to Jamaican music, and Stoan, a member of Bongo Maffin, explained in an interview just how necessary an outlet this kind of music was: the representations of black people imported into the country during apartheid were singularly negative ones, and Jamaican music was one of the few imported forms that celebrated blackness and gave ghettoized black youth in South Africa something to embrace and identify with. As he describes it,

"If we had to look at any other example of black people off the continent who have found their essence, it's Jamaicans. For us, for South Africans after the curtain was lifted, after we could see other things besides what was presented to us on television which was blacksploitation [sic.] movies and stuff like that, buffoons, you know the picture of us. Any other picture of a successful black man was him behaving like a caricature of himself. Jamaicans brought another element to a picture we had of us as an out of body experience. Yeah, so I think you'll find that a lot of people, you know, have been touched by the culture, in South Africa, within 10 years."

== Dances ==
Kwaito is more than just a music genre. A CNN article described kwaito as a whole subculture with a swirl of irresistible dance beats. According to Sonjah Stanley-Niaah in her article "Mapping Black Atlantic Performance Geographies: From Slave Ship to Ghetto," dancing has given kwaito increased appeal. In South Africa, beginning in the 1950s, people went to shebeens to listen to music, dance, and socialize on the weekends. The dancing girls at the parties, often hosted in houses as opposed to licensed clubs, served as a motivation for men to attend. As kwaito emerged and became the norm of music in the shebeens, its popularity rapidly increased. Boom Shaka, the first kwaito group, was also the first to create and popularize dance moves to accompany kwaito. The dances were said to offer a window into the everyday life of South Africans by building on traditional dance styles from the region. New dance style had also led to discussion over gender relations.

Pantsula is a male-dominated dance that came about in the 1980s representing the lower class culture. The dance includes synchronized movements by large groups of male dancers. "Mapantsula" is the title of a 1988 film describing the anti-apartheid struggle in South Africa. It was the first anti-apartheid film relating to black South Africans.

== Kwaito and globalization ==
The homogenization of kwaito with American rap music, due to globalization, was viewed by kwaito artists as a threat to the preservation of their local South African music credibility. Thus, kwaito artists focused on maintaining an emotional link between the customer and brand. Transnational corporations were much less interested in homogenizing or Americanizing kwaito music because true kwaito represented and dictated the South African experience. Americanizing kwaito, as was in many artists' opinions, would dilute the substance kwaito was originally based on.
