= Zine Magubane =

American sociologist

Zine Magubane is a scholar whose work focuses broadly on the intersections of gender, sexuality, race, and post-colonial studies in the United States and Southern Africa. She has held professorial positions at various academic institutions in the United States and South Africa and has published several articles and books.

== Early life and education ==
Magubane's father, Bernard Magubane, was a prominent South African scholar and one of the leading anti-apartheid activists based in the United States.

Magubane received her undergraduate degree in politics at Princeton University, and obtained a master's degree and Ph.D. degree in sociology from Harvard.

== Career ==
Magubane began her career as a lecturer in the Department of Sociology at the University of Cape Town. After a brief hiatus to do research with the Human Sciences Research Council in Pretoria, South Africa, Magubane returned to teaching. She served as an associate professor of Sociology and African Studies at the University of Illinois at Urbana-Champaign before her current position as a professor of sociology at Boston College. In 2015, Magubane returned to the University of Cape Town when she accepted a six-month visiting professorship through the Van Zyl Slabbert Chair.

== Academic work and publications ==
Magubane's work addresses intersections of gender, sexuality, race, and post-colonial studies.

=== Books ===
Magubane is the author of Bringing the Empire Home: Race, Class, and Gender in Britain and Colonial South Africa, which explores colonial conceptions of blackness across England and South Africa and how these representations continue to influence ideas of race, gender, and class today. She is the co-editor of Hear Our Voices: Race Gender and the Status of Black South African Women in the Academy, a book that highlights the institutional racism and sexism within the academy in South Africa. Magubane is also the editor of Postmodernism, Postcoloniality, and African Studies, an interdisciplinary collection of essays by scholars around the world that addresses race, gender, and identity.

=== Articles ===
Magubane has published various articles in various publications since she began her academic career in 1994. Her most cited article is "Which bodies matter? Feminism, poststructuralism, race, and the curious theoretical odyssey of the 'Hottentot Venus,'" which seeks to expose colonial representations of black women as a social construction rather than a biological fact. Magubane is also the author of "The (Product) Red Man’s Burden: Charity, Celebrity, and the Contradictions of Coevalness" in which she uses the concept of 'coevalness' to analyze Western, specifically celebrity, involvement in the Product Red campaign. Other commonly cited articles by Magubane include "The Revolution Betrayed? Globalization, Neoliberalism, and the Post-Apartheid State," "Globalization and the South African Transformation: The Impact on Social Policy," and "Spectacles and Scholarship: Caster Semenya, Intersex Studies, and the Problem of Race in Feminist Theory."
