= Bucie =

South African R&B and house singer

- Born: Busisiwe Nolubabalo Nqwiliso; 10 March 1987 (age 39)
- Education: Central Johannesburg College
- Occupations: singer-songwriter; vocalist
- Spouse: Nhlanhla Nkomo (m. 2016–2024)
- Children: 2
- Musical career
- Origin: Kimberley, South Africa
- Genres: House, Afro house
- Years active: 2007–2018
- Label: Demor Music (former)

Busisiwe Nolubabalo Nqwiliso (born March 10, 1987) is a South African R&B and house singer. Her 2014 single titled "Easy to Love" peaked at number 9 on EMA.

== Early life and career ==
=== Early life ===
She was born in Kimberley and grew up in Khuma where she led the choir at her parents' church.

=== Early career ===
In 2007, while she was enrolled at the Central Johannesburg College, her music lecturer, Thandukwazi Demor Sikhosana, recruited her to his newly formed label Demor Music.

== Career ==
Thandukwazi Demor Sikhosana wrote, produced and released her first local hit song "Ngicelindoda" taken from a Demor produced full-length album rockstar in 2007. Demor orchestrated her collaboration with Black Coffee in the single "Turn Me On" which was released and licensed to German label Gogo Music in 2007, with remixes by producers like Ralf Gum; the song became a No. 1 single on Traxsource.

In 2009 she collaborated with Black Coffee on the single "Superman". Later in 2017, Drake sampled the song on "Get it together", featuring Black Coffee and Jorja Smith. 2010 saw Demor Music collaborating with Soulistic Music once more as Bucie and Black Coffee collaborated again on "Superman", which topped the charts, and earned the duo award nominations such as SAMA, MTV BASE, METRO and 2011 Winter Music Conference Awards (Miami).

In June 2021, at the 6th Mzansi Kwaito and House Music Awards was nominated for Best Female Artist.

== Personal life ==
She gave birth to her first child (Xolani) at the age of 18. She gave birth to her second baby (Aphiwe) prematurely and though it was a scary time her husband's support was everything to her. Bucie was married to a Zimbabwean chartered accountant named Nhlanhla Nkomo. Nhlanhla paid lobola for Bucie in December 2016.

== Awards ==
=== Dance Music Awards South Africa ===
Year	Nominee / work	Award	Result	Ref.
2019	Herself	Best Female Vocalist	Nominated	

== Discography ==
=== Studio albums ===
- Rockstar (2007)
- Turn Me On (2008)
- Princess of House (2011)
- Princess of House (Easy To Love) (2014)
- Rebirth (2018)

=== Singles and EPs ===
- "Ngicelindoda"- 2007 - Demor Music
- "Your Kiss" - 2009 - Demor Music
- "He Is The Man" - 2009 - Demor Music
- "Your Kiss" - 2009 - Gogo Music
- "Turn Me On" - 2009 - Gogo Music
- "Superman" - 2010 - Jellybean Soul
- "Not Fade" - 2012 - Foliage Music
- "Get Over It" - 2012 - Foliage Music
- "Easy To Love" - 2014 - Demor Music
- "Rejoice (feat. Black Motion)" - 2016
- "Inde" by Heavy K - 2017
- "Angeke" by DJ Maphorisa & Abathakathi - 2017 - Blaqboy Music
- "Love Me Right (feat. Mobi Dixon) " - 2017
- "Ntombi", by Naakmusiq - 2018
- "Soz'Uphinde (feat. Mpumi)" - 2018
- "Thando Lwethu (feat. Kwesta)" - 2019 - RapLyf

=== Guest appearances ===
List of non-single guest appearances, with other performing artists, showing year released and album name
Title	Year	Other artist(s)	Album
"She Loves Me"	2014	Cassper Nyovest	Tsholofelo
"All For Love"	2017	Wizkid	Sounds from the Other Side
"Ntswempu"	2017	D'Banj and Busiswa	King Don Come
