= DJ Cleo =

South African DJ and Record producer

- Also known as: M.R. Es'Khaleni
- Born: Tlou Cleopas Monyepao; 24 December 1979 (age 46); Vosloorus, Gauteng, South Africa
- Origin: Johannesburg
- Genres: House; Kwaito; Hip hop; Amapiano
- Occupations: DJ; Record producer; Songwriter
- Years active: 2002–present
- Label: Will of Steel Productions
- Website: www.djcleo.co.za

Tlou Cleopas Monyepao (born 24 December 1979), professionally known as DJ Cleo, is a South African Kwaito, House music and Hip hop producer. He was born in Gauteng. DJ Cleo has enjoyed a long and fruitful career in the South African music industry, he produced successful singles and albums for various artists before going on to produce and release his debut album "Es'khaleni" in 2004. His 2012 Single "Facebook" earned him three awards at 18th SAMA. His eleventh album Eskhaleni 11 (2019), which include single "Yile Gqom" and Yile Piano, Vol. 1 (2019).

== Life and career ==
=== Early life ===
Tlou Cleopas Monyepao was born in Vosloorus, Gauteng, South Africa. Monyepao attended Springs Boys High School. With help of Hilde Buhr he developed his creativity reconnection so he started making music.

=== Career ===
He began his career as a producer of the Unrestricted Breakfast Show hosted by DJ Fresh on YFM. Cleo found himself enjoying producing for radio and soon started exploring producing music for himself and others.

His debut recording was "Will of Steel", which featured on DJ Glen Lewis/DJ Fresh's Gatecrasher double CD compilation. He remixed Bucy Rhadebe single "Uzugcin’ Impilo Yam", originally released in 2020.

=== Television ===
He was a producer of the e.tv soapie Rhythm City (TV series). In 2013, he was the co-host alongside Angie Khumalo of documentary reality show Vaya Mzansi season 1 on SABC 1. Cleo competed on Lip Sync Battle Africa - Season 2. He performed live on Idols South Africa - Season 17.

== Discography ==
=== Studio albums ===
- Es'khaleni (2004)
- Es'khaleni Ext. 2 (2005)
- Es'khaleni Zone 3 (2006)
- Es'khaleni Phase 4 (2007)
- Es'khaleni Unit 5 (2008)
- Es'khaleni 6 (2009)
- Es'khaleni 7 (2010)
- Cassanova Vol. 1 (2011)
- Es'khaleni Ext.2 (2013)
- Disclosure (2014)
- Es'khaleni 11 (2019)
- Yile Piano, Vol. 1 (2021)

== Awards and nominations ==
Year	Award ceremony	Prize	Work/Recipient	Result	Ref.
2008	14th SAMA	Urban Dance	Es'khaleni Phase 4	Won	
2008	MTV Africa Music Awards 2008	Best Male Artist of the Year		Nominated	
2012	18th SAMA	Best-Selling True-Tone Download of the Year	"Facebook"	Won	
2012	18th SAMA	Best-Selling Ring-Tone	"Facebook"	Won	
2012	18th SAMA	MTN Best-Selling Mobile Music Download	"Facebook"	Won	
2021	Mzansi Kwaito and House Music Awards	Best DJ		Won	
