= Boom Shaka =

South African Kwaito Music Group

- Origin: Johannesburg, Gauteng
- Genres: Kwaito, South African hip hop
- Years active: 1993–2004
- Label: Kalawa Jazmee Records • Universal Music Group
- Past members: Lebo Mathosa; Thembi Seete; Theo Nhlengethwa; Junior Sokhela

Boom Shaka was a South African kwaito vocal group consisting of Junior Sokhela, Lebo Mathosa, Theo Nhlengethwa, and Thembi Seete. They released their first single "It's About Time" in 1993 and their debut album Kwere Kwere in 1994. Boom Shaka was one of the most successful South African groups of the mid-1990s, and their music has been described as an inspiration for young people in the newly democratic South Africa. The group was viewed as representing "the hopes and dreams of a people after liberation." The group also gained international notice in England and other nations.

== History ==
South African music producer Don Laka set up his own record label to support the nation's music scene, and then in 1993 put together a group consisting of rappers Junior Sokhela and Theo Nhlengethwa, with some members of the rap ensemble Prophets of Da City. This group's combination of sounds from American hip hop, electronic dance music, and traditional South African styles was later acknowledged as the beginning of the kwaito genre. Sokhela also introduced the political focus and ghetto aesthetics of Jamaican music.

The group evolved into Boom Shaka with additional members selected by Laka. This process of forming a group from handpicked vocalists selected by a producer has also become common in kwaito music. The name Boom Shaka is a reference to the 19th century Zulu king Shaka. Singers Lebo Mathosa and Thembi Seete, both still teenagers, joined by 1994. Boom Shaka coalesced with Mathosa and Seete as lead singers, with Sohhela and Nhlengethwa performing as rappers and DJs.

Boom Shaka quickly became an inspiration for young black South Africans and their political ideologies in the years after the fall of the Apartheid regime. The group has been acknowledged as a pioneer of musical techniques and politically pointed dance routines that have since become common in the kwaito genre. The group was first signed to the kwaito-oriented Kalawa Jazmee Records but left in 1998 due to a royalty dispute. Unable to find a fully supportive record label, they decided to release future albums themselves in conjunction with a publishing deal with PolyGram Records. This allowed Boom Shaka to retain a considerable percentage of their earnings and copyright owenrship, in another pioneering move that has influenced subsequent black South African musicians.

After five albums released between 1994 and 1999, Boom Shaka broke up when Lebo Mathosa departed for a solo career in 2000.

== Controversies ==
During the group's most successful period, female singers Lebo Mathosa and Thembi Seete were often depicted in revealing clothes, leading to some charges of sexualization and objectification of black South African women. The singers countered that their music was intended to be a liberating force, with Mathosa claiming in interviews that her performances were intended both to empower herself financially and to challenge gender norms at the time. Conversely, many listeners found the discrepancy between the group's political lyrics and their visual image (including the hip hop-inspired fashions worn by Sokhela and Nhlengethwa) difficult to reconcile.

Boom Shaka aroused controversy in 1997 by performing a kwaito version of the South African national anthem "Nkosi Sikelel' iAfrika" at the South African Music Awards. The revealing outfits and suggestive dancing displayed by Mathosa and Seete while singing the anthem garnered widley divided reactions in the South African media. For example, journalist Vukile Pokwane described the performance as free from male-dominated stereotypes, though "the group executed the anthem with supple energy coupled with flexible choreography, leaving those with stiffer waists aghast." The Mail & Guardian said of the performance: "Stylishly clad in the deepest of blue velvet suits over lacy bras and flimsy white blouses held in place by at least one button — Boom Shaka's Thembi and Lebo had walked slowly to the front of the large Civic Theatre Stage and then stopped, each raising a clenched fist in the air. A pounding beat kicked in, sending a wave of motion down the girl's bodies."

The group addressed the controversy in the media, with Sokhela stating: "It's a little bit of a misunderstanding. We're not dissing anything, this is our own version; one for the young people. [...] Our parents know the lyrics to that song, but a lot of kids don't, even though they stand at school and hear it sung every morning. Young people's reaction to our version of the song has been incredible, they love it. And this way they'll learn the lyrics too." As an indication of the group's influence on South African politics and culture, the 1997 national anthem controversy has been the subject of academic analysis. Xavier Livermon wrote in his book Kwaito Bodies: Remastering Space and Subjectivity in Post-Apartheid South Africa (2020) that "through their performance, Boom Shaka insisted that the state be enacted more inclusively, pushing against its heteropatriarchal formation. [...] Hence, the aural register of Boom Shaka's version of 'Nkosi' refuses to dwell in the moment of triumph through liberation and instead begins to ask questions about the practices of freedom. Boom Shaka's performance asks difficult questions about exactly whose interests the new post-apartheid state will serve."

== Discography ==
- Kwere Kwere (1994)
- It's Our Game (No Need To Claim) (1996)
- Aint No Stoppin' (Us Now) (1998)
- Words of Wisdom (1998)
- Boom Shaka (1999)
