= Ernie Smith (jazz musician) =

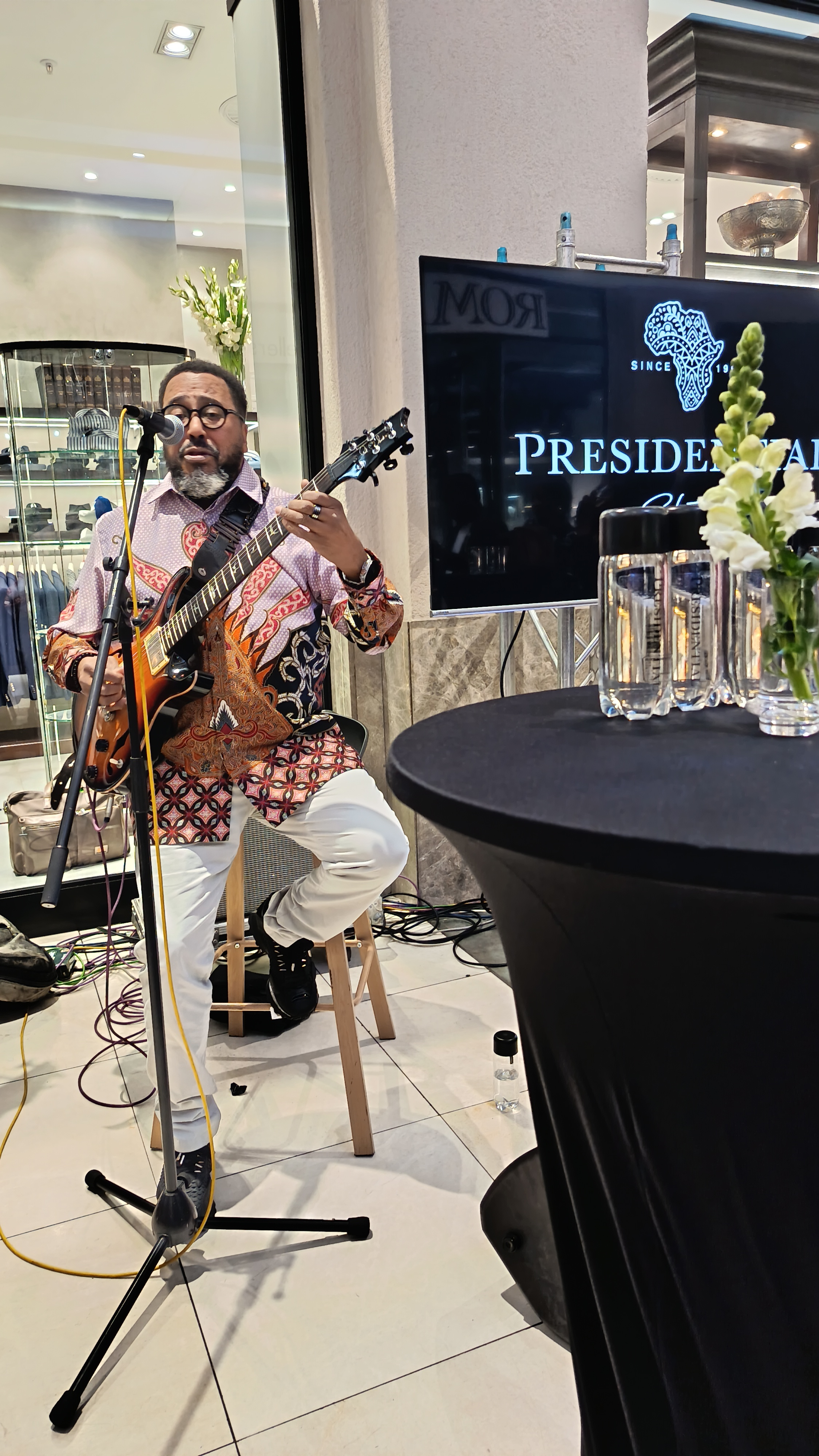

Background information
- Born: Ernest John Smith; March 29, 1971 (age 55); Wentworth, Durban, KwaZulu-Natal, South Africa
- Origin: Durban, South Africa
- Genres: Smooth jazz, African jazz, contemporary jazz, R&B, gospel
- Occupations: Guitarist, singer, songwriter, record producer
- Instruments: Guitar, vocals
- Years active: 1990s–present

Ernest John "Ernie" Smith (born 29 March 1971) is a South African guitarist, singer, songwriter and record producer. Smith first came to national attention with the release of his debut album, Child of the Light (2001), which earned him recognition at the South African Music Awards (SAMAs). His music blends contemporary jazz, R&B, gospel, and African musical influences.

== Early life ==
Smith was born in Wentworth, Durban, KwaZulu-Natal province of South Africa. He began playing the guitar as a teenager after becoming involved in church music. Before launching his solo career, he worked as a session musician and performed with artists including Hugh Masekela, Pops Mohamed and the gospel group Joyous Celebration.

== Career ==
Smith released his debut album, Child of the Light, through Sheer Sound record label in 2001. The album combined jazz, gospel, and rhythm and blues influences and included the single "Lonely". It featured guest appearances by Gloria Bosman, Themba Mkhize, Paul Hanmer and Marcus Wyatt.The album received two South African Music Awards, including Best Newcomer and Best Adult Contemporary Album, and Smith also received a Kora All Africa Music Award for Most Promising Male Artist.

His second album, Lovely Things, was released in 2002 and was followed by My African Heart in 2005. Throughout his career, Smith has collaborated with South African and international musicians, including Jonathan Butler, Kirk Whalum and Sipho Gumede.

In addition to performing, Smith has worked as a producer and has served in leadership roles within the South African music industry. In 2022 he established Child of the Light Records and New Dimension Music in Amanzimtoti, in KwaZulu-Natal.

In 2025 Smith released a single titled "Heya" .

== Discography ==
=== Studio albums ===
- Child of the Light (2001)
- Lovely Things (2002)
- My African Heart (2005)
- Everything Around Me (2007)
- Blessed Man (2009)

== Awards ==
Year	Award	Category	Result
2002	South African Music Awards 8	Best Newcomer (Artist or Group)	Won
2002	South African Music Awards 8	Best Adult Contemporary Album: English	Won
2002	Kora All Africa Music Awards	Most Promising Male Artist	Won
2003	Metro FM Music Awards	Best Jazz Artist	Won
2003	South African Music Awards 9	Best Adult Contemporary Album:English	Won
