= Revolution (duo) =

Music group

- Origin: Johannesburg, South Africa
- Genres: House, tribal house, afro house
- Years active: 1999–present
- Label: Four Sounds Productions
- Members: George Mothiba; Joseph Mothiba

Revolution is a house band formed in Johannesburg, South Africa, consisting of twin brothers George and Joseph Mothiba. They emerged into the spotlight with the release of their third album The Journey in 2002, supported by the hit single Vhavenda, it was recognised as the Best Selling Release at the 2003 South African Music Awards. Since then, they have released a further twelve albums at a rate of close to one per year, achieving some degree of commercial and critical success.

== Career ==
=== Early life and career ===
George and Joseph Mothiba were born in Alexandra township in Johannesburg, South Africa. They also have two elder sisters and describe their family, which is said to have Limpopo roots, as "simple".

The brothers first started dabbling in music at the age of 17. Initially they experimented with computers, "playing around" with sounds and pursuing DJing as a hobby. They would take their uncle's radio cassettes whilst washing his car then play them at friends parties. At one such party they met Big Oscar (better known as Oskido), a more established DJ. They went up to him for advice on DJing as he was able to mix with vinyls instead of tapes, they casually frequented him for a year and half afterwards. While searching for vinyls to mix with, they met DJ Christos as he owned one of the few record shops selling vinyls. Impressed by their interest in music and seeing them regularly come by his shop he asked them to open for him when going on gigs. Having been introduced to the world of professional music in 1999, Revolution released their first album in 2000.

=== 2002–2004: Breakthrough success ===
Their 2002 remix of guitar player Phillip Tabane's song Vhavenda started on the wrong note. They had used their mother's vinyls to craft the song without asking for Tabane's permission, he at first threatened to sue them but allegedly relented after listening to – and appreciating – the song. This bluster ultimately proved successful as the song, and its accompanying album The Journey, introduced them to a wider public, it reportedly went double platinum within three months of its launch, ultimately selling over 400,000 copies. It also earned the group awards such as the Metro FM award for Best Club DJ, and the South African Music Awards (Sama) award for Best Selling Release.

The brothers released The Journey Continues, their fourth album (after The Journey and their previous releases Revolution 1 and Revolution 2), in September 2003. Featuring popular tracks such as Zim Connection, a collaboration with Zimbabwean jazz musician Andy Brown, it also went double platinum, selling more than 100,000 copies by February 2004. It would garner them further acclaim, including another Metro FM award for Best Club DJ in 2004, and another Sama the same year, this time for Best Dance Album.

=== 2004–2009: Fifth album and further recognition ===
Another Level, their fifth album, which was released in 2004, saw the DJ's team up with a number of collaborators including Jazz stalwarts McCoy Mrubata, Pops Mohammed and Jimmy Dludlu to create a fusion of house and Jazz that made the latter more accessible to young fans The album proved another commercial success, going over triple-platinum in units sold, whilst it also brought Revolution four nominations for the 2005 Sama's; Best Dance Album, Artist of the Year, Song of the Year (for The Anthem) and Best Group or Duo, winning the latter.

For 2005 album Roots the duo enlisted the services of actress (notably appearing in Muvhango) and singer Maduvha, who they also signed to their record label Four Sounds Productions, penning the song Light of My Life. It was nominated for Best Popular Song of the Year at the 2006 Sama's while Revolution received their second successive nomination for Best Duo or Group though they didn't win either.

Revolution's 2006 album 4 u contained Feel the Music, a collaboration with former Boom Shaka member Theo Nhlengethwa who also signed up to their label, releasing the album Ngiyabonga, written and produced by the Mothiba brothers, in 2007. Later in 2007, Revolution were again nominated for a Sama award, for Best Urban Dance Album, while their protégée Maduvha's eponymous album (also produced by them) received a nod for Best Female Artist though they both lost.

The Book of Revolution, their ninth album came out in 2008 (Fusion was released the year before). Featuring eclectic partnerships with artists such as Antonio Lyons and Don Laka it was described as a "proudly Pan African fruit cocktail of stunning soul vocals, kwaai jazz grooves, glorious gospel anthems, fly slam poetic raps, and authentic maskandi filters" by critic Miles Keylock in a laudative review.

=== 2009–2015 ===
Revolution celebrated a decade of musical activity in 2009 with the release of Revolution 10, a double disk release with side one containing new songs such as Without You featuring Daddy and side two a compilation of their previous hits. Containing the song Iggys House (with Antonio Lyons), they dedicated the album to the late Iggy Smallz, a DJ who they counted as a friend.

An eleventh album, Tribal Journey, was released in 2010, featuring vocals from the likes of former Joyous Celebration gospel singer Thabo Mdluli and Senegalese singer Moh Dediouf, it was described as "an uplifting tribute to the rich and complex web of musical expression which binds all Africans across the globe".

Continuing on this "experimental tribal house" theme as labelled by a critic, the duo's next offering Meropa came out in 2011. Led by the popular single Teka Munike – a Portuguese language song with Rubygold – and producing credits ranging from Jazz great Themba Mkhize to car mechanic Randy it was well received by critics.

Evolution, their twelfth album in as many years, came out in 2012. Featuring rising stars such as Donald and Moneoa, it reintroduced them to award recognition, earning them two (ultimately unfruitful) nominations at the 2013 Metro FM awards (for Best Dance Album and Best Group Album).

The following year, in 2013, the brothers released a follow-up album, Evolution Delux, stating that "the idea behind this album is to take you around the world from Lana Del Rey to Nigeria" as it ranged from a tribal remix of Del Rey's Young and Beautiful to the song Jola with Senegalese singer Ndeye in the scarcely spoken Jola language. Their song Noqatiko, produced in partnership with fellow house producers Black Motion and singer Yasira, received a nomination for Best collaboration at the 2014 Metro FM awards.

=== 2015–present ===
Revolution reached the 15 album mark with the release of Moribo in 2015, the title comes from the Northern Sotho word for rhythm. it contains features from a diverse array of musicians from the late Andy Brown and Kelly Petlane (both of whom they had worked with previously) to "newer artists" like Msaki on the single Springtide. Critics described Moribo as "a soulful, remarkable and eclectic album" with a "strong […] African touch", with the group claiming to have produced an album that "caters for all markets and age groups".

== Personal lives ==
Identical twins, the Mothiba brothers claim to be "alike in every way" and to enjoy the same things such as technology and music; conversely, neither of them smokes or drinks. Furthermore, they also see themselves as best friends who are always together, as of November 2009 they were living together.

In contrast to others in the South African musical scene, they keep a low profile, with Joseph saying that "being all over the place, trying to impress people does more harm than good". They credit entertainment figures such as Ghetto Ruff founder Lance Stehr or Selimathunzi producer Baby Joe for instilling in them the notion that their "industry is not about the glitz and the glamour" but rather culture and specially South African music.

== Approach to music making ==
The name Revolution was chosen after lengthy brainstorming, with the idea that they "were going to do different music".

They name artists such as Jimmy Dludlu, Oliver Mtukudzi and Jay Hlungwani as influences, adding "if the music is good and the artist or DJ is good we will get inspiration from that" whatever the genre. On a similar note, they have worked with a number of musicians from other African countries to create "an African sound" in a slew of languages, claiming they "don't care about the languages they sing in, because the music will still be captured".

Owning both their own recording studio and company (Four Sounds Productions), they have complete artistic control over their output, producing all their songs and managing themselves, and also owning their own video production equipment and company for their music videos. They call reconciling both aspects "difficult" as their artistic side strives to write the perfect song whilst their business side wants them to release the track quicker and use less instruments.

To explain their staying power, they point out to their "distinct support base who follow our music all the time", and whose feedback they take on board to craft their sound. This strong fan base declaredly allows them to avoid rushing for commercial success and experiment with different sounds. Similarly, this connection to the mainstream public is said to help them "keep in touch, as does deejaying around the SADC region" which means they are able to notice recent trends before the rest of the industry catches up.

== Discography ==
=== Albums ===
Title	Album details
Revolution 1	Released: 2000
Revolution 2	Released: 2001
The Journey	Released: 21 June 2002; Label: Universal Music South Africa
The Journey Continues	Released: 18 September 2003; Label: Universal Music South Africa
Another Level	Released: 19 October 2004; Label: Universal Music South Africa
Roots	Released: 10 November 2005; Label: Universal Music South Africa
4 u	Released: 23 October 2006; Label: Universal Music South Africa
Fusion	Released: 26 October 2007; Label: Universal Music South Africa
The Book of Revolution	Released: 17 October 2008; Label: Universal Music South Africa
Revolution 10	Released: 22 October 2009; Label: Universal Music South Africa
Tribal Journey	Released: 7 October 2010; Label: Universal Music South Africa
Meropa	Released: 29 September 2011; Label: Universal Music South Africa
Evolution	Released: 12 November 2012; Label: Universal Music South Africa
Evolution Delux	Released: 23 October 2013; Label: Universal Music South Africa
Moribo	Released: 9 October 2015; Label: Universal Music
Moshito	Released: 24 November 2017; Label: Universal Music

== Awards and nominations ==
Year	Award	Category	Nominated work	Result	Ref
2002	3rd Metro FM Music Awards	Best Club DJ		Won	
2003	9th South African Music Awards	Best Selling Release	The Journey	Won	
2004	5th Metro FM Music Awards	Best Club DJ		Won	
2004	10th South African Music Awards	Best Dance Album	The Journey Continues	Won	
2005	11th South African Music Awards	Best Group or Duo		Won	
2005	11th South African Music Awards	Best Dance Album	Another Level	Nominated	
2005	11th South African Music Awards	Artist of the Year		Nominated	
2005	11th South African Music Awards	Song of the Year	The Anthem	Nominated	
2006	12th South African Music Awards	Best Group or Duo		Nominated	
2006	12th South African Music Awards	Song of the Year	Light of My Life	Nominated	
2007	13th South African Music Awards	Best Urban Dance Album	4 u	Nominated	
2013	12th Metro FM Music Awards	Best Dance Album	Evolution	Nominated	
2013	12th Metro FM Music Awards	Best Group Album	Evolution	Nominated	
2014	13th Metro FM Music Awards	Best Collaboration	Noqatiko (with Black Motion & Yasira)	Nominated	
