= South African Music Award for Duo or Group of the Year =

The South African Music Awards (often simply the SAMAs) are the Recording Industry of South Africa's music industry awards, established in 1995. The ceremony is held in late-April or May every year, with the judging process starting in November of the previous year. The nominations are typically announced at the end of March. The winners receive a gold-plated statuette called a SAMA.

The show is consistently held at the Super Bowl in Sun City, with exception of two years, and broadcast live on national broadcaster, SABC. The ceremony features live performances by a selection of nominees. The SAMAs are considered the South African equivalent of the American Grammy Awards. MTN has been the title sponsor of the event since 2003.

== 1990s ==
| 3rd SAMA (1997): Ladysmith Black Mambazo – Ukuzala-Ukuzelula | 4th SAMA (1998): The Usual – Like A Vision |
5th SAMA (1999): TKZee – Halloween

== 2000s ==
| 6th SAMA (2000): Ladysmith Black Mambazo – In Harmony | 7th SAMA (2001): Bayete and Jabu Khanyile – Thobekile; Louis Mhlanga and Eric van der Westen – Song for Nomsa; Kampi Moto and George Phiri – Acha Masimango; Eminent Child – Into the Universe; Brothers of Peace – Project A |
| 8th SAMA (2002): Bongo Maffin – Bongolution | 9th SAMA (2003): Mafikizolo – Sibongile; Brothers of Peace – Project C; Revolution – The Journey; Sheer All Stars – Dance with Me; Steve Newman and Tony Cox – About Time |
| 10th SAMA (2004): Mafikizolo – Kwela; Musik Ye Afrika – United We Stand; Skwatta kamp – Mkhukhu Funkshen; Tumi and the Volume – Live at the Bassline; Watershed – Wrapped in Stone | 11th SAMA (2005): Revolution – Another Level; Freshlyground – Nomvula; Sakhile – Togetherness; Trompies – Respect; Mafikizolo – Van Toeka Af |
| 12th SAMA (2006): Bongo Maffin – New Construction; Joyous Celebration – Joyous 9; Malaika – Vuthelani; Revolution – Roots; Wessel Van Rensburg and Mccoy Mrubata – Kulturation | 13th SAMA (2007): Mafikizolo – Six Mabone; Cassette – Welcome Back to Earth; Grassroots – African Moods; Shwi No Mtekhala – Angimazi Ubaba; Trompies – Can't Touch This |
| 14th SAMA (2008): Freshlyground – Ma'cheri; Ladysmith Black Mambazo – Ilembe; Malaika – ekunjalo; Seether – Finding Beauty in Negative Spaces; Soul Brothers – Amacala | 15th SAMA (2009): Soweto Gospel Choir – Live at the Nelson Mandela Theatre; 340ml – Sorry for the Delay; Bala Brothers – Strome Van Seën; Goldfish – Perceptions of Pacha; Joyous Celebration – Joyous Celebration Vol. 12 |

== 2010s ==
| 16th SAMA (2010): Jaziel Brothers – The Journey; aKING – Against All Odds; Big Nuz – Undisputed; Joyous Celebration – Volume 13 Live at the Mosaiek Theatre; Teargas – Dark Or Blue | 17th SAMA (2011): Liquideep – Fabrics of the Heart; Flash Republic – Killer Moves; Kwela Tebza – Gauteng Made in South Africa; Prime Circle – Jekyll and Hyde; Tumi and the Volume – Pick a Dream |
| 18th SAMA (2012): Mi Casa – Mi Casa Music; Big Nuz – Pound For Pound; GoodLuck – GoodLuck; Ladysmith Black Mambazo – Songs From The Farms; Taxi Violence – Unplugged: Long Way From Home | 19th SAMA (2013): Freshlyground – Take Me to the Dance; BlackByrd – Strong; Desmond and the Tutus – MNUSIC; DJ Vetkuk vs Mahoota – Dinaledi; The Muffinz – Have You Heard? |
| 20th SAMA (2014): Mafikizolo – Reunited; Gangs of Ballet – Yes/No/Grey; GoodLuck – Creatures of the Night; Mi Casa – Su Casa; The Parlotones – Stand Like Giants | 21st SAMA (2015): Beatenberg – The Hanging Gardens of Beatenberg; Bittereinder – Skerm; BlackByrd – Home; McCoy Mrubata – Brasskap Sessions Vol. 2; The Soil – Nostalgic Moments |
| 22nd SAMA (2016): Big Nuz – For the Fans; Desmond & The Tutus – Enjoy Yourself; Witness The Funk – Finding Nomusa; Marcus Wyatt & The ZAR Jaz Orchestra – One Night in the Sun; Junior Taurus & Lady Zamar – Cotton Candy | 23rd SAMA (2017): Black Motion - Ya Badimo; The Soil - The Soil; Jaziel Brothers - Jaziel Brothers; Soul Kulture - Ngeliny'ilanga; The Parlotones - Trinkets Relics & Heirlooms |
| 24th SAMA (2018): Mafikizolo - Mafikizolo; Team Mosha - Sofa Silahlane; Goldfish - Late Night People; Mi Casa - Familia; Prime Circle - If You Don’t You Never Will | 25th SAMA (2019): Black Motion – Moya Wa Taola; Tshwane Gospel Choir – The Next Revival; Spirit of Praise – Spirit of Praise Vol. 7; Ofeleba – Hi & Low; Encore – Segarona |
| 26th SAMA (2020): Ndabo Zulu & Umgidi Ensemble – Queen Nandi: The African Symphony; Malumz on Decks – Find Your Way; Worship House – Project 17 (Live at Carnival City); We Will Worship – Seasons, Volume II; Qadasi & Maqhinga – Ungabanaka | 27th SAMA (2021): Kabza De Small & DJ Maphorisa (Scorpion Kings) – Once Upon a Time in Lockdown; Reece Madlisa & Zuma – Ama Roto EP; MFR Souls – Musical Kings; Mas Musiq & Aymos – Shonamalanga; Mi Casa – We Made It |
| 28th SAMA (2022): Reece Madlisa & Zuma – Ama Roto Vol. 2; Watershed – Elephant in the Room; Franco Princeloo & Vox choir – Franco Princeloo: Kruis Van Liefde; Wouter Kellerman & David Arkenstone – Pangea; Shwi Nomtekhala – Wangikhulisa Umama | 29th SAMA (2023): DJ Maphorisa and Kabza De Small – Scorpion Kings Live Sun Arena; DJ Maphorisa and Visca – Ba Straata; Venom and Shishiliza – Love Is Pain; Mafikizolo – Idwala; Msaki and Tubatsi – Synthetic Hearts |
| 30th SAMA (2024): Kabza De Small, and Mthunzi – Isimo; Mellow & Sleazy – Boroko Keng; FokofPolisieKar – Dans Deur Die Donker; Ladysmith Black Mambazo – Soothe My Soul: Songs from our South African Church; Die Piesangskille and Johan Balt - Almal Gly | 31st SAMA (2025) |
32nd SAMA (2026): Amadodana Ase Wesile – Monghali Mesia; AC/ES – AC/ES (Rock)Blacks Jnr, Dankie Boi & GoldMax – New Wave; JAZZWRLD & Thukuthela – The Most Wanted; Abanqobi – The Journey Continues
