= Marcus Wyatt (musician) =

South African trumpeter, composer and producer

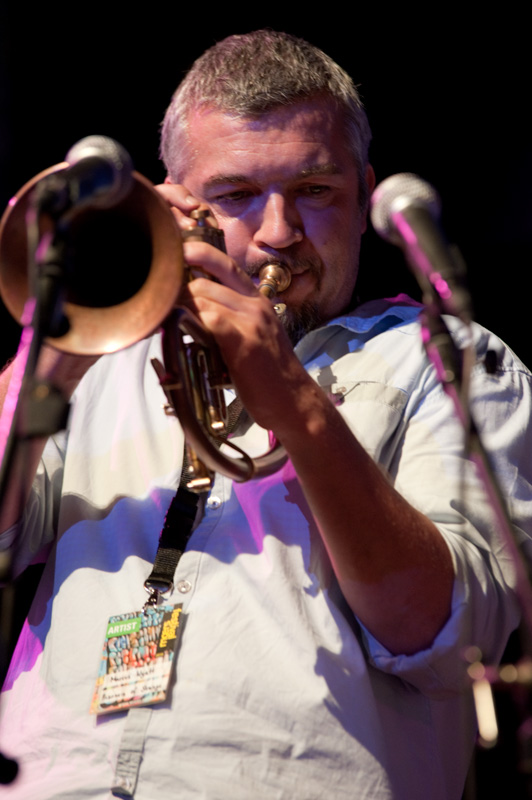
Marcus Wyatt, mœrs festival, 2010

Marcus Wyatt (born 1971, Port Elizabeth, South Africa), is a South African trumpeter, composer and producer.

Wyatt was introduced to music, mostly folk and blues, at a young age as his father was chairman of the local folk club. He was introduced to the trumpet at age eleven and started playing in his school band where he learnt to read and play. He studied classical music and played with orchestras in the Port Elizabeth area. He was called up to the South African Defence Force's Naval Band for National Service and during this time he developed his love for jazz. He furthered his music studies at the University of Cape Town's College of Music. He completed a degree majoring in composition and arrangement. In 2001, Wyatt spent a year living in Amsterdam, during this time he met and played with Clarence Beckton, Eric Calmes, Fra Fra Sound, Monica Akihary, Paul Stocker and Bug Band, Sean Bergin, Tzetzepi Band and Red Hot Chili Peppers.

Marcus Wyatt & The ZAR Orchestra won Best Jazz Album at the 22nd South African Music Awards, held in eThekwini on 4 June 2016. The album One Life In The Sun featured some of the best of South Africa's young jazz talent, including the 2016 Standard Bank Young Artist of the Year winner, vocalist and trombonist, Siya Makuzeni. All the tracks on the double CD were Wyatt's compositions or co-compositions, some with Makuzeni.

== Discography ==
Solo albums

- Marcus Wyatt & The ZAR Jazz Orchestra, Into Dust/Waltz for Jozi (2019)
- Marcus Wyatt & The ZAR Jazz Orchestra, One Night in the Sun (2015)
- Language 12, Maji Maji in the Land of Milk and Honey (2014)
- ZAR (2011)
- Marcus Wyatt & Language 12, Live @ House of Nsako (2009) DVD
- Language 12 (2006)
- Africans in Space (2002)
- Gathering (2000)

Band leader, group project or producer

- Bombshelter Beast, Listen Properly (2025)
- Bombshelter Beast, Dance of the Chicken (2017)
- Blue Notes Tribute Orkestra, Live at the Bird's Eye (2017)
- Language 12, Maji Maji in the Land of Milk and Honey (2014)
- Language 12, Language 12 (2006)
- Voice, Quintet Legacy Vol 1(2001)
- Heavy Spirits, Momentum (2001)

Soloist or sideman

- Pauly Hanmer, Accused no.1/Nelson Mandela (2006)
- Carlo Mombelli, Not So Strange (2006)
- Joe Berry, Makeba Forever (2006)
- Moreira Chonguica, The Moreira Project/The Journey (2006)
- Schalk Joubert, Kayamandi (2006)
- Melissa van der Spuy, The Menu of Love (2006)
- Jessica Wills, Zillion Miles (2006)
- Jimmy Dludlu, Corners of My Soul (2005)
- Alou April, Colourful World (2005)
- Judith Sephuma, New Beginnings (2005)
- Paul Hanmer, Water + Lights (2004)
- MXO, Peace of Mind (2004)
- Kunle, Sincerely Yours (2004)
- Tlale Makhene, The Ascension of the Enlightened (2004)
- Ernie Smith, Lovely things (2003)
- Zim Ngqawana, Vadzimu (2003)
- Andrew Lilley, Rejoicing (2003)
- Rus Nerwich, As Above So Below (2003)
- Musik Ye Afrika, United we Stand (2003)
- Tumi and The Volume, Live at the Bassline (2003)
- Paul Hanmer, Naivasha (2002)
- Hotep Idris Galeta, Malay Tone Poem (2002)
- Prince Kupi, Loxion (2002)
- Alou April, Bringing Joy (2002)
- McCoy Mrubata, Face The Music (2002)
- Carlo Mombelli, When Serious Babies Dance (2002)
- Gito Baloi, Herbs & Roots (2001)
- Ernie Smith, Child of the Light (2001)
- Steve Dyer, Down South in Africa (2000)
- Musa Manzini, New Reflections (2000)
- Paul Hanmer, Playola (2000)
- Sibongile Khumalo, Immortal Secrets (2000)
- Jimmy Dludlu, Essence of Rhythm (1999)
- Nine, Entropy (1998)
- Dave Ledbetter, Scorpio Rising (1997)
- Vusi Mahlasela, Silang Mabele (1997)
- Jimmy Dludlu, Echoes From The Past (1997)
- Blues Broers, Been Around (1996)
- The Truly Fully Hey Shoo Wow Band, The Truly Fully Hey Shoo Wow Band (1996)
- Winston Mankunku Ngozi, Siyamameza (1995)
- E-QUAD,No Smoke, E-quad 2007
- Bokani Dyer, Emancipate the Story 2012
- Herbie Tsoaeli, African Time, Sheer Sound 2012
- Thandi Ntuli, The Offering 2014, Exiled 2018
- Benjamin Jephta, Homecoming 2015, The Evolution of an Undefined 2017
- Dave Cousins, Flight of Fancy 2015
- Amaeshi Ikechi, Travail 2023
