= Johannesburg Youth Orchestra =

Youth symphony orchestra

The Johannesburg Youth Orchestra (JYO) is a youth symphony orchestra founded in 1976. It is a full size symphony orchestra based in Johannesburg, South Africa, and is made up entirely of children and youth who have achieved a musical level of Grade 6 or higher. The youngest member is 12 years old and the oldest members in their mid-twenties.

The JYO is one of 10 orchestras and ensembles within the Johannesburg Orchestra Company, a nonprofit organisation founded in 1998 which supports the Youth Orchestra and other youth musical groups. The Youth Orchestra Company provides training and performance opportunities for over 600 young people at any given time.

The Orchestra draws its members from all over Johannesburg and Soweto. It is conducted by Eddie Clayton and performs regularly in Johannesburg throughout the year and auditions new members each September. The orchestra is a section 21 company and is based in the Wozani Block on the Wits Education Campus, Parktown.

The Orchestra plays at a wide variety of venues including the Linder Auditorium, the Johannesburg Theatre, shopping malls and markets and even at the zoo and botanical gardens. The JYO has performed with local stars ranging from fusion chamber group the Soweto String Quartet to Kwaito outfit Mafikizolo and SA Jazz legends Jonas Gwangwa and Paul Hanmer to African instrument specialist Pops Mohamed. In 2011 the Orchestra formed a relationship with the South African Ballet Theatre, performing in May 2011 at the Val Whyte Bursary Competition.

The Orchestra Company receives support from the public and from foundations such as the Oppenheimer Memorial Trust. It is officially patronized by Duo Zappa Mainfoli under their Soweto Project. The Johannesburg Youth Orchestra also has strong ties with the South African National Youth Orchestra Foundation (SA NYO), which provides them with scores, venues and musicians.

== Past Conductors ==
Wian Joubert, Eddie Clayton, Adam H. Golding (founder and director of The African Renaissance Ensemble), Timon Wapenaar, Laurie Henderson Wapenaar, Alan Soloman (founder)

== See also ==
- List of youth orchestras
