= South African Music Awards =

Annual music industry award ceremony

South African Music Award
- Current: 32nd Annual South African Music Awards
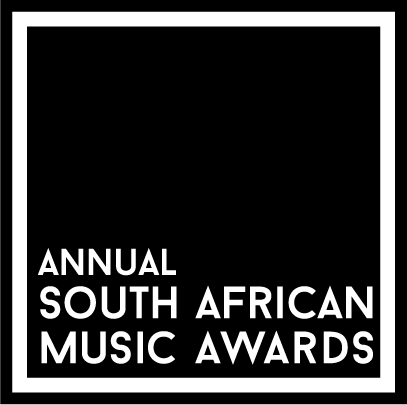
- Annual South African Music Awards Generic Logo
- Awarded for: Outstanding achievements in the music industry of South Africa
- Country: South Africa
- Presented by: Recording Industry of South Africa
- First award: 1995; 31 years ago
- Website: samusicawards.co.za

Television/radio coverage
- Network: SABC

The South African Music Awards (often simply the SAMAs) are the Recording Industry of South Africa's music industry awards, established in 1995. The ceremony is held annually, usually in late April or May, with the judging process starting in November of the previous year. The nominations are typically announced at the end of March. The winners receive a gold-plated statuette called a SAMA.

The show has mostly been held at the Super Bowl in Sun City, with the exception of three years, and broadcast live on national broadcaster, SABC. The ceremony features live performances as once-off collaborations by a selection of nominees.

== Awards ==
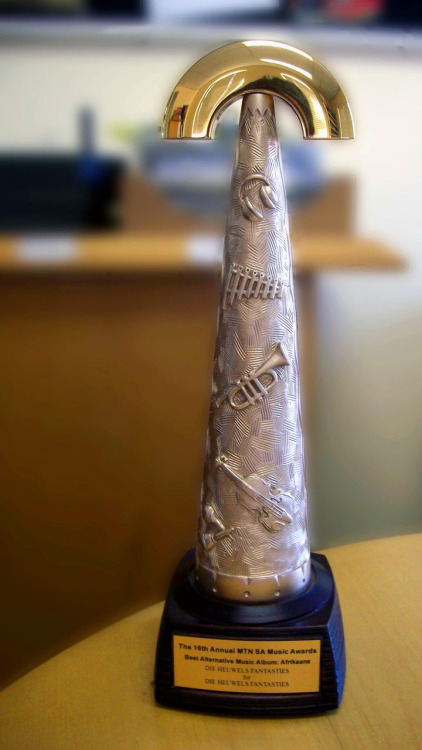
SAMA Award Statuette

As of the 26th SAMAs, in 2020, there are a total of 30 categories awarded. These categories change from year to year to accommodate changes in music styles and changes in popularity of already existing genres. These genres include adult contemporary, Afrikaans, classical, dance, faith, jazz, Kwaito, Maskandi, pop, rap, reggae, RnB, rock, soul, and traditional.

At times genres are grouped together into a single category based on their popularity amongst a certain demographic (e.g. Best Urban Artist nominees are often Hip Hop, African pop and Kwaito artists grouped together since these genres are popular amongst South Africans living in urban areas).

As of the 27th South African Music Awards, artists working in the Gqom and Amapiano genres will be considered in separate categories.

=== Top five awards ===
These are the top five award categories of the SAMAs. They were first introduced at the ceremony in 1995, with exception of Album of the Year that was introduced in 2007.

- Album of the Year
- Best Newcomer of the Year
- Best Female Artist of the Year
- Best Male Artist of the Year
- Best Duo or Group of the Year

=== Audience awards ===
The winners of the following SAMAs are not chosen by a panel of judges:

- Record of the Year: Determined by a public vote, traditionally by SMS

=== Mobile download awards ===
2008 - Lira - "Feel Good"

2009 - DJ Cleo - "Hands Up"

2010 - DJ Cleo - "Hands Up"

2011 - DJ Mzi (feat. DJ Cleo) - "Nababantwana"

2012 - DJ Cleo - "Facebook"

2013 - Zahara - "Loliwe"

2014 - Mafikizolo - "Khona"

2015 - Beatenberg and DJ Clock - "Pluto"

2016 - Nathi - "Nomvula"

2017 - Kwesta - "Ngud"

2018 - Timothy Bambelela Myeni - Joyous Celebration Volume 21: Heal Our Land

2019 - Lindelani Mkhize, Mnqobi Nxumalo, Siphiwe Ngcobo, and Thobeka Mahlangu - "Joyous Celebration 22 - All for You"

2020 - Mlindo the Vocalist - "Emakhaya"

== Eligibility and entry ==
As per the committee guidelines, only citizens and permanent residents of South Africa are eligible for a nomination.

== Adjudication process ==
At the beginning of the adjudication process a Supervisory Committee is set up, it consists of two members from each of five "super genre" categories, which are Global Charts, Urban, Traditional, Technical and Jazz or Classical. This committee oversees the entire SAMA ceremony production process, along with the Steering, General Rules, and Vetting Committees. These committees are composed of unpaid volunteers from record companies and industry stakeholders. The judges are drawn from a wide spectrum to include journalists, critics, musicians, producers, and academics. There are five judges per genre category, based on the judge's field of expertise. The judge's anonymity is protected by the Steering committee, who ensure the judge's do not influence each other. The entire adjudication process takes place between September and February, with the nominees announced in March.

=== Phase one ===
The first phase takes place between late-September and December. The Steering Committee first determine the award categories, rules, and judging criteria for the entries. A panel of judges is elected and a call for entries takes place in November. The entries are vetted to comply with the committee rules, and genre guidelines.

=== Phase two ===
In this genre category phase, the judges receive a copy of the entries (either an album and DVD) by the end of December. The entries are scored against the criteria set by the Steering Committee. The score cards are submitted online, along with recommendations for the Top Five category nominees. The Top Five categories are nominated from the same pool of entries. An electronic judging system calculates the results, which are then audited by an independent firm at the end of January.

=== Phase three ===
This final phase of adjudication evaluates the Top Five categories. One judge from each genre category is selected to be part of the first round of voting. These judges select their top three entries, in their respective genres, taking into account the recommendations from other judges. The independent auditing firm ensures that a finalist in the Top Five has qualified for a nomination in their respective genre. Once the auditors have confirmed the Top Five finalist list, the last round of voting begins. All the judges participate in this round to determine the winners of each Top Five categories.

== Ceremonies ==
The first awards ceremony was in 1995, there have been 32 editions to date.

Ceremony	Date	Most Awards	Album of the Year	Best Newcomer	Best Female Artist	Best Male Artist	Best Duo or Group	Host(s)	Venue
1st SAMA	1995		No Award	Soweto String Quartet	Brenda Fassie	Jabu Khanyile	No Award		Alberton City Hall
2nd SAMA	1996		No Award	Qkumba Zoo	Vicky Sampson	Lebo M	No Award		
3rd SAMA	1997		No Award	Revolution	Sibongile Khumalo	Johannes Kerkorrel	Ladysmith Black Mambazo		
4th SAMA	1998		No Award	Jimmy Dludlu	Yvonne Chaka Chaka	Vusi Mahlasela	The Usual		
5th SAMA	18 May 1999		No Award	Tasché	Brenda Fassie	Ringo Madlingozi	TKZee		
6th SAMA	30 March 2000		No Award	Gloria Bosman	Busi Mhlongo	Jimmy Dludlu	Ladysmith Black Mambazo	Martin Jonas	Sun City Super Bowl
7th SAMA	5 April 2001		No Award	Selaelo Selota	Miriam Makeba	Don Laka	Bayete and Jabu Khanyile		Sandton Convention Centre
8th SAMA	13 April 2002		No Award	Ernie Smith	Judith Sephuma	Jimmy Dludlu	Bongo Maffin	Vusi Twala; Unathi Mankayi	Sun City Super Bowl
9th SAMA	6 April 2003		No Award	Moses Khumalo	Sibongile Khumalo	Hugh Masekela for album Time	Mafikizolo		Sun City Super Bowl
10th SAMA	29 May 2004		No Award	Adilah	Swazi Dlamini	Themba Mkhize	Mafikizolo	Unathi Nkayi; Tshepo Maseko	Sun City Super Bowl
11th SAMA	19 April 2005		No Award	Simphiwe Dana	Thandiswa Mazwai	Themba Mkhize	Revolution		Sun City Super Bowl
12th SAMA	6 May 2006	Judith Sephuma (3)	No Award	Brickz	Judith Sephuma	Jimmy Dludlu	Bongo Maffin	Tumisho Masha	Sun City Super Bowl
13th SAMA	14 April 2007	Simphiwe Dana (4)	The One Love Movement On Bantu Biko Street	Siphokazi	Simphiwe Dana	Vusi Mahlasela	Mafikizolo	Kabelo Mabalane	Sun City Super Bowl
14th SAMA	3 May 2008	Freshlyground (4)	Ma' Cheri	Tasha Baxter	Karen Zoid	HHP	Freshlyground		Sun City Super Bowl
15th SAMA	2 May 2009	Lira (4)	Soul In Mind	Andile Mseleku	Lira	Abdullah Ibrahim	Soweto Gospel Choir	Trevor Noah	Sun City Super Bowl
16th SAMA	16 April 2010		Undisputed	Tshepo Mngoma	Lira	Black Coffee	Jaziel Brothers	Trevor Noah	Sun City Super Bowl
17th SAMA	21 May 2011	Professor (4)	Fabrics Of The Heart	Locnville	Thandiswa Mazwai	Professor	Liquideep	Loyiso Bala	Montecasino
18th SAMA	29 April 2012	Zahara (8)	Loliwe	Zahara	Zahara	AKA	Mi Casa		Sun City Super Bowl
19th SAMA	11 May 2013	Khuli Chana (3)	Lost in Time	Toya Delazy	Kelly Khumalo	Khuli Chana	Freshlyground		Sun City Super Bowl
20th SAMA	28 April 2014	Mafikizolo (12)	Reunited	Naima Kay	Zahara	Kabomo	Mafikizolo	Iminam Tatiya	Sun City Super Bowl
SAMA XXI	19 April 2015	Beatenberg (7)	The Hanging Gardens of Beatenberg	Cassper Nyovest	Bucie	AKA	Beatenberg	HHP	Sun City Super Bowl
SAMA22	4 June 2016	Nathi (6)	Pieces of Me	Nathi	Zonke	Nathi	Big Nuz	Somizi Mhlongo; Thando Thabethe	Durban International Convention Centre
SAMA23	27 May 2017	Kwesta (6)	AmaZulu	Amanda Black	Amanda Black	Kwesta	Black Motion	Somizi Mhlongo; Tumi Morake	Sun City Super Bowl
SAMA 24	2 June 2018	Mafikizolo (6)	Rose Gold	Shekhinah	Shekhinah	Prince Kaybee	Mafikizolo	Somizi Mhlongo Dineo Ranaka Mpho Popps	Sun City Super Bowl
SAMA 25	1 June 2019	Black Coffee (5)	Umqhele	Sho Madjozi	Sho Madjozi	Black Coffee	Black Motion	Bob Mabena Twasa Seoke Melanie Bala Khuli Chana Mpho Popps Nomzamo Mbatha	Sun City Super Bowl
SAMA 26	3 August - 7 August 2020		Scorpion kings	Ndabo Zulu & Umgidi Ensemble	Ami Faku	Prince Kaybee	Ndabo Zulu & Umgidi Ensemble	Dineo Langa and Donovan Goliath	Sun City Super Bowl
SAMA 27	31 July 2021	Kabza De Small (4)	Once Upon A Time in Lockdown	Bucy Radebe	Sho Madjozi	Kabza De Small	Kabza De Small & DJ Maphorisa	Bontle Modiselle Lawrence Maleka	Sun City Super Bowl
SAMA 28	28 August 2022	Chymamusique (3)	Musique	Khanyisile Mthethwa	Msaki	Chymamusique	Reece Madlisa & Zuma	Mpho Popps; Robot Boii	Sun City Super Bowl
SAMA 29	16, 17 November 2023	Kabza De Small (4)	Lavish Worship - Nontokozo Mbambo	Myztro	Nontokozo Mbambo	AKA	Scorpion Kings	DJ Sabby; Nomalanga Shozi	SunBet Arena
SAMA 30	2 November 2024	Tyla (4)	Isimo - Kabza De Small, Mthunzi	Tyla	Tyla	uGatsheni	Kabza De Small and Mthunzi	Minnie Dlamini	Gallagher Convention Center
SAMA31	14 December 2025	Thandiswa Mazwai (4)	Play at Your Own Risk	Nontokozo Mkhize		Goldmax – Play at Your Own Risk	Black Motion - "Takala"	Scoop Makhathini; Pamela Mtanga	Gallagher Convention Center
SAMA32	15 August 2026	Kabza De Small (4)	The Ground We're On	Sibalukhulu	HLE	Mzukulu	Amadodana Ase Wesile	Cassper Nyovest; Zanele Potelwa	Sun City Superbowl

== Notable moments ==
=== Arthur Mafokate on-stage defiance (1995) ===
At the 1st South African Music Awards, kwaito artist Arthur Mafokate performed a simulation of anal sex on a dancer. This was done as an act of defiance to the organisers, as he felt there was a need for a Kwaito Award. The following year the organiser introduced the award category.

=== Funky national anthem (1997) ===
It had been three years since the first democratic elections in South Africa and a new national anthem had been introduced at the beginning of the 1997. At the 3rd South African Music Awards, popular kwaito-group Boom Shaka decided to re-create the anthem in a "funky" on-stage performance, that later caused a "public blacklash".

=== Brenda Fassie demanding her award (2001) ===
Towards the end of the five-hour-long 7th South African Music Awards, Brenda Fassie accused a prominent journalist of being a homosexual - using the derogatory slang word Moffie. She went on to further accuse him of destroying her with the articles he published. At an after-party, she was seen fighting with Mandoza and demanding that he hand over his award as it was "her award".

=== First virtual reality live broadcast (2016) ===
The SAMA22 was the first awards show to be broadcast live in its entirety in 360° video, with virtual reality made possible by Unreal Industries.

=== Discrimination Accusation (2019) ===
Before the SAMA25, Simon Makgatholela, Kenny Makweng, and Ronee Sathekge, members of the Zion Christian Church (ZCC), launched a campaign criticising the SAMA for discrimination. The group claimed the SAMA had "snubbed" them for 25 years over the fact the SAMA have never recognised "veterans" in the gospel genre, such as Oleseng Shuping, Nkosana Kodi, and Mojeremane Xale. In response to the accusation, Recording Industry of South Africa CEO Nhlanhla Sibisi stated, "The Samas are open to all music and do not discriminate against any genre. We have invited them to explain why they feel we are discriminating against ZCC music."

== See also ==
- List of South African Music Award categories
- Metro FM Music Awards
