= Bokani Dyer =

Motswana-South African composer

- Birth name: Bokani Dyer
- Born: 21 January 1986 (age 39); Gaborone, Botswana
- Origin: Botswana
- Genres: Jazz, Electronic, R&B, Salsa, Classical
- Occupations: pianist; composer; music producer
- Instruments: piano; Keyboard
- Years active: 2008–present
- Labels: Dyertribe Music; Shane Cooper Music; Dyertribe
- Website: bokanidyer.com

Bokani Dyer (born 21 January 1986), is a Motswana-South African pianist, composer and music producer. He creates jazz music containing elements of electronic, R&B, salsa and classical music.

== Early life and education ==
Bokani Dyer was born in 1986 in Gaborone, Botswana. He moved to South Africa as a child in 1990. Dyer received piano lessons at the age of 14 and studied jazz at the University of Cape Town where he graduated in 2008. Following his graduation, he was awarded two international scholarships facilitating training and masterclasses with world-renowned musicians.

== Career ==
During his studies in 2006, he was selected by Andre Peterson for a youth band that took part in a summer school in Sogne, Norway. He was also part of the Standard Band National Youth Jazz band in Grahamstown, which played in Johannesburg and Cape Town and toured Sweden. In 2007, he founded the experimental electronic music duo, Soul Housing Project, with the vocalist Sakhile Moleshe, which opened the National Arts Festival in Makhanda (previously Grahamstown) and performed at the Lighthouse Festival in Croatia.

In 2009, he was runner-up in the SAMRO Overseas Scholarships competition which allowed him to travel to New York, where he was tutored by pianist Jason Moran. In 2010, he released his debut album Mirrors.

In 2011, he released his second album, Emancipate the Story. The album featured Marcus Wyatt, Buddy Wells, Ayanda Sikade, Shane Cooper, Mandla Mlangeni, Tony Paco and Mark Buchanan and was created as a result of him winning a Standard Bank Young Artist Award for Jazz.

In 2013, he won a SAMRO Overseas Scholarship during the final round of the competition.

In 2014, he embarked on his first European tour with his Swiss-based quintet to Switzerland, Germany, Czech Republic and the United Kingdom. As a result of the tour, he was later invited to perform at the opening of the London Jazz Festival in November.

In July 2015, he released his album World Music which was nominated for Best Jazz Album at the 2016 South African Music Awards. That same month, he embarked on a 10-show tour in South Africa and Mozambique with his trio, where he performed in Grahamstown, King William's Town, Johannesburg, Maputo and Cape Town.

In 2016, he was featured on Sisonke Xonti's debut album Iyonde. He performed as a soloist at the launch of the SA/Russia Cultural Seasons in Moscow and St Petersburg.

In 2017, he composed the original score for the South African film, Catching Feelings. That same year, he performed at the Safaricom Jazz Festival in Nairobi. He has also performed at the Jazzahead showcase in Germany, Cape Town International Jazz Festival, Musique en Ete Festival in Geneva and Festival Metis in France.

In 2019, he won a South African Music Award for Best Jazz album.

In 2020, he released his album Kelenosi. The album was written and recorded over two months during the extended lockdown period imposed on South Africa in 2020, and was performed for the first time at Untitled Basement in Johannesburg in November 2020. Explaining his album:

At the beginning of 2020, I was actually working on another album (Radio Sechaba). When lockdown hit, that wasn't possible, I didn't have contact with other musicians, there were no live shows. I was basically left to my own devices, so I started making beats by myself. "Kelenosi" means "by myself" [in Setswana].

== Discography ==
- Mirrors (2010)
- Emancipate the Story (2011)
- Oscillations (2013)
- World Music (2015)
- Kelenosi (2020)
- Radio Sechaba (2023)

== Awards and nominations ==
Year	Award ceremony	Prize	Result
2011	Standard Bank Young Artist Award	Jazz	Won
2016	South African Music Awards	Best Jazz Album	Nominated
2019	South African Music Awards	Best Jazz Album	Won
2021	All Africa Music Awards	Best Artist, Duo Or Group in African Jazz	Pending
