= Bayete =

Bayete or Bayeté may refer to:

- Bayete, a South African band led by Jabu Khanyile
- An alias of Todd Cochran
- A tribute given to Cecil Rhodes by Matabele leaders at his funeral in 1902, "the first time accorded to a white man"
- Bayeté, a traditional Zulu royal salute
