= Don Laka =

South African jazz musician, songwriter and music producer

- Born: Donald Mahwetša Laka; 15 December 1958 (age 66); Mamelodi, Pretoria
- Occupations: musician; singer; songwriter
- Known for: Sakhile; kwaai-jazz

Donald Mahwetša Laka (born 15 December 1958 in Mamelodi, Pretoria), professionally known as Don Laka, is a South African jazz musician, songwriter and music producer, as well as the founder of "kwaai-jazz".

Laka finished studying at the Royal Academy of Music with Grade 8 in classical guitar, but restrictions under the Apartheid regime kept him from enrolling at the Pretoria Conservatoire. In 1969 he went on to form his first band, and recorded for the first time in 1972 with featured Ray Phiri on guitar. After finishing 12th grade in 1978, he undertook formal training, eventually obtaining his license to teach music in high school in 1979. From 1980 to 1981 he joined the afro-fusion group Sakhile, formed by Sipho Gumede and Khaya Mahlangu, which revolutionised South African music and set the scene for groups like Bayete. Don recorded his first major release with a group called "Oneness" before moving on to form his own band with Sello Twala, called Ymage. In their ten years together, they recorded approximately 12 LPs which led to their 1986 meeting with producer Tony Visconti, who produced ten of David Bowie's albums, as well as works by Paul McCartney, T Rex and The Moody Blues.

During that time, the likes of Brenda Fassie would become interested in Don's style, who would then ask if he could write, produce or perform on their records. Don also co-launched the record label that was to become Kalawa Jazmee, initially selling records from the boot of their cars before evolving to form a bigger structure. Kalawa Jazmee was one of the first successful black-owned record companies in South Africa. He also appeared on most of Sankomota's albums as a string and keyboard arranger, and in 1990 started writing larger orchestral arrangements for Sibongile Khumalo, who performed with the National Symphony Orchestra (South Africa). In 1991 he went on to collaborate with South African vocal legends Yvonne Chaka Chaka and Rebecca Malope.

In 2013, Don Laka received a Grammy nomination for Best World Music album for producing Hugh Masekela's Jabulani in 2013.

== Kwaai-Jazz ==
Laka describes kwaai-jazz as a fusion of South African music styles including kwaito, kwela and marabi with jazz to create a more a soulful sound.

"In the late 80s and early 90s jazz music was not widely played on radio – or anywhere else – in South Africa for nearly 20 years. I needed a way to bring jazz to young people... Since jazz consists of different categories of music, like blues and Japanese jazz, among others, I wanted something that South Africans could identify with". – Don Laka, IOL

== Discography ==
=== Albums ===
- 2019: I Wanna Be Myself
- 2019: Passion
- 2019: Re-Birth of Kwaai Jazz
- 2018: Poison
- 2017: Reflections
- 2016: Boogie Breakdown: South African Synth Disco
- 2015: Afro Chopin
- 2014: Portraits
- 2008: Paradise
- 2007: Invitation
- 2002: Armageddon
- 2001: Pyramid
- 1998: Super Nova
- 1997: Destiny
- 1991: Lost Time
- 1987: Smile
- 1984: I Wanna Be Myself
- 1982: Going Crazy

=== Singles & EPs ===
- 1986: Stages of Love (EP)
