= Simphiwe Dana =

South African musician

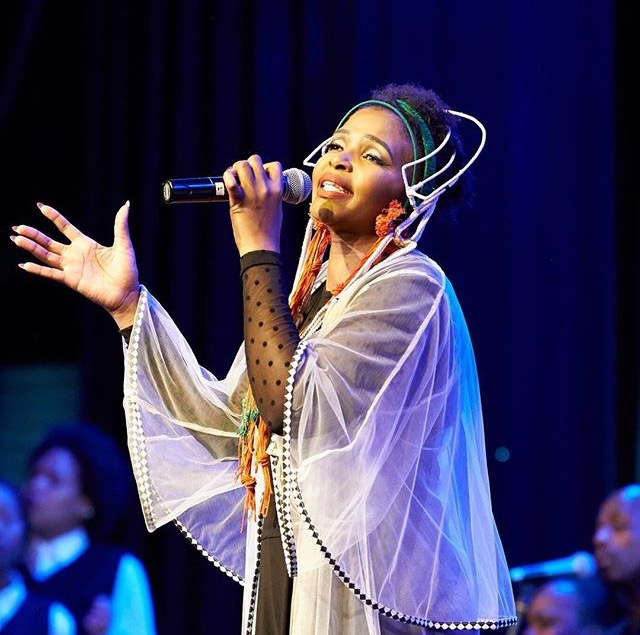
- Simphiwe Dana performing Live at "Theatre on the Track"

Background information
- Born: Simphiwe Dana; January 23, 1980 (age 46); Butterworth, Transkei South Africa
- Origin: Johannesburg, South Africa
- Genres: Jazz, Afro-soul and traditional music
- Occupations: Singer-songwriter, record producer
- Instrument: Vocals
- Website: SimphiweDana

Simphiwe Dana (born 23 January 1980) is a South African singer and songwriter who works mostly in her mother tongue, the Xhosa language. Dana is also known for her creative social commentary and activism through music as a political art form. Her career in music began in 2002, at the age of 22.

Born in Butterworth and raised in Lusikisiki in Transkei, Dana signed a record deal with Gallo Records and released her debut studio album, Zandisile (2004), which became a commercial success, winning Best Newcomer and Best Jazz Album.

== Early life ==
Simphiwe was born on 23 January 1980 in Butterworth, Transkei, South Africa and raised in the town of Lusikisiki.

Dana came from a religious background with her father being a preacher, exposing her to both choral and gospel music forms.

=== Education ===
She attended Vela Private School in Mthatha, where she matriculated in 1997.

Her tertiary education pursued her interests in graphic design, and she successfully studied for her National Diploma in IT at the Wits Technikon, Johannesburg.

== Career ==
After signing a record deal with Gallo Records, her debut album Zandisile was released in 2004. The album sold very well and gained several awards, including some South African Music Award (SAMA) in 2005. On its worldwide release the album gained success in the Billboard charts and she won an AVO Session Basel Award.

In 2005, Dana won the "Best Newcomer" award and Best Jazz Vocal album at the 11th South African Music Awards with her first album Zandisile.

In 2007, she was named the "Best Female Artist" at the 13th South African Music Awards, with the song "The One Love Movement on Bantu Biko Street". She is a creative advocate of Afrofuturism and Afrofeminism.

On July 9, 2010, Dana's third studio album Kulture Noir was released in South Africa. At the 10th annual ceremony of Metro FM Music Awards, she took home two awards: Best Contemporary Jazz, Best Female. On November 25, 2018, she performed at Moncalieri Jazz Festival in Turin.

In 2013 she started to record her album Firebrand and delayed to release it following the exit to her former label. In early 2014, she signed a record deal with Sony Music. On October 21, 2015, her fourth studio album Firebrand was released. The album produced four singles "Killjoy", "Roll Me Down", "Masterpiece" and "My Light".

On April 24, 2020, her fifth studio album Bamako was released.

== Discography ==
=== Studio albums ===
- Zandisile (2004)
- The One Love Movement on Bantu Biko Street (2006)
- Kulture Noir (2010)
- Firebrand (2015)
- Bamako (2020)
- TBA (2025)

=== Live albums ===
- An Evening with Simphiwe Dana: Live at the Lyric Theatre (2011)
- Celebrating Ten Years Live at the Bassline (2016)
- The Simphiwe Dana Symphony Experience (2017)

== Inspiration ==
Dana's music draws strongly on her upbringing in the Transkei, and she cites the powerful singing of her mother as an inspiration for her and her siblings, and ultimately as a key motivator in her resolve to pursue her musical career. She has been cited as the modern day Mama Africa.

== Achievements ==
=== South African Afro Pop Awards ===
Year	Nominee / work	Award	Result
2021	Saafma	Best Female Artist Award	Pending
2021	Saafma	Best Song of the Year	Pending
2021	Saafma	Best Rising Star	Pending

=== South African Music Awards ===
Year	Nominee / work	Award	Result
2005	Herself	Best Newcomer	Won
2021	Bamako	Best Adult Contemporary Album	Nominated
