= Sipho Gumede =

- Born: Sipho Gumede; 17 April 1952; Cato Manor, South Africa
- Died: 26 July 2004 (aged 52) Durban, South Africa
- Genres: Jazz,
- Occupations: Singer, songwriter, producer
- Instrument: Guitar
- Years active: 1970–2004

Sipho Gumede (17 April 1952 – 26 July 2004) was a South African jazz musician and composer. Gumede was best known for his bass guitar playing and his own music writing and was one of the founding members of the band Sakhile. He is known for his fusion of jazz and African sounds.

== Early life ==
Gumede was born in the Cato Manor area, an Indian-only area in Durban. Sipho developed a passion for music from a young age, even constructing a guitar using a tin can and strings. When Gumede was eight years old, his family was evicted from the Cato Manor area by the Apartheid government under the Group Areas Act evictions of the 1960s. At the age of twelve, Sipho relocated to a farm outside Umlazi. During his stay there, Sipho was introduced to various genres of music, especially at weddings and funerals. At the farm, he herded cattle and played his "homemade" guitar as the animals grazed. Eventually, Gumede moved on to playing a borrowed professionally-made guitar and thus became more skilled as a guitarist.

At the age of 16, he returned to Umlazi where he met Cyril Magubane, a jazz guitarist. Meeting Magubane opened up many opportunities for him to hear the music of many jazz masters, including Wes Montgomery . He also found himself meeting Dick Khoza, where he found work as a member of a jazz club called the "Jazz Revellers". In this club, he got the opportunity to play bass guitar.

== Works ==
1970

In 1970 Gumede moved to Ndonga Ziyaduma's house in Johannesburg, where he found himself in an unfamiliar place, Dorkay House on Ellof Road. It was here at Dorkay that he met many of the musicians he would eventually work with. His fellow musicians included Dennis Mpale and Cock Tlhotlhalemaje in the band known as "Isintu". He also worked with Dennis's band at the Piano Culo Music Festival. It was during this time that he also met Dick Khonza, whom he had previously worked with, who was based at the Pelican Nightclub, which was famous for its upbeat music in the 1970s.

Soon after, Gumede met Gibson Kente and they toured the country together. After his first tour, he took a sabbatical to further his guitar skills after hearing the music of Stanley Clarke, Airto Moreira, Flora Purim and Chick Corea. After the sabbatical, he met other jazz musicians and formed a band called "Roots". The musicians he worked with in this band included Jabu Nkosi, Barney Rachabane, Duke Makasi, Dennis Mpale and Enoch Mtlelane. The band did not last long, and when it ended, Gumede met Bheki Mseleku and they both called themselves "Spirit Rejoice" which was a jazz fusion band.

1990

In 1992, he won an OKTV award for his solo album, "Thank you for Listening". In 1995, he won a lifetime achievement award from Johnny Walker, where they recognized his significant contribution to the South African music industry. In 1995 he released another album titled "Ubuntu (Humanity). In 1996 he released the album titled "20 Years of My Life", this album looked back at Gumede's early days in jazz music. In 1998 Gumede released the album titled "Blues for My Mother" under the Sheer Music label, where he worked with artists such as Mandla Masuku, Paul Hammer and Xoli Nkosi. In 1999 Gumede was part of the band that played in the background when American jazz pianist Joe McBride came to South Africa .

2000

McBride and other jazz musicians including Andy Narell, Wayne DeLano and Manny Rodriquez were part of Gumede's album "New Era". At this time Gumede was playing bass guitar in a band known as "The Sheer All Stars" consisting of Paul Hanmer, McCoy Mrubata, Errol Dyers and Frank Paco. It was during this time that Gumede collaborated with Pops Mohamed to produce the critically acclaimed Kamamzoo. It was voted Best South African Jazz Song at the South African Music Awards.

In the 2000s, Gumede returned to KwaZulu-Natal where he taught music and performed for young people in the townships. During this time, he set up a recording studio in his home where he produced many of his albums. His last albums were "From Me to You" in 2004 and "Togetherness" with Sakhile. In 2004, his album "Blues for My Mother" went platinum.

== Discography ==
- Faces and Places (1985)
- We Know Who We Are (1986) [LP]
- 20 Years of Life (1986)
- Thank You for Listening (1990) [LP]
- Banana Jive City (1991) [LP]
- Down Freedom Avenue (1993)
- Outernational Meltdown (1994)
- Ubuntu – Humanity (1995)
- Blues for My Mother (1998)
- New Era (2000)
- Village Dance and Moore (2001) [CD]
- From Me to You (2002)
- African Sunrise (2004)

== Illness and death ==
After a brief illness in a Durban hospital, Gumede died on 26 July 2004 at the age of 47. He was survived by his newlywed wife Fikiswa Pupuma, his four children, including Mantombi, Sifiso, Nozipho and Nontuthuzelo, and his brother Qedi.
