= Unplugged: Long Way from Home =

Unplugged: Long Way From Home

Studio album by Taxi Violence
- Released: 2011

Taxi Violence chronology
The Turn (2009)	Unplugged: Long Way From Home (2011)	Soul Shake (2013)

Unplugged: Long Way From Home is the third studio album by South African rock band Taxi Violence, released in September 2011.

== Reception ==
Professional ratings
Review scores
Source	Rating
Muse Magazine	4/5 stars

Unplugged: Long Way From Home received positive reviews all round. The single "Heads or Tails (unplugged)" was playlisted on National radio stations. The album received two South African Music Award nominations in 2012. One for Best Rock Album and another for Best Group.

Taxi Violence have taken their early material and given us a masterclass in how a band can grow, learn and become best of breed. - Chris Roper

== Track listing ==
No.	Title	Length
1.	"Went Down To The River"
2.	"Devil 'n Pistol"
3.	"Unholy"
4.	"Long Way From Home"
5.	"Waking Up"
6.	"Blue Song"
7.	"Heads Or Tails"
8.	"Between Heaven And The Deep Blue Sea"
9.	"No More No Less"
10.	"The Turn"
11.	"Venus Fly Trap"
12.	"The Mess"
13.	"Untie Yourself"
