= Kwela Tebza =

African Kwela musical group of three brothers, Mpho, Tebogo, and Tshepo Lerole

- Origin: Sandton, South Africa
- Genres: Kwela
- Years active: 1996–present
- Members: Mpho, Tebogo and Tshepo
- Website: kwelatebza.com

Kwela Tebza is a South African Kwela musical group of three brothers, Mpho, Tebogo, and Tshepo Lerole. They play penny whistles.

== History ==
=== 1996 ===
The trio has been performing since 1996 and has published four albums to its name. The three Soweto-born brothers who make up the group are Tebogo, Tshepo and Mpho. They combine elements from Sophiatown and South African Jazz with contemporary beats and modern production techniques. The band claims that American actor Danny Glover is a fan.

They have collaborated with South African artists including The Parlotones, Mahotela Queens, Zolani Mahola of Freshlyground, Sliqour, Mxo, Tuks, Mzekezeke, Khanyi Mbau, Thembi Seete, Pro kid, Spikiri, Oskido Dj Mthepu and Winnie Khumalo.

The album Made In Africa is planned for release in 2015, and includes contributions from Femi Kuti, Salif Keita, Youssou N'Dour, Coldplay and Rihanna.

== Other work ==
Kwela Tebza is working on a reality television series Dream Builders to build homes for previously disadvantaged families and communities. The group have also worked to teach young people from 9 to 16 years old to play the penny whistle.

== Discography ==
- Kwela Tebza (1996)
- 6 Faces of Dr. Kwela (1999)
- The Journey (2007)
- King Kwela (2007)
- Made In South Africa (2009)
- Gauteng Made In South Africa/Reload (2009)
- The Calling (2015)

== Awards and nominations ==
- Best Styled Group at the METRO FM Music Awards 2007
- Best Adult Contemporary Album at the 2007 South African Music Awards
- Best Collaboration and Best Single at the METRO FM Music Awards 2009
- Best Styled at the Feather Awards 2010
- Nominated Best Remix at the Channel O Music Video Awards 2010
- Nominated Best Urban Pop Album at the 2011 South African Music Awards
