= Untie Yourself =

Studio album by Taxi Violence
- Released: 2006
- Label: Independent

Taxi Violence chronology
Untie Yourself (2006)	The Turn (2009)

Untie Yourself is the debut studio album by South African rock band Taxi Violence, released in 2006.

== Reception ==
Professional ratings
Review scores
Source	Rating
Mio	4/5 stars

Untie Yourself has mainly received positive reviews. Music Industry Online called the album fresh, yet not unique, saying, "the album came across both as an exercise in paying homage to, and as a genuine addition to, the rock oeuvre"

== Track listing ==
No.	Title	Length
1.	"Unholy"
2.	"Rock Out"
3.	"Untie Yourself"
4.	"Waking Up"
5.	"In Loving Memory Of Photosynthesis"
6.	"Music For My Teeth"
7.	"No More No Less"
8.	"Jimi's Revenge"
9.	"Question X"
10.	"Hellevator Action"
11.	"Living It Up"
12.	"The Mess"
13.	"Jimi's Revenge"
