= Gloria Bosman =

South African singer (died 2023)

- Born: c. 1973; Mofolo, Johannesburg, South Africa
- Died: 14 March 2023 (aged 50) Soweto, Johannesburg, South Africa
- Occupations: Singer; Songwriter
- Musical career
- Genres: Jazz
- Instrument: Vocals
- Years active: 1999–2023
- Label: Sheer Sound

Gloria Bosman (c. 1973 – 14 March 2023) was a South African jazz singer who began her career singing in a church choir in Soweto.

== Early life ==
Bosman was born and raised in Mofolo and Pimville Soweto in Johannesburg. She sang in her church choir before performing at the Market Theatre in 1993, gaining a scholarship to the Pretoria Technikon to study opera.

== Career ==
=== Solo career ===
Bosman released her debut album Tranquillity in 1999 earning her the award for Best Newcomer and nominations for Best Contemporary Jazz Album and Best Female Artist at the South African Music Awards. She won the Standard Bank Young Artist Award in 2000 at the National Arts Festival. In 2001 she released her second album The Many Faces of Gloria Bosman with Sheer Sound. She produced and composed most of the songs on this album, but also collaborated with Paul Hanmer. He wrote and co-produced two songs on the album. The album earned her nominations for Best South African Artist and The Most Promising Female Artist at the 2001 Kora All Africa Awards and another South African Music Award nomination for Best Jazz Vocal Album.

Bosman's 2003 album Stop & Think received nominations for Best Female Artist and Best Jazz Vocal Album at the 2003 South African Music Awards. She received six South African Music Award nominations and the title of Best Female Composer for her next album Nature's Dance.

=== Theatre ===
Bosman also featured in a number of musicals, namely Jubilation, Woman in Spirit and The Lion and the Lamb. She joined the theatrical production African Songbook at the Artscape Theatre Centre in 2010. She has also performed in Porgy & Bess and the Mandela Trilogy. She has toured the UK and was nominated for the Naledi Awards. She performed with Hugh Masekela in Songs of Migration at the Market Theatre and Joburg Theatre in 2011 and 2013.

=== Writing ===
In 2020, she contributed a chapter to the award-winning book, Joburg Noir, edited by Niq Mhlongo. Bosman subsequently joined Imbiza Journal becoming one of the lead contributors to the journal.

Bosman joined the South African Music Rights Organisation (Samro) in December 2022 as a non-executive board member.

In March 2023, her family announced that she died following a short illness.

== Discography ==
- Tranquillity, 1999
- The Many Faces of Gloria Bosman, 2002
- Stop & Think, 2003
- Nature's Dance, 2004
- Emzini, 2006
- Letters from the Heart vol. 1, 2010
