= List of South African Music Award categories =

South African Music Awards (SAMAs) are awarded in a series of categories, each of which isolate a specific contribution to music. The standard awards list nominees in each category from which a winner is selected. SAMA categories have been added and removed over time.

== Special awards ==
There are special awards which are awarded without nominations, typically for achievements of longer than the past year, which the standard awards apply to:

- Lifetime Achievement Award is a Special Merit Award presented to performers who, during their lifetimes, have made creative contributions of outstanding artistic significance to the field of recording.
- International Achievement Award is a Special Merit Award presented to performers who, during their musical careers, have achieved notable international success.

== Top 5 categories ==
The Top 5 categories are standard awards for musical works which do not restrict nominees by genre, but may do so by some other criteria:

- Album of the Year is awarded to the performer and the production team of an album.
- Group or Duo of the Year is awarded to a group or duo with reference to an album.
- Newcomer of the Year is awarded to an artist with reference to an album.
- Female Artist of the Year is awarded to a female artist with reference to an album.
- Male Artist of the Year is awarded to a male artist with reference to an album.

== Genre-specific categories ==
=== Afrikaans ===
- Best Afrikaans Traditional Music Album
- Best Adult Contemporary Album: Afrikaans
- Best Afrikaans Gospel Album
- Best Kiddies Album: Afrikaans
- Best Country Music Album
- Best Rock Album: Afrikaans
- Best Alternative Music Album: Afrikaans
- Best Pop Album: Afrikaans
- Best Sokkie Dans Album
- Best Afrikaans DVD

=== Global Charts ===
- Best Adult Contemporary Album: English
- Best Contemporary Christian Music Album
- Best Kiddies Album: English
- Best Rock Album: English
- Best Alternative Music Album: English
- Best Pop Album: English
- Best Global Chart DVD

=== Jazz and Classical ===
- Best Popular Classical Album
- Best Instrumental Album
- Best Traditional Jazz Album
- Best Contemporary Jazz Album
- Best Jazz/Instrumental/Popular Classical DVD

=== Technical and Video ===
- Best Music Video of the Year
- Best Producer
- Best Engineer
- Remix Of The Year
- Best Album Packaging

=== Traditional ===
- Best South Sotho Music (SeSotho) Album
- Best Tsonga Music (XiTsonga) Album
- Best Venda Music (TshiVenda) Album
- Best Mbhaqanga Album
- Best Maskandi Album
- Best Traditional A Capella Album
- Best Adult Contemporary Album: African
- Best African Contemporary Gospel Album
- Best African Traditional Gospel Album
- Best Traditional African A Capella Gospel Album
- Best Alternative Music Album: African
- Best Traditional/African Adult Contemporary African DVD

=== Urban ===
- Best Urban Gospel Album
- Best Pop Album: African
- Best Urban Pop Album
- Best Urban Dance Album
- Best R&B/Neo-Soul Album
- Best Rap Album
- Best Kwaito Album

== Other awards ==
- Record of the Year
- Best Selling Album
- Best Selling mobile music download
