= 32nd Annual South African Music Awards =

Annual South African Music Awards

32nd South African Music Awards
- Sponsored by: The Motsepe Foundation; Department of Sports, Arts and Culture; CAPASSO; SAMRO; SAMPRA; SABC
- Date: 15 August 2026
- Country: South Africa
- Presented by: Recording Industry of South Africa
- Hosted by: Cassper Nyovest; Zanele Potelwa
- Motto: The Future Sounds Like Now Now

Highlights
- Most wins: Kabza De Small (4)
- Most nominations: Kabza De Small (4)

Television/radio coverage
- Network: SABC1; YouTube

The 32nd Annual South African Music Awards (or SAMA32) took place on 15 August 2026 at the Sun City, Superbowl. Primarily sponsored by the Motsepe Foundation, the event is presented by the Recording Industry of South Africa.

== Winners and nominees ==
Below is the list of nominees.Winners are listed first and highlighted in bold.

=== Top 5 Categories ===
Special awards
**Album of the Year**
- **HLE – The Ground We’re On**
**Duo or Group of the Year**
- **Amadodana Ase Wesile**
**Female Artist of the Year**
- **HLE**
**Male Artist of the Year**
- **Mzukulu**
**Newcomer of the Year**
- **Paras “Sibalukhulu” Dlamini**

=== Album Genre Super Categories ===
Album genre super categories
**Best Amapiano Album**: **Kabza De Small – Bab’Motha**; Babalwa M – Acquiesce; De Mthuda – Mthuthuzeli; Kelvin Momo – N'wana Wa Mutsonga; Kelvin Momo – Thato Ya Modimo
**Best African Adult Contemporary Album**: **Simphiwe Dana - Moya**; Jabulile Majola - Isitifiketi; Madala Kunene & Sibusile Xaba - KwaNtu; Zawadi Yamungu - Ngimuhle; Banda Banda - ZINZA	**Best Pop Album**: **Will Linley - Don’t Cry Because It’s Over**; Matt Gardiner - Last Call for Departure; Shekhinah - Less Trouble; Anica Kiana - Not the Same; Tannah - Phases
**Best Alternative Album**: **Handsome Luke & The Heartbreakers — Mars Baby**; Charles Webster - From The Hill; 44coles - Furniture; Bombshelter Beast - Listen Properly; Archi - THROWING STONES	**Best R&B/Soul Album**: **Lordkez - You, Me & The 90’s**; Gemma Fassie – Island 22; Maxine Ceasar – It's Complicated; Lucille Slade – Resurfaced; Langa Mavuso – Therapy: The Other Side
**Best Hip Hop Album**: **Nasty C – Free**; MashBeatz - The Secret Frequency; FLVME - Blvck & White; Danya Devs - Bayede; Riky Rick - Boss Zonke Forever	**Best Rock Album**: **Francois van Coke - Die Ruimte**; AC/ES – AC/ES; We Kill Cowboys - Back From the Dead; Karel Bester & Die Kraaines Band - ONKRUID; Acid Magus - Scatterling Empire
**Best Adult Contemporary Album (English)**: **Tutu Puoane, Metropole Orkest & Jacome Bairos - Wrapped in Rhythm, Vol.2**; Abel Selaocoe, Aurora Orchestra, Nicholas Collon, Bernhard Schimpelsberger - Four Spirits (Live); Kahn Morbee - Buzzhead; Tim Parr - Malachi's Dream; Wandile Mbambeni - You Love Who You Love	**Best Gqom Album**: **Blacks Jnr, Dankie Boi, GoldMax - New Wave**; Funky Qla - Dark or Durban 3; DJ Tira — Izinsimbi zaMakoya; Dladla Mshunqisi, Beast RSA - Puku Puku; DJ Lag - Southside Mixtape
**Best Dance Album**: **Jazzwrld & Thukuthela - The Most Wanted**; Dlala Thukzin - Mayvis; Mörda - Asante III; MaWhoo - Amazwi Okubonga; Da Capo - Indigo Child II: Love & Frequency	**Best Traditional Faith Album**: **Bucy Radebe – Praise & Worship in the Wilderness, Pt. 1**; Zaza - Sound of Gratitude (Live at Urban Brew Dome); Sindi Ntombela - The Watchmans Camp; Puleng March - Worship in Newness; Ntethe - Back To The Altar
**Best Contemporary Faith Music Album**: **HLE - The Ground We're On**; Nqubeko Mbatha - Passover; Mmuso Worship — Testify (Live at 012 Central, Pretoria 2024); Ncebakazi Msomi - The 37th Psalm (Live at Emperors Palace); Brenden Praise — The GAP	**Best African Indigenous Faith Music Album**: **Amadodana Ase Wesile - Monghali Mesia**; Difela — De Bruin Gospel Projects; THE NEW BELIEVERS OF GOD GOSPEL SINGERS - NGIYA BONGA BABA; Abanqobi - The Journey Continues; Zion Iskhalanga Academy - U TA HLAMULA
**Best Traditional Album**: **Makhadzi Entertainment – Sesi Ka Rose**; MetroBeatz RSA – Born For This; King Monada – I Khant Do Dis Enimo; Pleasure Tsa Manyalo – Pleasure in 20 Years; Soul Brothers – Thath’owakho	**Best Maskandi Album**: **Mzukulu – Ng’funaIntozami**; Saliwa - Amalandi Amathathu; Mbuzeni - Izilotshi; Ntencane - Khotha La (A Tribute To Mjikjelwa); Smiramira - Ngabe Ngiloyiwe
**Best Jazz Album**: **Mandisi Dyantyis - Intlambululo: Ukuhlambulula**; Paras “Sibalukhulu” Dlamini - Ingoma Busuku; Temba Ncetani - INTLUNGU. INTLUPHEKO. IMBILINI; Lumanyano Mzi - Ithemba Elitsha (A New Hope); Billy Monama - The Y-Factor Project	**Best Classical/Instrumental Album**: **Guy Buttery – Orchestrations**; Marius Small-Smith – First Light; John Lundun – Let the Children Play; University of Pretoria Camerata – Light the Whole Sky; uBeyond – Radio Gogo Worldwide
**Best Afro Pop Album**: **Sjava - Inkanyezi 2.0 (Live)**; Lwah Ndlunkulu - Amaciko; CiCi - Busisiwe 2.0; Nomfundo Moh - Out of the Box	**Best Reggae Album**: **Ras Canly — Foreign Exchange**; DIMAHR – DIMAHR; Don Dada – Forward We Continue; Layahn King – Rasta Man Step; Red I Scorch – Victorious

=== Technical Categories ===
Technical categories
**Best Produced Music Video**: **Msaki, Jesse Clegg & Sjava — "Wayside Lover" (Dir: Marty Bleazard)**; DJ Maphorisa & XDuppy - "Abantwana Bakho" (Dir: Nyiko); Nasty C & Blxckie - "Leftie (Dlala Ngcobo)" (Dir: Lordnelle); Kamo Phela - "Partii" (Dir: Lindo_Langa); Sam Deep featuring Mano — "Shela" (Dir: Nyiko)	**Best Produced Album**: **Langa Mavuso - Therapy: The Other Side** (Produced by various artists); Banda Banda - ZINZA (Produced by Banda Banda); Paras “Sibalukhulu” Dlamini - Ingoma Busuku (Produced by Nduduzo Makhathini); Shekhinah - Less Trouble (Produced by Shekhinah); Mauritz Lotz - Sacred Cycle (Produced by Mauritz Lotz)
**Best Engineered Album**: **Guy Buttery — Orchestrations (Engineered by Guy Buttery & Fuzzy)**; Kabza De Small — Bab'Motha (Engineered by Thato & Kabza De Small); Nasty C — Free (Engineered by Mike Manitshana); L8 Antique — Ntu Futurism (Engineered by Matthew); Samthing Soweto — Touch is a Move (Good Morning) (Engineered by Ross Dorkin)	**Remix of the Year**: **Kabza De Small ft. Njelic, Mthunzi , Mkeyz, GL_Ceejay & Simmy – "Eningi (Remix)"**; lordkez ft. Cassper Nyovest – "Aweh (Remix)"; Maline Aura, Drega & Mdu aka TRP – "Mabebuza (Mdu aka TRP Remix)"; 340ml & Black Motion – "Midnight (Black Motion Remix)"; Nduduzo Makhathini, Anna Widauer & Fka Mash – "Re-Amathambo (Remix)"
**Best Collaboration**: **DJ Maphorisa & XDuppy, Kabza De Small featuring Thatohatsi, Young Stunna & Nkosazana Daughter - "Abantwana Bakho"**; DJ Maphorisa & XDuppy, Enny Man Da Guitar, Focalistic, Ricky Lenyora, Uncool MC, Mellow & Sleazy - "Dlala Ka Yona"; Sam Deep, Nia Pearl, Boohle, Mano - "Shela"; Sam Deep, Thatohatsi - "Thandaza"; Myztro, Leehleza, Shaunmusiq, Tears - "Tobetsa 3.0"

=== Public Vote ===
Public vote categories
**Record of the Year**: **Umafikizolo - "Uyoncengwa Unyoko"**	**Music Video of the Year**: **Mawhoo, GL_Ceejay, Thukuthela featuring JAZZWRLD - "Bengicela"**

== Special awards ==
Special awards
Lifetime Achievement Award
- Oskido
AfriPure International Achievement Award
- Tyla
CAPASSO Most Streamed Song of the Year
- DJ Maphorisa & XDuppy, featuring Thatohatsi, Young Stunna & Nkosazana Daughter - "Abantwana Bakho"
SAMRO Highest Airplay Composer
- Nontokozo Mkhize – "Esandleni"
Rest of Africa
- Tiwa Savage - "This One Is Personal"
