= Taxi Violence =

Band from Cape Town, South Africa

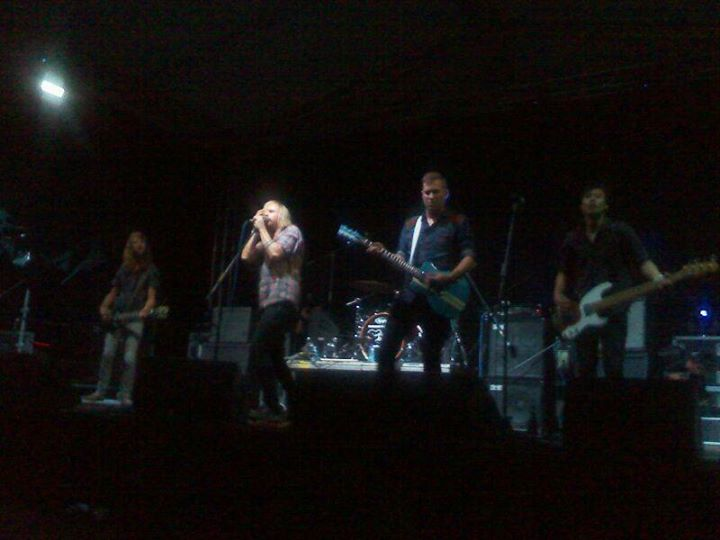
- Taxi Violence live at RAMfest 2014. Pictured from left to right: Rian Zietsman, George van der Spuy, Loedi van Renen and Jason Ling.

Background information
- Origin: Cape Town, South Africa
- Genres: Rock
- Years active: 2004–present
- Members: George van der Spuy; Rian Zietsman; Louis Nel; Jason Ling; Loedi van Renen
- Website: www.taxiviolence.com

Taxi Violence is a South African rock band from Cape Town. The group consists of George van der Spuy (vocals), Jason Ling (bass), Louis Nel (drums), Rian Zietsman (guitar) and Loedi van Renen (guitar/bass). They have released five studio albums: Untie Yourself (2006), The Turn (2009), Unplugged: Long Way From Home (2011), Soul Shake (2013), and Tenfold (2014). They are influenced by bands such as: Black Rebel Motorcycle Club, Queens of the Stone Age, Led Zeppelin, Jimi Hendrix, Nirvana, and Pearl Jam.

== History ==
Taxi Violence formed in 2004 when Rian Zietsman, Loedi van Renen and Louis Nel invited George van der Spuy to join a jam. The group liked van der Spuy's performance and the vocals he provided which led to the formation of the band. Van der Spuy's father worked at the Wynberg Military Base and arranged a bunker for the band to rehearse and write.

The band's first release was a self-titled EP in 2004 and by the following year they had already built up a big following.

Why the name 'Taxi Violence'

In 2004 the band had been booked for their first show, but were yet to come up with a band name. After having written pages of suggested names, Louis drove past a billboard of a local news paper which read "TAXI VIOLENCE rocks the Western Cape". At the next rehearsal it was agreed that rocking the Western Cape was what the band had set out to do so they settled on the name TAXI VIOLENCE.

=== Untie Yourself era (2004–2008) ===
The band rehearsed at the Wynberg Military Base writing tracks for their Self-titled EP. The EP contained the songs "Nothing Left to Lose", "Waking up" and "Rock out". The latter two tracks would later be re recorded and added to the first full-length album Untie Yourself.

In 2005 Taxi Violence won a national battle of the bands (RBF Studios Emerging Sounds Competition) and turned down the subsequent prize of a record deal as it did not allow them creative control over their music.

Untie Yourself was recorded and mixed by Richard Harriman at RockitDog Sound Production. The opening track "Unholy" contains a Bill Hicks clip which was used by permission of Arizona Bay Production Company Inc. The album was released in 2006 to critical acclaim. Untie Yourself was voted GQ Magazine's 'Album Of The Month' in January 2007. The following year the album received a South African Music Award nomination for Best Rock Album.

South Africa's first really original rock record since Nude Girl's Neanderthal.- GQ magazine

The first single "Untie Yourself" reached number four on 5FM's Top 40 – 2007 and earned the band a slot at My Coke Fest (2007) which saw them share the stage with 3 Doors Down, Hoobastank, Staind and Evanescence at My Coke Fest 2007.

Live is where one gets to experience the energy of Taxi Violence, so much so that it earned them 'Best Live Act of 2007' by Media24.

By March 2008, Loedi Van Renen had decided to focus on other projects which meant he would have to relocate to Johannesburg. Before his departure the band held auditions which saw the recruitment of bassist Jason Ling.

=== The Turn era (2009–2010) ===
Early 2009, the band left their management and booking agency. Things were changing and this set the mood for the follow-up album, The Turn. The band locked themselves up at The Ling residence and began pre-production.

The Turn was self-produced and recorded by the band at Kill City Blues, the studio owned by singer George van der Spuy. It was released through Sheer Sound in August 2009. The album did well on local campus radio stations and contains crowd favourites, "Devil 'n Pistol" and "Venus Fly Trap".

This isn't the great album that Taxi Violence will still make, if they avoid the usual implosion. But it puts down a marker in the dusty landscape of South African rock, a parched environment that is made that little bit greener by the passion and truth that is Taxi Violence.

— Chris Roper

The Turn is a driving, urgent-sounding piece of road rock that sounds like the ultimate road trip movie being fed directly into your ears.

— Foundcloud Reviews

The single "The Turn" reached number 1 on the MK charts in November 2010

The music video for The Turn, directed by Ryan Kruger, won two awards at the Wirral International Film Festival 2010 in England. Ryan won 'Best Director of Music Video' and Philip Hotz won the Vesbin Award for 'Best Actor'.

The short documentary "Feeling Unholy", was filmed by Smokin' Gun Productions. It follows the band throughout the recording process and the tour which followed.

After a successful nationwide South African tour, the band embarked on their first European tour. Travelling to Germany and The Netherlands, their music was well received. On their arrival back, they went straight back onto the road and headlined the Nokia Rock Summer Road Tour.

=== Unplugged Long way from Home era (2011–2012) ===
Besides the big festivals and loud rock shows, the band had also been booked to play many unplugged/acoustic shows. Realising that there was a demand for their unplugged sound, the band went into pre-production at Kill City Blues Studios with the aims of recording an unplugged album. Once they were ready to record, the band teamed up with Brendyn "Rusti" Rossouw at Heritage Sound Studio in Cape Town. The album was mixed by Neil Snyman and mastered by Rogan Kelsey. Songs were taken from Untie Yourself and The Turn. They were completely rearranged and pianos, strings and harmonica being added to fill out the sound. The album included three new composition, the title track "Long Way From Home", "Blue Song" and "Between The Heavens and the Deep Blue Sea".

It was during this time that George's father Hubert died. George would go on to pen the lyrics for "Between The Heavens and the Deep Blue Sea" and the album was dedicate to Hubert van der Spuy.

Unplugged: Long Way From Home was launched in September 2011 at the Iziko Planetarium in Cape Town to very positive reviews. The album would go on to receive two South African Music Award nominations in 2012. One for Best Rock Album and another for Best Group.

Taxi Violence have taken their early material and given us a masterclass in how a band can grow, learn and become best of breed.

— Chris Roper

The Music video for "Heads or Tails (unplugged)" won 'Best Video Award' at Wirral International Film Festival 2011. Again, directed by Ryan Kruger. A A music video for "Unholy (unplugged)" which features model /actress Tanit Phoenix was directed and filmed by Jason Falkov. It received a MK Music Award Nomination.

In 2013, the unplugged version of Devil 'n Pistol was used in the feature film Spud 2: The Madness Continues, starring John Cleese.

=== Soul Shake era (2012–2014) ===
During 2012, members of the band wanted to create something new outside of Taxi Violence. George van der Spuy went on to front Rock band Goodnight Wembley while Louis Nel and Rian Zietsman formed alternative rock band BEAST.

Pre-production for what would become Soul Shake began also began during this time period. Writing sessions took place in the basement of the house that Louis and Rian were renting and then pre-production completed at Kill City Blues Studios.

The band teamed up once again with Brendyn "Rusti" Rossouw at Heritage Sound Studio in Cape Town. The idea was to record and release and EP but after hearing the results in November 2012, it was decided that a full album was rather the way to go forward. The band went back into the basement, which was now dubbed the "man cave" where they worked on various demos that each member had brought forward. By early 2013 they were back at Heritage Sound recording the second half of the album.

Soul Shake was released in July 2013. It was mixed my Theo Crous at Bellville Studios and mastered by Rogan Kelsey at Lapdust Studios.

You may never have heard of Taxi Violence before – but all that should change. Now.

— Russell Hughes - Rush on Rock

The song "Brainmash" is about having a crazy night and being the life of the party to feeling like death in the morning. The single was playlisted on 5FM and did well on all campus radio stations. The album also features a cover version of "God's gonna cut you down", a song made famous by Johnny Cash.

A video was shot for the single "Love Sick Rock 'n Roll" which was aired on MTV.

=== Tenfold era (2014–present) ===
It was just after the Soul Shake tour that the band started thinking about how they would celebrate their ten years together. It was decided that the best way was to thank the loyal fans by recording another album and releasing it digitally and as a limited edition vinyl.

With spirits high in the camp the band came started writing again. The drums and vocals were recorded at Heritage Sound Studio while the guitars and bass were recorded at the newly revamped Kill City Blues Studios. The album was recorded between March 2014 and August 2014, mixed by Jürgen von Wechmar at Sunset Recording Studios and mastered by Tim Lengfeld at TL Mastering.

The band toured their fifth studio album Tenfold around South African. Former bassist Loedi Van Renen was invited back into the ranks as rhythm guitarist for the tour.

Tenfold earned the band another South African Music Award nomination at the 2015 awards. Once again for Best Rock album.

== Awards ==
| Year | Nominated work | Award | Result |
|---|---|---|---|
| 2007 | Nothing left to lose | MK Music Awards: Best animation | Nominated |
| 2008 | Untie Yourself | South African Music Awards: Best Rock | Nominated |
| 2012 | Unplugged: Long Way From Home | MK Music Awards: Best Rock | Nominated |
| 2012 | Unplugged: Long Way From Home | South African Music Awards: Duo or Group | Nominated |
| 2012 | Unplugged: Long Way From Home | South African Music Awards: Best Rock | Nominated |
| 2013 | Unholy | MK Music Awards: Best Rock | Nominated |
| 2015 | Tenfold | South African Music Awards: Best Rock | Nominated |

== Band members ==
- George van der Spuy – lead vocals (2004–present)
- Rian Zietsman – lead guitar (2004–present)
- Louis Nel – drums (2004–present)
- Jason Ling – bass (2008–2015)
- Loedi van Renen – bass (2004–2008, 2014–present)

== Discography ==
- Untie Yourself (2006)
- The Turn (2009)
- Unplugged: Long Way From Home (2011)
- Soul Shake (2013)
- Tenfold (2014)
