= Moses Khumalo =

South African jazz saxophonist

Moses Khumalo (30 January 1979, in Soweto – 4 September 2006) was a South African jazz saxophonist. He studied at Manu Technical College from 1994–1998 after graduating from community college. He started with the piano but switched to the saxophone in February 1995.

He first performed publicly at the Grahamstown National Arts Festival in 1995, and gained attention in the jazz world as a member of Moses Taiwa Molelekwa's band. In the following years he played with Hugh Masekela, Sibongile Khumalo, and Paul Hanmer. Khumalo had been dubbed "one of South Africa's most promising young saxophonists".

Moses Khumalo died of an apparent suicide by hanging at the age of 27 on 4 September 2006.

== Discography ==
- Mntungwa (2002)
- Ibuyile (2006)
