= Soul Shake =

Studio album by Taxi Violence
- Released: 2013
- Label: Independent

Taxi Violence chronology
Unplugged: Long Way From Home (2011)	Soul Shake (2013)	Tenfold (2014)

This is about the song. For the slapping gesture, see low five.

Soul Shake is the fourth studio album by South African rock band Taxi Violence, released in July 2013.

== Reception ==
Soul Shake receivedpositive reviews upon its release.

Soul Shake is easily their best – most electrifying, kinetic, and yes, most catchy – album yet. At last, Taxi Violence have recorded an album that captures the catharsis of their live shows.

— Rolling Stone Magazine

== Track listing ==
No.	Title	Length
1.	"Brainmash"
2.	"Seize the Day"
3.	"Lost Sock"
4.	"Love Sick Rock 'n Roll"
5.	"Best of Both"
6.	"Soul Shake"
7.	"Paint the Streets"
8.	"Ain’t Got the Time (But I Got the Moves)"
9.	"God’s Gonna Cut You Down"
10.	"Get Me Off"
11.	"Walk Across My Grave"
