= Afrika Mkhize =

South African Jazz pianist and composer

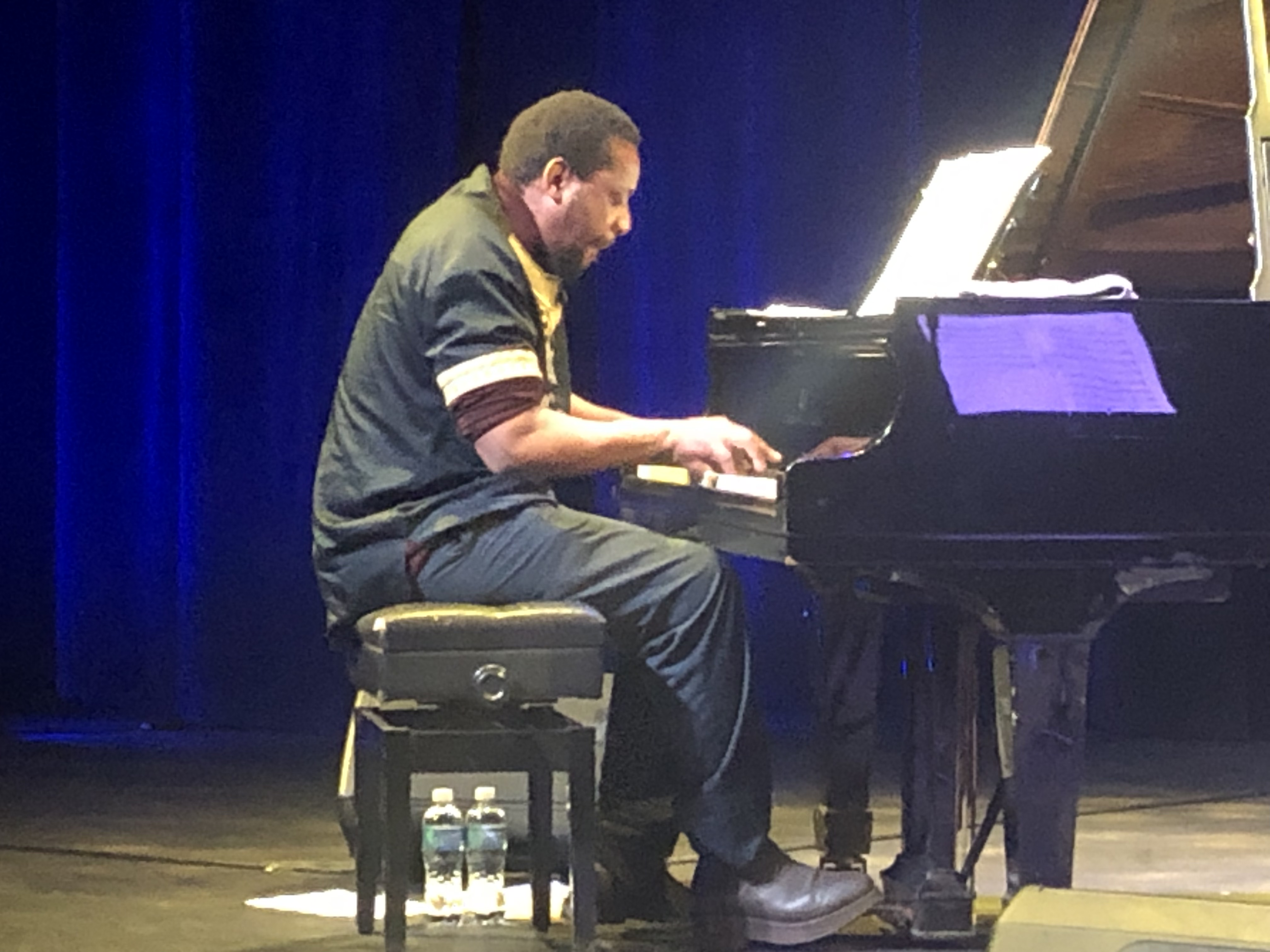
- Afrika Mkhize performing with Rainmakers at the Johannesburg Market Theatre in 2023.
- Born: Afrika Mkhize
- Musical career
- Genres: Jazz, jazz fusion, mbaqanga

Afrika Mkhize is a South African Jazz pianist and composer. He is known for his contributions to the Cape Jazz and South African jazz scene. Mkhize has worked with various renowned musicians such as Miriam Makeba, Sibongile Khumalo, and Hugh Masekela. He has also released his own albums, including "Rainbow Nation" and "African Jazz and Percussion." Mkhize's music is often a fusion of jazz, African rhythms, and elements of South African traditional music. Mkhize comes from a musical family and is the son of renowned South Jazz pianist Themba Mkhize.
