= The Turn (Taxi Violence album) =

Studio album by Taxi Violence
- Released: 2009
- Label: Independent

Taxi Violence chronology
| Untie Yourself (2006) | The Turn (2009) | Unplugged: Long Way From Home (2011) |

The Turn is the second studio album by South African rock band Taxi Violence, released in August 2009.

== Track listing ==
| No. | Title | Length |
|---|---|---|
| 1. | "Mezousa" |
| 2. | "Venus Fly Trap" |
| 3. | "Heads Or Tails" |
| 4. | "Depth Of Feel" |
| 5. | "Devil 'n Pistol" |
| 6. | "Valley Of Shadows" |
| 7. | "Hold 'em Or Fold 'em" |
| 8. | "Waste Not" |
| 9. | "The Turn" |
| 10. | "Lose That Halo" |
| 11. | "Seven Shots" |
| 12. | "Death To Hollywood" |
| 13. | "Van My Sinne Beroof" |
| 14. | "Churchgoin' Man" |
