= Trains to Taung =

Studio album by Paul Hanmer
- Released: 1997
- Genre: Jazz
- Length: 109:45
- Label: Sheer Sound
- Producer: Andrew Smith

Paul Hanmer chronology
| Trains to Taung (1997) | Window to Elsewhere (1998) |

Trains to Taung is the debut album by South African jazz pianist Paul Hanmer. The album combines jazz with African music.

== History ==
A native of Cape Town, Hanmer said thoughts of identity influenced the creation of the album. He used marabi chords because "they are very simple, age-old blocks...a basic format for so much music that has come out of this country...in a way that, say, twelve-bar blues has become a format for so much music that comes out of America...the 12/8 groove—how slow it was—reminded me of a train. I thought of a train going back in time, to that place that marks how ancient is the African human heritage: Taung...the place where the Khoisan made the ancient elements of music, and the place where marabi came about is probably one and the same...it's an imagined space and time." He recorded the album with Louis Mhlanga and Jethro Shasha, both from Zimbabwe.

== Track listing ==
1. "Meeting of the Women" – 5:07
2. "Consciencelessness" – 7:12
3. "Prop Hat" – 9:00
4. "Umhlangano" – 5:31
5. "Chef's Groove" – 9:20
6. "Trains to Taung" – 11:25
7. "Tempo Di Bhutto" – 4:55
8. "Slow Samba" – 8:07
9. "Meeting of the Women" (Reprise) – 9:04

== Personnel ==
- Paul Hanmer – piano
- Louis Mhlanga – electric guitar
- Denis Lalouette – bass guitar
- André Abrahamse – fretless bass
- Jethro Shasha – drums
- Neill Ettridge – drums
- Basi Mahlasela – percussion
