= Kunle =

Kúnlé is a male Yoruba given name, meaning "to fill/Full." It is normally a diminutive of longer names like "Oluwakunle" (Full of Grace) or "Adekunle" (Full of Royalty), "Olakúnlé" (Full of wealth), and others. Notable people with the given name include:

- Kunle Adejuyigbe (born 1977), Nigerian sprinter
- Kunle Afolayan (born 1974), Nigerian actor, film producer and director
- Kunle Ajayi (born 1964), Nigerian gospel singer, songwriter, saxophonist and televangelist
- Kunle Ajibade (born 1958), Nigerian journalist, editor and author
- Kunle Dada-Luke (born 2000), Canadian soccer player
- Kunle Filani (born 1957), Nigerian educator and artist
- Kunle Olukotun, American electrical engineer
- Kunle Remi, Nigerian actor
- Kunle Adeyanju, Nigerian professional motorcyclist
