= Pops Mohamed =

South African jazz musician (1949–2025)

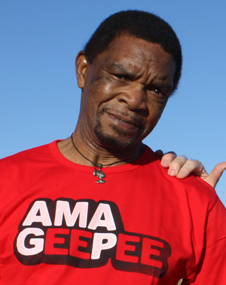
- Mohamed in 2011

Background information
- Born: Ismail Mohamed-Jan; 10 December 1949; Benoni, South Africa
- Died: 4 December 2025 (aged 75) Boksburg, South Africa
- Genres: Gospel; Jazz; Kwela; Pop; Soul; World Music; Afro Jazz
- Occupations: Musician; Multi-Instrumentalist; Producer; Composer; Sound Engineer
- Instruments: Berimbau; Didgeridoo; Guitar; Keyboard; Kora; Mbira; Uhadi; Mrhubhe
- Labels: Sun Music Company; M.E.L.T. 2000; Sheer Sound

Ismail Mohamed-Jan (10 December 1949 – 4 December 2025), known professionally as Pops Mohamed, was a South African multi-instrumentalist, jazz musician and producer.

== Life and career ==
Mohamed was born on 10 December 1949 in Benoni, Gauteng. He had a career in music that came from an early exposure at Dorkay House to the likes of Abdullah Ibrahim and Kippie Moeketsi. Mohamed's father was a Muslim of Portuguese and Indian heritage and his mother was of Xhosa and Khoisan heritage. He grew up in Johannesburg. He started his first band The Valiants, at the age of 14. Known by fans as the "Minister of Music". He played multiple musical instruments, including the African mouth bow, bird whistle, berimbau, didgeridoo, guitar, keyboard, kora, and the thumb piano. He was also known for his wide range of musical styles which include kwela, pop, and soul. He produced Finding One's Self, the late Moses Taiwa Molelekwa's award-winning album.

Pops received a lifetime achievement award in 2023 at the 29th Annual South African Music Awards.

Pops also performed regularly with and sat on the board of the Johannesburg Youth Orchestra Company.

Pops had three children, seven grandchildren and three great-grandchildren. He died on 4 December 2025, at the age of 75.

== Discography ==
- Kalamazoo – 1991
- Sophiatown Society – 1992 (with Morris Goldberg)
- Ancestral Healing – 1995
- How Far Have We Come – 1996
- Music With No Name – 1996
- Society Vibes – 1997 (with McCoy Mrubatha)
- Timeless – 1997
- Millennium Experience – 2000 (with Zena Edwards)
- Pops Mohamed Meets "The LondonSound Collective" – 1999
- Africa Meltdown – 2001
- Yesterday, Today And Tomorrow – 2002
- Mood Africa – 2005
