= McCoy Mrubata =

South African jazz saxophonist

- Born: McCoy Mrubata; 1959 (age 66–67); Langa, Cape Town, South Africa
- Genres: Cape Jazz, African jazz
- Occupations: Saxophonist; flautist; composer; bandleader; teacher
- Instruments: Saxophone, flute, pennywhistle
- Years active: 1980s–present
- Labels: Zomba Records; Sheer Sound

McCoy Mrubata (born 1959) is a South African jazz saxophonist.

== Biography ==
McCoy Mrubata was born in 1959 in the township of Langa, Cape Town, South Africa. He was surrounded in childhood by many African hymns, from the sounds of Zion churches to the brassy music of the Merry Macs band who rehearsed opposite his home. With the difficulty of living under the apartheid government and the 1976 Soweto uprising, McCoy left school and followed his music passion. His instrument then was flute, which he studied informally under the likes of Madoda Gxabeka, the Ngcukanas, Winston Ngozi, Ezra, and many Langa greats.

In the early 1980s, Mrubata played with many cover bands such as Fever, Touch and Airborne, from where he moved to crossover outfit Louis and the Jive. While touring in the 1980s, he was spotted by bandleader Sipho "Hotstix" Mabuse, who helped him make Johannesburg his home. As Mrubata grew into playing a wider range of reeds and composing more, he engaged with many other bands and that led to the opportunity of a recording deal by producer Koloi Lebona with a British-based record company named Zomba Records in 1988. The same company had produced, among others, Jonathan Butler and Billy Ocean. The following year Mrubata released his debut album Firebird and went on to form Brotherhood, a band with names such as guitarist Jimmy Dludlu, pianist Nhlanhla Magagula and Lucas Khumalo, winning the Gilbey's Music for Africa prize in 1990.

In 1992, Mrubata joined Hugh Masekela’s Lerapo and toured the world, playing alongside guitarist Lawrence Matshiza and pianist Moses Molelekwa. Mrubata continued creating his own bands, including Cape to Cairo and McCoy and Friends. In the mid-1990s, he made the first of a series of albums as a leader, with Face the Music winning the 2003 South African Music Award (SAMA) in the Traditional Jazz category and Icamagu Livumile winning the same award in 2005. Besides his international musical journey, Mrubata also did some scoring work for South African productions about journalist Bloke Modisane, and in 2001 starred in a Norwegian production based on the life of John Coltrane. In June 2007, Mrubata travelled with Paul Hanmer to Congo DR and Kinshasa to participate in conducting music workshops with Belgian and Congolese musicians for a local jazz festival. In 2008, he won his third SAMA in the category Best Traditional Jazz Album for his album The Brasskap Sessions Volume 1.

Mrubata's current music involvement includes producing and teaching. His ambition is to keep South African music alive at home and share his South African experiences through music with the rest of the continent and the world at large.

He is married with four kids and currently lives in Johannesburg.
