= African Renaissance Ensemble =

Instrumental and vocal ensemble

The African Renaissance Ensemble
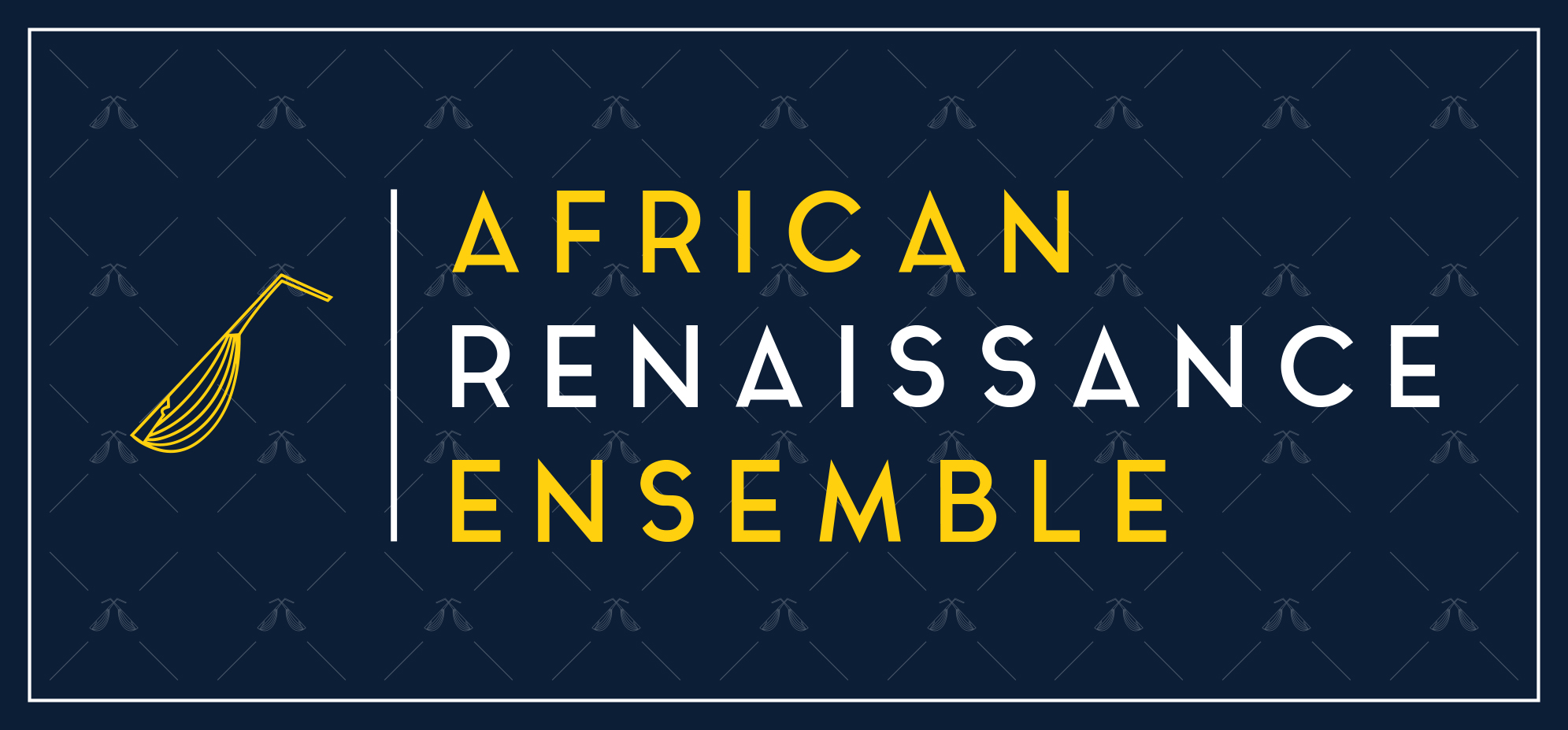

Background information
- Origin: Johannesburg, South Africa
- Genres: Renaissance and Baroque music
- Instruments: Baroque violins, viola, cello and contrabass Recorders and traversos Cornetto and sackbutts Lute, theorbo, baroque guitar and baroque mandolin Voices; Percussion
- Years active: 2017–present
- Members: Adam H. Golding (founder and musical director); Dillon Davie (co-founder); John Reid Coulter (continuo) Hilton Anspach, Kaleem Ahmid, Isabella Bonnet, Andrew Gould, Doron Kanar, Glynnis Kanar, Esther Lategan, Caleb Lester, Handri Loots, Este Meerkotter, Bryan Moore, Leigh Nudelman, Ute Smythe, Tanya Spiller, Jesse Stevens, John Warner
- Website: earlymusic.co.za

The African Renaissance Ensemble is a South African musical ensemble specializing in the music of the Renaissance and Baroque periods. The group was founded in Johannesburg by multi-instrumentalist and conductor Adam H. Golding and his collaborator, Dillon Davie. The ensemble regularly performs in Johannesburg and tours.

The group consists of a 5-part string consort, a 4-part wind consort, a 4-part brass consort, a vocal ensemble and continuo. The ensemble's goal is to spread awareness and love for early music and its performances are informed by historical practices, using period style instruments wherever possible.

While the group roots its practice in historically informed practices, the goal of the group is to present early music in an exciting format to generate interest among modern audiences

== Instruments ==
The ensemble tries as far as possible to perform on period-appropriate instruments. This includes some original instruments and a number of copies. All of the string players players perform on gut strings with baroque style bows.

== History ==
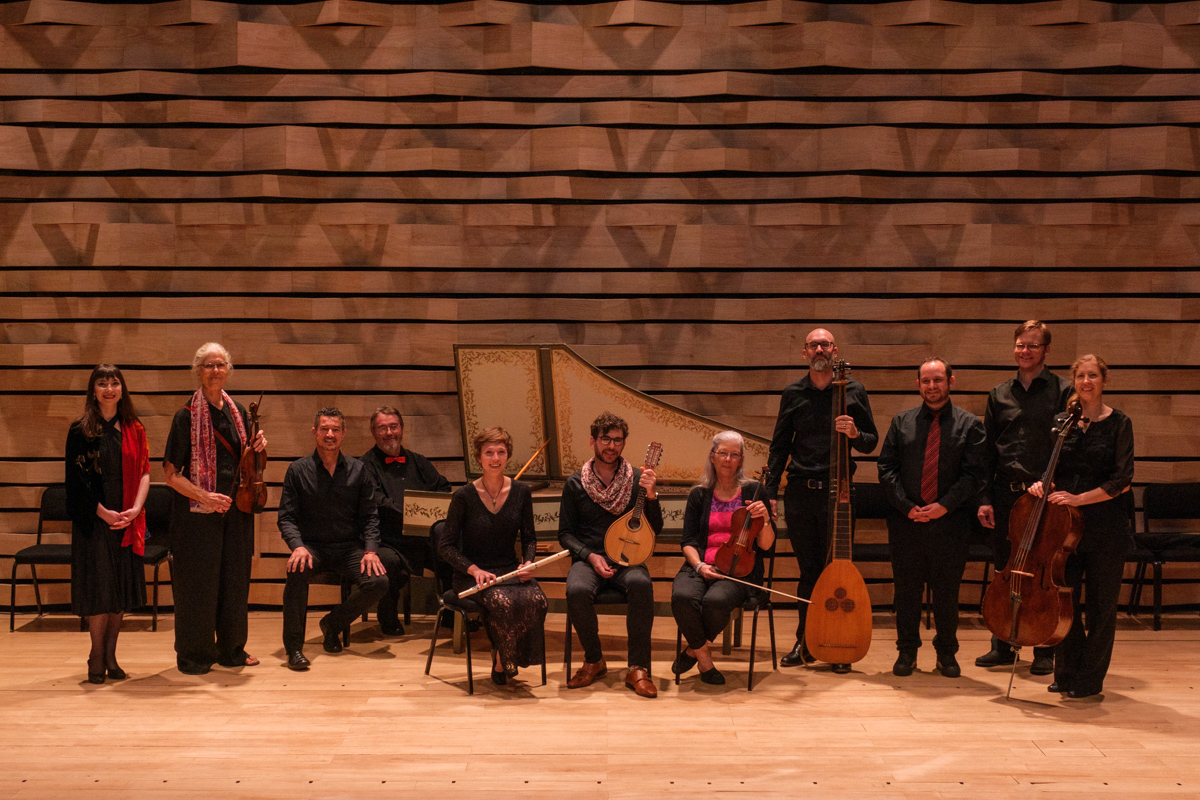
The African Renaissance Ensemble at the Hidden Treasures of the Hebrew Baroque programme, Johannesburg

In 2023, the ensemble collaborated with The Lewandowski Chorale a non-denominational choir dedicated to the performance of Jewish Liturgical music on a programme entitled Hidden Treasures of the Hebrew Baroque celebrating the 400th anniversary of the publication of Salomone Rossi's seminal work, Hashirim Asher l'Shlomo. This included performances in Johannesburg and Pretoria, as well as a tour to Cape Town.

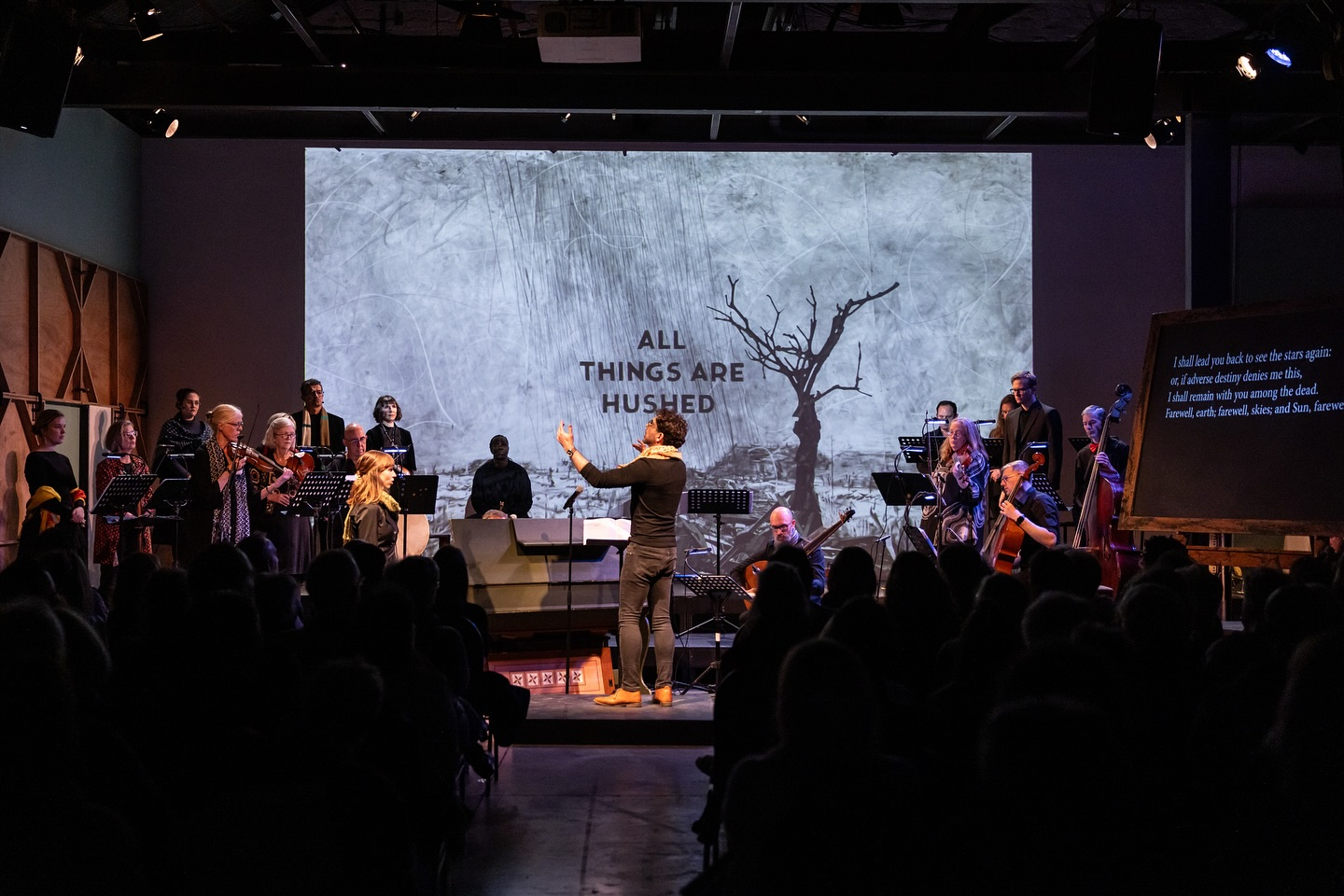
Thinking in Monteverdi - The African Renaissance Ensemble performs excerpts from Monteverdi's l'Orfeo with animations by William Kentridge.

In 2025, the ensemble collaborated with William Kentridge, Neo Muyanga, and The Centre for the Less Good Idea on a multi-disciplinary project, "Thinking in Monteverdi". exploring animations that Kentridge was preparing for the first ever performance of Claudio Monteverdi's l'Orfeo at the Glyndebourne Festival.
