= Kunle Adeyanju =

Nigerian adventurer, author, entrepreneur and humanitarian

- Born: Offa, Kwara State, Nigeria
- Education: Ahmadu Bello University; University of Arizona
- Occupations: Adventurer, Author, Entrepreneur, Humanitarian
- Known for: London–Lagos Motorbike Ride; Rotary Humanitarian Service Projects

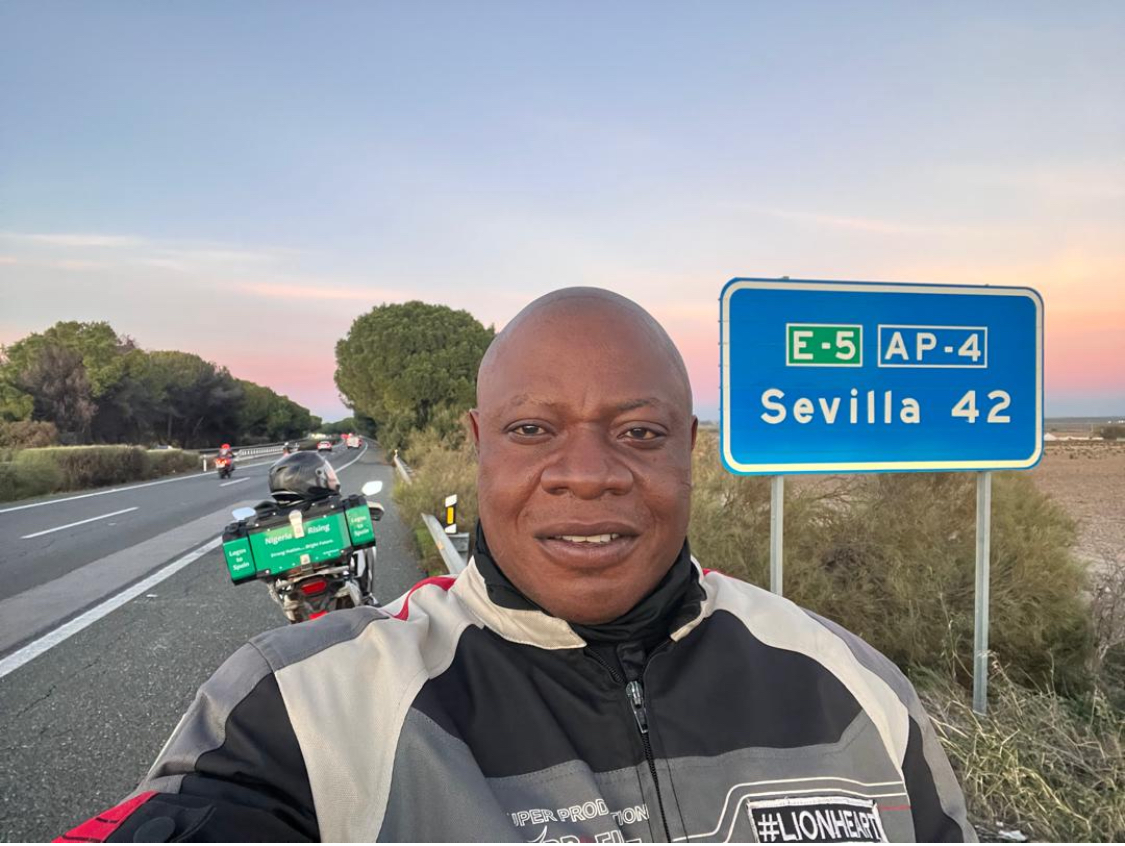
Lagos to Spain Adventure

Kunle Adeyanju is a Nigerian adventurer, author, businessman and humanitarian known for his long-distance motorcycling expeditions, including the 2022 London to Lagos trans-Sahara ride to raise awareness for polio eradication. He is also a Rotarian, public speaker and the founder of the LionHeart Foundation.

Adeyanju was the President of the Rotary Club of Ikoyi Metro, D9110 in the 2022/23 Rotary Year.

Adeyanju is a self-described daredevil who has skydived, bungee jumped, jet skied on the Indian Ocean, climbed Mount Kilimanjaro twice and rode a bicycle from Lagos to Accra and back to Lagos in six days. In 2022, he rode a motorcycle from London to Lagos, Nigeria. The journey took him approximately, forty-one days; he travelled 13,000 kilometres (8,100 mi) through 11 countries and 31 cities before he arrived at his final destination Lagos, Nigeria. The goal behind his London–Lagos ride was "to raise funds for Rotary International's fight against polio, which remains a threat in Africa despite being eradicated in 2020." He says he chose the cause because of a childhood friend who was a polio survivor but died years ago. Kunle Adeyanju's ride brought him through the Tizi n'Tichka pass at the summit of the Atlas Mountains, and on to a crossing of the Sahara Desert where he faced temperatures of 53 °C (127 °F). Riding at cusp of the national speed limit of Morocco and Mauritania, he crossed the Sahara in seven days.

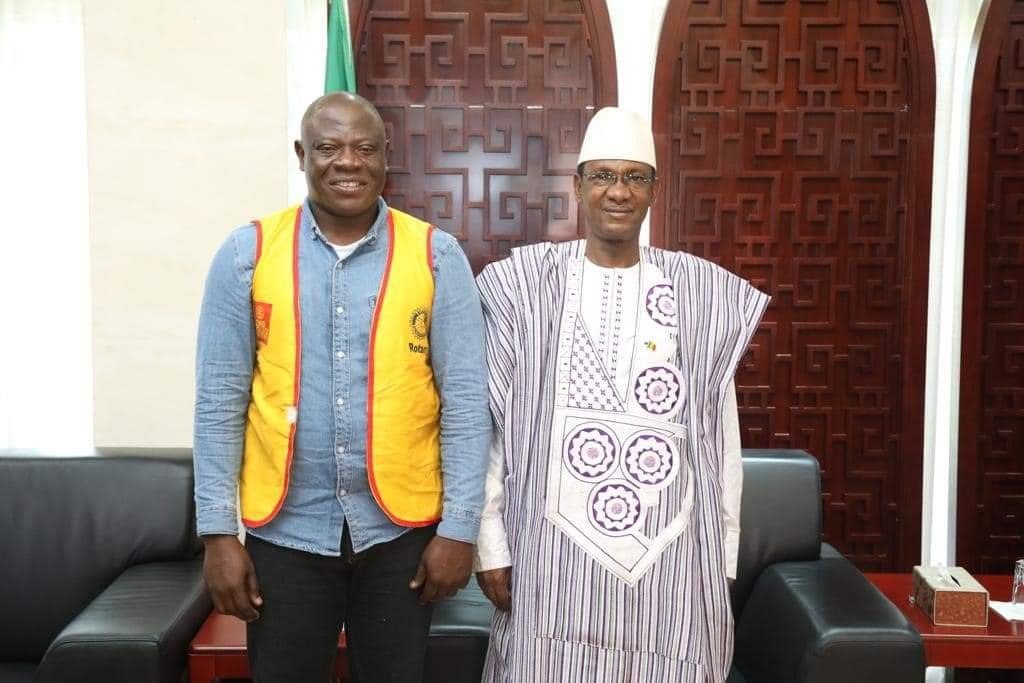
Reception by His Excellency, The Prime Minister of The Republic of Mali

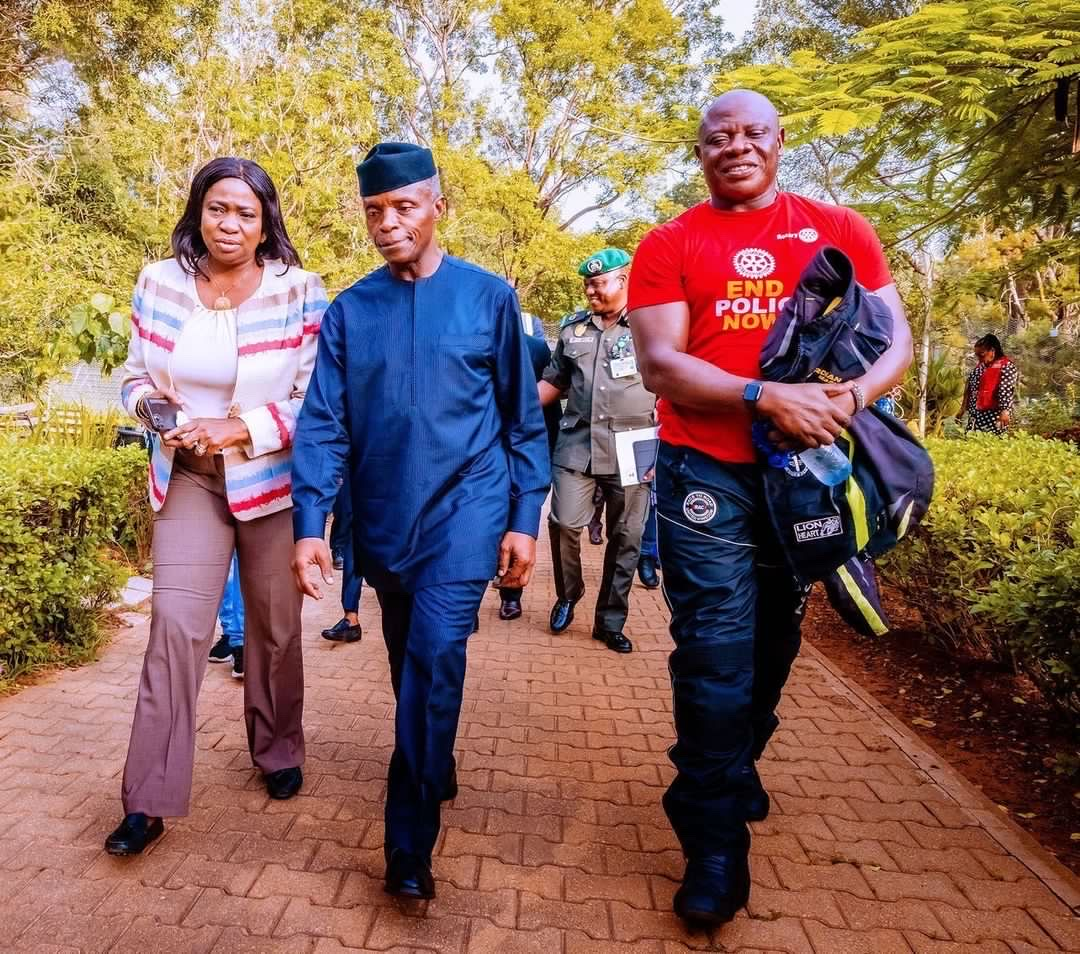
Reception by His Excellency The Vice-President of The Federal Republic of Nigeria

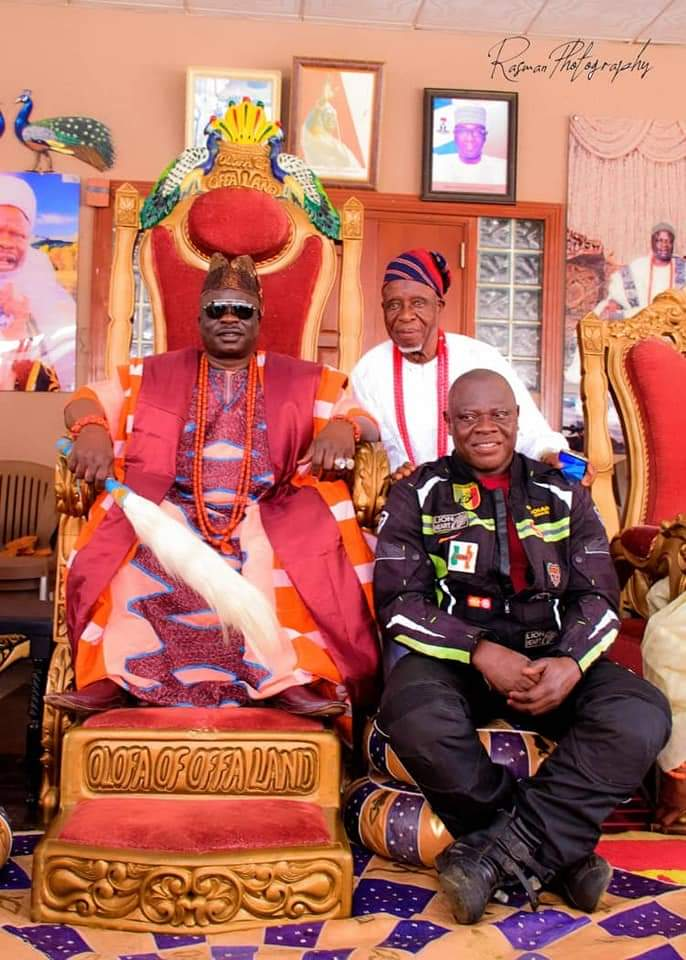
Reception by His Royal Highness, The Olofa of Offa

== Early life and education ==
Adeyanju is a native of Offa, Kwara State, Nigeria. He completed his nursery, primary and secondary education in Kano before attending Ahmadu Bello University (ABU), Zaria. While at ABU, he served as the Financial Secretary of the Students’ Union Government and held several leadership positions in the Rotaract Club of ABU Zaria Main Campus, including Publicity Director, Club Service Director and Vice-President.

He holds a Master of Business Administration (MBA) and a Master of Arts in Peace and Strategic Studies. Adeyanju is currently pursuing a PhD in Business Administration with a specialisation in Social Entrepreneurism at the University of Arizona.

== Career ==
=== Corporate career ===
Kunle Adeyanju began his professional career as a Management Trainee with British American Tobacco Nigeria. He later served as Marketing Manager for the Kano Region, overseeing operations in Kano, Kaduna, Jigawa and Katsina States.

In 2004, he joined Oando Gas & Power as Head of Marketing (2004–2006), where he led the development and expansion of the Greater Lagos Industrial Area Natural Gas Pipeline Network.

In 2006, LionHeart joined Royal Dutch Shell, where he held several roles, including:

- Contract Holder – Land Logistics
- Dedicated Contract Lead – Logistics
- Logistics Strategic Projects & Assurance Lead
- Strategic & Tactical Contract Lead

=== Entrepreneurship ===
In 2019, Kunle Adeyanju founded Pelicans D.N.O – Venture Capital, where he is Chief Operating Officer.

== Adventures and expeditions ==
LionHeart is known for his adventure travel and endurance missions. He has visited more than 85 countries, and his hobbies include swimming, cycling, mountain climbing and reading. He has skydived, bungee jumped and completed a Lagos–Ghana–Lagos cycling expedition.

In 2008, he became the first Nigerian to fly the Nigerian flag at Uhuru Peak, Mount Kilimanjaro, and the first Rotarian to fly the Rotary International banner at the summit.

In December 2009, he made a second attempt on Kilimanjaro with his team. The expedition was abandoned due to extreme weather conditions, an experience referred to as the "Failed but Successful Mission." The story was later published in his book My Escapes on Kili.

=== London to Lagos Ride (2022) ===
In April 2022, LionHeart undertook the #LondonToLagos trans-Sahara motorbike adventure to raise awareness and funds for the End Polio campaign. The journey received global recognition for its humanitarian impact.

=== 2025 Road Trip to Spain and London ===
In December 2025, Kunle Adeyanju embarked on a month-long road trip to Spain as a vacation from work. He rode his new Honda Africa Twin 1100 Adventure, which he named "The Beast," across several countries in West Africa, including **Benin, Togo, Burkina Faso, Côte d’Ivoire, Senegal, Mauritania,** and **Morocco**, before arriving in Spain.

The journey included diverse landscapes and cultural experiences. In Benin, he navigated bustling urban streets, while Togo offered scenic coastal routes. Burkina Faso provided open savannahs, and Côte d’Ivoire presented a mix of urban and rural landscapes. In Senegal, Adeyanju enjoyed smoother highways and lighter traffic, whereas Mauritania challenged him with vast desert stretches. Morocco featured mountainous terrain and busy medinas before he crossed into Spain.

After reaching Spain, Adeyanju extended his trip through **France** and eventually rode to **London**, transforming a planned vacation into a transcontinental adventure.

== Rotary International ==
Adeyanju has been a member of Rotary International since 2006 and is a Past President of the Rotary Club of Ikoyi Metro (District 9110). He has also served as a Board Member, Service Projects Director and Publicity Director.

He is the recipient of several Rotary and humanitarian awards, including:

- Nigerian National PolioPlus Ambassador
- Rotary International Service Award for Africa (2023)
- District Governor 9110 Golden Award (2023)
- District Governor 9125 Distinguished Award (2023)
- Rotaract District 9110 Award of Excellence (2023)
- Rotary District 9130 Award of Excellence
- Distinguished Rotarian – Rotary District 9110
- Rotarian of the Year (2008) – Rotary District 9110 DG’s Award

== Awards and recognition ==
Kunle Adeyanju has received several honours locally and internationally, including:

- Federal Government of Nigeria Diaspora Merit Award (2023)
- International Olympic Committee Award for Exceptional Leadership

== Publications ==
Kunle Adeyanju is the author of several books, including:

- Great Thinkers
- Winner Mindset
- #LondonToLagos – The Journey of a LionHeart
- West African Road Trip – The Diary of a LionHeart
- My Escapes on Kili

His works are available on Apple Books, Amazon, Google Books and other major bookstores.

== Philanthropy ==
Kunle Adeyanju is the founder of the LionHeart Foundation, a charity focused on education, health, environmental sustainability and community development.

== See also ==
- End Polio
- Rotary International
- Adventure motorcycling
- Mount Kilimanjaro
