= Moses Taiwa Molelekwa =

South African jazz pianist

Moses Taiwa Molelekwa (17 April 1973 – 13 February 2001) was a South African jazz pianist.

== Early life ==
Moses Taiwa Molelekwa grew up in a family of jazz musicians. He was brought up in the town of Tembisa, situated in the province of Gauteng, South Africa.

== Career ==
In the 1980s he played with Miriam Makeba, Jonas Gwangwa, and others. In 1988 Hugh Masekela asked him to join his bands and this period saw Molelekwa winning the first of several awards. His solo career began in 1994 with the debut album Finding Oneself. By 1996 he had gained widespread attention as a solo artist, winning two FNB South Africa Music Awards for traditional jazz, and was heralded as the successor for the great Marabi piano tradition, following in the footsteps of the prolific Abdullah Ibrahim.

He also played outside South African tradition or society. He played at the North Sea Jazz Festival and worked with Brazilian singer Flora Purim on his second album. He also did work beyond jazz as a producer for the Kwaito group TKZee. Molelekwa named Herbie Hancock, Bheki Mseleku, and Abdullah Ibrahim as major influences on his music.

== Death ==
The following years saw other successes, but on 13 February 2001 he and his wife Florence "Flo" Mtoba were found dead. He had been hanged, while she had been strangled to death. They had an eight-year-old son at the time.

== Publications ==
Although Molelekwa has great acclaim from critics and musicians alike, little has been written about this pianist and composer. In 2021, author Phehello Mofokeng published a reflective essay entitled A Note To Taiwa, which celebrates the music and legacy of Moses Taiwa Molelekwa.

== Discography ==
=== Albums ===
- Finding One's self (1995)
- Genes and Spirits (1998)
- Wa Mpona (2002)
- Darkness Pass (2004)
- Live in Johannesburg nineteen ninety nine (2010)

== See also ==
- Moses Khumalo
