= Judith Sephuma =

South African singer (born 1974)

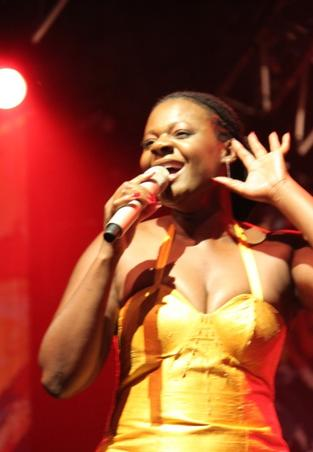

Background information
- Born: 29 June 1974 (age 52); Seshego, Limpopo, South Africa
- Genres: Jazz, gospel
- Occupation: Singer
- Label: Lalomba Music
- Website: www.judithsephumamusic.com

Judith Sephuma (born 29 June 1974) is a South African jazz and Afro-pop singer.

== Biography ==
Born in Seshego, she was raised in Polokwane, Limpopo, and moved to Cape Town in 1994 to study as a jazz vocalist. In 1997, she graduated from the University of Cape Town with a Performer's Diploma in Jazz and went on to further study. In 1999, she won the "Best Jazz Vocalist" at the Old Mutual Jazz Into The Future competition and signed with the African division of BMG.

Her debut album A Cry, A Smile, A Dance (2001) was critically acclaimed and she followed it up with New Beginnings in 2005. Her other albums include Change is Here (2008), I Am A Living Testimony (2011), A Legacy Live in Concert (2012; CD and DVD), and her 2013 debut gospel album titled The Experience LIVE in Concert with some songs produced by Wilson Joel (CD and DVD). In 2015 she released her album One Word, which she describes as Afro-Funk Jazz. Her following album, My Worship - Live, was released in 2017.

In 2019, after a two-year discovery period, she released her most recent album, titled 'Power of Dreams', which she has described as "Following a two year journey of self- rediscovery, after the release of her eight album in 2017, The Queen of Afro Jazz, Judith Sephuma, has come back to provoke thoughts and emotions through music with her latest Afro Jazz album titled Power of Dreams." some of the songs included are the album are "power of dreams", "neither of us", and "Ntshwarele".

She is recorded and marketed through her independent record label, Lalomba Music.
