= Themba Mkhize =

South African jazz musician

Themba Mkhize is a South African jazz pianist and composer. Born in KwaZulu Natal, Mkhizehas played with South African bands including Bayethe and Sakhile.

== Early years ==
Mkhize's interest in music was sparked at an early age. Over the years he has shared the stage with a number of South African as well as international artists. Mkhize's son Afrika is also a well established pianist.
