= Paul Hanmer =

South African jazz pianist

Paul Hanmer (born 1961, Cape Town) is a South African jazz pianist.

== Career ==
As a child he studied piano. He attended the University of Cape Town for two years before beginning a music career with guitarist Paul Petersen. During the 1980s he started the band Unofficial Language with Peter Sklair and Ian Herman in Johannesburg. In the 1990s he was a member of the Cool Friction Band led by Tony Cox. His debut album, Trains to Taung, was released by Sheer Sound in 1997. Influenced by Keith Jarrett, he has worked with Miriam Makeba, Louis Mhlanga, Pops Mohamed, McCoy Mrubata, Ray Phiri, and Tananas.

== Discography ==
- Trains to Taung (Sheer Sound, 1997)
- Playola (Sheer Sound, 2000)
- Window to Elsewhere (Sheer Sound, 2002)
- Water and Lights (Gallo Record Company, 1997)
- The Navisha Sessions (Gallo Record Company Vault, 2002)

== See also ==
- Cape jazz
