= Jimmy Dludlu =

Mozambican jazz guitarists (born 1966)

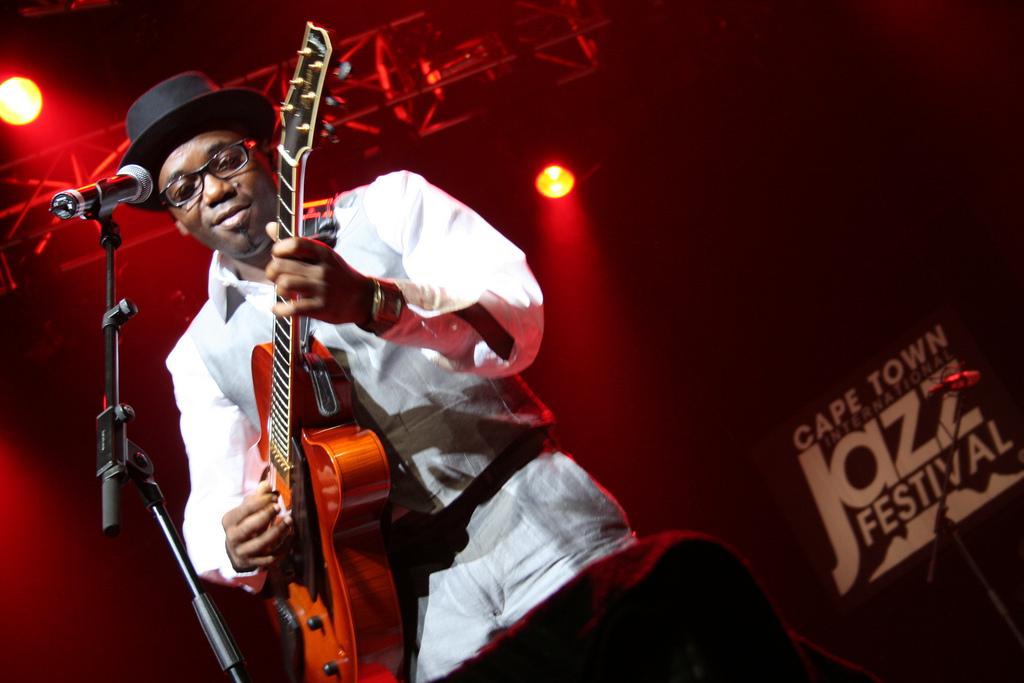
- Jimmy Dludlu in concert

Background information
- Born: 1966 (age 59–60); Mozambique
- Genre: Jazz
- Instrument: Guitar
- Years active: 1997–present

Jimmy Dludlu (born 1966) is a Mozambican jazz musician.

== Early life ==
Dludlu was born in Mozambique and grew up there and in South Africa, Namibia, Botswana, and Zimbabwe. He started playing guitar at 13 years old, teaching himself with a homemade guitar. His style encompasses a wide range of influences, combining both traditional and modern elements of jazz, inspired by Wes Montgomery, George Benson , Pat Metheny to South African heroes such as Miriam Makeba, Letta Mbulu, Hugh Masekela, Themba Mokwena and Allen Kwela, among others. Dludlu is particularly fond of the sounds of West and Central Africa, as well as Latin America, but states that jazz remains his favorite. His many original compositions fall into the tradition that can be loosely classified as Afro-jazz.

Jimmy Dludlu's debut album, Echoes from the Past (PolyGram, 1997), was released in September 1997 to widespread critical acclaim. The album earned Jimmy two FNB SAMA Awards for "Best Newcomer" and "Best Contemporary Jazz Album" in 1998, and sales figures in January 1999 indicated sales of over 250,000 records. The album has since been released by the Verve Records label in nine countries, including the United States, Italy, Switzerland, Sweden and Hungary.

== Awards ==
- South African Music Award "Best Newcomer" 1997.
- South African Music Award "Best Contemporary Jazz Album" 1998.
- Metro FM Award "Best Jazz Album".
- South African Music Award Lifetime Achievement Award 2022.

== Discography ==
=== Albums ===
- Echoes from the Past (1997)
- Essence of Rhythm (2000)
- Afrocentric (11 March 2002)
- Corners of my Soul (2005)
- Portrait (17 September 2007)
- Sound And Vision (29 Augustus 2008)
- In The Groove (2 March 2016)

=== Singles ===
- Winds of Change
