= Black Noise (group) =

Black Noise music entertainment is a hip-hop crew hailing from the Cape Flats in Cape Town, South Africa, which gained street popularity, primarily after the group chose to reach out to Cape Flats youth with the inclusion of members from Mitchell's Plain. The crew, along with Prophets of Da City (POC), is credited with being a pioneer of Cape Town's 'conscious' hip-hop scene in the late 80s and early 90s. The crew's line-up has changed significantly since the early 90s, but Emile YX? (aka Emile Jansen) has been the crew's mainstay. Black Noise is South Africa's oldest active hip-hop crew and Jansen, born on 20 July 1968 in Cape Town, has been instrumental in employing Black Noise for youth development initiatives, such as workshops for township youth. He went on to establish a non-profit organisation called Heal the Hood and launched landmark hip-hop events; these include the annual Hip-Hop Indaba, African Battle Cry and Shut Up and Dance. The crew has conducted workshops and performed extensively in South Africa as well as in a number of European countries. Jansen and Black Noise have also launched a number of albums, DVDs, poetry anthologies (including the work of school pupils and established hip-hop artists) and books.

His work on eTVs "Step Up or Step Out" gave him the chance to judge dance competitions and work with the youth. Furthermore, he has helped to raise money and sent 177 young people to travel to international events globally. He has recorded and released 12 albums with Black Noise, 6 solo Emile YX? Albums, 1 Afrikaaps soundtrack, 9 compilation albums, 7 Heal the Hood compilation albums and helped 6 local artists release their solo albums. Emile started South Africa's first Hip Hop magazine “Da Juice” and wrote 3 books. He also helped graffiti artists Falko and Mak1 to release their own magazines and a compilation of Rhymes, Articles, Poetry, Short Stories and Sketches (R.A.P.S.S. #1) Emile also created plays and was part of the creating team of Afrikaaps, Ons Bou, Mixing It Up, Break Hip Hop Dance Theatre play, Stompie Garage play.

Emile started break-dancing in 1982 with Pop Glide Crew. So he became one of the first South African bboys, which made him a pioneer of South African Hip Hop. Six years after that, in 1986, he made it to the regional finals of the Shell Road to Fame with “the Chill Convention", who later that year became the legendary South African Hip Hop Group Black Noise. In addition Emile Jansen qualified as a school teacher and started teaching at Battswood Primary. In 1989 the group won the Mayors Award for Greening the city. Two years later Emile and Black Noise self- funded a tour to JHB to explore their own record deal and performed with Brenda Fassie & Marc Alex. In 1992 Black Noise signed a record deal with Tusk Records and released Black Noise 1st Album "Pumpin' Loose Da Juice". The album was created around the same time that the world of hip hop goes from Public Enemy to the gangster era.

Black Noise helped with Voters Education before South Africa's first democratic election campaign in 1994. At the Inauguration of Nelson Mandela, Black Noise performed in Cape Town to support the democratisation process of South Africa. In the same year Emile attends Universal Zulu (Hip Hop) Nation Anniversary in New York to spread the ideas of South African Hip Hop. Two members, Warro and Ernie, left the group before the 3rd Album "Black Facts" was released in St Louis Missouri.

1995 Emile & Black Noise were part of a movie about youth globally called "Juvenis" and performed in Sweden for the UN 50th Anniversary. Falko joins BN for 4th element of hip hop. Adidas offered the group a Sponsorship, which Black Noise accepted.

In 1997 Black Noise won the 3rd place at World Break-dance Championships in Germany. Since 1997 Black Noise released seven more Albums.

In 2001 they released an album called Circles of Fire. It is an ode to Capoeira, the martial art of Brazilian slaves; the 'circle of fire' is the sacred space in which this martial art is performed. Black Noise tried to mix the rhythms of Capoeira with urban South African hip hop styles. 'Don't speak, just listen', is an a cappella track talking about gangsterism in Cape Town. The standout track on the album is a remake of Bob Marley's 'Could you be loved'. Like POC, Black Noise's live act includes MCs, DJs and b-boy performances. They have also included live music components at certain events.

== Recognition ==
Black Noise's Emile Jansen features in the 2010 South African feature, The Creators. In the film, Emile teaches bboy workshops to Cape Flat youth, leads a group of South Africans on a trek up Table Mountain, and spearheads the first African Hip Hop Indaba. Members of Black Noise are also supporting the Heal the Hood Organisation, which tries to teach young adolescents self-confidence and encourage them developing own ideas.
