= Danny K =

South African singer-songwriter and actor

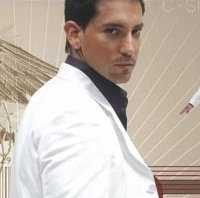

Background information
- Born: Daniel Koppel; 8 September 1977 (age 48); Johannesburg, South Africa
- Genres: Pop; R&B
- Label: J23

Daniel Koppel (born 8 September 1977), known professionally as Danny K, is a South African singer, songwriter and actor.

== Early life and education ==
He was raised by Jewish parents, Gavin and Pam Koppel in Johannesburg. He is the eldest of their three children and was educated at King David School, a private Jewish Day School in Linksfield. He later graduated from Wits University with a Bachelor of Arts degree in Law. He later attended Wits Business School at the university and obtained a postgraduate diploma in management.

== Career ==
Danny has been nominated multiple times for a SAMA (South African Music Award) and has won four times. He has two consecutive Kids Choice Awards, two consecutive Crystal Awards (People's Choice Awards), YOU magazine Award for Best South African Musician, and The South African STYLE Award. Danny was also voted number 34 in the Heat Magazine's Hot 100 for 2007. He was voted by First National Bank's national survey as one of South Africa's few role models, as well as South Africa's most trustworthy 100 public personalities by Reader's Digest, where he took 1st place, which saw the pot of R100 000 donated to Compassionate Friends, a grief-counseling service in memory of his late brother.

In 2021, he made a guest appearance, starring as himself in the Jewish-themed South African comedy series, Tali's Baby Diary on Showmax.

In November 2024, he revealed that he had ended his five-year recording hiatus and was set to release a new single.

== Personal life ==
In 2012, Koppel married Lisa Gundelfinger; they had two sons and one daughter together. On August 10, 2026, it was announced that Gundelfinger had died from colorectal cancer at the age of 41.

== Awards ==
Won
Award	Granting Body	Place	Year
Best Pop Album for Same Difference	SAMA	Johannesburg	2007
Best Pop Album for This Is My Time	SAMA	Johannesburg	2007
Best Collaboration (with Mandoza)	Channel O		2006
Best S.A. Musician	YOU magazine	Johannesburg	
Best Dressed Male	S.A. Style	Johannesburg	
Best South African Artist	Kids' Choice Awards	Johannesburg	
Nominated
Award	Granting body	Place	Year
Best Pop	MTV Africa Music Awards 2014	Durban	2014

== Discography ==
=== Albums ===
Album Information
Danny K – 2000
- Track list:
- 1. You Don't Know My Name
- 2. Getting Down
- 3. Hurts So Bad
- 4. Bull$*@!
- 5. Cheatin
- 6. My Destiny
- 7. Too Young (To Hurt So Bad)
- 8. Senorita
- 9. So Many Ways (feat. TK)
- 10. Boom Boom
- 11. On My Own
- 12. Where The Wind Goes
- 13. I'm Yours Tonight
- 14. Getting (feat. Speedy & Loyiso)
J23 – 2003
- Track list:
- 1. I Could Love U
- 2. One of a kind
- 3. Beautiful
- 4. Who's That Girl? (feat Johnny Clegg)
- 5. Unstoppable
- 6. I Just Don't Wanna (feat Sid Money)(Written by Danny K, Alexis Faku with Sid Money)
- 7. Murder
- 8. Boogie All Night Long (feat Kabelo & Sid Money)
- 9. Love in the Club
- 10. Soopadoopa
- 11. How Can I Be?
- 12. J23 Interlude
- 13. I Can't Imagine
- 14. Strength of a Woman (Written by Danny with Stuart Roslyn and Drew Milligan)
- 15. Serendipity
- 16. Sunshine
- 17. Back in Your Life
- 18. Stay With Me (Live)
Same Difference (with Mandoza) – 2005
- Track list:
- 1. Mission
- 2. Friday
- 3. Music
- 4. Rollercoaster
- 5. The Last One's
- 6. Ooh Child (Ungabaleki) (feat Stagga)
- 7. 4 Koll
- 8. You Wish
- 9. Mzanzi Party
- 10. Free
- 11. Summertime
- 12. Faki Nchayelo
- 13. How We Roll
- 14. Ooh Child (Ungabaleki) Remix
- 15. Music Remix
This Is My Time – 2006
- Track list:
- 1. This Is My Time (featuring Terri Walker & Kabelo)
- 2. Shorty (featuring WhistleJacket)
- 3. Separate Lies
- 4. Clothes Off (featuring BuckShot)
- 5. Real Man
- 6. Outdacontrol
- 7. Knock Me Off (featuring Pro Kid)
- 8. 1000 Sorrys
- 9. I Like Yo Style (featuring Hip Hop Pantsula)
- 10. Everything About It
- 11. One Night (featuring WhistleJacket)
- 12. Unfrozen
- 13. I Love You (featuring 2xl)
- 14. All About You
- 15. It Doesn't Matter
Across The Line – 2010
- Track list:
- 1. Across The Line
- 2. I Get Up Again
- 3. Made 2 Love You
- 4. Chains
- 5. Wishing Well
- 6. Barricade
- 7. Shades
- 8. Follow Me
- 9. Projecta
- 10. The Borrower
- 11. Lennon
Good Look – 2013
1. Good Look
2. Feels Good to Me
3. I Can't Help It
4. Brown Eyes
5. Dream
6. Personal Paradise (featuring Donald)
7. To Life
8. So Fresh (featuring Da Les)
9. Dance the Night Away
10. Body Type
11. Brown Eyes (J23 Remix) [featuring Kabelo, HHP, Reason & Brickz]
Brown Eyes – 2013 (single)
Feels Good To Me – 2013 (single)
Lit - 2017 (single)
Things We Do – 2018 (single)

=== Movies ===
- Crazy Monkey Presents Straight Outta Benoni 2005
- Bunny Chow 2006
