= Niel Hammann =

Retired South African journalist

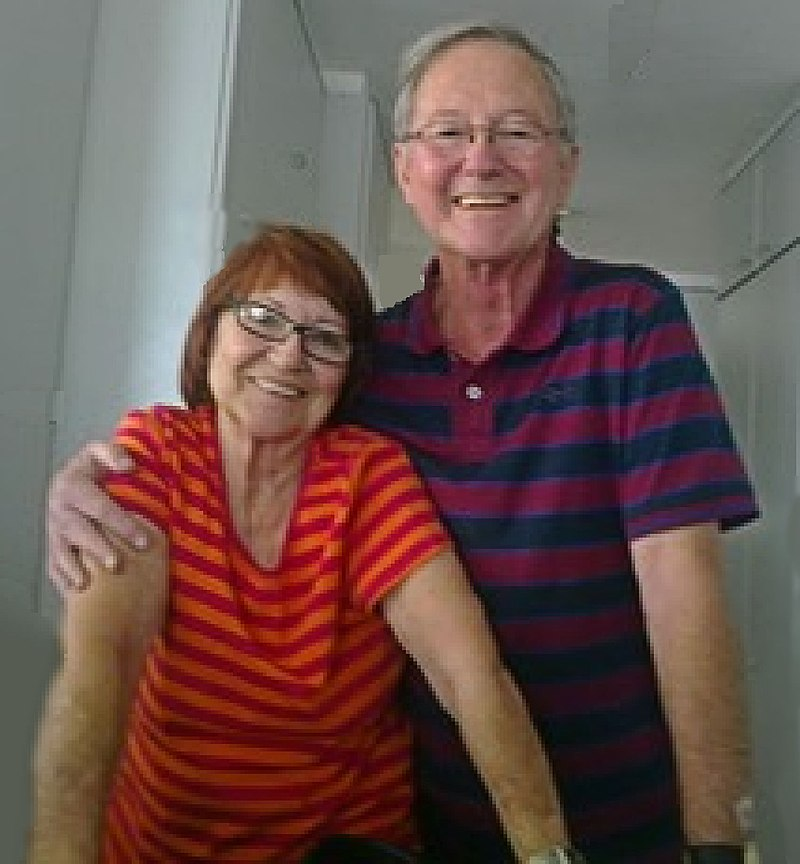
- Niel Hammann with his wife Marlene
- Born: Dirk Daniël Hammann; 6 September 1937 (age 88); King William's Town, Eastern Cape, South Africa
- Occupations: Journalist and editor
- Known for: Senior journalist (Editor-in-Chief) for Naspers magazines Huisgenoot and You in South Africa

Dirk Daniël Hammann, known as Niel Hammann (born 6 September 1937), is a retired South African senior journalist. He was editor-in-chief of the Afrikaans weekly family magazine Huisgenoot, as well as its English sister publication, You.

== Career ==
Hammann was appointed assistant editor of Huisgenoot in September 1977. He became an editor for the magazine in 1978. Huisgenoot and You are published in Cape Town by Media24, an affiliate of Naspers.

By the late 1970s, weekly sales of Huisgenoot dropped to 129,000, leading the publication's owners to consider shutting it down. Hammann revived the popularity of the magazine by turning the what was a conservative family magazine into more of a news magazine with human interest stories, and geared toward television audiences. He also opened syndication offices in London.

The magazine's circulation grew to more than 500,000 in 1984 and reached a record high of 540,000 sales in one week in the 1990s. It was read by more than two million people every week, based on an average issue readership of more than four per copy sold.

In 1987, Hammann launched the magazine You as an English-language version of Huisgenoot. As with Huisgenoot, Hammann had You's content meet international standards, which he had previously studied as London editor for Naspers's magazines.

Hammann retired in the late 1990s.

== Personal life ==
Hammann has a wife, Marlene.

== Awards ==
Naspers awarded him their highest accolade, while the South African Academy for Science and Arts (Afrikaans: Die Suid-Afrikaanse Akademie vir Wetenskap en Kuns) awarded him their medal for excellence in journalism.
