= Ishmael Morabe =

South African musician (born 1971)

- Born: Molefi Ishmael Morabe; November 30, 1971 (age 53); Delareyville, North West, South Africa
- Origin: Johannesburg, South Africa
- Genres: Hip hop; Kwaito; R&B; Afropop; Gospel
- Occupation(s): Singer, songwriter, record producer
- Instruments: Vocals
- Years active: 1990–present
- Labels: Ghetto Ruff, 999 Music, Muthaland Entertainment

Molefi Ishmael Morabe (born 30 November 1971) is a South African hip hop, kwaito and R&B musician. He gained prominence as a member of the influential hip hop group Prophets of Da City and later achieved success as a solo artist. His work has earned him South African Music Awards (SAMA), including wins for Best R&B Album at FNB SAMA in 2006 and 2012 SAMA.

== Early life and career ==
Morabe was born Molefi Ishmael Morabe in Delareyville, North West Province and he grew up in Rustenburg. His early exposure to music came from his mother, who often hosted parties at their home, where music was constantly played. At school, he participated in concerts and was part of a school band. He left Delareyville in Grade 10 to pursue a music career in Johannesburg, staying temporarily with a relative in Hillbrow. Initially, he worked various odd jobs in Hillbrow after he experienced homelessness while honing his musical talents. During this period, he met producer Chicco Twala, who introduced him to Mandla Spikiri and Mdu Masilela, leading to his involvement with the hip hop group Prophets of Da City.

=== Prophets of Da City ===
Morabe's musical journey began with the hip hop group Prophets of Da City, formed in Cape Town. The group was known for its politically charged lyrics and was one of the first South African hip hop acts to gain international recognition. The group's album Age of Truth (1993) was particularly influential, though many of its tracks were banned due to their anti-apartheid political messages.

=== Skeem and Jozi ===
After his time with Prophets of Da City, and feeling his talents were not valued at Ghetto Ruff, he moved to work with Arthur Mafokate at 999 Records, where he had hits like Roba Li Theka.

He later returned to Ghetto Ruff and joined the group Skeem. He then collaborated with Bongani Fassie, Da Les, and Crazy Lu to form the group Jozi in 2007. The group blended hip hop with kwaito and R&B, achieving substantial success in the South African music scene.

== Personal life ==
When his career took off, he developed a cocaine addiction, which he battled for approximately ten years. He spent large amounts of money on drugs weekly and lived a lifestyle marked by excess and drug dependency. Morabe has been open about his struggles with substance abuse and attempted to check himself into rehabilitation in 2011 but relapsed months later. Since then, he has been focused on his music career and personal well-being.

Morabe had a notable relationship with American singer Puff Johnson. They met while she was working in South Africa under the Ghetto Ruff label. Their relationship lasted almost two years but was strained by her return to the United States due to visa issues. Johnson later died from cervical cancer, which deeply affected Morabe.

In recent years, Morabe has made a notable comeback in the music industry. In 2019, he released a track titled Takalani (Ever Since), which sampled the theme song from the children's show Takalani Sesame. The song resonated with many, reflecting on his musical journey from childhood.

In 2023, Morabe collaborated with Amapiano artist Tublaq on a song.
