= General (musician) =

South African musician (c.1975 - 2024)

- Birth name: Simphiwe Sibisi
- Origin: South Africa
- Died: September 29, 2024 (aged 48) Baragwanath Hospital, Johannesburg, South Africa
- Genres: Kwaito
- Years active: Late 1980s – 2024

Simphiwe Sibisi (popularly known as General or General GTZ; 1976 - 29 September 2024) was a South African kwaito musician and a founding member of the influential group Chiskop alongside Mandoza, Sizwe “Lollipop” Motaung and Sibusiso “SB-Bless” Thanjekwayo. He was the last surviving member of the music group.

He died at the Baragwanath Hospital on 29 September 2024. He had undergone major surgery in 2022 as part of his battle with cancer, after which he died at age 48.

Reports indicate that he had been diagnosed with stomach cancer and suffered complications stemming from a problematic surgical procedure in 2022. He also struggled with mounting medical bills during his illness. He suffered cardiac arrest after lunch at the hospital and died on Sunday 29 September 2024.

On 4 October 2024, the South African government issued a media statement offering condolences and acknowledging Sibisi's contributions to South African music and heritage.

His memorial service was held at Pace Community College on Thursday 3 October 2024, where fans, peers and industry figures paid their last respects and celebrated his life and musical achievements. At his funeral in Soweto, Johannesburg on Saturday 5 October 2024, music stars Zola 7 and Spikiri performed. He was buried at the Westpark Cemetery.
