= Afrikaaps =

Afrikaaps could refer to the following:

- Afrikaaps (language), South African language also known as Kaaps.
- Afrikaaps (documentary), 2010 documentary.
