= The Creators (film) =

- Film Poster
- Directed by: Laura Gamse; Jaques De Villiers
- Produced by: Laura Gamse; Nahum Deke
- Starring: Faith47; Cashril+; Ongx Mona; Wara Zintwana; Emile Jansen; Sweat.X; Janine Van Rooy; Mthetho Mapoyi
- Cinematography: Bernard Myburgh
- Edited by: Jacques De Villiers
- Music by: Warongx; Various
- Release date: 22 May 2012 (Cannes Film Festival)
- Running time: 83 minutes
- Country: South Africa
- Languages: English; Xhosa; Afrikaans
- Budget: $25,000

The Creators: South Africa Through the Eyes of Its Artists is a 2012 South African documentary film produced and directed by Laura Gamse which interweaves the lives of diverse South African artists including Faith47, Cashril+, Warongx, Emile Jansen of Black Noise, Markus Wormstorm and Spoek Mathambo of Sweat.X, Blaq Pearl, and Mthetho Mapoyi.

== Synopsis ==
The film follows Cashril Plus, a twelve-year-old animator and the son of graffiti artist Faith47, through whose perspective it shows his mother painting murals in townships around Cape Town. It also follows musicians Warongx (afro-blues), Emile Jansen (hip hop), Sweat.X (glam rap), Blaq Pearl (spoken word), and Mthetho (opera), tracing how their lives intersect. Born in different areas of a formerly segregated South Africa, the artists address the history and legacy of apartheid through their respective art forms. The film examines each artist's social background, personal characteristics, and creative practice, as well as the connections between their separate lives.

== Cast ==
=== Artists ===
==== Faith47 ====
A street artist illuminating the forgotten townships haloing South Africa's cities, Faith is a subversive activist creating for public art and a mother painting a new world for her twelve-year-old son. Faith uses the 1955 ANC document, "The Freedom Charter," to inspire murals questioning whether South Africa's post-apartheid government kept its central goals after ascending to power. Painting in townships with levels of violence surpassing all of sub-Saharan Africa, Faith infiltrates the culture on a level that allows her to merge seamlessly with the country's impoverished majority. The film views Faith through the eyes of her son, aka Cashril Plus: South Africa's youngest genius.

==== Warongx ====
An Afro-blues artist originally from the rural Eastern Cape, Ongx was awarded first place in a national music competition in 2007, winning a record deal with Africa's largest music production company. When the deal did not turn out as promised, Ongx must play music on the streets, wash dishes and connect illegal electricity in the townships in order to make ends meet. Fighting tooth and nail to sustain himself through his passion, Ongx puts a human face on a devastating social reality in a country with roughly 40% unemployed citizens. Ongx and his best friend Wara form the band Warongx, singing in their traditional language of Xhosa while the world around them turns increasingly towards English pop music. Demonstrating pride in traditional African culture, Ongx and Wara expose the schism between their people's roots and an increasingly westernized media landscape.

==== Mthetho Mapoyi ====
Before leaving his family, Mthetho's father left behind one opera CD, which Mthetho listened to repeatedly while growing up. Soon, Mthetho discovered that he could sing Pavarotti's arias by memory. Mthetho used his natural talent to teach his friends and support his family until his mother's death from HIV/AIDS. From the age of 9 years old, Mthetho sang along with his other friends Athenkosi Jaza, Thulani Myeki, Mzwamadoda Nkanunu and Elvis Seekoei. Later, he then fell into a pattern of crime, enduring multiple stabbings and a burning in gang wars and chance incidents. With a knife scar stretching the length of his cheek, Mthetho is now pulling himself out of gang life, using opera to uplift his mind and support his family. A Dutch pianist Derk Blaisse found Mthetho and his friends on the street and helped Mthetho apply for training opportunities. Derk Blaisse, Mthetho Mapoyi and Athenkosi performed together at markets and Blaisse's restaurant The Crypt. Mthetho was featured on the BBC 7 January 2013 (the BBC spelled his name 'Mthetho Maphoyi') and gave a TedxTeen talk in early 2012 (TedxTeen spelled his name 'Mteto Maphoyi').

==== Emile Jansen ====
As an MC, B-boy and breakdancer from the seminal hip hop group Black Noise, Emile united a generation of youth during the fall of apartheid in the tumultuous eighties and nineties. Emile participated in anti-apartheid protests and school boycotts during his youth, getting shot at by police and witnessing the death of friends fighting to overthrow South Africa's oppressive government. Emile now practices more subversive activism in his community, creating a conscious culture through breakdancing workshops, events and b-boy competitions.

==== Blaq Pearl ====
The younger sister of Mr. Devious, a hip hop activist killed amidst gang warfare in their hometown of Mitchell's Plain, Blaq Pearl's life is imbued with the struggle between a violent environment and a peaceful core. As a spoken word artist and performer, Blaq Pearl worked in a prison teaching creative writing to inmates where her brother taught before his untimely death. The same prison released her brother's murderer just months after his incarceration. The killer now lives in the neighborhood next to Blaq Pearl's family home. In the ten years prior to 2007, four times as many people were murdered in South Africa than Americans killed during the entire Vietnam War. In a country where violence threatens physically and psychologically, Blaq Pearl's poetry meditates her situation at a level free from the chaos of the streets.

==== Sweat.X ====
"Spoek Mathambo is a slippery post-apartheid glam-rap prince from Soweto who is descended from distant African royalty, or Jewish, or both" (Fader Magazine). Spoek is one half of Sweat.X, a radical black/white duo from Soweto and Pretoria — arguably polar opposite locations in the world's most polarized economy. Sweat.x exemplifies the growing population of South Africa that is tired of stale, on-the-sleeve activism. Their music leaves the didactic lectures in the past, forging the current, or maybe futuristic, South Africa. Using their music to explore the disconnect with impoverished communities in South Africa's Karoo, Sweat.X takes reunification into their own hands, leaving overt political protest in the past in favor of a new way for a new age.

== Reception ==
The Creators won "Best Documentary" at the National Geographic All Roads Film Festival, "Best Documentary - Music" at the World Music and Independent Film Festival, the Rosebud Award at the Rosebud Film Festival and a Special Jury Mention at the Montreal International Black Film Festival.

The documentary was featured on NPR's Tell Me More and reviewed in the academic journal, African Conflict and Peacebuilding Review. During its fine cut film festival release the documentary was reviewed in "Ceasefire Magazine" by Hana Riaz', Mambo Magazine by Jaki Sainsbury, and in The Huffington Post by Tamar Abrams. Interviews with Director Laura Gamse have been published in Sweden's FlattrChattr, (published by Flattr), Los Angeles' The Student Life and New South Wales' Soul Strategies.

Sainsbury wrote in July 2011, "The Creators proved true art is not restrained by politics or religion — or even life. Expression in this sphere is unrestrained. The film proves that anyone's vision must be developed into its full artistic potential. If there is a message to be told by modern South Africa, it's that art will save your sanity." - Mambo Magazine

Abrams wrote in March 2011, "Given the unrest in the Middle East that fills our television screens each night, The Creators is a worthy companion piece. It shows people who refuse to toe the line, whose music will not be silenced, who use their art to combat brutality and injustice." -The Huffington Post

Executive Producer of Law & Order Ian Biederman wrote that the documentary is "a beautiful and important contribution...to the literature of creativity and its endless capacity to fuel transcendence".

The Creators had its premiere in Europe at the Thessaloniki Documentary Festival, and screened at film festivals in Africa and North and South America, including the Zanzibar International Film Festival, the Fulbright Academy Film Festival, the Hot Docs Doc Shop, the National Arts Festival, the Texas Black Film Festival, the Encounters International Documentary Festival, the LA Film and Music Weekend, the SF DocFest, the New York Margaret Mead Film Festival, and the Bahamas International Film Festival.
