= Shaheen Ariefdien =

South African rapper

- Also known as: Ariefdien, S. Ariefdien, Shaheen
- Born: Cape Town, South Africa
- Genres: Rap, African hip hop
- Occupation: Rapper
- Years active: 1990–present
- Labels: Ghetto Ruff, Tusk Music, Nation Records, Ku Shu Shu Records
- Member of: Prophets of Da City
- Website: www.myspace.com/cape_crusader

Shaheen Ariefdien is a South African rapper and anthropologist.

== Early life ==
Born in Cape Town, son of jazz musician Issy Ariefdien, he grew up in Elsie's cape on the Cape Flats, but spent most of his earlier years travelling various parts of South Africa with his father.

== Career ==
The Sugarhill Gang's "Rappers Delight" had a big influence on him, and Ariefdien ranks today as one of the most talented rappers or MCs in South Africa. He gained recognition at The BASE (legendary club which featured Saturday afternoon hip-hop jams), with his supremacy in freestyle battles. He is credited with having set the standards with rap styles, skills, and lyrical content in Cape Town.

As an MC, he is almost unsurpassed in South Africa, while his production skills are dominant on all of POC's releases to date. He has also made his mark on hip-hop history in South Africa, as he was one of the key members who were responsible for setting up the African Hip Hop Movement, and still concentrates on development in the hip-hop community.

He has always been politically and socially conscious, which stems from his school days when he was a member of the Student's Representative Council and was actively involved in protests at school. He brought an air of political awareness and criticism to his lyrics, and has been understandably harsh on the old Apartheid government.

== Personal life ==
Former member of the pioneering South African hip-hop group Prophets of Da City, he is now involved in a number of youth educational projects using hip-hop as a tool for social justice and has facilitated several youth programs in South Africa and abroad.

He is B.A. in University of Cape Town and M.A. in social anthropology at York University in Toronto, Ontario, Canada, with his research area focusing on hip-hop and education. He worked for the Humber College.

== Discography ==
=== With Prophets of Da City ===
- Our World (1990)
- Boomstyle (1991)
- Age of Truth (1993)
- Phunk Phlow (1994)
- Universal Souljaz (1995)
- Ghetto Code (1997)
