= Mapaputsi =

South African musician (1976–2024)

- Born: Sandile Ebby Ngwenya; 12 February 1976; Zola, South Africa
- Died: 5 September 2024 (aged 48) Durban, Kwa-Zulu Natal, South Africa
- Genre: Kwaito
- Occupations: Singer; Songwriter
- Instrument: Vocals
- Years active: 1997–2024
- Labels: Ghetto Ruff; CCP Records; Izinja Productions

Sandile Ebby Ngwenya (known professionally as Mapaputsi; 12 February 1976 – 5 September 2024) was a South African kwaito artist. He gained national prominence with his hit single 2001 debut "Izinja", which earned him Best Kwaito Artist and Best Kwaito Song at the 2002 Metro FM Awards, along with Best Music Video at the 2003 South African Music Awards. "Izinja" sold 150,000 copies triple platinum and Mapaputsi continued his success on the radio charts with numerous hit singles, including "My Love", "Kleva", "Manga Manga Business", "Woza Friday" and "Grova Mo".

== Life and career ==
=== Early life and career beginnings ===
Mapaputsi was born Sandile Ebby Ngwenya on February 12, 1976. In an interview on the Podcast and Chill with MacG in April 2022, Mapaputsi revealed that he was born at the headquarters of the Zion Christian Church (ZCC) in Moria, Limpopo after his paralyzed mother visited there for spiritual help while pregnant. and he was raised in the township of Zola, Soweto.

Ngwenya began to pursue a career in music by started off in gospel music with backup-singing gigs for artists like Rebecca Malope Vuyo Mokoena & Pure Magic before shifting to kwaito in the late 1990s. He credited Vuyo Mokoena and the late DJ Khabzela as the people who believed in him after familiarizing himself with the inner workings of gospel music, he started working on craving path in Kwaito working with the likes TKZee & Chiskop as He was nicknamed 'Mapaputsi' by an Italian shoe salesman in Zola and was encouraged by Tokollo 'Magesh' Tshabalala to use the nickname as his stage name.

=== 1997–2002: Velu`Vaye and Izinja ===
South African Sports, Arts and Culture Minister, Gayton McKenzie lauded Mapaputsi and said he “put kwaito on the map” through his fusion of pantsula, pop and hip-hop elements. His sudden passing from a short illness on 5 September 2024 at age 48 prompted an outpouring of grief from fellow musicians, cultural leaders, and media, who remembered him as a pioneering creative force and a voice for post-apartheid township youth.

== Discography ==
=== Studio albums ===
- Velu`Vaye (1997)
- Izinja (2002)
- Kleva (2003)
- Last Man Standing' (2004)
- Groova Mo' (2005)
- Still Barking' (2009)
