= Huisgenoot =

South African magazine

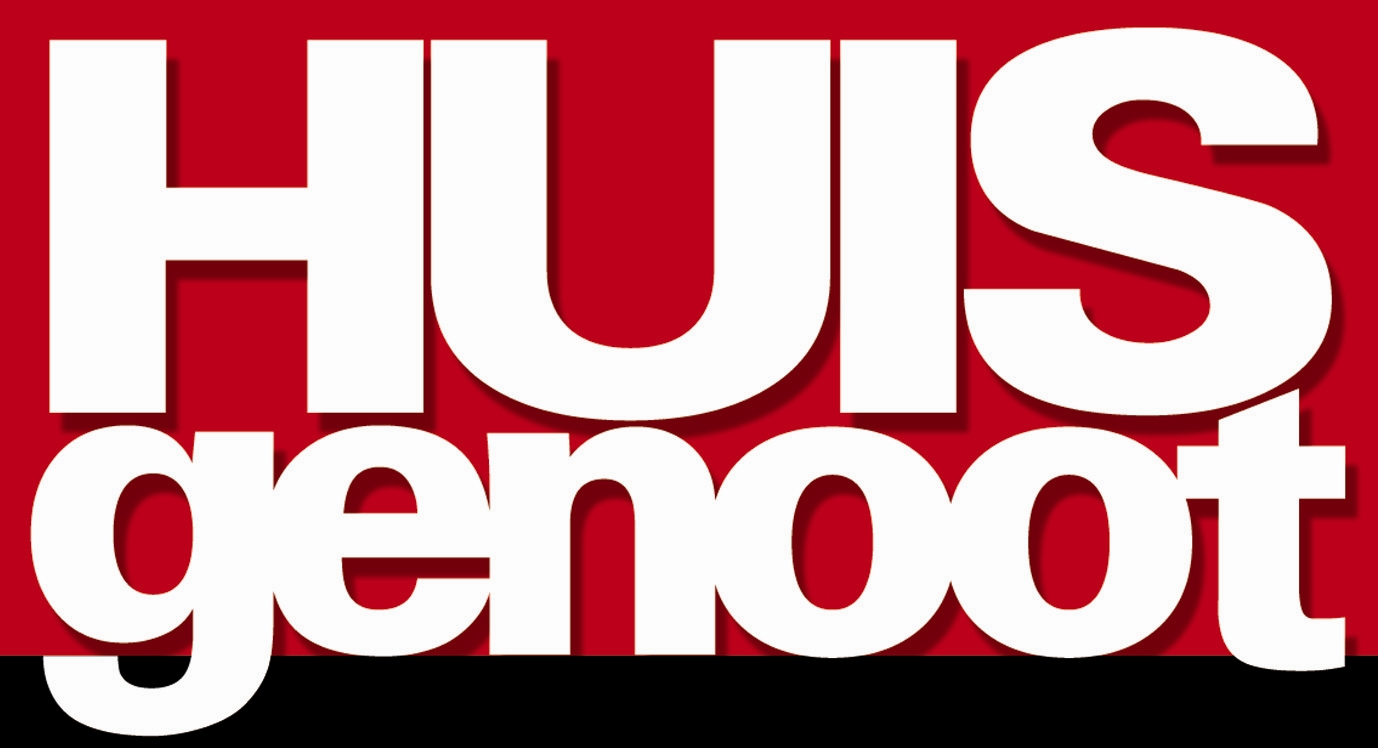
- Editor: Yvonne Beyers
- Categories: Celebrity; human interest; news
- Frequency: Weekly
- First issue: May 1916
- Company: Media24 (Naspers)
- Country: South Africa
- Language: Afrikaans
- Website: huisgenoot.com

Huisgenoot (Afrikaans for Housemate) is a weekly South African Afrikaans-language general-interest family magazine. It has the highest circulation figures of any South African magazine and is followed by sister magazine YOU, its English-language version. A third magazine, Drum, is directed at the black market. The magazines have a combined circulation of about 550 000 copies a week. Yvonne Beyers is the current editor of Huisgenoot.

It is estimated that more than two million people read Huisgenoot weekly. The magazine also has many brand extensions and a popular concert, Skouspel, was held at Sun City every year until 2014. Some of the best Afrikaans artists are heard and the most popular singers, actors and TV shows of the year are honoured with an award called Tempo. A yearly Skouspel concert is also held in Cape Town. Huisgenoot launched a few successful line extensions in 2010, including recipe and blockbuster titles.

In July 2012, the magazine also launched its first reality television show, in conjunction with the Afrikaans television channel kykNET. The show, titled Saktyd (Deadline), gave viewers insight into what it takes to produce South Africa's biggest magazine on a weekly basis, while challenging 13 new journalists to win the job of a lifetime at the magazine.

The magazine is published by Media24, a subsidiary company of Naspers publishing group. Content includes a mix of real-life drama, glamour, fashion and consumer affairs articles as well as recipes, crossword puzzles, home projects and sport. It has a children's and a teen section and at least one short story a week or a serial...

== History ==
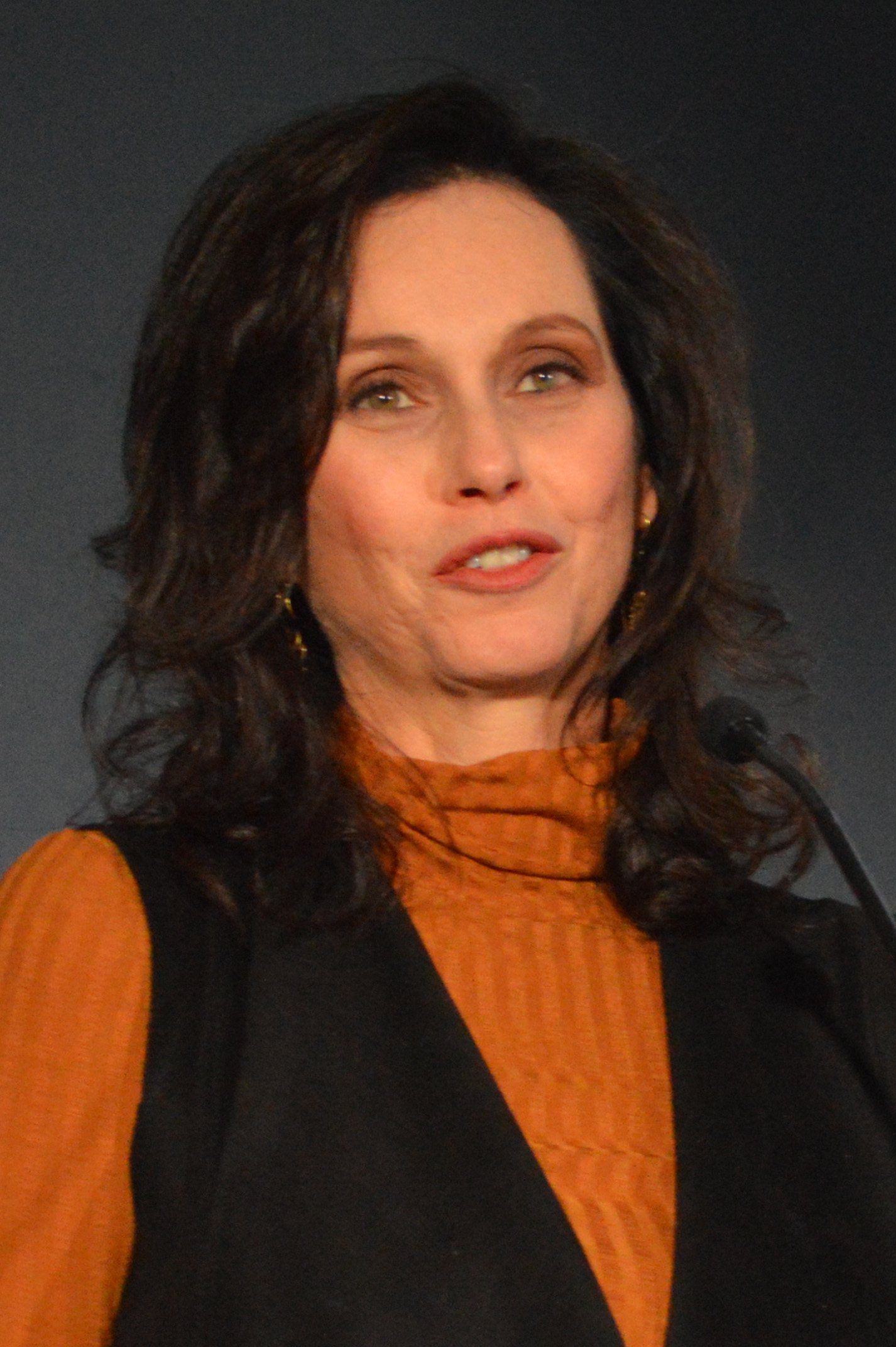
Editor Henriëtte Loubser addresses the crowd during Huisgenoot's 100th birthday party, 20 May 2016.

The magazine was founded as the monthly De Huisgenoot, written in Dutch, in 1916. The first magazine cost 6d (six pennies or five cents) and consisted of 26 pages. President Paul Kruger was on the cover and the main article was a life sketch on the president. The first advertisement for that issue was by Stuttafords.

There were two reasons behind its founding:

- to financially support the newspaper De Burger (The Citizen), which was the political mouthpiece of the Cape National Party; and
- provide the Afrikaner population with inspiration, information and entertainment in Afrikaans (or, originally, Dutch).

While the cause of Afrikaner nationalism dominated the content of the magazine for decades, the editors of the magazine gradually had to make concessions to popular taste. Covers featuring Afrikaner heroes and politicians were replaced by ones featuring female film stars in the 1950s and 1960s. The Dutch-sounding title De Huisgenoot was changed to the more Afrikaans-sounding Die Huisgenoot and in 1977 the name was further simplified to simply Huisgenoot.

By the late 1970s the culture and mores of the Afrikaner population had begun to diverge from earlier generations, leading to a drastic decline in the magazine's readership and finances. By 1978 the magazine was in serious trouble and a new editor, Niel Hammann, was appointed. He took Huisgenoot in a more populist and profit-driven direction and the popularity and sales of the magazine subsequently surged – from 140,000 to 500,000 magazines per week.

The popularity of Huisgenoot has continued almost unabated since then, making the magazine and its English sister publication YOU the two most successful magazines in South Africa.

=== Milestones ===
This entire section sourced from

- In the first issues, page numbers overflowed from one issue to the next and only started with one again in May 1917.
- The words of a proposed new Afrikaans national anthem appeared in the issue of March 1919 – the magazine mentioned that it was not clear who wrote the song, "Uit die Blou van Onse Hemel", and requested the author to contact the magazine. Today it is known that the author was Cornelis Jacobus Langenhoven.
- The first female on the cover was H.S.J Joubert, who died on 8 September 1916.
- The women's pages in the magazine were also heavily criticised. Readers described women being dressed in modern outfits as looking like devils – "nes duiwels gelijk". The editor had an easy solution: “Neither of us has seen a devil before, and we request that readers who has had this experience before please give us their input.”
- In April 1918 the magazine announces that Afrikaans is now one of the country’s official languages.
- The first poster is published in February 1922, a black and white copy of an oil painting by Jacobus Hendrik Pierneef.
- Huisgenoot became a weekly magazine in November 1923, until then it was a monthly.
- On 11 December 1923 the magazine boasted a print run of 30 000. Today Huisgenoot sells more than 200 000 copies weekly.
- Colour was used for the first time in the issue of 2 January 1931 – black, blue and red.
- In the magazine of 2 September 1927 the editor wrote that it is not a political magazine.
- In the issue of 29 May 1936, television was mentioned for the first time. This was still 40 years before the SABC launched television in South Africa.
- In the late thirties T.O. Honiball started producing illustrations on a regular basis for the magazine.
- In July 1948, a new competition was announced – readers were invited to write in to tell how they felt about marrying English-speaking South Africans.
- Adoons, the popular comic about baboons by T.O. Honiball, appeared for the first time in the issue of 2 July 1948.
- Four full-colour pages appeared for the first time in the issue of 27 November 1953.
- Social issues about ladies entertaining men in their rooms on a regular basis were included in the issue of 14 May 1954. A series of articles about failing marriages followed this article.
- In 1957, a competition was launched to find South Africa's youngest grandmother. The winner was Mrs G.P. Kruger of Prieska. She became a grandmother at the age of 31 years and 7 months.
- A Calorie chart appeared for the first time on 17 January 1958 with an eating plan a week later. The heading of the first article was: “Vir Poppiedik en Potjierol – ‘n kaloriekaart na die oordaad van die vakansiedae”.
- In the issue of 18 September 1959 a competition was launched where a Borgward motor car worth £919 was the first prize and the second prize was a radio worth £90.
- In 1966 an article on Betsie Verwoerd, wife of the then Prime Minister Hendrik Verwoerd, who did a master's degree on the history of Huisgenoot, appeared. It was hand-written and consisted of 53 000 words.
- The major competition in the sixties was the word building competition, the first prize was a car, second prize, an organ and third prize, a fridge.
- The first Miss Teen competition was launched in the issue of 5 May 1972. Heart transplant pioneer, Christiaan Barnard, crowned the winner. The competition became a regular feature in Huisgenoot.
- In the issue of 27 August 1987 an English sister-title, named YOU, was announced.

== Digital platforms ==
Huisgenoot has increased its use of digital platforms including an iPad edition, e-magazine on Magzter, a website, mobi site, iPhone application, Facebook page (with more than 275 000 fans), Twitter page, YouTube channel and Mxit.

=== Interactive content ===
In 2010, Huisgenoot and sister-magazines YOU and DRUM, started using new technology developments. An interactive tool, utilising Microsoft Tag technology, enables readers to watch videos or download wallpaper simply by scanning a picture of a barcode-like tag printed in the magazine. There are various tags at the bottom of pages throughout the magazine.
