= Saktyd =

South African reality television show

Saktyd's official logo.

Saktyd (the Afrikaans word for 'deadline') is a South African reality television show, which aired on the Afrikaans television channel kykNET (channel 111 and 144) on DStv between 17 July 2012 and 9 October 2012. In Afrikaans, the word ʽsaktydʼ refers to the time that a magazine or newspaper is sent to a printer to be printed.

The show was set in the offices of South Africa's biggest, oldest and most well-known family and general interest magazine, Huisgenoot (the Afrikaans word for 'house companion'), whose editorial team gave 13 delegates the chance to win the job of a lifetime as a journalist at the magazine. The show aired on Tuesdays at 19:30, and was repeated five times during the week: Wednesdays at 10:30, Fridays at 00:00 and 22:00, Saturdays at 15:30 and Sundays at 09:00.

In the show's finale on 9 October 2012, the 26-year-old proofreader and copywriter Christiaan Boonzaier from Cape Town was declared the winner in front of an audience of 6000 people.

== Rationale ==
According to kykNET's marketing manager, Haddad Viljoen, the concept for the show was formulated by Huisgenoot, kykNET and the show's production company, Homebrew Films; Viljoen added that the show is a first for South Africa. However, in an article about the show, Haidee Muller – Huisgenoot reporter and Saktyd judge – was of the opinion that the show is the brain-child of Esmaré Weideman, CEO of Media24 and previous editor-in-chief of Huisgenoot, YOU and Drum magazines. In turn, Weideman commented that the idea for Saktyd was born from readers and fans of the magazine, who wanted a behind-the-scenes look of what it takes to write a story for Huisgenoot. At the same time, the Huisgenoot editorial team, according to Saktyd's head judge, Izelle Venter (currently Huisgenoot, YOU and Drum's editor-in-chief) is also continually looking for the best talent to work for the magazine. Therefore, the show gave viewers a peek into the pressure-filled world of weekly magazine journalism, while concurrently searching for the next wave of talent in South African magazine journalism.

== Format ==
Saktyd's format was no different than other reality TV shows: In every episode of the 13-episode first season, challenges tested basic skills needed by a successful journalist in the world of magazine journalism. Although it was initially reported that the judges would send the contestants packing one by one, two revelations were revealed in Episode 3 (which aired on 31 July 2012):

1. the losing team in each challenge was sent to "Die Hok" (Afrikaans word for 'The Chamber'), where they got the chance to explain why they should stay in the show, and
2. the contestants got an opportunity in The Chamber to vote their fellow contestants out of the show.

== Judges ==
- Izelle Venter – Editor-in-chief (Huisgenoot, YOU and Drum)
- Wicus Pretorius – Deputy Editor (Huisgenoot)
- Haidee Muller – Reporter (Huisgenoot)

== Prizes ==
The winner of Saktyd won a one-year contract to work as a journalist at Huisgenoot.

== Contestants ==
[In alphabetical order, according to name]

Name	Age♠	Resident	Profession
Astrid Lippert-Fisher	32	Muizenberg	Coordinator at In Country
Christiaan Boonzaier ("Rooibaard"♣)	26	Cape Town	Proofreader / Copywriter
Christian Lee	23	Johannesburg	Producer, coordinator, stylist, master of ceremonies, artist
Elridus Grobler	26	Bellville	Photographer
Jeannie Erasmus	22	Potchefstroom	Student
Jolene Fransman	31	Cape Town	Researcher
Jurie Prins	32	Franschhoek	Owner of a production company and part-time radio broadcaster
Laura Stopforth	23	Stellenbosch	Works for an NGO
Leilani Snyman	37	Witwatersrand	Owner of a marketing company
Leon Flemmer	35	Middelburg	Correctional Services
Leveinia Botha	42	George	Consultant in Human Resources at the George Municipality
Lilian Strauss	23	Cape Town	Student
Tercia Jacobs	27	Gordon's Bay	Au pair

- ♠ At the time of recording.
- ♣ Afrikaans word for 'Red Beard' — a nickname given to Christiaan Boonzaier by judge Wicus Pretorius in Episode 2, to differentiate him from Christian Lee, another contestant with the same name (although different in spelling).

== Elimination Table ==
The elimination table gives a summary of the contestants that were safe (indicated by a green block) and were eliminated (red block) in each episode. Contestants who were sent to The Chamber and were up for elimination, are indicated with a yellow block. The finalists are indicated by a maroon block, while the winner is indicated in blue.

The contestant that is eliminated appears at the bottom of the table in the week he/she left the show, while the contestants still in the game are collated alphabetically, according to name.

Contestant	Week 1♦	Week 2	Week 3	Week 4	Week 5	Week 6	Week 7♦	Week 8	Week 9♥	Week 10	Week 11	Week 12	Week 13
Christiaan Boonzaier													
Astrid Lippert-Fisher													
Jeannie Erasmus													
Jurie Prins													
Jolene Fransman													
Christian Lee													
Laura Stopforth													
Leilani Snyman													
Tercia Jacobs													
Elridus Grobler													
Lilian Strauss													
Leon Flemmer													
Leveinia Botha													

Winner
Finalist
Safe
Unsafe
Eliminated

- ♦ No contestant was eliminated in this episode.
- ♥ Two contestants were eliminated in this episode.

== Episode summaries ==
=== Episode 1 ===
In the first episode (that aired on 17 July 2012), Saktyd's three judges are introduced – Izelle Venter, Wicus Pretorius en Haidee Muller. Viewers get to know them a bit, and all three name the qualities they are looking for in the perfect candidate. Izelle takes viewers on a tour of the Huisgenoot office, which occupies two full floors in the Naspers building in Cape Town. Key members out of the 150-member editorial team also introduce themselves to viewers, and explain what their roles at the magazine are.

Then, the programme focuses on the audition phase of the competition. Although over 1000 entries were received, only a top-100 were invited to auditions. Some auditionees sing, while one contestant tries to bribe the judges with sweets; some contestants fail to identify Gill Marcus, Maria Ramos, Zahara and Angie Motshekga, while most struggle to spell the words 'onmiddellik' (Afrikaans word for 'immediately') and 'Franschhoek' in front of the judges.

Finally, only 13 delegates are selected to take part in the programme. The top-13 introduce themselves to the judges and the viewers. Izelle then announces that viewers will get to know the contestants more in-depth in the next episode.

• Eliminated: No contestant was eliminated in the first episode.

=== Episode 2 ===
The second episode (that aired on 24 July 2012) opens with in-depth profiles of the 13 finalists; the diverse group is introduced at their homes, on a golf course, in the gym and at the beach (to name a few settings).

Thereafter, Izelle (head judge) announces that a cocktail party will be held in honour of the 13 finalists. The party, which was held on the roof of the Naspers building, is star-studded with South African celebrities and influential people in the media. After a short introduction, the contestants get the chance to mingle with the guests. What the contestants do not know, however, is that they are already busy with a challenge — one that will send the weakest contestant home. It is only after the party that Izelle shares with the contestants that they would have to write a 350-word article in 30 minutes by hand, using information they should have garnered as journalists from celebrity guests at the party. Izelle adds that the weakest contestant will leave the competition immediately.

After 30 minutes, the articles are handed to the judges, who heavily criticise the contestants: Izelle notes that many of the finalists did not listen to the expectation of the assignment, while other contestants wrote about themselves when they were supposed to write about the celebrity guests. Wicus (judge) said that the articles make him nauseous.

In front of the contestants, Jeannie is singled out for an outstanding article, while Christiaan [Red Beard], Leilani and Jurie are described as disappointing. Eventually, Leveinia is eliminated from the competition, after Izelle comments that there wasn't one single sentence in her article that could be published.

• Eliminated: Leveinia Botha.

=== Episode 3 ===
In the third episode (that aired on 31 July 2012), the contestants were split into two teams: Lilian was appointed the captain of the Commas (Astrid, Christiaan [Red Beard], Christian, Jeannie and Tercia), while Elridus was appointed the leader of the Full Stops (Jolene, Jurie, Laura, Leilani and Leon).

The top-12 were challenged to post 3 different posts on Huisgenoot's Facebook page: a post with only text, a post with text and a picture, and a post with text and a video. The team who could generate the most "likes" would win the challenge. Each team could use the expertise of one South African celebrity comedian and singer: the Commas were assisted by Wicus van der Merwe, while the Full Stops were guided along the way by Emo Adams. During the challenge, two members of each team (Christian and Lilian on behalf of the Commas; Leilani and Leon on behalf of the Full Stops) visited the offices of Cape Town-based radio station 94.5 Kfm, where they vied for listeners' votes on Elana Afrika's afternoon show.

At the end of the challenge, Izelle (head judge) lauded the Full Stops' creativity, which eventually garnered them just under 5000 "likes" – a new record for a single post on Huisgenoot's Facebook page. Although the Commas only generated just over 3500 "likes", and the win would then go to the Full Stops, both Izelle and Wicus (judge) questioned the winners' integrity. On one post, the Full Stops promised readers that they would shave Emo Adams's hair, if they could get 3000 likes; by the end of the challenge, Huisgenoot's Facebook fans surprised the team with just under 5000 "likes". Not having Emo's permission to shave his hair, the team promised Huisgenoot's readers something they could not deliver. According to Izelle, she would give a Huisgenoot employee who made the same mistake a written warning. Because of the damage the Full Stops inflicted on the Huisgenoot brand (with many Facebook fans posting that they would "unlike" Huisgenoot's Facebook page), Izelle sent the actual winners to The Chamber.

Introduced for the first time, The Chamber is a small room, where contestants get to motivate why they should stay in the show. In another twist, Izelle also announced that the contestants themselves would get the opportunity to eliminate one of their team members. The votes were split as follows:

Contestant	Voted For
Elridus	Jolene
Jolene	Elridus
Jurie	Leon
Laura	Leon
Leilani	Leon
Leon	Elridus

On account of Leon's mistake at 94.5 Kfm (where he accidentally confused Emo Adams with Riaan Cruywagen) and his performance in the challenge in general, he was voted out of the competition.

• Eliminated: Leon Flemmer

=== Episode 4 ===
In the fourth episode (that aired on 7 August 2012), both the Commas (Astrid, Christiaan [Red Beard], Christian, Jeannie, Lilian and Tercia) and the Full Stops (Elridus, Jolene, Jurie, Laura and Leilani) met the judges at Paarl Media in Cape Town — the largest printing company in Africa and one of the largest in the Southern Hemisphere, where close to 400 000 Huisgenoot magazines are printed weekly. The teams were each given 300 Huisgenoot and Die Burger combo packs, and were tasked to sell them at traffic interchanges in Durbanville for R20.

At the onset, the Full Stops worked strategically by selling their magazines in bulk: Jolene sold 100 to the University of Stellenbosch Business School, while Elridus (comically) sold 50 to his mother. All the Commas, except Jeannie, concentrated on selling their magazines to drivers at traffic lights; Jeannie, in turn, spent most of the hour organising the combo packs and finances.

At the end of the challenge, the Full Stops sold all 300 of their combo packs, while the Commas could only sell 110. But in a twist, Wicus (judge) and Haidee (judge) announced that each team would receive an additional 500 Huisgenoot magazines, and were tasked to sell them at one of three malls: Cape Gate in Brackenfell, Eden on the Bay in Bloubergstrand and the Liberty Promenade in Mitchells Plain. As the frontrunners, the Full Stops chose Cape Gate first, while the Commas settled on Eden on the Bay.

Again the Full Stops focussed on bulk sales: Leilani sold 300 of the 500 Huisgenoot magazines to the centre's management, while her other team members sold magazines to shops in the mall. The Commas, on the other hand, struggled to sell magazines, as they realised most of the shoppers in the mall are largely English, and did not want to buy an Afrikaans magazine.

Back at the Naspers building, Izelle (head judge) revealed that out of 800 magazines, the Full Stops sold 713 — a feat, Izelle admits, the judges themselves would probably not be able to achieve; the Commas, however, only sold 142. The Commas clearly lost the challenge, and were immediately sent to The Chamber. In The Chamber, both Christiaan [Red Beard] and Astrid acknowledged that the team worked well together, but that their choice to go to a largely English mall was a mistake. Jeannie also stated that Lilian did a good job as a leader, but that she should be sent home because her leadership abilities were not strong enough. The contestants were not given the chance to vote each other out, and Izelle shocked the team by ousting Lilian from the show. Post-elimination, Christiaan [Red Beard] said that Lilian was a great leader because she listened to her team; he also said that Lilian took the punch for a team decision (to go to an English mall). Lilian, in turn, emotionally said in a post-elimination interview that Jeannie had no respect for her authority, and that she (Jeannie) insisted on going to an English mall with rich consumers, rather than an Afrikaans mall with consumers that don't have money. Jeannie also stated that she loves her teammates, but that she's concentrating on herself in the competition; she also stated that she's glad to have another shot at proving herself to the judges.

• Eliminated: Lilian Strauss

=== Episode 5 ===
In the fifth episode (that aired on 14 August 2012), the 10 remaining contestants were grouped into new teams: the new Comma group consisted of Christian, Jeannie, Jolene, Laura and Tercia, while the Full Stops consisted of Astrid, Christiaan [Red Beard], Elridus, Jurie and Leilani.

The theme for the challenge dealt with environmentally friendly, "green", sustainable living. Each team had to develop an information graphic with the help of a Huisgenoot illustrator and layout artist, and combine text with graphics to educate readers on the topic. Izelle (head judge) made it clear that each information graphic had to be 3-D, and that information on the final product had to be factually correct. To gather information for their information graphic, the Commas visited a house that was partially eco-friendly. They were assisted by Dave Pepler — a South African television host and expert on all things "green" — who gave them tips on how to make the house even more "green". The Full Stops visited a house that was built with eco-friendly materials, and were tasked to report on eco-friendly house construction; they were assisted by architect Carl Morkel.

After the outings, both teams started to compile their information graphics. Due to time constraints and the pressure of the challenge, tempers flared: Christian criticised Tercia's poor contribution to the task, who in turn admitted that due to her background as a house cleaner and au pair, she had never had the opportunity to do a Google search; she also admitted that she thought a "green" house is a house that is painted green. At the Full Stops, Elridus was irritating all his team members.

At judging, Izelle (head judge) lauded the Full Stops' information graphic, but criticised their dull copy. On the contrary, the Commas were criticised for not including a 3-D graphic in their final product; Izelle also accused the team of copyright infringement, after they forgot to reference their sources. However, the copy they did deliver was of an outstanding quality, and she decided to handed the Commas the win. Therefore, the Full Stops were sent to The Chamber.

In The Chamber, the Full Stops were asked to vote out one of their teammates. The votes were cast as follows:

Contestant	Voted For
Astrid	Elridus
Christiaan (Red Beard)	Elridus
Elridus	Astrid
Jurie	Elridus
Leilani	Elridus

According to Leilani, Elridus only gives 50% in each challenge, while both Christiaan (Red Beard) and Astrid said that Elridus is really hard to work with. In turn, Elridus admitted that he struggles working in a team. With 4 votes against him, he was sent home.

• Eliminated: Elridus Grobler

=== Episode 6 ===
In episode six (that aired on 21 August 2012), the Commas (Christian, Jeannie, Jolene, Laura and Tercia) and Full Stops (Astrid, Christiaan [Red Beard], Jurie and Leilani) were tasked with giving two special guests and Huisgenoot readers — Leza van Heerden and Riana Gebhardt — makeovers; Riana was paired with the Commas, while Leza was paired with the Full Stops. Fashion was the theme of the week, with each team being responsible for their guest's hair, makeup and clothing. In addition, both teams had to do interviews with their guests to find out what in their personal lives they would want to enrich. Once identified, both teams had to find sponsors to make those dreams come true. In the end, a double-page spread documenting the whole transformation had to be compiled.

First, Christian, Jeannie and Tercia from the Comma team, and Astrid and Jurie from the Full Stops went to Woolworths to find clothes for the guests. Although the Full Stops sailed through the task smoothly, things were rocky at the Comma team: Tercia continually irritated Christian by choosing the wrong clothing size for Riana 5 times in a row. According to Jeannie, Tercia could not focus on a simple task — especially when she could not grasp why a size-22 woman cannot fit into a size-10 dress.

Next, Jolene and Laura from the Comma team, and Christiaan (Red Beard) and Leilani from the Full Stops accompanied their guests to a hair salon, where Christiaan (Red Beard) admitted he was completely out of his comfort zone. Laura, on the other hand, admitted that she would want to be a stylist for Huisgenoot's supplementary magazine Mooi [Afrikaans word for 'beautiful'] — a supplement that focuses on beauty and style.

All team members were present when the finishing touches of the makeovers — makeup — was being applied. Thereafter, Leilani (Full Stops) and Laura (Commas) revealed to Wicus (judge) and Haidee (judge) which sponsors they found to enrich the lives of their guests: According to Leilani, Leza's biggest dream is to go on a holiday with her family, which the Full Stops wanted to address. They found sponsors to invite Leza, her husband and her daughter to Knysna, where Leza and her husband had their honeymoon, and also on a four-day MSC Cruises cruise. Laura, on the other hand, revealed that her guest, Riana, wanted to further her studies, which the Commas, in turn, also made possible: They convinced both CityVarsity and the Stellenbosch Institute of Photography & Multimedia Studies to sponsor various short courses for her.

At panel, Izelle (head judge) lauded both teams for a fantastic job, noting that for the first time in the competition, the teams had delivered work that could actually be published. Although the Comma team, according to Izelle, did a better makeover, their copy was sloppy — an indication that they did not keep the reader of their article in mind. The Full Stops, on the other hand, delivered copy that Izelle said had depth, which showed that they interviewed their guest, Leza, really well. In the end, the Full Stops were handed the win, while the Commas were sent to The Chamber.

In The Chamber, it surfaced that Christian had edited both Jeannie and Laura's copy. Jeannie said that Christian worsened their copy on numerous occasions, although she and Laura continually told him not to do so. Izelle instructed the team to vote one of their team members out of the show. The votes were split as follows:

Contestant	Voted For
Christian	Tercia
Jeannie	Tercia
Jolene	Tercia
Laura	Christian
Tercia	Christian

Although Laura cast a vote for Christian, Jeannie surprisingly did not, instead casting a vote against Tercia. Both Christian and Jolene said that Tercia just could not keep up with the pace of the team, and dragged them down. With 3 votes cast against her, Tercia was knocked out of the show, while Christian narrowly avoided an exit with 2 votes cast against him. In a post-elimination interview, an emotional Tercia said that she felt betrayed.

• Eliminated: Tercia Jacobs

=== Episode 7 ===
In episode seven (that aired on 28 August 2012) the top 8 meet the judges at the Jan Kriel School in Kuils River. Izelle (head judge) tells the contestants that teachers and teaching will be the theme of this week's challenge, as education is extremely important to Huisgenoot. Both the Full Stop and Comma teams are dissolved, and the first individual challenge is announced, as the judges want to determine what the writing level of each member in the top 8 is.

The contestants attend a class of one of the teachers at the school in pairs, and then get the chance to do a 15-minute interview with the teacher. They are then tasked to write a 1000-word article in two hours about the teacher, also incorporating a short piece on their favourite teachers when they were in school. At the end of the challenge, the articles are sent to Wicus (judge).

At judging, Izelle criticises most of the articles, especially Jolene, who did not execute the challenge correctly, Jurie, who used no quotes in his work, Laura, who had spelling problems, and Leilani, who did not use paragraphs. Christiaan (Red Beard) and Christian, however, were both lauded for their work; Izelle comically said that Christiaan's (Red Beard's) article was so good that she wanted to kiss him. In a twist, Izelle announced that the bottom-four would get another chance to prove themselves. They would have to interview one of four pupils from the Jan Kriel School at Butterfly World in Stellenbosch, and compile an additional article. Izelle reminds them that the writer of the worst second-round article would be sent home.

The next day, the bottom-four – Jolene, Jurie, Laura and Leilani – do their interviews and compile their articles. Thereafter, they meet the judges in The Chamber. According to Izelle all four listened to the criticism they received, writing articles that were much better than the first round. Laura was singled out as the most improved, who surprised herself after continually playing down her writing. After each contestant motivated why he/she has to stay in Saktyd, Izelle surprised everyone with a second chance. No contestant was eliminated.

• Eliminated: No contestant was eliminated in the seventh episode.

=== Episode 8 ===
In the eighth episode (that aired on 4 September 2012) the top 8 were divided into two groups. Each group had to do a short interview with two stars from the kykNET drama series Vloeksteen: Erica Wessels (who was interviewed by Christiaan [Red Beard], Christian, Jurie and Laura) and Albert Maritz (who was interviewed by Astrid, Jeannie, Jolene and Leilani).

After each interview, every contestant had to direct a Huisgenoot photographer to take pictures for a 1250-word article that sprouted from the interviews. According to the photographers, Christiaan (Red Beard), Jurie and Leilani's direction produced the best photographs. Thereafter, the contestants got two hours to write their articles, and then sent it to Wicus (judge) for the first round of judging.

At judging, Wicus told all the contestants that their articles can be saved with a bit of tweaking, but heavily criticised Laura for spelling mistakes – a problem she was reprimanded for in a previous episode; Wicus told Laura that he would vote her out of the show, if he got the chance to do so. In addition, Leilani was described as a bad writer. On the other hand, Wicus warned all the contestants to keep an eye on Christiaan (Red Beard), who Wicus considered to be everyone's strongest competition. On the back of a successful article in the previous episode, Wicus again lauded Christiaan's (Red Beard's) work. Jurie was also congratulated for his article, but his drastic improvement was met with some suspicion: Wicus told Jurie to promise him that he did not plagiarise.

After judging, the contestants got more time to improve their articles, and then brought their text and photos together in layout, with the help of a layout artist.

At the final judging, Christiaan's (Red Beard's) final product was lauded again, while Jeannie was criticised for wasting Wicus's time by ignoring the advice he gave her. Christian was criticised for pictures that were dull and could bore the reader; although Leilani produced the best pictures, her copy – again – fell flat. As a result of their poor performance, Christian, Jeannie and Leilani were sent to The Chamber.

In The Chamber, the bottom three each got a chance to motivate why they should stay in the show. Before any of the contestants had time to contemplate whether they could vote each other out, Izelle (head judge) immediately sent Leilani packing.

• Eliminated: Leilani Snyman

=== Episode 9 ===
In episode nine (that aired on 11 September 2012), Wicus (judge) shares with the top seven that they would have to gather stories and info for Huisgenoot’s weekly music page, Tempo, on the set of a music video; the music video was filmed as part of Huisgenoot's song writing competition. Each contestant would have to fill their page with a music industry news story, Twitter tweets, photos and a CD review.

On set, all the contestants meet Valiant Swart and Bok van Blerk – two of the Afrikaans music industry's most prominent artists – who help them with quotes and info for their respective articles. But the atmosphere between the contestants is clearly tense, with Christian remarking that most of the contestants are secretive about each other's work; Laura goes as far as to ask the crew on set not to supply any information to the other contestants.

Back at the Naspers building, the contestants start to compile their pages by reviewing a CD by Ray Dylan, and then work with a layout artist to finish their products. Christiaan (Red Beard), Jeannie and Jolene all comment that Christian is irritating most of the contestants, although Christiaan (Red Beard) admits that Christian will probably not get eliminated, as his work is of a high standard.

However, Izelle (head judge) disagrees, noting that none of the contestants really wowed the judges, although most of the pages could be published. Although Jeannie and Jurie are lauded for interesting elements on their pages, Jurie was reprimanded for relaying untrue facts – facts he received first-hand from both Valiant and Bok, who were jokingly supplying wrong information to him; all the contestants are again reminded to check their facts more accurately. But the limelight is solely on Jolene this week, who, according to Izelle, finally discarded her academic writing style and replaced it with the Huisgenoot writing style; she is rewarded with immunity. The other six contestants are all sent to The Chamber.

In The Chamber, Izelle wastes no time, and immediately addresses Laura, who – for a third week in a row – submitted spelling mistakes in her final product; this time, even spelling Valiant's name wrong. Because she showed all the judges that she does not care enough to even work on her main problem (spelling), Izelle eliminated Laura immediately.

In a shocking twist, Izelle announces that she is not done yet. She explains to the contestants that the best journalists are excellent team players, and asks the contestants to vote for the person they think does not have this quality. The results of the votes are as follows:

Contestant	Voted For
Astrid	Christian
Christiaan (Red Beard)	Christian
Christian	Astrid
Jeannie	Christian
Jurie	Astrid

According to Astrid, Christiaan (Red Beard) and Jeannie, Christian only focusses on himself, and does not respect his teammates in team challenges, although Christiaan (Red Beard) includes in his reasoning that Christian is an excellent individual player. With three votes against him, Christian also gets eliminated. In a post-elimination interview, Christian remarks that he – just like Lilian in Episode 4 – feels immensely betrayed by Jeannie, who stabbed him in the back, when he considered her his best friend in the game.

• Eliminated: Laura Stopforth and Christian Lee

=== Episode 10 ===
In episode 10 (that aired on 18 September 2012), the top 5 meet Huisgenoot’s legendary food editor, Carmen Niehaus; according to Haidee (judge), Carmen has been the magazine’s food editor for 21 years. The contestants are tasked with a food journalism challenge: Each of them have to pick a recipe that says something about their heritage, and fill a single page in the magazine with that recipe, a 200-word introduction and photographs. They would have to buy the ingredients for the recipe, and brief two chefs in Huisgenoot’s kitchen on how to prepare the dishes. Once prepared, they would have to style the dishes, and direct a photographer at a food photo shoot. In the end, the page would have to be laid out with the help of a layout artist.

After each contestant phones a family member to get a recipe from them, they buy ingredients and props for their food photo shoots. Thereafter, each of them go into the kitchen one by one to prepare their dishes: Astrid’s green-bean stew, Jeannie’s malva pudding, Jolene’s meat curry and Jurie’s bobotie all turn out perfectly, according to Wicus (judge); but Christiaan’s (Red Beard’s) malva pudding flops completely. According to one of the chefs, the recipe was flawless, but the deep bowl it was baked in, kept the dish from cooking through. Nonetheless, Carmen tried to save one small bowl of the pudding, so that it could be photographed.

During layout, everyone’s layout comes along nicely, although Christiaan (Red Beard) realises that, due to the recipe flopping, only one of his pictures are publishable. But at judging, all his worries are set aside by Carmen, who praises his educational and well-written page. Jeannie is also lauded by Haidee for an outstanding page. Although Izelle (head judge) criticises Astrid for a good, but sloppy, page (especially since she misspelt words like "pepper"), most of the criticism is directed at Jolene and Jurie: According to the judges, both over-complicated their recipes with writing that did not fit the style of the magazine. At a time in the competition where none of the contestants can afford to make mistakes, both Jolene and Jurie are sent to The Chamber.

In The Chamber, both Jolene and Jurie get a chance to motivate why they should stay in the competition, but due to a motivation that fell flat, Jolene gets eliminated.

In an unusual twist, Izelle gives Jurie four envelopes, and instructs him to take it to Astrid, Christiaan (Red Beard) and Jeannie. There, the top 4 discover that each of them received an aeroplane ticket to an unknown destination...

• Eliminated: Jolene Fransman

=== Episode 11 ===
In episode 11 (that aired on 25 September 2012) the top 4 arrive at the Cape Town International Airport at the crack of dawn, where they depart on a commercial flight to an unknown destination. Although all of the contestants speculate that they will be doing their next challenge in Bloemfontein (even before the plane lands there for a layover), they are told that the plane will continue to its final destination: Johannesburg.

There they meet Izelle (head judge) and Ernst Swart, a publicist, at Stark Studios, where the kykNET soapie Binneland is recorded. Each contestant gets two pages in Huisgenoot, and is tasked to fill it with a story of their choice. Each story has to contain a scoop, which the contestants have to gather on the drama's set.

Astrid decides to do a Local is Lekker story on Binneland's 1500th episode, while Jurie decides to do a profile on two upcoming actors on set. Christiaan (Red Beard) investigates a story on an Isidingo actress who is leaving her soapie for Binneland, while Jeannie also decides on a Local is Lekker story about actors and their tattoos. Although Astrid and Jurie go about the set well, with Ernst who comments that Astrid is asking all the right questions, Jeannie struggles to find stories to fill her page. Even though Christiaan (Red Beard) has the biggest scoop, and he also has a really good story, according to Ernst, he struggles with ethical issues, after the actress asks him to keep all the information she gave him confidential, due to various contractual and legal issues.

Back in Cape Town, the top 4 are all criticised by the judges: Astrid filled most of her page with photos, and is criticised for treating her copy shabbily, while Christiaan (Red Beard) is criticised heavily for not breaking the news in his story well; additionally, Jurie is criticised for bad writing. Even though Jeannie was criticised for not asking the right questions, focusing her stories on irrelevant topics, she is lauded for a product that is of a much higher standard than her teammates. She gets rewarded with an automatic spot in the top 3, while the other contestants are all sent to The Chamber.

In The Chamber, each contestant motivates why he/she should stay in the show. After Izelle considers their reasons, noting that she wants to let two people stay who she knows could learn from their mistakes and not make them again, she eliminates Jurie, who made his sixth exit (in 11 episodes) from The Chamber.

• Eliminated: Jurie Prins

=== Episode 12 ===
In the penultimate episode (that aired on 2 October 2012), the top 3 are tasked to put themselves in the shoes of the homeless, and write a unique story about a night in the life of a homeless person. Each contestant gets R100, a sleeping bag and a flash light. They meet a group of homeless dwellers in Cape Town, conduct interviews with them, and have to spend an entire night in the outdoors.

Although Astrid describes the task as an adventure, and Christiaan (Red Beard) says that this task is closest to the type of journalism he is interested in, Jeannie admits that the challenge is not her thing. In the early hours of the morning, winter temperatures drop so low, that all the contestants struggle to sleep.

After a rough night, the top 3 meet the judges for breakfast at the break of dawn; they are shocked to find that the judges also invited a family member of each contestant. They get to spend some time with them, and then get time to compile their articles.

At judging, Izelle (head judge) announces that all three articles had high and low points, and she immediately dismisses everyone to The Chamber. There, Christiaan (Red Beard) is lauded for a phenomenal article, although his ending fell a bit flat. Similarly, Astrid is also lauded for a phenomenal article, although she forgot to write her own experience into the story, and therefore neglected to perform the challenge completely. But most of the criticism is directed at Jeannie, whose article fell flat after she couldn't transport the reader into the life of the homeless. She gets eliminated, leaving Astrid and Christiaan (Red Beard) to vie for the coveted prize at Huisgenoot.

• Eliminated: Jeannie Erasmus

=== Episode 13 ===
In episode 13 – the season finale (that aired on 9 October 2012) – the top 2, Astrid and Christiaan (Red Beard), meet the judges in the assignment room. There, each judge comments on the 11 contestants who were eliminated during the season; the first third of the episode forms a tribute to them.

Thereafter, the top 2 are given two assignments: first, they have to conduct an interview with each other, imagining that the other is the winner of the show; thereafter, each of them attend a formal job interview in front of the three judges and four senior staff members at Media24: Nadia Sadovsky (Huisgenoot's deputy editor and news editor), Lara Atson (journalist at Huisgenoot), Linda Pietersen (editor of YOU magazine) and Wilmer Muller (digital head of Huisgenoot, YOU and Drum magazines). Although both of the finalists complete their interviews with each other and the panel successfully, it is Christiaan (Red Beard) who impresses the panel the most: Linda Pietersen describes him as "delightful", while Nadia Sadovsky asks Izelle if she could hire him herself. However, all of the additional panel members agree that the decision is very difficult, and that they are glad they do not have to pick a winner.

In The Chamber, Izelle tells Christiaan (Red Beard) that it is a disgrace that the media industry in South Africa overlooked him, while she tells Astrid that she is sensitive, connects well with her sources and is a journalist through and through. While the finalists are clearly tense just before the announcement, Izelle announces that both would have to wait a bit longer, as the winner would be announced at Skouspel – the magazine's annual music extravaganza – at Sun City. This meant, that both would have to wait until the entire show aired (c. four months) before the eventual winner is announced.

Four months later, Astrid and Christiaan (Red Beard) are quite tense – and rightly so, after they walk out on stage in front of an audience of 6000, together with the judges and the head of kykNET, Karen Meiring. There, an emotional Christiaan Boonzaier (Red Beard) is declared the winner. In a post-win interview, Christiaan (Red Beard) admitted that his new job intimidates him but that it's a good thing, as he wants his new "magazine family" to challenge him every day. He also jokingly notes that he will be teased for a long time to come about the tears he shed on the Skouspel stage.

- Runner-up: Astrid Lippert-Fisher
- Winner: Christiaan Boonzaier

The season ends here.

== Reception ==
In the Huisgenoot of 6 September 2012, Julia Viljoen (Huisgenoot's editor) wrote in an editorial that Saktyd is one of the top 10 most popular shows on kykNET; with a viewership that peaked on 28 August 2012, Saktyd reached eighth place.
