= Mandoza =

South African kwaito singer (1978–2016)

- Born: Mduduzi Thembinkosi Edmund Tshabalala; 17 January 1978; Soweto, South Africa
- Died: 18 September 2016 (aged 38); Johannesburg, South Africa
- Resting place: Westpark Cemetery, Bloemhof
- Spouse: Mpho Mputhi Tshabalala (m. 2002 - 2016)
- Children: 4
- Musical career
- Genres: Kwaito; hip hop
- Occupations: Musical artist; songwriter; record producer
- Instrument: Vocals
- Years active: 1990s–2016
- Labels: 999 Music Records; EMI Records; CCP Record

Mduduzi Thembinkosi Edmund Tshabalala (17 January 1978 – 18 September 2016), also known as Mandoza, was a South African singer-songwriter and kwaito recording artist. He was known for his contributions to the kwaito genre and his numerous hit singles, including "Nkalakatha", "Uzoyithola Kanjani, Tornado", "Sgelekeqe", "Ngalabesi", "Godoba", "Tsotsi Yase Zola" and "Indoda", which topped the charts in South Africa and all over the African continent. His second album Nkalakatha, released in 2000, became the biggest selling album of his career, selling 350,000 units. He was the founding member of the music group Chiskop.

A biopic which chronicles the life of Mandoza, titled Nkalakatha: The Life of Mandoza premiered on BET on the 16th of August 2023, in which Wiseman Mncube portrayed him.

== Early life ==
Mandoza was born on 17 January 1978 in Zola, a township in Soweto, where he lived with his mother, his grandparents and two sisters. He never knew his father, his mother claiming that he was murdered the same year Mandoza was born. In 1994, at the age of 16, he was charged with stealing a car and received a one-and-a-half-year sentence, which he served in Diepkloof Prison.

== Music career ==
When he was released from prison, Mandoza formed the group "Chiskop" along with three childhood friends, S'bu, Siphiwe aka General and Sizwe. His talents were discovered by Arthur Mafokate, also known as the King of Kwaito. Mandoza was first played on air by DJ Sipho Mbatha, known as Sgqemeza, of Durban Youth Radio and then of Ukhozi FM. Mandoza aimed to deliver messages of inspiration to the kwaito music scene. He used his music as a way to encourage young South Africans to achieve their goals. His song "Uzoyithola Kanjani" means: "how are you going to get it, if you don't get up and go for it." He credited much of his success to his mentor, Glenn Morris, who helped him during his drug addled early years.

The group signed its first record contract eight years after its formation and released their debut album titled, Akusheshi with the hit single "Klaimer" followed by their second album Relax in 1997. Although Chiskop achieved great success and was widely seen to be at kwaito's forefront, Mandoza also started a solo career. In 1999 he released the top-selling (more than 100,000 units sold) album 9II5 Zola South, for which he gained a 2000 FNB South African Music Awards Best Newcomer nomination.

In 2000, he then released his second album Nkalakatha, produced by Gabi Le Roux, to widespread acclaim, selling 350 000 copies which won multi-platinum status. The title track became a crossover hit and reached the top of the charts on both traditionally black and white radio stations. Other hit songs of the album were Virstaan & Skhathi Sewashi featuring Tokollo from the kwaito group Tkzee. This album won the Best Kwaito Music Album category and the album's title track won the Song of the Year category at the South African Music Awards in 2001. Mandoza also won in five of the ten categories at the 2001 Metro Music Awards: Best Kwaito Artist, Best Male Vocalist, Best Album, Best Styled Artist and Song Of The Year. He soon followed up with his third studio album Godoba selling 150 000 copies with the hit singles Godoba, Jerusalema & 50/50. Also in 2001, Mandoza won the Best Artist – Southern Africa category at the Kora All Africa Music Awards and won two awards at the South African Music Awards for Godoba Song of the year and Video of the year in 2002. The success continued further more releasing his fourth studio album Tornado which sold 50 000 copies within its release. In 2003, Mandoza participated in the documentary film SHARP! SHARP! – the kwaito story, directed by Aryan Kaganof and reunited with his Chiskop band members General Gtz & S'bu on releasing their 6th album titled Sunday. In 2004 he released the fifth studio album self titled Mandoza where he teamed up with top DJ and producer DJ Cleo releasing the hit single Sgelekeqe. The album also featured another hit single titled Indoda and the album sold double platinum 100 000 Copies. Mandoza was voted 77th in the Top 100 Great South Africans in 2004. In February 2005 it was announced that Mandoza would play a major supporting role in a new South African-made rugby union-themed feature film, Number 10, which would be directed by Academy Award nominee Darrell James Roodt. It was also announced that Mandoza would be contributing to the film's soundtrack.

Mandoza sang in several of South Africa's many languages, including English, Afrikaans, Zulu, and Xhosa, giving him wide appeal with South African listeners. Mandoza's music tried to "put a more constructive message into kwaito." Originally, Mandoza did not like the kwaito style, because of its lack of a message and tendency to focus on dancing and pleasure rather than on the plethora of social problems that exist in South Africa, even after apartheid ended in 1994. Mandoza also recorded Rap/Metal collaboration with Croatian rock singer Dino Jelusic on songs "Bad to the Bone" and "In Our Blood". "In Our Blood" is a song dedicated to rhinos killed in 2015.

At the 1st ceremony of Mzansi Kwaito and House Music Awards, he was honoured with Lifetime Achievement Award.

== Death ==
Mandoza died on 18 September 2016. According to his family, he was being treated for pharyngeal cancer prior to his death and had lost his eyesight. Mandoza waited in vain for at least three hours for an ambulance at his home, as a last resort his manager used a private vehicle to transport Mandoza to hospital but he died in the car just before arriving at the Charlotte Maxeke Johannesburg Academic Hospital.

== Awards ==
- 2001 South African Music Awards (SAMA) Song of the Year for Nkalakatha
- 2001 South African Music Awards (SAMA Best Kwaito Album
- 2001 Metro Fm Music Awards Best Kwaito Artist
- 2001 Metro Fm Music Awards Best Male Vocalist
- 2001 Metro Fm Music Awards Best Album
- 2001 Metro Fm Music Awards Best Styled Artist
- 2001 Metro Fm Music Awards Song of the Year
- 2001 Kora All Africa Music Awards Best Artist – Southern Africa
- 2002 South African Music Awards (SAMA) Best Music Video For Godoba
- 2002 South African Music Awards (SAMA) Song of the Year For Godoba
- 2006 Channel O Musical Video Awards – Best Collaboration Video ("Music") (with Danny K)
- 2012 Namibian Annual Music Awards (NAMAS) Best Music Video With Ees
- 2012 Channel O Musical Video Awards Best Kwaito Award For Ayoba With Ees
- 2013 Nominated For Best Kwaito Album Sgantsontso
- 2023 South African Music Awards (SAMA) Lifetime Achievement Award

== Solo albums ==
- 1999 9II5 Zola South
- 2000 Nkalakatha
- 2000: Nkalakatha (The Boss Remixes)
- 2001: Godoba
- 2002: Tornado
- 2004: Mandoza
- 2004: Same Difference – (with Danny K)
- 2005: Phunyuka Bamphethe
- 2006: Ngalabesi
- 2007: Champion
- 2008: Ingwenya
- 2010: Real Deal
- 2011: So Fresh
- 2013: Sgantsontso
