= Capax Infiniti =

Mural in Portland, Oregon

- Holding the Infinite (English)
- The mural in March 2016
- Artist: Faith47
- Year: 2014
- Type: Mural
- Location: Portland, Oregon, United States; 45.52134°N 122.68282°W
- Website: faith47.com/capax-infiniti/

Capax Infiniti, or Capax Infiniti (Holding the Infinite), is a 2014 mural by South African artist Faith47, painted on the side of the Carlyle Building, located at 1114 Southwest Washington Street, in downtown Portland, Oregon, in the United States.

== Description ==
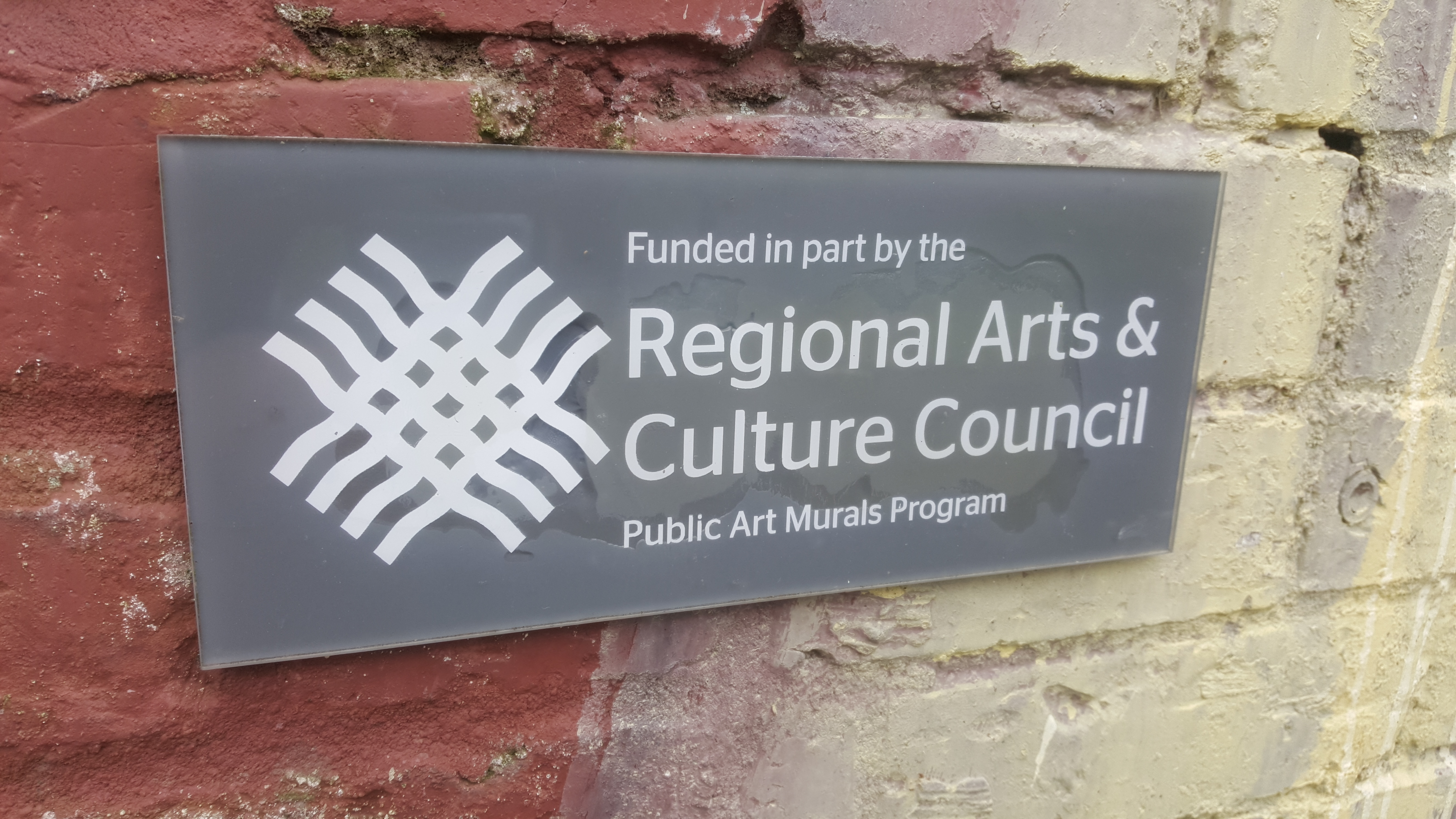
Nearby plaque

The mural depicts a slightly disheveled woman looking away from the viewer, and wringing her hands behind her back. The artist said of the work that "I want it to look like it’s been there for a long time. I enjoy working with things that are slightly ghostly. It’s like existing in two spaces at once."

== History ==
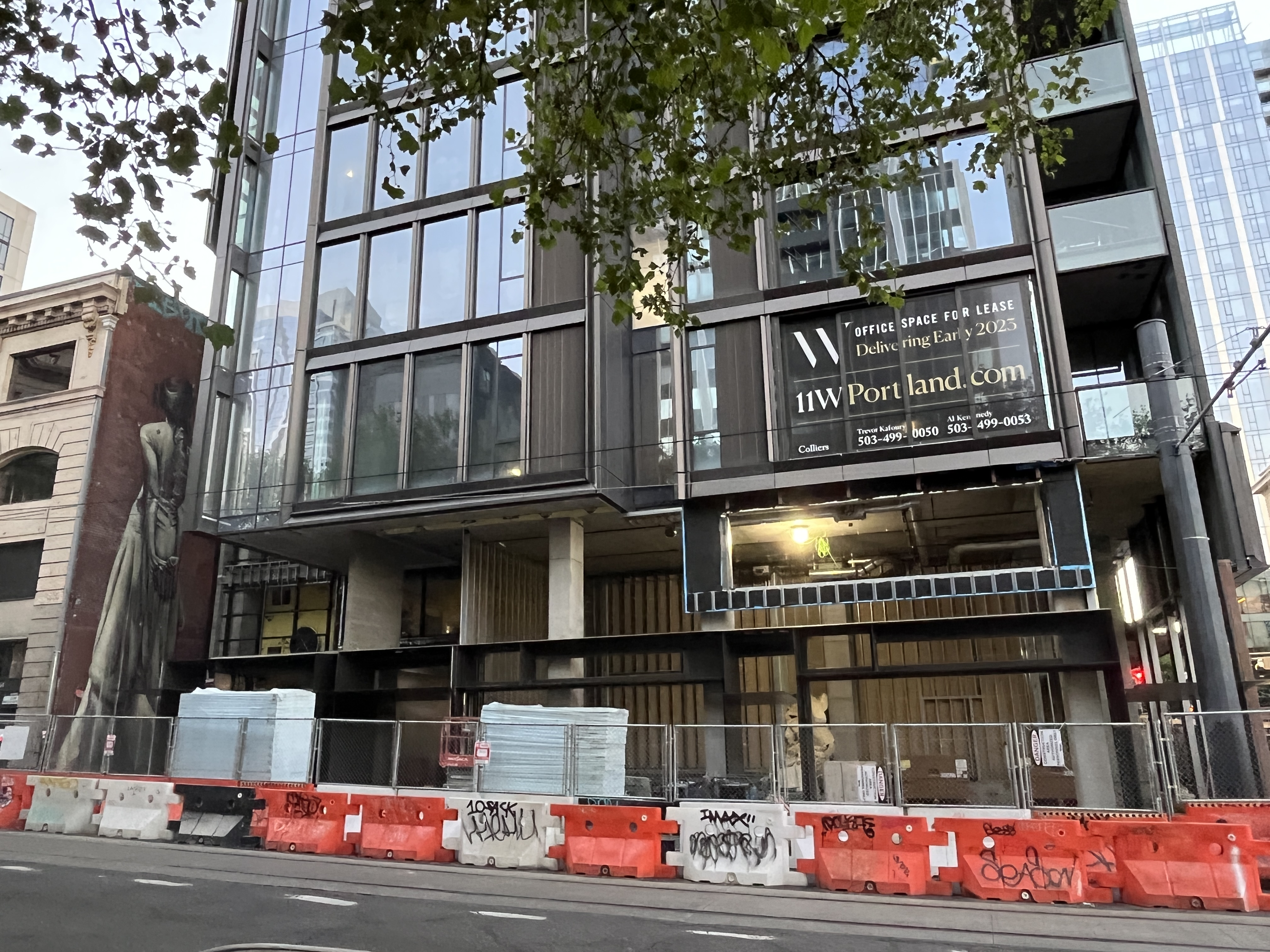
The mural with adjacent building construction, 2022

The painting was funded by the Public Art Murals Program and private donors, and is administered by the Regional Arts & Culture Council. The project was facilitated by the nonprofit mural project Forest for the Trees.

The mural is expected to remain visible despite construction of Eleven West, according to The Oregonian.

== Reception ==
Marta Yousif of the Daily Vanguard included Capax Infiniti in her 2019 list of "Top 10 Most Instagrammable Murals in Portland". Parade's Kristin Luna said the mural was Oregon's best in her 2019 overview, "Murals Across America: The Very Best Street Art in Every State".

== See also ==
- 2014 in art
