= Prophets of Da City =

South African hip-hop group

- Also known as: P.O.C.
- Origin: Cape Town, South Africa
- Genres: Hip hop
- Years active: 1988–2001
- Labels: Ku Shu Shu Records, Tusk Music, Ghetto Ruff, Nation Records
- Members: Shaheen; Ishmael; DJ Ready D Ramone; Mark Heuvel

Prophets of Da City (POC) is a hip hop crew from Cape Town, South Africa. They are composed of about eight members, though the exact membership fluctuates frequently; these include Ishmael Morabe (vocals), Mark Heuvel (dance), Shaheen Ariefdien, Ramone and DJ Ready D. Their style uses elements of hip hop music, reggae and traditional African rhythms. Their albums include Our World (1990), Boom Style (1992), Age of Truth (1993), Phunk Phlow (1994), Universal Souljaz (1995), and Ghetto Code (1997). They are currently signed under the independent record label Ghetto Ruff.

== History ==
=== 1988–1990: Early years ===
The group began in late 1988 when Shaheen and Ready D experimented in a small 8-track studio (owned by Shaheen's father, Issy Ariefdien and Lance Stehr the current Ghetoruff CEO) and produced a demo that ultimately became "Our World" (1990), the first South African hip hop release. Although the production value was not exactly stellar it did attempt to interpret hiphop through their unique Cape Town influences and experiences (both musically and lyrically). The album had the first recorded Cape slang (local Afrikaans dialect) hip-hop song called 'Dala Flat' (do it thoroughly). It also consisted of an uptempo goema inspired 'Stop the Violence' and the hip house meets mbaqanga title track. It also featured the Abdullah Ibrahim inspired "Roots" that featured DJ A-ski on the turntables. Although POC was quite a novelty to the South African music scene, record labels were turned off by their social commentary and favoured a more party music approach. Lance, POC manager, set up Ku-shu shu Records and signed a distribution and marketing deal through Teal Trutone (Gallo subsidiary). In 1990 POC was nominated for the OKTV Award for Best New Group. They also embarked on an extensive 80-leg anti-drug school tour that reached an average of 70 000 students.

=== 1991–1992: Boom Style ===
The second release in late 1991 was Boom Style (referring to the hardhitting punch of a TR-808 drum machine kick drum or self-praise of the way the music is kicking – although often mistaken to mean "tree style" because boom means "tree" in Afrikaans). While the album had a scathing attack on the apartheid regime in the song 'Ons Stem' (meaning our voice – as a response to the apartheid national anthem 'die stem' – the voice) and the innovative Hard Time on Stage, the follow-up to Murder on Stage from Our World, it was less experimental. The lead single, Boom Style, like their first single, Our World, aimed to fuse contemporary US hiphop influenced dance music with mbaqanga styled guitar riffs. While Our World was rather innocent and daring for its time, Boom Style reflected the realities of operating within the music industry and the pressures of the market on POC. The censorship board sent a formal letter to the label to express their displeasure over the use of the Afrikaner national anthem in which POC not only mocked 'Die Stem', but also disrespected Afrikaner and other colonial political icons. Their live shows incorporated all aspects of hip hop culture and not only emceeing. Turntablism, Breakdancing and even aerosol art at times were used to not only present POC but represent hip hop culture and expose to parts of South Africa where people did not know what hip hop was. The video for 'Kicking Non Stop' was censored because members of the crew put a portrait of the then president, P. W. Botha, in a fridge to chill. This year the POC social issues based tour covered another 45 schools.

In 1992 they were invited by Quincy Jones and Caiphus Semenya to perform at the Montreux Jazz Festival in Switzerland. This year they embarked on a Namibian anti-drug campaign, covering 65 schools. They also got increasingly more involved in facilitating workshops on deejaying, b-boying and developing hip hop writing techniques. Leading up to the first democratically held election in South Africa, POC embarked on a national voter education campaign. Although Issy Ariefdien has been involved in group's production since the first album, POC also brought former rival Patrick Hickey a.k.a. Caramel (then an emcee and producer with emcees from U.N.C.L.E.) on board as part of the production team for the Age of Truth album.

=== 1993 and beyond ===
In late 1993 POC was invited to perform in Denmark at the Visions of Africa music festival and also embarked on a national voter education tour, covering high schools, community centres and universities. The aim was to explain the voting process to youth who never had the opportunity to vote in any national elections. The democratically held election marked an important moment in the history of South Africa, but also the history of hip hop in South Africa, because it was an acknowledgment of the popularity and power of hiphop as a pedagogical tool.

In 1994, POC performed at the inauguration of Nelson Mandela where they sang their song "Excellent, finally black President". The fact that they were invited was extremely important to them. The members of Prophets of Da City grew up during apartheid and this truly meant a lot to the group. Mark Schwartz writes, "Times were good until one day in 1985 when tanks rolled down the main drag of Mitchell's Plain Township, and Ready and his homie Shaheen put down the vinyl and picked up bricks and gasoline bombs to hurl at apartheid's army. For the next nine years, through a state of emergency, political upheaval, and economic turmoil, Ready, Shaheen and their posse Prophets of Da City persevered until finally they got to drop bombs at another revolution, as the only performers at the inauguration of South Africa's president Nelson Mandella". This step for POC was not only major for racial barriers but for rap in South Africa. This has been considered the song that brought hip hop more into the mainstream of South Africa when previously, hip hop had been more of an underground movement whose fans consisted mainly of the poorer class in the urban areas of Cape Town.

In 2006 Sean Drummond and Dylan Valley, two student filmmakers, tracked down the whereabouts of the POC members. The documentary titled Lost Prophets was screened at various film festivals in South Africa.

POC celebrated 20 years since the release of South Africa's first hip hop album, 'Our World' in 2015.

== Inspiration ==
Inspired by the production styles of the Bomb Squad (Public Enemy) and Boogiemen (Ice Cube), Age of Truth is arguably their most militant and musically daring album. This album is generally considered South Africa's first hip hop classic album. Although Age of Truth won album of the year in various publications, the majority of the songs were banned. The 1993 song Understand Where I'm Coming From provides background for some of the struggles about which POC raps by explaining many of the hardships faced in daily life. "The song is about empowering yourself as an individual and moving forward as a community" claims musician Ready D. "Understand Where I'm Coming From" also appeared on the Tommy Boy Planet Rap album which featured 12 hip hop crews from around the world. The album was recorded and mixed at Bop Studios in the then Bantustan, Bophutatswana. The head engineer at Bop Studios worked with POC before and offered them a deal to record an album at an extraordinary reduced rate. POC found out that the aim behind Bop Studios was to entice big music stars to record there to legitimise Bophutatswana as a sovereign state. When the group heard about this while they recorded there, they included the lines "Fuck Mangope (Bophutatswana's head of fake state) even if we record here". The head engineer confiscated all the mixed DATs and confronted the group about certain remarks made on the album. After a heated debate the group left with a 'stolen' backup copy of the mixed album that eventually became the released version.

== Lyrical themes ==
POC's songs were often filled with socio-political messages about the state of South Africa's social and economic issues in the urban areas, which were the most economically depressed. According to the article "Globalization and Gangster Rap: Hip Hop in the Post-Apartheid City", their 1993 song "Understand Where I'm Coming From" was a "lament about poverty and social dislocation in the ghetto, questioning the wisdom of patriotism in a class stratified society", as can be inferred from the opening of the song: "Why should I fight for a country's glory / When it ignores me? / Besides, the township's already a war zone / So why complain or moan?" The song also questions the degree to which this new post-Apartheid South Africa is actually new, since there are still racial and class inequalities throughout the communities. The music created as a result of these types of struggles takes the form of hip hop because "young African and Coloured youth... see hip hop and its subcultures as the art form that best expresses their feelings of economic marginality and social dislocation". Many connections can be seen between POC's style of hip hop and the broader American style of hip hop. In "Understand where I'm Coming From", feelings of rebellion and separation from central government are rapped about just as they might be in politically conscious American hip hop; also, in the POC song "Dallah Flet 2", "negative and misogynistic attitudes towards single mothers" are rapped about, something which author Zine Magubane claims is "ubiquitous in American rap music". POC's gender politics on Age of Truth was first analysed in a 2001 article titled “Black Thing: Hip-Hop Nationalism, ‘Race’ and Gender in Prophets of da City and Brasse vannie Kaap” by Adam Haupt, who argued that some of the gender-based problems on this album could partly be explained by the crew's black nationalist politics. Black nationalism, like other forms of nationalism, tended to privilege patriarchal imperatives and marginalised female subjects. Hip-hop nationalism in the early 90s reflected some of these problems. As Haupt's analysis of Cape hip-hop activism in the book Stealing Empire reveals, POC's work is best compared to black nationalist US hip-hop of the late 80s and late 90s—and not gangsta rap, as suggested by “Globalization and Gangster Rap: Hip Hop in the Post-Apartheid City”. This is particularly significant in the light of their parody of gangsta rap on songs like "Wack MCs" off Phunk Phlow. Stealing Empire contends that the sometimes simplistic cultural imperialism thesis in some scholarship about hip-hop beyond the US is limited when considering the artistic and political agency of activists and artists who hope to use hip-hop as a means to engage youth critically about their lives in South African townships. By way of caution, Magubane's article credits the Black Consciousness song "Black Thing" to Black Noise when it was, in fact, composed and recorded by POC.

== Notable co-performances ==
The group has also performed around famous artists like James Brown, Public Enemy, The Fugees, Ice-T, Quincy Jones and more.
