= Faith47 =

South African artist

Faith47 Faith XLVII
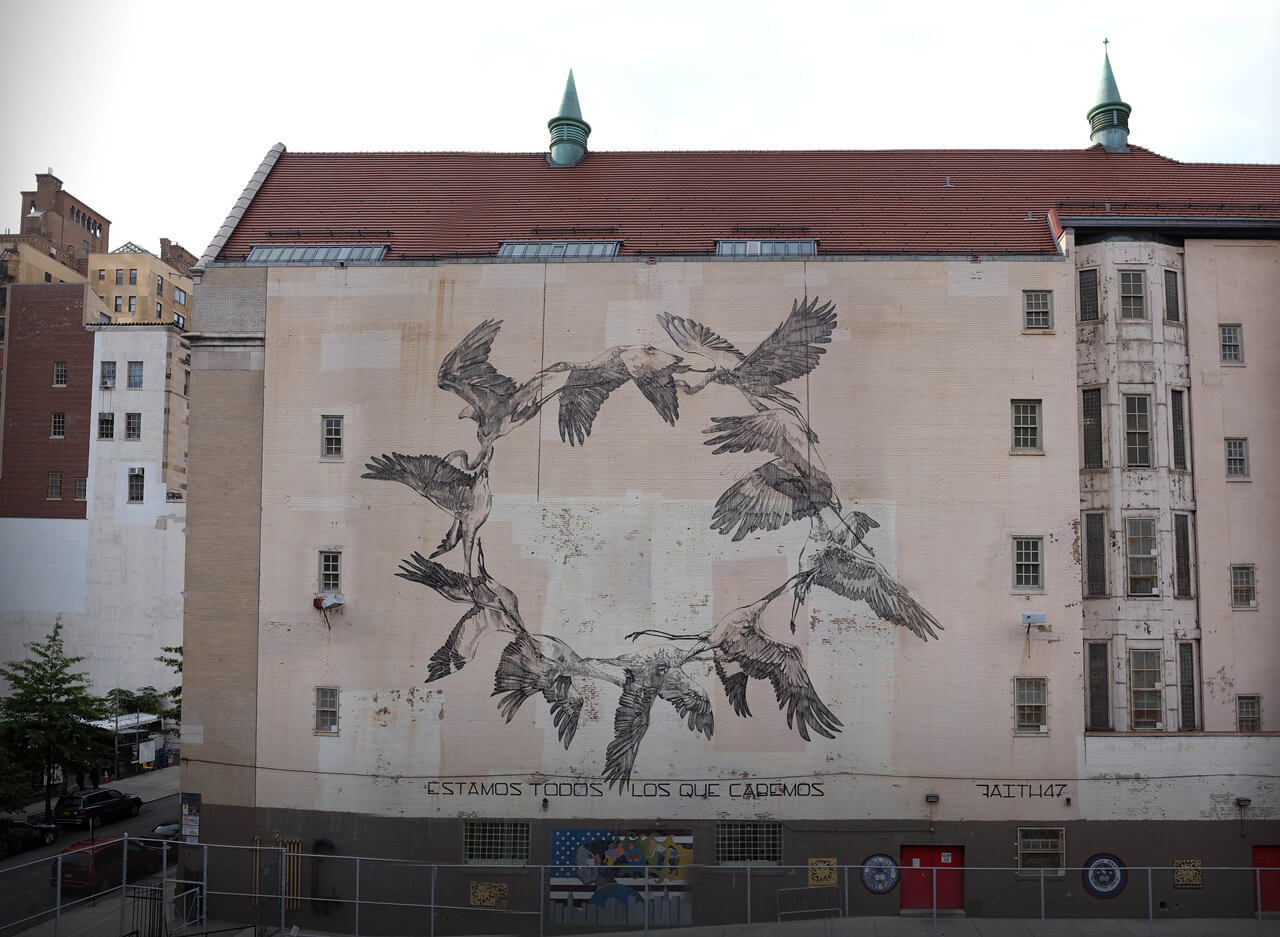
- Estamos Todos Los Que Cabemos, Harlem, 2015
- Born: 1979 (age 46–47); Cape Town
- Notable work: Medicinal Flowers of Lebanon
- Movement: Multidisciplinary artist
- Website: faith47.com

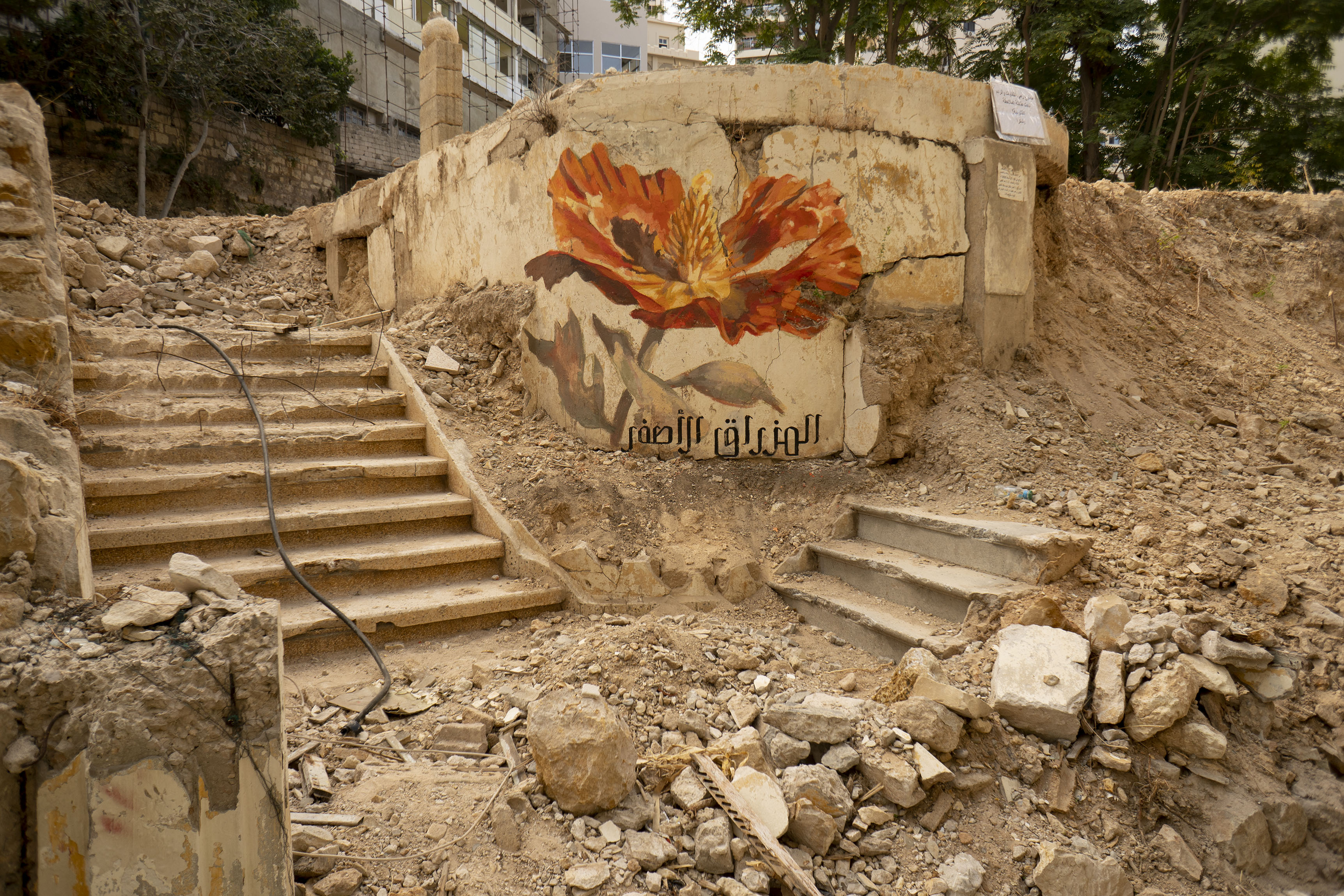
Glaucium flavum - Medicinal Flowers of Lebanon, Beirut 2021

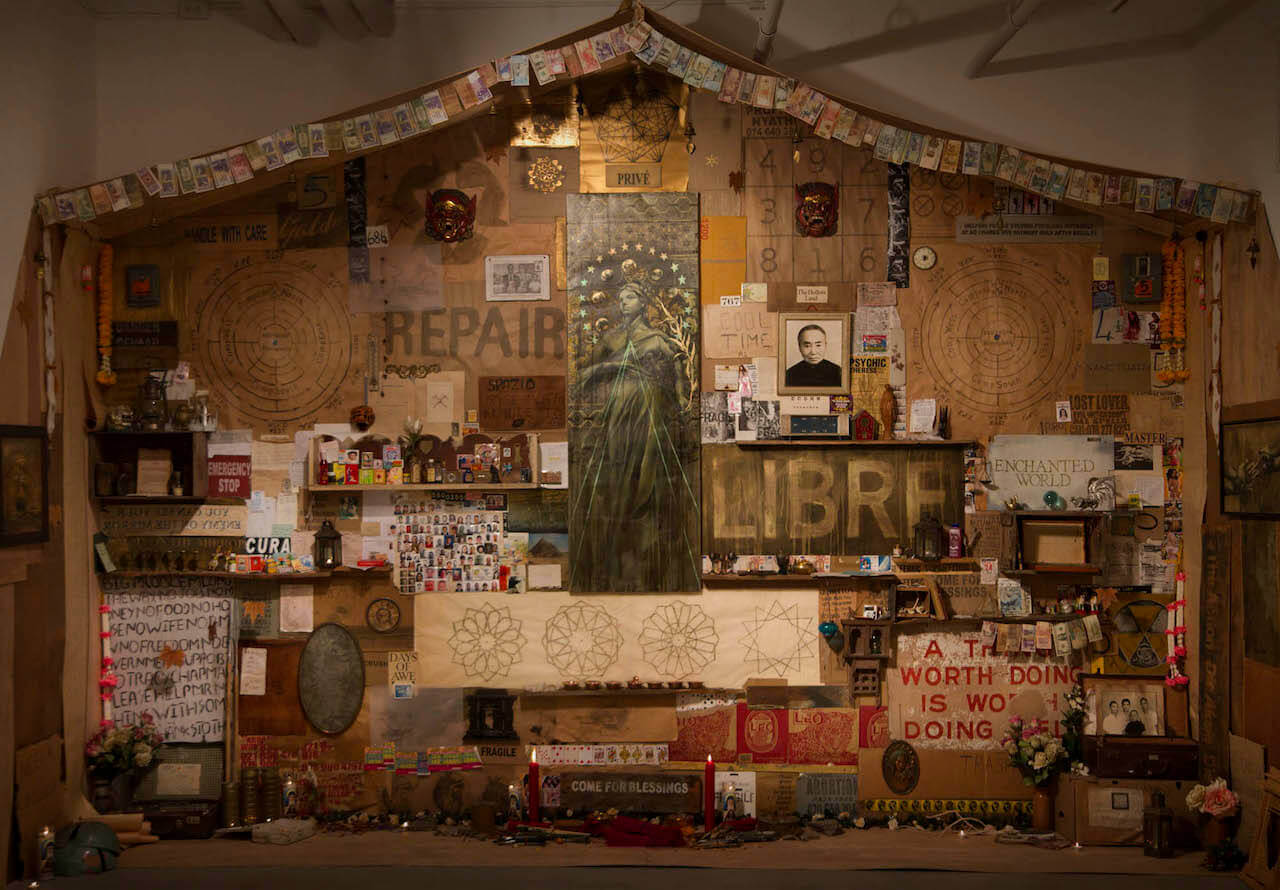
Shrine, Aqua Regalia – Chapter Two, 2015

Faith47 or Faith XLVII (born Cape Town, 1979) is a South African interdisciplinary artist. Her inaugural museum exhibition CLAIR OBSUR took place at the Museum of Fine Arts of Nancy (2023). She has held solo exhibitions in San Francisco (2025), Paris (2023), Cape Town (2021), Miami (2018), New York City (2015), London (2014) and Johannesburg (2012).

== Career ==
Faith47 began painting in 1997, three years after the end of apartheid. Using a wide range of media, her approach is explorative and substrate appropriate – from found and rescued objects, to time-layered and history-textured city walls, to studio-prepared canvas and wood.

Common themes across Faith47's work include sacred and mundane spaces as well as political problems, from environmental destruction, border abolition, and humanitarian issues. Her female figures speak to female empowerment. Her art and rich symbolism speaks to issues of injustice, poverty, and inequality. Her murals are often referred to as post-apartheid, as they confront the failure of neo-liberal politics of the South African Freedom Charter in violent and impoverished townships in South Africa. Her works are often associated with spirituality. In one of Faith47's books she writes, "I am not religious but I pray through my work to unknown devils and gods. I look for my soul in colors and empty my being through parables of rusted, lost metal doors." She also has mentioned in an interview her process of urban exploration in which she feels spirits, "In empty buildings that felt like spiritual experiences, exploring holy chambers of neglected architecture... finding something so beautiful in what society disregards, and bringing to life that which usually people throw away or ignore." One can see the influence on environment in her site specific works, exploring abandoned spaces in her work is a recurring basis.

Faith47 has a son, Keya Tama. Keya was born in 1997 and is an artist who has worked under the alias' Cashril Plus and Jack Fox before finally settling on his given name, Keya Tama.

Faith47 has been extensively traveling and creating site-specific artwork globally since 2006. Her artwork can be found in over 50 cities worldwide. Faith47 is a self-taught artist. Her schooling came through graffiti art of which she began in 1997. Her move into contemporary gallery and studio environment, as well as her exploitive directions into multimedia projects can define Faith47 as a multidisciplinary artist and in a league quite unique in her own. Faith47 has been primarily based in South Africa. From 2017 to 2020, she was resident in Los Angeles. From 2020 till present Faith47 has been nomadic, while her son Keya is currently living in New York.

== Solo exhibitions ==
2012, Fragments of a Burnt History, David Krut Gallery, Johannesburg. Faith's first solo exhibition considered the transformation of Johannesburg into a more representative African city.

2014, Aqua Regalia – Chapter One, Moniker Projects, London.

2015,Aqua Regalia – Chapter Two, Jonathan LeVine Gallery, New York.

2018, ELIXIR, Fabien Castanier Gallery, Miami. Elixir was a multi-disciplinary exhibition conceived by Faith47

2021, CHANT, Everard Read Gallery, Cape Town. Through this multidisciplinary exhibition in her hometown, CHANT investigates how to deal with personal events, natural disasters and disruptive external situations.

2023, CLAIR OBSCUR, Musée des Beaux-Arts de Nancy, France This is Faith's first Museum exhibition, the collection comprises wax-crayon drawings, stitched-map tapestries, installations, videos, and Polaroids that reflect on the fundamental duality between light and dark.

2025, VENARUM MUNDI, Heron Arts, San Francisco, USA Through the delicate and labor-intensive process of deconstruction and reassembly, Faith47 invited the viewer into an exploration of the economic and geopolitical systems that structure our world. Using the materiality of discontinued currency, maps, and flags, the artist wove together complex commentaries on value, borders, and the shifting forces that shape our global reality.

== Notable public art ==
Following an active street art career spanning more than fifteen years, Faith47's work can now be found in cities around the world. Notable works include:

2010, The Freedom Charter, South Africa

Taking her inspiration from the old political slogans and stencils that were used during the struggle against apartheid, Faith47 used sentences from the Freedom Charter document that she felt were still pressing in South Africa.

2012, The Taming of the Beasts, Shanghai

Faith47 painted ghostly rhinos on Shanghai walls at a time when the number of rhinos being poached for their horns was rising rapidly to meet demand from Asia.

2012, The Long Wait, Johannesburg

These murals, of groups of men in various postures of waiting, reference photographs from Alexia Webster's photographic series, Waiting for Work. The works imply different kinds of waiting particular to a contemporary South African context. As Faith47 told Wooster Collective, "Miners are waiting for justice. Workers are waiting for a living wage. People are waiting for service delivery. Refugees are waiting for assistance. Men are waiting for jobs. We are all waiting for an honest politician. So many people are waiting for others to do things first. To take the blame. To do things for them. To take the fall. To build the country. To admit defeat. There has been so much waiting in this country that much time has been lost."

2014, Harvest, Cape Town

A partnership between Faith47, Design Indaba and ThingKing, the multi-story artwork lit up at night each time enough money was raised for one new light to be installed on a pathway in the informal settlement of Monwabisi Park, Khayelitsha, through the organisation VPUU (Violence Prevention through Urban Upgrading). The intricate lighting pattern was an artistic endeavour that also served as a reminder that there were communities in the city that lack the luxury of light, which is a major public safety concern.

2015, The Psychic Power of Animals, New York

With this series, Faith47 reintroduced nature back into the urban metropolis.i "There's an inherent irony in recreating nature on cement, so the series is a nostalgic reminder of what we've lost but also an attempt to reintegrate that into the present," Faith47 said. "We have become so distanced from nature, so these murals are an attempt to reconnect us with the natural world."

2015, Estamos Todos Los Que Cabemos, Harlem

Painted as part of the Monument Art NYC project's focus on immigration, Estamos Todos Los Que Cabemos utilises the migratory patterns of birds, observing that nature ignores human borders on a map. “We forget that the dividing lines specifying countries were merely drawn by politically hungry men. In reality, the earth is open. There are no countries, no borders, it belongs to no one. We are transient visitors and should travel as we please," Faith47 told Arrested Motion.

2016, Landfill Meditation, South Africa

Landfill Meditation reflects on the notion of progress and the waste that it leaves behind.

2017, 21.10.2015, Cape Town & Munich

This collaboration between Faith47 and Imraan Christian, 21.10.2015 is a series of three works, first exhibited at Everard Read gallery in Cape Town. The installation's starting point was an image taken by Imraan during the 2015 #feesmustfall student protests in Cape Town. The photograph documents the moment when peaceful protestors reacted violently as a response to sustained police brutality.

2018, Salus Populi Suprema Lex Esto, Los Angeles

This project took the form of site-specific mural entitled “Salus Populi Suprema Lex Esto”, painted on Skid Row, Los Angeles. The large-scale public installation adorns the city wall, giving space to the homeless.

2018, The Unbound, San Francisco

Painted in San Francisco, The Unbound series covers the UC Hastings University of Law Building in the Tenderloin. ‘The Unbound’ is an ode to the Peace Manifesto, a request a ceasefire. “Watching the disharmony, the dismantling of human rights and the continuous struggle for equality is exhausting. The only way I can keep going is if I can transform some of this into my work.” Faith47 tells BOOOOOOOM.

2019, Ad Pacem, Cincinnati

Created in collaboration with artist, Inka Kendzia, Faith47 created a projection-mapped mural in Cincinnati during the Blink Light Festival. Faith's mural, thematically based on Eirene, the Greek goddess of peace, highlights working towards a society that functions on open communication and inclusion. AD PACEM received the CODA AWARDS for best Residential Artwork in 2023.

2019, Mon Coeur, Lyon

In the weeks leading up to the sixth Global Fund Replenishment Conference, Faith completed a mural on the Maternity Ward of the Croix-Rousse hospital in Lyon. It was revealed along with 25 murals and installations, as part of a coordinated campaign across the globe (RED), aimed to drive heat and awareness around the AIDS fight.

2019, The Silent Watcher, Philadelphia

In Philadelphia, Faith completed her largest mural to date, as of 2019. Standing 11.000 square feet tall, this piece pays tribute to Noam Chomsky.

2021, Medicinal Flowers of Lebanon, Beirut

Faith's series, ‘Medicinal Flowers of Lebanon’ contrasts the forms of medicinal flowers to the landscape, the metaphorical works in Medicinal Flowers of Lebanon lead “us along the brittle sites of Beirut, tracing past and present scars etched into the city,” the artist says. “Each flower urges us in a sense, towards healing as they grow out of the concrete.”

== Immersive art ==
- 2017, 2018, 2019, Astronomia Nova, Hologram - Sweden
- 2017, Mysterium Tremendum, Hologram - Miami
- 2017, 2018,Upper Atmospheric Lightning, Video Installation - Berlin, Cape Town
- 2017, 2019,Aurum, Performance - Berlin, Cape Town
- 2018, ЗОЛОТАЯ СЕРЕДИНА / The Golden Middle, Light Installation - Moscow
- 2018,2021The Disintegration of Self, Video Installation - London, Cape Town
- 2019, Ad Pacem, Projection Mapping Mural - Cincinnati
- 2021, Desecration Earth, Everard Read Gallery, Cape Town
- 2023, Gravity's Law, Musée des Beaux-arts de Nancy
- 2023, Source Des Voeux, Musée des Beaux-arts de Nancy
- 2023, The Illuminated Hour, Musée des Beaux-arts de Nancy

== Sculptural Work ==
- 2020, 'The Human Cause I, II, III' Brass and wood Sculpture.
- 2020, 'Empire' Bronze Sculpture.
- 2022, 'Sœr' Bronze Sculpture.
- 2024, 'Empire, Large-Scale' Bronze Sculpture.

== Reception ==
Faith47's work has been featured in The Guardian, The New York Times, The Huffington Post, and The Independent.

"Faith47 celebrates the commonplace as holy in an attempt to disarm strategies of global realpolitik and advance the expression of personal truth. In this way her work is both an internal and spiritual release that speaks to the complexities of the human condition, its deviant histories and existential search." Juxtapoz

"Using different mediums, including graphite, spray paint, oil paint, ink, photography and collage, she usually paints on found objects or discarded documents, transferring the feel of her mural works. The transparency of her mark making and the texture of finished works give them a sense of age and spirituality. Often mixing religious iconography with ordinary, everyday elements and geometrical objects, her paintings, drawings and sketches seem to have an almost sacramental importance." Arrested Motion

“A South African artist whose textured imagery brings spirituality and nature to the foreground of urban environments." Huffington Post

"A rare incantation of both the earthly and the transcendent." Mass Appeal

"Transformative work... concerned with the valuation and transformation of things that have been lost or overlooked." Booooooom

"Deeply profound visions existing as physical aesthetic gifts for other viewers." Supersonic Art

"Equally at home in grimy alleys as she is in a studio, she creates murals that are both breathtaking and poignant. I challenge anyone to look at her work and not feel a little overawed by her talent." Carte Blanche

== See also ==
- The Creators: South Africa Through the Eyes of Its Artists (2012)
- Capax Infiniti (2014)
