= Chiskop =

South African music group

- Origin: Soweto, Johannesburg, South Africa
- Genre: Kwaito
- Years active: Late 1990s – 2000s
- Past members: Simphiwe “General GTZ” Sibisi; Mduduzi “Mandoza” Tshabalala; Sizwe “Lollipop” Motaung; Sibusiso “SB-Bless” Thanjekwayo

Chiskop was a pioneering South African kwaito group formed in 1995 by four childhood friends: Simphiwe “General GTZ” Sibisi, Mduduzi “Mandoza” Tshabalala, Sizwe “Lollipop” Motaung, and Sibusiso “SB-Bless” Thanjekwayo, from Soweto, Johannesburg.
