= Ghetto Ruff =

South African based record label

GHETTO RUFF
- Founded: 1980s
- Founder: Lance Stehr
- Status: Active
- Genre: Various
- Country of origin: South Africa

GHETTO RUFF is an independent South African recording label specializing in kwaito, hip hop, soul, house, gospel and rhythm and blues. Having been formed around the need to have a voice against apartheid GR released Prophets of da City who had tracks banned by the government of the day.

Currently, Ghetto Ruff Records known as Mlominent artists including Prophets of Da City (POC), Ishmael, Skeem, OdaMeesta, ASHAAN, Brickz, Zola 7, Pitch Black Afro, Mapaputsi, DJ Cleo, Bravo, Brown Dash, Mzekezeke, DJ What What, Skomplazi, Amu, Brassie Vannie Kaap, Tuks, Morafe, Jozi, Da Les, Bongani Fassie, Vusi NOVA, Nathi, NANCY G, BISHOP LOUIS, RUFF X, RJ Bejamin, Drenko, Kyllex, Malik, MCHANGANI, Gumshev, Metswako, Slice, SpyKos were just some of the releases.

== History ==
Ghetto Ruff came to be in the late 1980s when Lance Stehr (current managing director of the label) formed the Cape Town-based hip hop group, Prophets of Da City. POC did extremely well in South Africa as well as internationally. In many ways POC enabled Stehr to expand and grow the label into the premiere kwaito label in South Africa today. South Africa's R&B star Ishmael was born out of POC and in 1996 he helped Ghetto Ruff Records enter the kwaito genre when the group Skeem was formed, another splinter group of POC was the acclaimed Afrikaans hip hop group Brasse Vannie Kaap. With this foundation, Stehr was able to discover and nurture most probably the most artists from an independent label resulting in hundreds of thousands of record sales over the year.

Stehr also produced the sound track for YIZO YIZO, TSOTSI (OSCAR WINNER), and went on to TV to do JOZI - MOVING THE CITY, FLY CHIX and SKYROOM LIVE.

== Artists ==
- Kaybee (legendary music producer/artist)
- Amu (rapper)
- Bishop Louis
- Bongani Fassie
- Bravo
- Zola
- Brickz
- BVK : Brasse Vannie Kaap
- DJ Cleo
- Drencko
- FIESTA BLACK
- Gumshev
- Ishmael
- Jozi
- Kyllex
- Malik
- Mchangani
- Metswako
- Mgarimbe
- Morafe
- NATHI
- POC : Prophets Of Da City
- RJ Benjamin
- RUFF X
- Skomplazi
- Spykos
- Slice
- Vusi Nova
- Tuks
- Zola
- 37MPH aka Mpho Pholo (Music Producer/Artist)
- D Low
- Skeem
- Cream
- Ashaan
- Ghetto Luv
- O Da Meesta
- Boomaratcy
- DJs Revolution
- DJ Killa and DJ Murder
- DJ What What
- Mapaputsi
- Tandoor
- Ms Mash
- Kofifi
- Mavusana & Mizchif
- Jobe
- Jabu (The Weatherman)
- Jay ( Gospel)
- Notende
- Ntjapedi
- Pitch Black Afro (PBA)
- Dj Mthakathi
- Mzekezeke
- Brown Dash
- Unathi Nkayi ( Idols Judge)
- Jub Jub
- Shluda
- DJ Nkoh
- Keith Murray ( US Rapper)
- Puff Johnson ( US Artist)
- da L.E.S
- Cooke
- Maggz
- Ricky Rick
- Mzansi Strings
- Fly Chix
- Nancy G
- Veezo
- Wanda
- Dj Sneja
- Vusi Nova
- Chanel
- Moneoa
- ShoutOut
- Makizar
- Tarajika
- Young & Dirty
- Joelle Xo
- Nasrene
- Amanda Mankayi
- Bongani Radebe
- Ntando
- Mega Drum
- Sho Madjozi
- PS Djz
- Bekazela
- Dear Zwicky
- Dj Vitoto
- Skara Teka
- Hush-SA
- 047
- Onesimus
- Ntsika
- Ntando

== See also ==
- List of record labels
