= Zola, South Africa =

Zola
- Location within Gauteng Location within South Africa Location within Africa
- Coordinates: 26.240°S 27.838°E
- Country: South Africa
- Province: Gauteng
- Municipality: City of Johannesburg
- Main Place: Soweto

Area
  - Total: 3.91 km^{2} (1.51 sq mi)

Population (2011)
  - Total: 44,777
  - Density: 11,500/km^{2} (29,700/sq mi)

Racial makeup (2011)
  - Black African: 99.5%
  - Coloured: 0.1%
  - Indian/Asian: 0.1%
  - White: 0.0%
  - Other: 0.2%

First languages (2011)
  - Zulu: 76.3%
  - Xhosa: 7.6%
  - Sotho: 3.6%
  - English: 3.0%
  - Other: 9.4%
- Time zone: UTC+2 (SAST)
- Postal code (street): 1868
- PO box: 1878

Zola is a section of the Soweto township lying south of Johannesburg in Gauteng, South Africa. A number of well-known public figures, mostly musicians call Zola their home and were born and bred there.

Zola is in the west of Soweto and is also known as Mzambiya (Zambia) or Mashona (west side). It is surrounded by the townships of Tladi, Naledi, Dobsonville, Emndeni, Jabulani and Moletsane. The musicians Mongezi and his wife Margaret Singana stayed in Zola before they got a house in Jabulani (which is near Zola). Kwaito music musicians Mandoza and Zola were born in Zola. Brenda Fassie also lived in Zola in the early 1980s.

Zola is one of the most popular townships in Soweto and famous throughout South Africa for its notorious gangsters in the 1960s, 1970s and 1980s. Gangsters like 11 Boys in the 1960s, Maumaus in the 1970s, and Chivas and Big18s in the late 1980s/early 1990s. It is also popular tourist destination.

The famous historical schools from Zola are Zola Higher Primary School, Dr. Vilakazi and Lavela Secondary School. An upcoming school is Kwadedangendlale Senior Secondary School with good pass rates.
