= Dylan Valley =

South African filmmaker and musician

- Citizenship: South Africa
- Education: University of Cape Town
- Occupation: filmmaker

Dylan Valley is a South African filmmaker, born and raised in Cape Town. He has directed work with SABC, Al Jazeera, and independently. He teaches in the television studies department at Wits University.

== Early years and education ==
Valley grew up in Kuilsrivier and later in Durbanville, where he was the only Coloured child in the neighbourhood. He has cited these experiences as influential in shaping his interest in hip-hop, which became a key element of his creative work. He later incorporated aspects of hip-hop culture into his work in documentary filmmaking, which combines music, visual art, and performance to depict real-life subjects.

After graduating from Fairmont High School, Durbanville, he started to study Film and Media at the University of Cape Town and during this time, he did an internship at E-TV for 2 months. In 2005, as his final university project, he made a 10 minutes documentary about the history of the Cape Capoeira (Brazilian martial arts) scene. In 2006, he got his Honors degree in Film Theory and Practice from UCT and also produced a film, as his final thesis, called Lost Prophets with his co-producer and collaborator Sean Drummond, talking about Prophets of the city which shows the history of personal stories of South Africa's Hip Hop. The documentary was screened at various film festivals in South Africa.

== Career ==
In 2007 he worked at Plexus Films on the HEADWRAP team as a researcher and trainee director. And he got promoted to director straight away. Later, he was invited to direct some of the famous episodes from the series Headwrap including “Hip Hopera” and “Awareness thru Colours”. With Plexus Films, Valley developed a feature-length documentary, called Afrikaaps which explores the history of Afrikaans using Hip Hop, humour and personal perspective. The film, follows a group of local artists, creating the stage production, Afrikaaps, as they trace the true roots of Afrikaans to slaves in the cape. The documentary won Best South African Documentary at the Cape Winelands Film Festival. Valley was also nominated for Best documentary director at the 2012 South African Film and Television Awards for his work on Afrikaaps. In 2009, he was selected in The Mail and Guardian's list of 300 Young South Africans you have to take to lunch.

He has also directed two documentaries for Al Jazeera's Arabic documentary channel, on struggle icons Fatima Meer and Tatamkhulu Afrika.

Valley's last film was about a gang member who becomes a gospel rapper. The movie called “Incarcerated Knowledge” follows Peter John Christians' release from prison for murder, and tracks his progress on his way to become a hip hop artist.
