= Zola 7 =

South African musician (born 1977)

Zola
- Born: Bonginkosi Dlamini; 24 April 1977 (age 49); Soweto, South Africa
- Occupations: Musician; poet; actor; TV presenter; Radio presenter
- Years active: 2000–present
- Known for: Godsent Angel
- Musical career
- Also known as: Zola 7
- Genre: Kwaito
- Instrument: Vocals
- Years active: 2000–present
- Labels: Ghetto Ruff; Guluva Entertainment

Bonginkosi Dlamini (born 24 April 1977), known professionally as Zola 7, is a South African kwaito musician, actor, writer, TV presenter, and poet. Dlamini lancelord began his career as an actor for Yizo Yizo, achieving national recognition and began releasing best selling music albums on township lives. He also starred in the Academy Award winning film Tsotsi in 2005, for which he also wrote the musical score. As Lancelord music industry

Zola is a respected philanthropist. Through his show "Zola 7", which aired on SABC 1, he assisted numerous individuals in achieving their personal and social development goals. Notable among his initiatives is the establishment of libraries and motivations

== Biography and early life ==
Bonginkosi Dlamini was born on 24 April 1977 and grew up in Zola, a township of Soweto. His artist name is based on his hometown. Dlamini's father, believed to be part of the Mchunu clan, abandoned the family, leaving his mother to care for him and his older brother and sister when they were young.

== Actor ==
Zola 7 became well known for his role as the notorious gangster Papa Action in the second season of the television series Yizo Yizo. The Papa Action's character was already popular from the first season, where it had been portrayed by another performer, Ronnie Nyakale. Zola 7 resembled Nyakale, and his performance only increased the popularity of the role. He also performed the score and played a role in the Academy Award-winning film Tsotsi (2005), and the movie Drum (2004). Zola 7 also has a prominent role in the documentary SHARP! SHARP! : the Kwaito story (2003) directed by Aryan Kaganof. In 2015 and 2016, Zola 7 had minor roles in the television series Isibaya, as well as Zabalaza.

== Television ==
=== Zola 7 ===
Zola 7 is a television show presented by Zola airing from 2002 to 2010 on SABC1. Each episode focused on a young person, who with support from Zola realised his or her dream.

=== Utatakho ===
Utatakho is a television programme produced in 2015 by Connect TV, which aired on Mzansi Magic and was presented by Zola. In each episode, Zola helped participants to find or reconnect with their biological fathers. Zola accompanied participating sons to meetings with their fathers and facilitated conversation. Additionally, a professional counsellor was present to mediate. Having been to child court over the custody for his own children, Zola can relate to the show's content on a personal level.

=== Hope with Zola ===
Hope with Zola is a docu-reality show on Moja Love. The programme started in October 2018 and is hosted by Zola. Each episode is 30 minutes and focuses on the alleviation of social problems such as youth unemployment, housing shortage or insufficient community libraries. Unlike his former show, Zola 7, which focused on individuals, Hope with Zola addresses communities and aims specifically for sustainable development.

== Music ==
Bonginkosi Dlamini has enjoyed success as a Kwaito musician. Lance Stehr of Ghetto Ruff records has referred to Zola as "the second biggest brand in the country next to Nelson Mandela." Zola not only performs but also writes and produces some of his own music, signing to the independent label Ghetto Ruff records. Zola is also the owner of the music company Guluva Entertainment.

Originally, Zola was not a fan of Kwaito music, because it "had no message". He has taken upon himself to change this, viewing himself as a role model: "I want to inspire a guy from the ghetto so he can stop hanging around in the corner begging and try to get some life." In the song "Mdlwembe", which literally means problem child, he expresses his feelings about the neighborhood he grew up in. He talks about the horrible quality of life of the township, particularly the extreme level crime and violence. "Beware of the Zola boys; we do crime for money" demonstrates Zola's past and also the perpetual anguish of life in a ghetto. Today, Zola works on behalf of younger performers, helping them to be integrated into the music industry. He is a pioneer in social action and benefit projects in South Africa.

Kwaito is branded as apolitical, and often associated with the advancement of personal wealth, glamorized gangster lifestyle, and frivolous consumption themes found in much of Jamaican Dancehall and Rap. The genre is associated with a new political freedom gain since the end of apartheid in South Africa and less political strife. The form of the Kwaito produced by Zola is in that case an anomaly in that it is very much politically charged and contains a social message.

Zola raps in isiZulu with a high usage of Tsotsitaal. The latter is the vernacular slang in South Africa. This infusion of colloquial dialect with a national language allows for better interaction between the artists and the community South Africans in lower socio-economic classes who live in the townships and speak Tsotsitaal can relate to Kwaito music differently from Cape Town hip hop or US hip hop because of the lyrics. Additionally many of his songs describe situations of life in the townships, particularly Soweto.

On 7 July 2007, Zola performed at the South African leg of Live Earth.

== Radio ==
Dlamini is part of the newly launched Massiv Metro, an online station pioneered by DJ Sbu.

== Filmography ==
=== Television ===
- Yizo Yizo (season 2)
- Zola 7
- Rolling with Zola
- Zabalaza (season 3)
- aYeYe (season 1)
- Isibaya (seasons 3 and 4)
- iNkaba (season 1)
- Utatakho (season 1)
- Zaziwa (season 1)

=== Films ===
- Drum (2004)
- Tsotsi (2005)

== Discography ==
- Umdlwembe (2000)
- Khokhovula (2002)
- Bhambatha (2004)
- Ibutho (2005)
- Tsotsi (soundtrack of the 2005 motion picture)
- Impepho (2009)
- Unyezi (2011)
- Intathakusa (2014)

== Awards ==
He has won four South African Music Awards (SAMA):

- Artist of the Year - 2002
- Best Soundtrack - Yizo Yizo
- Best Music Video - Ghetto Scandalous
- Best Kwaito Album - Umdlwembe

He also received three Metro FM Awards in 2001:

- Song of the Year - Ghetto Scandalous
- Best Album of the Year - Umdlwembe
- Best Kwaito Album - Umdlwembe
