= Afrikaaps (film) =

- Directed by: Dylan Valley
- Screenplay by: Dylan Valley; Khalid Shamis
- Produced by: Plexus Films
- Cinematography: Dylan Valley
- Edited by: Khalid Shamis
- Release date: 2010
- Running time: 52 minutes
- Country: South Africa

Afrikaaps is a South African 2010 documentary film.

== Synopsis ==
This documentary focuses on a theatre piece entitled Afrikaaps within a film. It is based on the creative processes and performances of the stage production. Using hip-hop the film and the stage play attempt to reclaim Afrikaans – so long considered a language of the oppressor – as a language of liberation. Present from the beginning of the project, Dylan Valley captures revealing moments of the cast's and production crew's personal narratives that transcend what happens on stage.

== Awards ==
- Encounters International Documentary Festival, South Africa, 2010
