= You (South African magazine) =

South African family magazine

YOU
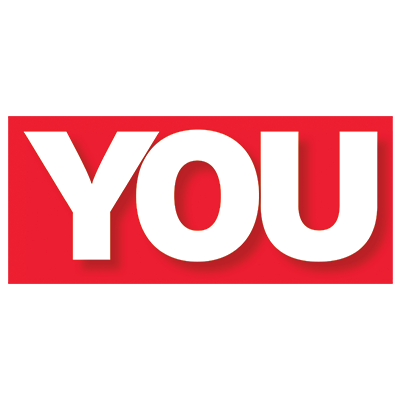
- Categories: Celebrity, human interest, news
- Frequency: Weekly
- Founded: 1987; 39 years ago
- Company: Media24 (Naspers)
- Country: South Africa
- Based in: Cape Town
- Language: English
- Website: www.you.co.za

YOU is a South African family magazine that is aimed at demographically diverse South African English-speaking readers of different ethnicities with coverage on current events and "interesting people".

== History and profile ==
The YOU magazine was launched in 1987 by Nasionale Pers, which later became Media24. YOU was aimed at English-speaking South Africans. The magazine is published in Cape Town by Media24, the print division of Naspers. The magazine is published on a weekly basis. It has two sister magazines: Huisgenoot (aimed at White and Coloured Afrikaans-speaking readers) and Drum (aimed at Black English, Sotho and Zulu-speaking readers).
