= Makhadzi discography =

Makhadzi, a South African singer and songwriter, has released seven studio albums and one extended play (EP).

Her second album, Matorokisi, was released on 1 November 2019 and debuted at number two on the South African music charts. Her third studio album, Kokovha, was released on October 16, 2020. It debuted at number one in South Africa and was certified double platinum.

Her fourth studio album, African Queen, was released on 3 September 2021 and was certified Gold. The album's lead single, Ghanama, featuring Prince Benza and King Monada, was certified double platinum in South Africa.

== Albums ==
=== Studio albums ===
List of studio albums, with selected chart positions and certifications
Title	Album details	Peak chart positions	Certifications
Title	Album details	SA	Certifications
Shumela Venda	Released: 2 November 2017; Label: Formats: CD, digital download	—	
Matorokisi	Released: 1 November 2019; Label: Formats: CD, digital download, streaming	2	
Kokovha	Released: 16 October 2020; Label: Open Mic; Formats: Digital download, streaming	—	RISA: 2× Platinum
African Queen	Released: 3 September 2021; Label: Open Mic; Formats: Streaming, digital download	—	RISA: Gold
African Queen 2.0	Released: 18 November 2022; Label: Open Mic; Formats: Streaming, digital download	—	
Mbofholowo	Released: 22 September 2023; Label: Makhadzi Entertainment; Formats: Streaming, digital download	1	RISA: Platinum
Miracle Child	Released: 4 October 2024; Label: Makhadzi Entertainment; Formats: Streaming, digital download	—	

== EPs ==
List of EPs, with selected details
Title	EP details	Certification
Pain Ya Jealous	Released: 1 April 2022; Label: Open Mic; Formats: Streaming, digital download	RISA: Gold

== Singles ==
=== As lead artist ===
List of singles as lead artist, with selected chart positions and certifications, showing year released and album name
Title	Year	Peak chart positions	Certifications	Album
Title	Year	SA	Certifications	Album
"Matorokisi" (featuring DJ Call Me)	2019	—		Matorokisi
"Tshikwama" (featuring Master KG)	2019	—		Matorokisi
"Red Card"	2021	—	RISA: Platinum	Kokovha
"Tchukutsha" (featuring Lady Du)	2021	—		African Queen
"Mjolo" (featuring Mlindo the Vocalist)	2021	—	RISA: 2× Platinum	African Queen
"Ghanama" (featuring Prince Benza)	2021	—	RISA: 2× Platinum	African Queen
"Connection" (featuring Kabza De Small)	2021	—	RISA: Gold	African Queen
"Makhwapheni" (featuring Mr Bow)	2021	—	RISA: Gold	African Queen
"Ma Yellow Bone" (featuring Prince Benza)	2021	—	RISA: Platinum	African Queen
"Beke Le Beke" Vee Mampeezy	2021	—	RISA: Gold	African Queen
"Gidimani" (featuring Cassper Nyovest and Mr Brown)	2021	—	RISA: Platinum	African Queen
"Salungano" (featuring Kabza De Small)	2021	—	RISA: Platinum	African Queen
"Kolongonya"	2021	—	RISA: Gold	African Queen
"Zwivhuya" (featuring Jon Deliger)	2021	—	RISA: Platinum	African Queen
"MaGear" (featuring Mr Brown, Master Hazard)	2022	—		Non-album singles
"Letswai" (featuring Ba Bethe Gashaozen)	2024	—	RISA: Gold	Non-album single
"Number 1" (featuring Iyanya, Prince Benza)	2024	1	RISA: 2× Platinum	Miracle Child
"Jealous Down" (featuring Dr Skaro)	2024	—		Miracle Child
"Bafana" (featuring Ba Bethe Gashoazen)	2024	—		Miracle Child
"We are One"	2024	—		Miracle Child
"Operations" (Makhadzi featuring Mr Brown, TS Man)	2026	—		Non-album single
"—" denotes a recording that did not chart or was not released in that territory.
