= Kokovha =

Studio album by Makhadzi
- Released: 16 October 2020
- Length: 60:37
- Label: Open Mic
- Producer: Bongani Shabangu; Jan Maluleke; Calvin Thaba; Lyonel Siwela; Sindiswa Shobede; Oleile Sedumedi

Makhadzi chronology
Matorokisi (2019)	Kokovha (2020)	African Queen (2020)

Kokovha is the album by South African singer-songwriter Makhadzi, released on 16 October 2020 through Open Mic.

The album was certified Gold in South Africa.

== Commercial performance ==
Kokovha was commercial successful and named the most streamed female album by Apple Music in South Africa.

== Track listing ==
Kokovha track listing
No.	Title	Writer(s)	Producer(s)	Length
1.	"Sugar Sugar" (featuring Mapintsha)	Mapintsha, Ndivhudzannyi Ralivhona	Khoisan Maxy, DJ Ck, DJ Janisto	4:15
2.	"Happiness" (featuring Mr Brown)	Ralivhona, Mr Brown	Mr Brown, DJ Ck, Prince Benza, Sindiswa Shobede, DJ Janisto	5:07
3.	"Moya Uri Yes" (featuring Prince Benza)	Ralivhona, Benza		5:27
4.	"Red Card"	Ralivhona	DJ Ck, DJ Janisto, Mr Brown	4:12
5.	"Murahu" (featuring Mr Brown)	Ralivhona, Janisto, CK, Brown	Janisto, CK, Brown	4:05
6.	"My Love" (featuring Master KG, Prince Benza)	Ralivhona, Master, Benza	CK, Janisto	4:53
7.	"Madhakutswa" (featurimg Gigi Lamayne, Jah Prayzah)	Ralivhona, Genesis Gabriella Tina Manney, Jah Prayzah	Janisto, CK, Brown	4:09
8.	"Battery" (featuring Sho Madjozi)	Ralivhona, Maya Christinah Xichavo Wegerif	Janisto, CK, Brown	4:06
9.	"Kokovha" (featuring Jah Prayzah)	Ralivhona, Jah Prayzah	DJ Call Me	5:57
10.	"Fhumulani" (featuring Team Mosha)	Ralivhona, Team Mosha		3:52
11.	"Amadoda" (featuring Moonchild Sanelly)	Ralivhona, Calvin Thaba, Anelisiwe Twisha	Calvin Thaba	5:56
12.	"Lokololwa"	Ralivhona		4:14
13.	"Gagalanga" (featuring Prince Benza, Team Mosha)	Ralivhona, Prince Benza, Team Mosha		5:20
14.	"Rema" (featuring DJ Call Me, Mizo Phyll)	Ralivhona, DJ Call Me, Mizo Phyll	DJ Call Me	4:31
15.	"I Believe" (featuring Mr Brown)	Ralivhona, Mr Brown	Brown	3:55
16.	"Themba Mutu" (featuring Charma Gal)	Ralivhona, Magdeline Lesolobe		4:18
17.	"Tshikiri Poto"	Ralivhona		4:54
18.	"Nwana Asi Wanga"	Ralivhona		4:51
19.	"Maswina"	Ralivhona		4:26
20.	"DJ" (featuring Mayten)	Ralivhona, Mayten		3:41
21.	"Mahalwan" (featuring Mayten)	Ralivhona, Mayten		5:00
Total length:				60:37

== Personnel ==
Adapted from AllMusic.

- Bongani Shabangu – composer, producer
- Calvin Thaba – composer, producer
- Charma Gal – vocals
- DJ Call Me – vocals
- FB – vocals
- Gigi Lamayne – vocals
- Jah Prayzah – vocals
- Jan Maluleke – composer, producer
- Lyonel Siwela – composer, producer
- Makhadzi – vocals
- Mampintsha – vocals
- Master KG – vocals
- Mayten – vocals
- Mizo Phyll – vocals
- Moonchild Sanelly – vocals
- Mr Brown – vocals
- Oleile Sedumedi – composer, producer
- Prince Benza – vocals
- Sho Madjozi – vocals
- Sindiswa Shobede – composer, producer
- Team Mosha – vocals

== Certifications ==
Certifications for Kokovha
Region	Certification	Certified units/sales
South Africa (RISA)	Gold	10,000^{‡}
^{‡} Sales+streaming figures based on certification alone.

== Release history ==
Release dates and formats for Kokovha
Region	Date	Format(s)	Label
South Africa	16 October 2020	Digital download; streaming	Open Mic
