= List of Ultratop 50 number-one singles of 2020 =

These hits topped the Ultratop 50 in 2020.

Flanders
Issue date	Song	Artist
4 January	"Dance Monkey"	Tones and I
11 January	"Dance Monkey"	Tones and I
18 January	"Dance Monkey"	Tones and I
25 January	"Blinding Lights"	The Weeknd
1 February	"Blinding Lights"	The Weeknd
8 February	"Blinding Lights"	The Weeknd
15 February	"Blinding Lights"	The Weeknd
22 February	"Blinding Lights"	The Weeknd
29 February	"Blinding Lights"	The Weeknd
7 March	"Blinding Lights"	The Weeknd
14 March	"Blinding Lights"	The Weeknd
21 March	"Blinding Lights"	The Weeknd
28 March	"Blinding Lights"	The Weeknd
4 April	"Blinding Lights"	The Weeknd
11 April	"Blinding Lights"	The Weeknd
18 April	"Blinding Lights"	The Weeknd
25 April	"Blinding Lights"	The Weeknd
2 May	"Kom wat dichterbij"	Regi featuring Jake Reese and OT
9 May	"Kom wat dichterbij"	Regi featuring Jake Reese and OT
16 May	"Blinding Lights"	The Weeknd
23 May	"Kom wat dichterbij"	Regi Penxten featuring Jake Reese and OT
30 May	"Blinding Lights"	The Weeknd
6 June	"Blinding Lights"	The Weeknd
13 June	"Kom wat dichterbij"	Regi Penxten featuring Jake Reese and OT
20 June	"Kom wat dichterbij"	Regi Penxten featuring Jake Reese and OT
27 June	"Kom wat dichterbij"	Regi Penxten featuring Jake Reese and OT
4 July	"Kom wat dichterbij"	Regi Penxten featuring Jake Reese and OT
11 July	"Kom wat dichterbij"	Regi Penxten featuring Jake Reese and OT
18 July	"Kom wat dichterbij"	Regi Penxten featuring Jake Reese and OT
25 July	"Savage Love (Laxed – Siren Beat)"	Jawsh 685 and Jason Derulo
1 August	"Savage Love (Laxed – Siren Beat)"	Jawsh 685 and Jason Derulo
8 August	"Savage Love (Laxed – Siren Beat)"	Jawsh 685 and Jason Derulo
15 August	"Savage Love (Laxed – Siren Beat)"	Jawsh 685 and Jason Derulo
22 August	"Jerusalema (Remix)"	Master KG featuring Burna Boy and Nomcebo Zikode
29 August	"Jerusalema (Remix)"	Master KG featuring Burna Boy and Nomcebo Zikode
5 September	"Jerusalema (Remix)"	Master KG featuring Burna Boy and Nomcebo Zikode
12 September	"Jerusalema (Remix)"	Master KG featuring Burna Boy and Nomcebo Zikode
19 September	"Jerusalema (Remix)"	Master KG featuring Burna Boy and Nomcebo Zikode
26 September	"Jerusalema (Remix)"	Master KG featuring Burna Boy and Nomcebo Zikode
3 October	"Jerusalema (Remix)"	Master KG featuring Burna Boy and Nomcebo Zikode
10 October	"Jerusalema (Remix)"	Master KG featuring Burna Boy and Nomcebo Zikode
17 October	"Jerusalema (Remix)"	Master KG featuring Burna Boy and Nomcebo Zikode
24 October	"Jerusalema (Remix)"	Master KG featuring Burna Boy and Nomcebo Zikode
31 October	"Head & Heart"	Joel Corry featuring MNEK
7 November	"Head & Heart"	Joel Corry featuring MNEK
14 November	"Fever"	Dua Lipa and Angèle
21 November	"Fever"	Dua Lipa and Angèle
28 November	"Head & Heart"	Joel Corry featuring MNEK
5 December	"Fever"	Dua Lipa and Angèle
12 December	"Fever"	Dua Lipa and Angèle
19 December	"Fever"	Dua Lipa and Angèle
26 December	"Fever"	Dua Lipa and Angèle

Wallonia
Issue date	Song	Artist
4 January	"Dance Monkey"	Tones and I
11 January	"Dance Monkey"	Tones and I
18 January	"Dance Monkey"	Tones and I
25 January	"Dance Monkey"	Tones and I
1 February	"Blinding Lights"	The Weeknd
8 February	"Blinding Lights"	The Weeknd
15 February	"Blinding Lights"	The Weeknd
22 February	"Blinding Lights"	The Weeknd
29 February	"Blinding Lights"	The Weeknd
7 March	"Blinding Lights"	The Weeknd
14 March	"Blinding Lights"	The Weeknd
21 March	"Lettre à une femme"	Ninho
28 March	"Blinding Lights"	The Weeknd
4 April	"Blinding Lights"	The Weeknd
11 April	"Blinding Lights"	The Weeknd
18 April	"Blinding Lights"	The Weeknd
25 April	"Blinding Lights"	The Weeknd
2 May	"Roses (Imanbek Remix)"	Saint Jhn
9 May	"Roses (Imanbek Remix)"	Saint Jhn
16 May	"Roses (Imanbek Remix)"	Saint Jhn
23 May	"Some Say"	Nea
30 May	"Some Say"	Nea
6 June	"Breaking Me"	Topic featuring A7S
13 June	"Breaking Me"	Topic featuring A7S
20 June	"Djomb"	Bosh
27 June	"Djomb"	Bosh
4 July	"Djomb"	Bosh
11 July	"In Your Eyes"	The Weeknd
18 July	"In Your Eyes"	The Weeknd
25 July	"In Your Eyes"	The Weeknd
1 August	"In Your Eyes"	The Weeknd
8 August	"In Your Eyes"	The Weeknd
15 August	"Mamacita"	Black Eyed Peas, Ozuna and J Rey Soul
22 August	"Jerusalema (Remix)"	Master KG featuring Burna Boy and Nomcebo Zikode
29 August	"Jerusalema (Remix)"	Master KG featuring Burna Boy and Nomcebo Zikode
5 September	"Jerusalema (Remix)"	Master KG featuring Burna Boy and Nomcebo Zikode
12 September	"Jerusalema (Remix)"	Master KG featuring Burna Boy and Nomcebo Zikode
19 September	"Jerusalema (Remix)"	Master KG featuring Burna Boy and Nomcebo Zikode
26 September	"BXL Zoo"	Damso featuring Hamza
3 October	"Jerusalema (Remix)"	Master KG featuring Burna Boy and Nomcebo Zikode
10 October	"Jerusalema (Remix)"	Master KG featuring Burna Boy and Nomcebo Zikode
17 October	"Jerusalema (Remix)"	Master KG featuring Burna Boy and Nomcebo Zikode
24 October	"Jerusalema (Remix)"	Master KG featuring Burna Boy and Nomcebo Zikode
31 October	"Jerusalema (Remix)"	Master KG featuring Burna Boy and Nomcebo Zikode
7 November	"Fever"	Dua Lipa and Angèle
14 November	"Fever"	Dua Lipa and Angèle
21 November	"Fever"	Dua Lipa and Angèle
28 November	"Fever"	Dua Lipa and Angèle
5 December	"Fever"	Dua Lipa and Angèle
12 December	"Fever"	Dua Lipa and Angèle
19 December	"Fever"	Dua Lipa and Angèle
26 December	"Fever"	Dua Lipa and Angèle

Flanders ranking of most weeks at number 1
Position	Artist	Weeks #1
1	The Weeknd	17
2	Master KG	10
2	Burna Boy	10
2	Nomcebo Zikode	10
3	Regi	9
3	Jake Reese	9
3	OT	9
4	Dua Lipa	6
4	Angèle	6
5	Jawsh 685	4
5	Jason Derulo	4
6	Tones and I	3
6	Joel Corry	3
6	MNEK	3

Wallonia ranking of most weeks at number 1
Position	Artist	Weeks #1
1	The Weeknd	17
2	Master KG	10
2	Burna Boy	10
2	Nomcebo Zikode	10
3	Dua Lipa	8
3	Angèle	8
4	Tones and I	4
5	Saint Jhn	3
5	Bosh	3
6	Nea	2
6	Topic	2
6	A7S	2
7	Ninho	1
7	Black Eyed Peas	1
7	Ozuna	1
7	J Rey Soul	1
7	Damso	1
7	Hamza	1

== See also ==
- List of number-one albums of 2020 (Belgium)
- 2020 in music
