= Solyd the Plug =

Zimbabwean DJ and record producer

Soyld The Plug
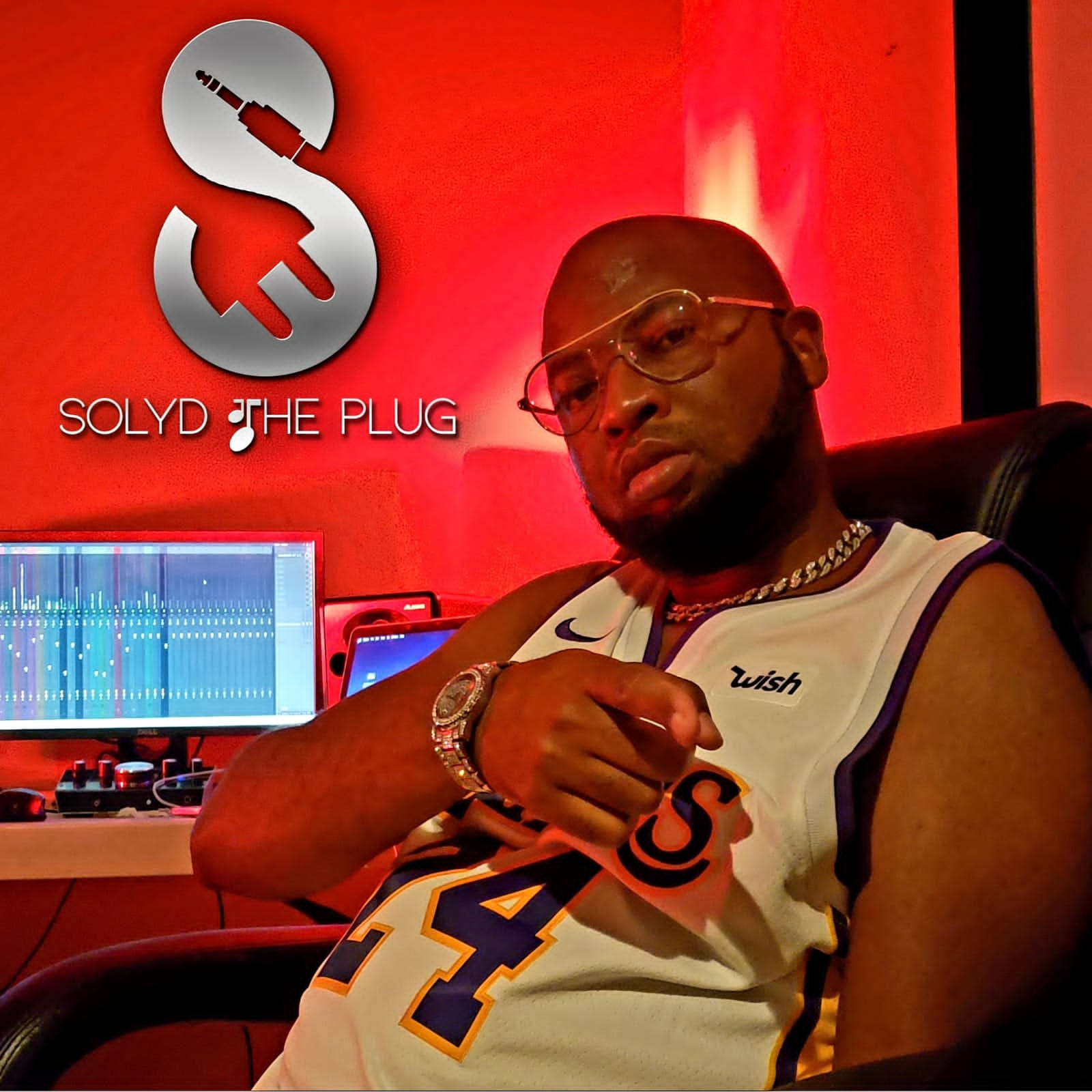
- Zimbabwean Music Producer
- Born: Martin Chikomba; 19 August 1983 (age 42)
- Occupations: DJ; record producer; music business consultant
- Musical career
- Genres: Amapiano; House
- Labels: Mashroom Media, OAK Media Group
- Website: oakmediag.com

Martin Chikomba (born August 19, 1983) who goes by the stage name Solyd The Plug, is a Zimbabwean-American businessman, record producer and Amapiano artist. He is the founder of Oak Media Group, which is a record label. He is one of the co-founders of Mashroom Media. Solyd The Plug is well known for his single Bella Ciao which is a remix of the popular song off the Netflix series Money Heist.

== Early life ==
Despite being born in Zimbabwe, Solyd the Plug spent most of his childhood in South Africa. He is based in Canada, after moving from Texas in the United States of America.

== Early career ==
In 2006, Solyd the Plug who was an events manager at Brass Monkey Night Club in Bulawayo started DJaying. At the time, Brass Monkey was regarded as one of the premier and exclusive night spots in the city, which catered to huge audiences because of it was large.

In 2007, he moved to South Africa where he doubled as a club DJ and music promoter. He also featured on Channel O, MTV, and TRACE events as well as at the Durban July.

Solyd the Plug and his business partner, Themba Davids, founded music publishing company Oak Media Group in 2010. The company is based in South Africa and the United States. Oak Media Group has distributed over 800 music videos to music channels such as Trace TV, Channel O and MTV.

== Mashroom Media ==
In 2016, Solyd The Plug entered into a partnership with Zimbabwean musician ExQ and music producer DJ Tamuka and launched recording studio Mashroom Media. Mashroom Media signed a number of upcoming talented Zimbabwean artists who include Nutty O, Novi Keys, Shamisozw, Yoca and Spits Loui. In 2020, Mashroom Media underwent a transformation and was relaunched with a new recording studio. Following the disbanding of Jah Prayzah's Military Touch Movement , Jah Prayzah endorsed the studio, saying that he was looking forward to recording his first song at Mashroom Media.

== Musical career ==
His first single Bella Ciao was released in April 2020. It is a remix of the theme song of the television series Money Heist. Solyd's remix is done in South Africa's Amapiano style. The song had over 2 million streams across different platforms.

His second single Press Play was released in June 2020 and featured South African music producer Tboy Daflame, famous for producing Sho Madjozi's hit song John Cena. In July 2020, Solyd released his third single August. He followed this up with another single Surrender in August. On Surrender, Solyd the Plug worked with Tboy Daflame again. His fifth single, Pirates of Mzansi was released in August.

== Discography ==
=== List of Albums ===
Albums Title	Albums Details
North Yanos	Released: 27 January 2022; Distributed by: Ditto Music (UK); Record Label: Solyd Factory/ Mashroom Media; Published by: OAK Media Group (SA)

=== List of singles ===
Single Title	Single Details
Bella Ciao	Released: 30 April 2020; Label: Mashroom Media; Artists: Solyd The Plug
Press Play	Released: 22 June 2020; Label: Mashroom Media; Artists: Solyd The Plug featuring Tboy Daflame
August	Released: 13 July 2020; Label: Mashroom Media; Artists: Solyd The Plug
Surrender	Released: 10 August 2020; Label: Mashroom Media; Artists: Solyd The Plug Featuring Tboy Daflame
Pirates of Mzansi	Released: 17 August 2020; Label: Mashroom Media; Artists: Solyd The Plug and DJ PressureZw
Gold Digger	Released: 5 October 2020; Label: Mashroom Media; Artists: Solyd The Plug
Moove II	Released: 13 October 2020; Artists: Mufaro & DJ Terry Moyaz feat. Solyd The Plug
Surrender (Amapiano Remix)	Released: 2 November 2020; Label: Mashroom Media; Artists: Solyd The Plug and Tboy Daflame
Someone You Loved (Amapian Remix)	Released: 20 November 2020; Label: Mashroom Media; Artists: Solyd The Plug and SAVO
Shampopo	Released: 23 November 2020; Label: Mashroom Media; Artists: Solyd The Plug
Jungle Dance 2	Released: 20 December 2020; Label: Mashroom Media; Artists: Solyd The Plug and DJ Pressure ZW

== Nomination For Best Song ==
In February 2021, Solyd The Plug's song Bella Ciao was named as one of the five nominees for the Best Song By A Zimbabwean In The Diaspora award in the Star FM Listeners Choice Awards 2021.

The full nominees were:

- Solyd The Plug - Bella Ciao
- Noxi Guni - My Melody
- Charlie Kay - Kumusha
- Valee Music - Watora Moyo
- Shasha - Send It Back

== Promoting Upcoming Artists On Debut Album ==
Solyd The Plug featured a host of undiscovered talent on his debut album North Yanos. The album featured upcoming artists from Bulawayo, USA, UK and Nigeria. It was part of Solyd's efforts to give upcoming talented artists the platform to launch their careers.

Solyd also partnered with a studio in the City of Kings (Bulawayo) which is run by Dj Prince Eskhosini, where they will be mentoring and assisting young artists.

Below are the upcoming artists who featured on the album as well as the tracks they featured on.

- North Amapiano Intro featuring DJ Swing, Alfred Kainga and Miss Kumbie;
- Vibe featuring Toxic Chemical, DJ Naida and Reverb 7;
- Lets Go featuring DJ Khumz, Boocy and Fish;
- Yizo Lezinto featuring Moxican and 5iver;
- Utshwala (2022 Edition) featuring DJ Prince Eskhosini and Stinah;
- Key to My Heart featuring Toxic Chemical and Halao Wu.

== B4 You Crumble Music Business Series ==
Solyd The Plug also ran a weekly series on how the music business works titled B4 You Crumble. The series was hosted by Star FM radio personality and Tamy Moyo's manager RK The Music Doctor
