= SAARF =

SAARF may refer to:

- Special Allied Airborne Reconnaissance Force
- South African Audience Research Foundation, a non-profit organization which publishes media audience and product/brand research.
