= Nomcebo Zikode =

South African singer and songwriter

- Born: Nomcebo Nothule Zikode; 28 October 1985 (age 40); Hammarsdale, KwaZulu-Natal, South Africa
- Origin: Johannesburg
- Genres: House; Afro house
- Occupation: Singer-songwriter
- Instrument: vocals
- Years active: 2005–present
- Labels: Ganyani Entertainment (former); Open Mic Productions (former); Sony

Nomcebo Nothule Zikode (born 28 October 1985) is a South African singer and songwriter.

Born in Hammarsdale, Zikode was a backing singer for several years. She collaborated with DJ Ganyani on their hit single "Emazulwini" (2018). Having signed a record deal with Open Mic Production, she co-wrote and was featured on Master KG's chart-topping single "Jerusalema" (2019), which debuted number 1 on Billboard charts and Apple Music charts.

Her debut album Xola Moya Wam was released in 2020, containing two successful singles, "Xola Moya Wam" and "Bayabuza".

== Life and career ==
=== Early life and education ===
Zikode was born in Hammarsdale, Province of Natal. She matriculated at Ukusa High School, later enrolling at Havatech College, obtaining an information technology degree.

=== Career beginnings ===
After moving from home to pursue a career in music, she worked mostly as a backing singer for more than fifteen years. She worked with South African artistes, including Deborah Fraser, Zahara, Lundi Tyamara, and Nhlanhla Nciza.

She was signed by Ganyani Entertainment, providing vocals for songs including "NTO", "Jabulile", and "Emazulwini", which received a nomination for Record of the Year at the SAMA awards. As she did not own the songs, she was not permitted to perform them without the consent of the label.

Having signed record deal with Open Mic Productions, she gained worldwide popularity after working with Master KG on his 2019 hit single "Jerusalema" and later remixed by Burna Boy, debuted #1 on Billboard Music charts.

=== 2020-present:Xola Moya Wam ===
On 14 August 2020, her single "Xola Moya Wam" featuring Master KG was released as album's lead single. The song was certified gold certification by Recording Industry of South Africa in the first 2 weeks. The single peaked number 1 on Apple Music Chart & iTunes Chart. In early August, album pre-order were made available.

Her debut studio album Xola Moya Wam was released on 21 August 2020. It features Master KG, Makhadzi and Bongo Beats. The album was certified platinum after a month of its release with sales of 150 000 copies.

In 2020, Zikode signed a global record deal with Sony/ATV Music.

On 3 December 2020, she won at the 1st KZN Entertainment Awards of KZN Entertainment Awards for Best Female Artist category.

At the 27th South African Music Awards, Xola Moya Wam was nominated as Best Dance Album.

On 29 July 2021, she went on European tour. In late 2021, she made her debut on screens as guest appearance on Love and Hip Hop franchise.

== Controversy ==
On 11 July 2021, Zikode claimed that she was not paid for her feature on "Jerusalema" by her label Open Mic Productions.

== Endorsement ==
In 2021, Zikode was named a Good Ambassador for AIDONIC.

== Tours ==
=== Headlining ===
- European Tour (2021)

== Discography ==
=== Studio albums ===
- Xola Moya Wam (2020)

=== Singles featured in ===
Title	Year	Peak chart positions										Certifications	Album
Title	Year	SA	AUT	BEL (FL)	BEL (WA)	FRA	GER	NL	SWE	SWI	UK	Certifications	Album
Emazulwini (DJ Ganyani featuring Zikode)	2019	43	—	—	—	—	123	—	—	—	—		Ganyani’s House Grooves 10
"Jerusalema" (Master KG featuring Zikode)	2020	1	2	1	1	2	3	2	31	1	55	BEA: 2× Platinum; BPI: Gold; SNEP: Diamond	Jerusalema
"Ishephisi Ejezini" (Mthandeni SK featuring Nomcebo Zikode)	2024	10	—	—	—	—	—	—	—	—	—		Non-album single
"—" denotes a recording that did not chart or was not released.

Others

- "Jerusalema" (remix) - (Master KG feat. Burna Boy & Nomcebo Zikode) (2020)
- "Jerusalema" (remix) - Master KG feat. Micro TDH & Greeicy & Nomcebo Zikode (2020)

== Personal life ==
Zikode is married to Selwyn Fraser and has two children.

== Awards and nominations ==
Year	Awards	Category	Results	Ref.
2020	1st KZNEA	Best female artist	Won	
2021	27th SAMAs	Best Female Artist	Nominated	
2021	27th SAMAs	Best dance Album	Nominated	
2021	27th SAMAs	Record of the Year	Nominated	
2021	Net Honours	Most Played Alternative Song - "Jerusalema (Remix)" (Master KG featuring Nomcebo Zikode & Burna Boy)	Nominated	
2021	All Africa Music Awards	Best Female Artist in South Africa	Pending	
2021	All Africa Music Awards	African Fans' Favourite	Pending	
2022	Grammy Awards	Best Global Performance	Won	
2023	Forbes Woman Africa Awards	Top Entertainer	Won	
2023	SAMA	International Achievement	Won	
2024	Basadi in Music Awards	Artist of the Year	Nominated	
