= Mbofholowo =

Studio album by Makhadzi
- Released: 22 September 2023
- Length: 60:38
- Label: Makhadzi Entertainment

Makhadzi chronology
African Queen 2.0 (2022)	Mbofholowo (2023)

Mbofholowo is a studio album by South African singer-songwriter Makhadzi, released on 22 September 2023 through Makhadzi Entertainment.

== Track listing ==
Mbofholowo track listing
No.	Title	Length
1.	"Makhadzi (Intro)"	4:48
2.	"Marotho" (featuring Kabza De Small, MaWhoo, Azana and Sino Msolo)	7:06
3.	"Twelve O'clock"	4:48
4.	"Movie" (featuring Ntate Stunna, Fortunator and DJ Gun Do SA)	4:50
5.	"Mushonga" (featuring Dalom Kids, Ntate Stunna, Lwah Ndlunkulu and Master KG)	4:40
6.	"Rea Lwa"	4:41
7.	"Tshakhuma"	4:37
8.	"Malala Phoo" (featuring Fortunator)	4:17
9.	"Wagana Nna" (featuring 2Point1, Gusba Banana and Prince Benza)	4:48
10.	"Siyayenza"	4:48
11.	"Hodalesa"	4:19
12.	"Mapara"	4:48
13.	"Ndowela"	4:23
14.	"Makhwapheni"	4:48
15.	"Johnny"	4:48
16.	"Tshiwana"	4:48
17.	"Ipase Moto (Malawi)"	4:48
18.	"Wedding Day" (featuring Mr Bow)	4:48
19.	"Matodzi"	4:48
20.	"Shampopo/Mapara" (featuring Alick Macheso and Mr Brown)	4:48
Total length:		60:38

== Personnel ==
Credits for Mbofholowo are adapted from AllMusic.

- 2point1 – producer, vocals
- Alick Macheso – vocals
- Ati – vocals
- Azana – vocals
- Ba Bethe Gashoazen – composer, vocals, producer
- Dalom Kids – vocals
- DJ Call Me – vocals
- DJ Gun Do SA – vocals
- Fortunator – vocals
- Gusba Banana – vocals
- Kabelo Motha – composer, producer
- Kabza De Small – vocals
- Kharishma – vocals
- Lioness Ratang – vocals
- Lowsheen – vocals
- Lwah Ndlunkulu – vocals
- Makhadzi – composer, primary artist, vocals
- Makhosazana Masango – composer
- Master Kg – producer, vocals
- Mawhoo – vocals
- Mr Brown – vocals
- Naqua SA – vocals
- Ndivhudzannyi Ralivhona – composer
- Nokwazi – vocals
- Ntate Stunna – vocals
- Prince Benza – producer, vocals
- Ramzeey – vocals
- Sino Msolo – vocals
- Sinoyolo Msolo – composer
- Thandeka Ngema – composer

== Accolades ==
=== Industry Awards ===
Mbofholowo received a nomination for Best Traditional Music Album at the 30th ceremony of South African Music Awards.

Awards and nominations for Mbofholowo
Organization	Year	Category	Result	Ref.
South African Music Awards	2024	Best Traditional Music Album	Pending	

== Certification and sales ==
Certifications and sales for Mbofholowo
Region	Certification	Certified units/sales
South Africa (RISA)	Platinum	50,000^{‡}
^{‡} Sales+streaming figures based on certification alone.

== Release history ==
Release dates and formats for Mbofholowo
Region	Date	Format(s)	Label	Ref.
Various	22 September 2023	Digital download; streaming	Makhadzi Entertainment	
