= Calais (disambiguation) =

Calais is a city in France.

Calais may also refer to:

== Places ==
- Calais, Maine, United States, a city
- Calais, Vermont, United States, a town
- Arrondissement of Calais, France
- Calais (Parliament of England constituency), represented before the French reconquest in the 16th century
- Calais, Alberta, Canada, an unincorporated community
- Calais, Limpopo, South Africa, a village
- Mount Calais, Alexander Island, Antarctica
- A crater on Saturn's moon Phoebe (moon)

== Automobiles ==
- Cadillac Calais
- Oldsmobile Cutlass Calais
- Holden Calais

== Given name ==
- Calaïs, one of the Boreads in Greek mythology
- Saint Calais (died 541), French hermit-saint, namesake of the commune of Saint-Calais
- Calais Campbell (born 1986), American National Football League player

== Other uses ==
- Calais (beetle), a genus of click beetles
- Calais (Reuters product), an internet toolkit
- Calais RUFC, a former French football club
- Calais Railroad, Maine

== See also ==
- Callaïs – Precious stones used in ancient beadmaking
- Louisiana v. Callais – 2026 U.S. Supreme Court case
