= 1st KZN Entertainment Awards =

2020 South African entertainment awards

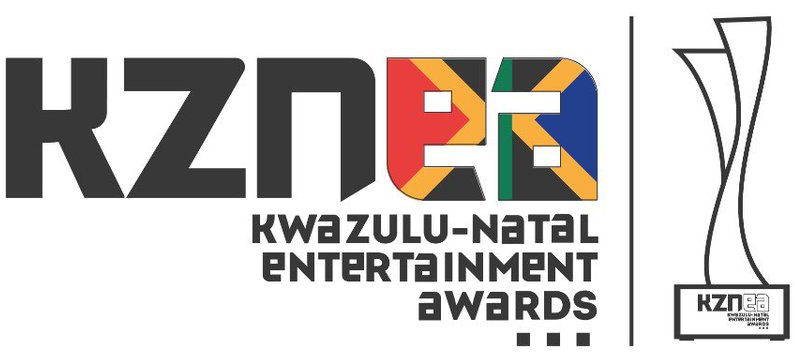
- Official poster
- Date: December 15, 2020
- Venue: Durban ICC
- Country: South Africa
- Presented by: Somizi Mhlongo; Pearl Thusi

Television/radio coverage
- Network: BET Africa
- Related: Metro FM Awards

The 1st KZN Entertainment Awards were held at Durban ICC, KwaZulu-Natal, South Africa on December 15, 2020, were hosted by Somizi Mhlongo and Pearl Thusi, aired live on BET Africa.

== Winners and nominees ==
Below list is nominees and winners. Winners are listed first, highlighted in boldface, and indicated with a double dagger (‡).

**Best Female Artist**: **Nomcebo Zikode** ‡; Ci Ci; Kelly Khumalo; Holly Rey; Babes Wodumo; Shekinah; Zandie Khumalo; Zanda Zakuza	**Best Male Artist**: **Sjava** ‡; Zakwe; Tellaman; Mlindo The Vocalist; Nasty C; Khuzani; Riky Rick
**Best Actress**: **Dawn Thandeka King** ‡; Nomzamo Mbatha; Leleti Khumalo; Ayanda Borotho; Thuso Mbedu; Thembi Mtshali-Jones; Gugu Gumede	**Best Club DJ Male**: **Dlala Thukzin** ‡; Sun-El Musician; DJ Sox; DJ Bongs; Andy X; DJ Lag; DJ Spectacular; Culoe De Song
**Newest Find**: **Sithelo The DJ** ‡; Sbahle; Qwabe Twins; Blaq Diamond; TNS; Nondumiso Jozana; Mnqobi Yazo	**Best TV Presenter (Male)**: **Robert Marawa** ‡
**Comedian of the Year**: **Siyanda Maphumulo** ‡; Sifiso Nene; Carvin Goldstone; Celeste Ntulo; Felix Hlophe; Thenjiwe Maphumulo	**Best Promoter**: **Dogg DBN** ‡; DJ Tira; Junior Lavie; Kgolo Da Guru; Mjay Zama; Wiseman Mnguni; Xolani Mcineka
**Best Producer**: **Mondli Ngcobo** ‡; Sun-El Musician; Lindani Gumede; Campmasters; DJ Lag; Sketchy Bongo	**Event of the Year**: **Impucuzeko Maskandi Festival** ‡a; Fact Durban Rocks; Ink Kasi; Durban Jazz Festival; Last Dance; Rage; Splashy Fen; Durban Spring Break; Gagasi Beach Fest; Ivyson Tour
**Best Telenovela**: **Imbewu the Seed** ‡; eHostela; Uzalo; Durban Gen	**Best Entertainment Writer**: **Charles Khuzwayo (Isolezwe)** ‡; Jabulani Langa (Daily Sun); Fanelesbonge Bengu (Isolezwe); Ntombi Makhoba (City Press); Sandile Makhoba (Ilanga); Lucky Cain (Ilanga)
**KZN’S Most Loved Cousin**: **Bonang Matheba** ‡; Cassper Nyovest; Boity Thulo; AKA; Kwesta; DJ Maphorisa; Jub Jub; Itumeleng Khune	**Best TV Presenter (Female)**: **Pearl Thusi** ‡; Minnie Dlamini-Jones; Nandi Madida; Nomalanga Shozi; Carishma Basday; Anele Zondo; Ayanda Thabethe
**Coolest Hangout Spot**: **Eyadini Lounge** ‡; Artizen Lounge; Ten11; Egagasini; Nembulas Place; Scrapyard; Mojos; Views on 25; Max's Lifestyle	**Best Male Actor**: **SK Khoza** ‡; Simphiwe Majozi; Bheki Mkwani; Siyabonga Thwala; Thembinkosi Brian Mthembu; Sandile Dlamini; Ntobeko Sishi; Siyabonga Shibe

== Presenters and Performers ==
=== Presenters ===
Name	Role
Somizi Mhlongo	Announcer for the 1st KZN Entertainment Awards
Pearl Thusi	Announcer for the 1st KZN Entertainment Awards

=== Performers ===
Name(s)	Role	Performed
Sjava	Performers	"Ugogo"
Khuzani	Performer	"Ijele"

== Controversy ==
In April 2021, it was announced that the organizers failed to pay the artist their prizes.
