= Julian E. Raymond =

United States Army colonel

Julian Erskine Raymond
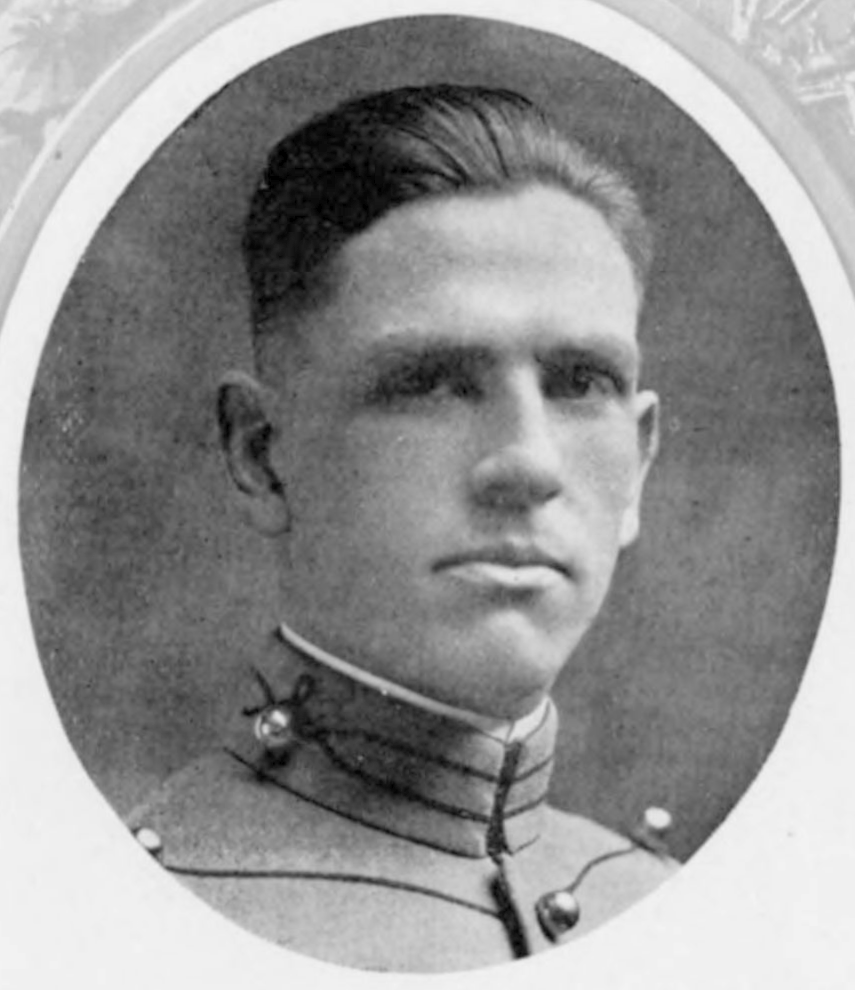
- At West Point in 1920
- Born: Forenames rarely used during life, initials only 28 December 1897; Washington DC
- Died: 30 November 1975 (aged 77); Lincroft, Monmouth County, New Jersey
- Burial place: Cremated
- Spouse: Mildred Clark
- Military career
- Allegiance: United States of America
- Branch: United States Army/Infantry
- Rank: colonel
- Nickname: Bugs
- Unit: SHAEF
- Commands: Europe and CONUS: Commanding Officer 10th Armd Div's Reserve; Deputy Commander Special Allied Airborne Reconnaissance Force SHAEF; Commandant of the European Command Intelligence School; Deputy Chief of the Counter Intelligence Corps; Commanding Officer Camp A P Hill, VA
- Conflicts: Second World War, European Theatre of Operations: Rhineland; Ardennes-Alsace; Central Europe
- Other work: Mayor of Bowling Green, VA and worked for Philco

Julian Erskine Raymond (1897–1975) was a United States Army colonel who served in the European Theatre during the Second World War and after the war in training establishments in Germany and the USA. He was born in Washington DC on 28 December 1897.

He entered the United States Military Academy at West Point on 14 June 1918, and he graduated on 2 July 1920.

On 19 November 1921 Raymond was part of the Pennsylvania Society delegation hosting French Marshal Ferdinand Foch at a celebratory luncheon at the Waldorf-Astoria in New York.

He is recorded as a first lieutenant in Company K, 3rd Battalion, 22nd Infantry Regiment in May 1922. The regiment had recently relocated from various bases in New York state to Fort McPherson, Georgia.

Based on the birth records of his daughters it is clear the Raymond family accompanied J. E. Raymond on a posting to the Canal Zone from 1923 to 1926.

From 1927 to 1930 Raymond was a senior instructor in telegraphy in the Army Signal School at Fort Monmouth in New Jersey. In 1930 he appears as a registered amateur radio enthusiast with call sign "W2BVQ", based at Fort Monmouth.

On 29 November 1940 and 31 May 1941 he was recorded as being a major and staff officer at the US Army General Headquarters located at the Army War College in Washington DC, commanded by Major General Lesley J. McNair. The original Army War College site is now Fort Lesley J. McNair, the College having moved to Carlisle, Pennsylvania.

On 25 September 1941 Raymond accompanied General George C Marshall on a visit to Fort Polk, Louisiana.

On 19 November 1942 Raymond is recorded as Chief of Staff for 10th Armored Division, based at Fort Benning, Georgia. On 22 September 1944 he is still with the Division and commanding officer of the "Reserve Command" as the 10th Armored Division entered the European Theatre of Operations.

On 2 March 1945 Raymond was photographed outside the Hotel Porta Nigra as the US flag is raised in the southwestern German city of Trier, which had fallen that day to armoured units of the US Third Army.

Between March and July 1945, Raymond was posted out of Europe to be Deputy Commander of the Special Allied Airborne Reconnaissance Force (SAARF) a special forces unit based in Wentworth, England, tasked with deep operations targeted at POW camps in Germany.

Between July and November 1945, Raymond was Director of the Troops Division at the Shrivenham American University (SAU), Wiltshire, England.

On 26 July 1948, Raymond was Commandant of the European Command Intelligence School at Oberammergau. He was also Deputy Chief of the Counter Intelligence Corps at Fort Holabird.

From 15 December 1951 to 29 July 1953 Raymond was commander of Camp A P Hill, Virginia. On 1 July 1954 Raymond returned to Camp A P Hill as deputy commander, assuming command on 1 September 1954 and finally relinquishing command of the camp on 30 September 1954 and retiring from the US Army after 34 years service.

In 1958, Raymond resigned as mayor of Bowling Green, Virginia to become the Philco Technical Representative at the Doctrine Division US Army Signal School and he and his wife settled on Pine Street in Lincroft, New Jersey. An avid US Civil War historian and an authority on the Lincoln assassination, on 19 September 1961 J E Raymond gave a talk on Abraham Lincoln to a Methodist church congregation in Neptune, New Jersey.

J. E. Raymond died at Lincroft, New Jersey on 30 November 1975. His wife Mildred pre-deceased him, dying in 1972 (also at Lincroft).
