= Limpopo Champions League =

Studio album by Sho Madjozi
- Released: 14 December 2018
- Genre: Hip hop; gqom; pop
- Length: 48:27
- Label: Flourish & Multiply
- Producer: Tboy Daflame; DJ Alphy; Mafosi Chauke; Makwabeats; Msiyana; PH RawX; Reuben Hlaku; Sam Berson; Seed SA; She's Drunk

Singles from Limpopo Champions League
- 1. "Huku" Released: 9 March 2018; 2. "Wakanda Forever" Released: 30 November 2018; 3. "Idhom" Released: 2 June 2019; 4. "Kona" Released: 16 December 2019

Limpopo Champions League is the debut studio album by South African rapper Sho Madjozi. It was released on 14 December 2018 by Flourish and Multiply.

== Background ==
In an interview with Elle Magazine South Africa, Sho Madjozi said that her debut album, Limpopo Champions League, was conceptualised specifically for both her international following and her African fans. She quoted, "As a female artist, it was also important to her to prove that she can write and produce hits in male-dominated genres such as hip-hop, gqom and dance. I hope that when people listen to the album, they remember who they want to be – and go for it." On 26 November 2018, Madjozi posted on Twitter and Instagram the tracklist of the album and the official date of release.

== Music and lyrics ==
Limpopo Champions League is a diverse album which comprises hip hop, qgom, shangaan electro, trap, afrobeats, house, pop, reggae, dancehall, R&B, and EDM. Madjozi primarily uses the languages Tsonga and English for her vocals, while Zulu, Swahili and Tsotsitaal as featured languages.

The album's opener "Ro Rali" is a shangaan electro song which features the Limpopo "Afro-wedding music"-influenced vocals formed by the guest singer, Makhadzi. "Idhom", the second track and third single, fuses qgom and house music, which according to Madjozi is about a former partner who left her heartbroken and is now regretting for leaving her. "Limpopo Champions League", the title track, is a mid-tempo gqom song with a melody reminiscing the previous track, "Idhom". The following track, "Wa Penga Na?", is a hip hop song with trap influences. It features rappers, Kwesta and Makwa, who both primarily use isiZulu vocals. "Don't Tell Me What To Do" is a pop song with reggae-fused EDM and dancehall elements. "Huku", the lead single, follows with a gqom beat. "Changanya" is a house and kwaito song which features the Tanzanian artist Marioo, and Aubrey Qwana. "Kona" returns shangaan electro, and has a rock-influenced intro. "I Mean That" is a house and kwaito song, while "Yaz'Abelungu" starts with deep-house which leads to a high-tempo Afro-house. "Going Down" then follows which is contemporary R&B, mainly combining hip hop, featuring rapper pH Raw X and uncredited female vocals. "If I Do" is a gqom song, same as the last song, "Wakanda Forever" featuring rapper Ycee, which is the second single.

== Release ==
Limpopo Champions League was made available for online streaming via various platforms, including Spotify and Apple Music, on 14 December 2018 through Flourish & Multiply Records. It was also released for digital download.

=== Singles ===
Sho Madjozi pre-released two songs in supporting the album. "Huku" was released as the album's lead single on 9 March 2018. The song's music video was released on 18 May 2018 on YouTube. The second single, "Wakanda Forever", featuring rapper Ycee, was released on 30 November 2018. Giving her acceptance speech at the 25th edition of the South African Music Awards for Best Female Album, Madjozi said that her third single " Idhom" will be released the following day. It was then released that following day, on 2 June, along with its accompanying music video. "Kona", was featured on the musical drama series, Rhythm City. It was later released as a single on 16 December 2019. "Don't Tell Me What To Do" was featured on the television commercial, by retail company Edgars, which shows Madjozi performing the song on a local street surrounded by various people. The advertisement premiered on 2 November 2018.

== Track listing ==
Credits adapted from Tidal and Spotify.

No.	Title	Writer(s)	Producer(s)	Length
1.	"Ro Rali" (featuring Makhadzi)	Maya Wegerif; Ndivhudzannyi Ralivhona	Reuben Hlaku	3:33
2.	"Idhom"	Wegerif	Tboy Daflame	3:38
3.	"Limpopo Champions League"	Wegerif	Daflame	3:13
4.	"Wa Penga Na?" (featuring Kwesta and Makwa)	Wegerif; Senzo Vilakazi; Neo Makwa	Makwabeats	3:32
5.	"Don't Tell Me What To Do"	Wegerif; Sam Berson	Berson	3:27
6.	"Huku"	Wegerif	Mslyana	3:34
7.	"Changanya" (featuring Marioo and Aubrey Gwana)	Wegerif; Marioo; Aubrey Xwana	DJ Alphy	4:26
8.	"Kona"	Wegerif	Mafosi Chauke	4:15
9.	"I Mean That"	Wegerif	Alphy	4:38
10.	"Yaz' Abelungu"	Wegerif	She's Drunk	3:06
11.	"Going Down" (featuring PH RawX)	Wegerif	PH RawX	4:28
12.	"If I Die"	Wegerif	Daflame	3:02
13.	"Wakanda Forever" (featuring Ycee)	Wegerif; Oludemilade Alejo	Seed SA	3:35
Total length:				48:27

== Personnel ==
=== Musicians ===
- Maya Wegerif – main vocals, executive producer
- Ndivhudzannyi Ralivhona – guest vocals
- Senzo Vilakazi – guest vocals
- Neo Makwa – guest vocals
- Marioo – guest vocals
- Aubrey Qwana – guest vocals
- Gift Nkuna – guest vocals

=== Production ===
- Tboy Daflame – producer
- DJ Alphy – producer
- Mafosi Chauke – producer
- Makwabeats – producer
- Mslyana – producer
- PH RawX – writer and producer
- Reuben Hlaku – producer
- Sam Berson – writer and producer
- Seed SA – producer
- She's Drunk – producer
