= Jerusalema =

2019 single by Master KG featuring Nomcebo Zikode

Single by Master KG featuring Nomcebo

from the album Jerusalema
- Language: Zulu
- Released: 29 November 2019; 10 July 2020 (radio edit)
- Recorded: 2019
- Genre: Gospel-house; Afro house; disco; dance; Bolo house music
- Length: 5:42 (album version); 3:08 (radio edit)
- Label: Elektra France; Warner France; Open Mic
- Songwriters: Nomcebo; Kgaogelo Moagi
- Producer: Master KG

Master KG singles chronology
"Remember" (2019)	"Jerusalema" (2019)	"My Love" (2020)

Nomcebo singles chronology
"Imizamo Yami" (2019)	"Jerusalema" (2019)	"Kobanini" (2020)

Burna Boy singles chronology
"Own It (Remix)" (2020)	"Jerusalema (Remix)" (2020)	"Wonderful" (2020)

Remix cover

Music videos
- "Jerusalema" on YouTube
- "Jerusalema" (Burna Boy remix) on YouTube

"Jerusalema" is a song by South African DJ and record producer Master KG, featuring South African vocalist Nomcebo; its lyrics are in Zulu, one of the official languages of South Africa. The upbeat gospel-influenced house song was initially released on 29 November 2019 after it garnered positive response online, with a music video following on 21 December. The music video of the song has generated half a billion views on YouTube. It was later included on Master KG's second album of the same title, released in January 2020. A single edit was released on streaming services on 10 July 2020, after it went viral during mid-2020, garnering international reaction due to the #JerusalemaDanceChallenge. A remix featuring Nigerian singer Burna Boy was released on 19 June 2020. It reached number one in Belgium, Netherlands, Romania and Switzerland, while peaking in the top ten of multiple other European countries. A second remix featuring Venezuelan singer Micro TDH and Colombian singer Greeicy was released on 17 September 2020.

At the third ceremony of the African Entertainment Awards USA "Jerusalema" won the Song of the Year award.

== Background ==
The song was recorded on 11 August 2019, and after being posted on social media, it received positive responses from fans. Master KG said he called "his sister Nomcebo to come so we can finish the song". The finished version was then uploaded to YouTube in October and officially released on 29 November. It surpassed one million views in its first week. The official music video was released on 21 December 2019. After it went viral, the song was released to streaming services on 10 July by Elektra France and Warner France. Upon its release, some deemed it a "tavern" song. Master KG stated: "Some call it tavern music, and I said, 'It's okay, wait and let me show what tavern music can do to the world'". During late 2019, it had become a favourite in South African clubs. Prior to the COVID-19 lockdown, Master KG had travelled to Portugal to promote his album, and said he put more emphasis on the song's dance during his shows.

== Composition ==
Although it has "religious-leaning" lyrics, "Jerusalema" is an upbeat disco-house track containing "deep", "spiritual", gospel lyrics. Lyrically, as noted by OkayAfrica's Rufaro Samanga, "it speaks about Jerusalem being the home of many religious believers". The remix sees Burna Boy incorporating his signature Afrobeats style, singing part of his verse in Zulu and part in Yoruba while emphasizing the unity of African artists.

== Critical reception ==
The song received largely positive reviews from music critics. Zkhiphani's Mandisa Ntsindee opined that the song "has reached heights no other South African song has ever in the past", calling Nomcebo a "powerhouse vocalist" and said "the South African music scene has been preparing for this exact kind of exposure with a song that is fiercely ours". Music in Africa named it "without [a] doubt" one of the biggest South African house songs of 2020, with the magazine's Ano Shumba stating "Nomcebo has cemented her presence on the local house music scene". Rufaro Samanga of OkayAfrica called the remix "a straight banger".

== Royalty dispute ==
In July 2021 Nomcebo Zikode claimed that she had not received any payment from her record label, Open Mic Production. The label responded that this was the result of an unresolved dispute over the percentage split between Nomcebo and Master KG.

== Impact ==
Master KG's Spotify followers increased to over 1.2 million following the rising popularity of the song. Various covers performed around the world with different instruments and sung in a variety of languages have also been uploaded on YouTube, attracting their own popularity. The song was also picked up by radio stations around the world. Between 26 August 2020 and 23 September 2020, the top three countries with the highest number of radio plays were Italy (with 16586 radio plays), France (with 15440 radio plays), and Germany (with 2411 radio plays). However, it has also had an impact in countries such as Curaçao (235 radio plays), Israel (50 radio plays), and Thailand (47 radio plays).

=== Dance challenge ===
An accompanying dance challenge, attributed to a group of Angolan friends performing the choreography in a candid video, helped the song go viral online. The #JerusalemaChallenge, which has been compared to the Macarena, spawned dance videos from across many countries, including the Netherlands, Portugal, Sweden, Italy, Romania, Spain, France, Jamaica, Canada, the United States, Sri Lanka and Israel, in particular in Jerusalem itself. In Germany, workers paid tribute to Berlin’s Tegel Airport by dancing to Jerusalema on the tarmac and in the now-shuttered terminal. The Swiss Federal Office of Police challenged the Irish Garda Síochána to the Jerusalema dance challenge, which they accepted. The video was well received in the two countries with the Swiss police flying the Irish flag at their headquarters for the day.

The challenge faced a major drawback when Warner Music Group began to ask for copyright compensation for using the song.

== Music video ==
The song's official music video was released onto YouTube on 21 December 2019. By 27 August the video had passed 100 million views, half a year later it passed already 300 million views, a rare feat for South African artists.

== Charts ==
=== Weekly charts ===
Weekly chart performance for "Jerusalema" Remix
Chart (2020–2021)	Peak position
Austria (Ö3 Austria Top 40)	2
Belgium (Ultratop 50 Flanders)	1
Belgium (Ultratop 50 Wallonia)	1
Canadian Digital Songs (Billboard)	9
Czech Republic Airplay (ČNS IFPI)	59
Euro Digital Songs (Billboard)	1
France (SNEP)	2
Germany (GfK)	3
Global 200 (Billboard)	38
Hungary (Dance Top 40)	7
Hungary (Rádiós Top 40)	1
Hungary (Single Top 40)	1
Ireland (IRMA)	4
Italy (FIMI)	2
Netherlands (Dutch Top 40)	1
Netherlands (Single Top 100)	2
Nicaragua (Monitor Latino)	10
Panama (Monitor Latino)	17
Portugal (AFP)	15
Portugal Airplay (AFP)	2
Romania (Airplay 100)	1
San Marino (SMRRTV Top 50)	37
Scotland Singles (Official Charts)	14
Slovakia Airplay (ČNS IFPI)	4
Slovakia Singles Digital (ČNS IFPI)	46
South Africa (SAARF)	1
Spain (PROMUSICAE)	10
Suriname (Nationale Top 40)	1
Sweden (Sverigetopplistan)	3
Switzerland (Schweizer Hitparade)	1
UK Singles (Official Charts)	55
US Hot Dance/Electronic Songs (Billboard)	9
US World Digital Song Sales (Billboard)	1

=== Year-end charts ===
2020 year-end chart performance for "Jerusalema" Remix
Chart (2020)	Position
Austria (Ö3 Austria Top 40)	46
Belgium (Ultratop Flanders)	11
Belgium (Ultratop Wallonia)	5
France (SNEP)	16
Germany (Official German Charts)	49
Hungary (Single Top 40)	8
Italy (FIMI)	11
Netherlands (Dutch Top 40)	12
Netherlands (Single Top 100)	28
Romania (Airplay 100)	45
Spain (PROMUSICAE)	74
Switzerland (Schweizer Hitparade)	7
US Hot Dance/Electronic Songs (Billboard)	35

2021 year-end chart performance for "Jerusalema" Remix
Chart (2021)	Position
Austria (Ö3 Austria Top 40)	32
Belgium (Ultratop Flanders)	55
France (SNEP)	37
Germany (Official German Charts)	34
Global 200 (Billboard)	184
Hungary (Dance Top 40)	25
Hungary (Rádiós Top 40)	12
Hungary (Single Top 40)	3
Netherlands (Airplay Top 50)	43
Portugal (AFP)	97
Sweden (Sverigetopplistan)	17
Switzerland (Schweizer Hitparade)	2
US Hot Dance/Electronic Songs (Billboard)	91

2022 year-end chart performance for "Jerusalema" Remix
Chart (2022)	Position
Hungary (Dance Top 40)	56

== Certifications ==
Certifications for "Jerusalema'
Region	Certification	Certified units/sales
Denmark (IFPI Danmark)	Gold	45,000^{‡}
Poland (ZPAV)	Diamond	250,000^{‡}
Spain (Promusicae)	2× Platinum	80,000^{‡}
United Kingdom (BPI)	Gold	400,000^{‡}
United States (RIAA)	Gold	500,000^{‡}
^{‡} Sales+streaming figures based on certification alone.

Certifications for "Jerusalema" (Burna Boy remix)
Region	Certification	Certified units/sales
Austria (IFPI Austria)	Gold	15,000^{‡}
Belgium (BRMA)	2× Platinum	80,000^{‡}
France (SNEP)	Diamond	333,333^{‡}
Germany (BVMI)	Platinum	400,000^{‡}
Italy (FIMI)	4× Platinum	280,000^{‡}
Portugal (AFP)	2× Platinum	20,000^{‡}
^{‡} Sales+streaming figures based on certification alone.

== See also ==
- List of Airplay 100 number ones of the 2020s
