= List of number-one albums of 2020 (Belgium) =

Music

The Belgian Albums Chart, divided into the two main regions of Flanders and Wallonia, ranks the best-performing albums in Belgium, as compiled by Ultratop.

== Flanders ==
List of number-one albums of 2020 in Flanders
Issue date	Album	Artist	Reference
4 January	Boven de wolken	Niels Destadsbader	
11 January	Boven de wolken	Niels Destadsbader	
18 January	Rare	Selena Gomez	
25 January	Music to Be Murdered By	Eminem	
1 February	Bitterzoet	Eefje de Visser	
8 February	Music to Be Murdered By	Eminem	
15 February	Brol	Angèle	
22 February	Boven de wolken	Niels Destadsbader	
29 February	Map of the Soul: 7	BTS	
7 March	Map of the Soul: 7	BTS	
14 March	Boven de wolken	Niels Destadsbader	
21 March	#LikeMe – Seizoen 2	#LikeMe Cast	
28 March	After Hours	The Weeknd	
4 April	#LikeMe – Seizoen 2	#LikeMe Cast	
11 April	#LikeMe – Seizoen 2	#LikeMe Cast	
18 April	#LikeMe – Seizoen 2	#LikeMe Cast	
25 April	#LikeMe – Seizoen 2	#LikeMe Cast	
2 May	#LikeMe – Seizoen 2	#LikeMe Cast	
9 May	Cleymans & Van Geel	Cleymans & Van Geel	
16 May	#LikeMe – Seizoen 2	#LikeMe Cast	
23 May	Liefde voor muziek (2020)	Various artists	
30 May	Liefde voor muziek (2020)	Various artists	
6 June	Liefde voor muziek (2020)	Various artists	
13 June	Liefde voor muziek (2020)	Various artists	
20 June	Liefde voor muziek (2020)	Various artists	
27 June	Liefde voor muziek (2020)	Various artists	
4 July	Liefde voor muziek (2020)	Various artists	
11 July	Liefde voor muziek (2020)	Various artists	
18 July	Liefde voor muziek (2020)	Various artists	
25 July	Liefde voor muziek (2020)	Various artists	
1 August	Folklore	Taylor Swift	
8 August	Tura 80	Will Tura	
15 August	Tura 80	Will Tura	
22 August	Tura 80	Will Tura	
29 August	Tura 80	Will Tura	
5 September	S&M2	Metallica and the San Francisco Symphony	
12 September	Tura 80	Will Tura	
19 September	Tura 80	Will Tura	
26 September	Thuis	André Hazes Jr.	
3 October	Thuis	André Hazes Jr.	
10 October	Thuis	André Hazes Jr.	
17 October	Thuis	André Hazes Jr.	
24 October	Serpentine Prison	Matt Berninger	
31 October	Letter to You	Bruce Springsteen	
7 November	Letter to You	Bruce Springsteen	
14 November	Letter to You	Bruce Springsteen	
21 November	Dans van de Farao	K3	
28 November	Dans van de Farao	K3	
5 December	Dans van de Farao	K3	
12 December	Thuis	André Hazes Jr.	
19 December	Thuis	André Hazes Jr.	
26 December	Thuis	André Hazes Jr.	

== Wallonia ==
List of number-one albums of 2020 in Wallonia
Issue date	Album	Artist	Reference
4 January	Brol	Angèle	
11 January	Brol	Angèle	
18 January	VersuS	Vitaa and Slimane	
25 January	Aloha	Typh Barrow	
1 February	Aloha	Typh Barrow	
8 February	MVP	Mister V	
15 February	VersuS	Vitaa and Slimane	
22 February	VersuS	Vitaa and Slimane	
29 February	VersuS	Vitaa and Slimane	
7 March	VersuS	Vitaa and Slimane	
14 March	Le Pari(s) des Enfoirés	Les Enfoirés	
21 March	M.I.L.S 3	Ninho	
28 March	M.I.L.S 3	Ninho	
4 April	M.I.L.S 3	Ninho	
11 April	M.I.L.S 3	Ninho	
18 April	High & Fine Herbes	Caballero & JeanJass	
25 April	M.I.L.S 3	Ninho	
2 May	Maison	Roméo Elvis	
9 May	Brol	Angèle	
16 May	Brol	Angèle	
23 May	Brol	Angèle	
30 May	Brol	Angèle	
6 June	Sillygomania	Loïc Nottet	
13 June	Sillygomania	Loïc Nottet	
20 June	Sillygomania	Loïc Nottet	
27 June	La machine	Jul	
4 July	Grand Prix	Benjamin Biolay	
11 July	Neverland	RK	
18 July	La vie est belle	Gambi	
25 July	Les derniers salopards	Maes	
1 August	Les derniers salopards	Maes	
8 August	Brol	Angèle	
15 August	Whoosh!	Deep Purple	
22 August	Brol	Angèle	
29 August	Brol	Angèle	
5 September	Singles Collection (2001–2021)	Indochine	
12 September	Aimée	Julien Doré	
19 September	Mesdames	Grand Corps Malade	
26 September	QALF	Damso	
3 October	QALF	Damso	
10 October	Un air de famille	Patrick Fiori	
17 October	Mi vida	Kendji Girac	
24 October	À l'Aube revenant	Francis Cabrel	
31 October	Son rêve américain	Johnny Hallyday	
7 November	À l'Aube revenant	Francis Cabrel	
14 November	À l'Aube revenant	Francis Cabrel	
21 November	Power Up	AC/DC	
28 November	Be	BTS	
5 December	Power Up	AC/DC	
12 December	Centre ville	Calogero	
19 December	Singles Collection (1981–2001)	Indochine	
26 December	Singles Collection (1981–2001)	Indochine	

== See also ==
- List of Ultratop 50 number-one singles of 2020
