= Gigi Lamayne =

South African rapper

- Also known as: Gigi Lamayne
- Born: Genesis Gabriella Tina Manney; 7 July 1994 (age 32); Lenasia, South Africa
- Genres: Hip-hop
- Occupations: Rapper; singer; songwriter
- Years active: 2014–present
- Labels: Mabala Noise; Ambitiouz Entertainment

Genesis Gabriella Tina Manney (born 7 July 1994), known professionally as Gigi Lamayne, is a South African rapper.

== Life and career ==
=== 2001–2012: Education ===
Lamayne attended Dominican Convent School in Johannesburg (2001–2012) and started writing poetry at the age of 11. Lamayne attended Wits University and obtained a degree in Media and Anthropology.

=== 2010–2014: Career beginnings ===
Her interest in rapping began at the age of 16, with assistance from Scratchbeats records, she released her first mixtape titled El Principio-16 with help from Munya "Lym C" Chanetsa, Mitchan "Pinkaso" Adams, and Clint Allin. In 2013, she was a runner-up at National Sprite Uncontainable Festival and competed on Shiz Niz Mixtape competition and won, before signing a record deal with Bentey Records. In 2014, Lamayne was contestant at Jack Daniel's Music Scouts Competition and won. She was discovered by PRO and signed her to his record label, Money First Entertainment. She won Best Female at the South African Hip Hop Awards in 2013. Her first project album Colour Reign was released on October 2, 2014, produced by Tuxman.

=== 2015–2020: iGenesis, VI, Jobs Woods ===
In early 2015, she released her single "Ice Cream" which became successful and topped radio charts, and was later remixed by Khuli Chana. On September 15, "Jungle Fever" was released as the album's lead single and debuted at number 1 on the African Top Ten Charts. In 2016, She signed a record deal with Mabala Noise and began to record her new album.

Her debut studio album iGenesis was scheduled to be released in July 2016. iGenesis was released in October 2016. The album was supported by three singles, "Jungle Fever", "Shisa" and "Is'gubhu" featuring Duncan. In December 2016, she headlined the NH7 Weekender event, which was held in Pune. At the 2016 South African Hip Hop Awards, Lamayne was nominated for Best Female, Best Mixtape and the Hustler of the Year. In June 23, her single "Lobola" featuring Maraza was released accompanied with a music video. She headlined to Basha Uhuru Freedom Festival on June 24.

In December 19, Lamayne departed with Mabala Noise. In early January 2018, Lamayne signed a record deal with Ambitiouz Entertainment and released her new extended play, VI on July 13, 2018. On January 29, her single "Iphupho" was released. On May 17, her single "Fufu" featuring King Monada was released. On February 1, her single "Bozza" featuring Kwesta was released and debuted at the summit of the Top 50 RAMS Chart.

On July 26, 2019, her extended play Jobs Woods was released. In April 2020, she made her screen debut on Hair Jury as a presenter, which premiered on April 1 on the Soweto TV channel. In May 2020, she embarked on the Gigi Gang Show in South Africa and toured alongside Nadia Nakai, Moozlie and Boity Thulo.

In March 2020, she made her screen debut on Hairy Jury as a host, which airs on Soweto TV.

=== 2021–present: Mermaids and Stuff and Set In Stone ===
On June 4, her single "Feelin U" featuring Blxckie and Mi Casa was released as the album's lead single. On July 15, 2021, her fourth studio album Mermaids and Stuff was released and received positive reviews from music critics overall. On September 17, it was announced that she would host TikTok's Africa music chart show. At the 2021 Women of Wonder Awards, she won an award. She received a nomination for Best Female at the 2021 annual South African Hip Hop Awards.

In February 2022, she announced her fourth studio album, Set In Stone, and the release date.

Set In Stone was released on May 20, 2020. It features artists Majorsteez, Big Zulu, Busiswa, MusiholiQ, Makhadzi and Kid X.

In 2023, Lamayne made her voice acting debut in the Disney+ animated original Kizazi Moto: Generation Fire.

== Influences ==
Gigi Lamayne was inspired by the likes of Jean Grae, Bob Marley, Brenda Fassie and Tupac Shakur.

== Endorsements ==
In February 2017, she was announced as the ambassador of Run the Streets Campaign by Puma.

In early February 2018, she was the ambassador of the Avon product fragrance called Free.

In May 2022, she announced a partnership with Fenty Africa.

In August 2023, Lamayne was announced as the ambassador of Afroslim International.

== Tours ==
- Gigi Gang Show (2020)

== Discography ==
=== Studio albums ===
- Colour of reign (2014)
- i-Genesis (2016)
- Mermaids and stuff (2021)
- Set In Stone (2022)

=== EPs ===
- I.V (2018)
- Job woods (2018)

=== As lead artist ===
List of singles as lead artist, with selected chart positions and certifications, showing year released and album name
| Title | Year | Peak chart positions | Certifications | Album |
| Title | Year | ZA | Certifications | Album |
|---|---|---|---|---|
| "Lobola" (featuring Maraza) | 2017 | — | | |
| "Bozza" (featuring Kwesta) | 2018 | — | | |
| "Fufa" (featuring King Monada) | 2019 | — | | |
| "Koze Kube Nini" (featuring Eminent Fam) | 2019 | — | | |
| "The Rap up (2019)" | 2019 | — | | |
| "Mojo Jojo" (featuring Bri Biase) | 2020 | — | | |
| "Stocko" (Abobhuti Bendawo, Gigi Lamayne, Bospianii) | 2020 | — | | |
| "Slaap Tiger" (featuring DJ Tira, NaakMusiq, Just Bheki) | 2020 | — | | |
| "My Body (Stand up)" (Merichan, Lira, Gigi Lamayne featuring Goodluck) | 2020 | — | | |
| "Fxck Everybody" | 2021 | — | | |
| "Mashonisa" (featuring Busiswa, Makhadzi) | 2022 | — | | Non-album single |
| "Gedlela (Gigi Lamayne, Mr Smeg featuring Lwah Ndlunkulu) | 2022 | — | | |
| "Ho Ho Ho" | 2022 | | | |
| "Menzi Ngubane" (Gigi Lamayne, Lady Du, Robot Boii featuring Ntosh Gazi & Mustbedubz) | 2023 | — | | |
| "Let My People Go" (Gigi Lamayne, Megatronic) | 2023 | — | | Non-album single |
| "Qoqo" (Gigi Lamayne, Okyeame Kwame, Holy Ten) | 2023 | — | | |
| "Our Father" (No Kredit, Gigi Lamayne, Piwe357) | 2023 | — | | |
| "Please Fix" | 2024 | — | | |
| "Ayi 4" (Busta 929, Gigi Lamayne featuring Sizwe Alakine) | 2024 | — | | |
"—" denotes a recording that did not chart or was not released in that territory.

== Awards ==
Gigi Lamayne won the best female at the South African Hip Hop Awards in 2013 and in 2014. She also won the Jack Scouts challenge endorsed by Jack Daniel's in 2013 and 2015 where the winners were given prizes, including a trip to Miami.

| Year | Nominee / work | Award | Result | Ref. |
|---|---|---|---|---|
| 2022 | Herself | Rap/Hip Hop Artist of the Year | Won | |

=== National Film and Television Awards ===
| Year | Nominee / work | Award | Result |
|---|---|---|---|
| 2023 | Herself | Best Female Personality | Nominated |

== See also ==
- List of South African musicians
