= Zanda Zakuza =

South African singer-songwriter

- Born: Zanda Zakuza; 1993 (age 32–33): Umlazi, KwaZulu-Natal, South Africa
- Genres: Afro-soul
- Occupations: singer and songwriter
- Instrument: vocals
- Label: Open Mic Productions

Zanda Zakuza, also known as Zanda "Dragon" Zakuza is a South African house and kwaito singer and songwriter. Born and raised in Umlazi, she achieved widespread popularity after featuring on the singles "Skeleton Move" by Master KG and "Club Controller" (2019) by Prince Kaybee.

== Life and career ==
Zakuza was born and raised in Durban, KwaZulu-Natal but her family are from Bizana in the Eastern Cape.

She attended Pinetown Girls' High School and later enrolled at the University of KwaZulu-Natal, where she studied music, specialising in jazz. Zanda left in her second year to pursue a music career; she, however, later returned to college to study business management and human resources.

At an early age she preferred dancing and sports, and engaged in music while in high school.

=== Music career ===
After dropping out of university she made it clear that she spent a while without a job but before she was successful in music. She joined the industry in 2015 and signed a record deal with Open Mic Productions. On May 25, 2018, She released her debut studio album Synthia The Journey, was released. The album describes the life of her mother supporting her music career. The album includes collaboration from Bongo Beats, Spirit Banger, Dr Moruti and Doc Shebeleza. On October 3, 2020, her single "Khaya Lam" featuring Master KG and Prince Benza was released.

On September 24, 2021, her single "Afrika" featuring Mr Six21 DJ, Bravo De Virus and Fallo SA was released. She received nominations for Best Female Artist in South Africa at All Africa Music Awards.

== Tours ==
=== Co-headlining ===
- Jerusalem Live Concert (2021) (with Master KG)

== Discography ==
=== Studio albums ===
- Synthia The Journey (2018)

=== Guest appearances ===
Title	Year	Other artist(s)	Album
"Baloi"	2025	Makhadzi	Sesi Ka Rose

== Awards and nominations ==
Year	Awards	Category	Results	Ref.
2020	KZN Entertainment Awards	Best female artist	Nominated	
2021	All Africa Music Awards	Best Female Artist in South Africa	Nominated	
