= John Cena (song) =

Song by Sho Madjozi

Single by Sho Madjozi
- Released: 27 September 2019
- Genre: Gqom
- Length: 3:02
- Label: Flourish & Multiply
- Songwriter(s): Sho Madjozi
- Producer(s): Tboy Daflame & DJ Exit

Sho Madjozi singles chronology
"Idhom" (2019)	"John Cena" (2019)

"John Cena" is a song by South African rapper Sho Madjozi. It was made about the WWE professional wrestler John Cena. It was released as a single through Flourish & Multiply Records on 27 September 2019, after being performed on the global music platform, COLORS, uploaded on 15 August 2019. The song was written by Sho Madjozi and produced by Tboy Daflame and DJ Exit.

== Background ==
"John Cena" was written independently by Sho Madjozi. On 14 August 2019, COLORS announced Sho Madjozi would be the next artist to be featured on the platform. COLORS and Madjozi uploaded the performance on the next day. The song was produced by Tboy Daflame, who previously produced Madjozi's 2018 songs, which include "If I Die" and the single, "Idhom", all from her debut album Limpopo Champions League. The song was released as a single to streaming and digital platforms through Flourish & Multiply Records on 27 September 2019.

== Composition ==
"John Cena" is a gqom song with hip hop vocals featuring the languages Tsonga, Swahili and English in its lyrics. According to Cape Talk and 702, Madjozi said: "I grew up watching American professional wrestler John Cena, so it was only natural to make a jam about him."

== Live performances ==
As her debut, Sho Madjozi performed the song on COLORS, standing next to the mic in the studio covered with blue background. After the formation of the social media challenge "John Cena Challenge", many individuals engaged on the challenge, leading the song to become viral. Following the spread of the challenge, John Cena himself was featured on The Ellen DeGeneres Show, where he was asked by Ellen DeGeneres to dance to the song alongside Stephen Boss.

The song was also performed by Sho Madjozi at several events throughout South Africa and other regions, including the Afropunk Festival held on 13 October 2019 in Atlanta, US. Madjozi performed the song on The Kelly Clarkson Show in November 2019. During the performance, she was surprised by John Cena dancing right behind her while she was performing. It was the first time she met Cena in person. On 17 November 2019, Madjozi performed the song on the finale of the South African-franchise of the reality television singing competition Idols, for season 15.

== Release history ==
Region	Date	Format	Label
Various	27 September 2019	Digital download; streaming	Flourish & Multiply
