= Ghanama =

Single by Makhadzi featuring Prince Benza

from the album African Queen
- Released: 7 July 2021
- Genre: House; Amapiano
- Label: Open Mic Productions
- Songwriter: Ndivhudzannyi Rhalivhona

Makhadzi singles chronology
"Mjolo" (2021)	"Ghanama" (2021)	"Tchukutsha" (2021)

Prince Benza singles chronology
"Ghanama" (2021)

"Ghanama" is a single by South African singer and songwriter Makhadzi, featuring Prince Benza, released on 7 July 2021, through Open Mic Productions.

The song was certified double platinum in South Africa.

== Commercial performance ==
The song was certified 2× Platinum in South Africa and surpassed over million streams on Spotify.

== Accolades ==
Year	Nominee / work	Award	Result	Ref.
2022	"Ghanama"	Favourite Song	Won	

== Controversy ==
Initially the song was set to be released by Makhadzi featuring King Monada, and Prince Benza. After the song was recorded, was teased on online platform and it received position feedback. Later after the song was about to be released King Monada had a fight with Makhadzi over a song ownership, who claimed it to be his song.

In 7 July, Makhadzi decided to release a song with Prince Benza.

== Sdala B and Paige version ==
=== Track listing ===
Digital download and streaming

1. "Ghanama (Zulu version)" – 4:13

== Certifications ==
Region	Certification	Certified units/Sales
South Africa (RiSA)	2× Platinum	60 000+

== Release ==
"Ghanama" was released on 7 July 2021.
