= African Queen (album) =

Studio album by Makhadzi
- Released: 3 September 2021
- Length: 60:47
- Label: Open Mic
- Producer: Kabelo Motha

Makhadzi chronology
Kokovha (2020)	African Queen (2021)	African Queen 2.0 (2022)

African Queen is the third studio album by South African singer Makhadzi, released on 3 September 2021 by Open Mic. It features Mkomasan, Prince Benza, Mr Brown, DJ Dance Okashi, Vee Mampeezy, Jon Delinger, Kabza De Small, Lady Du, Cassper Nyovest, Mr Bow, and Mlindo the Vocalist.

African Queen was certified gold in South Africa.

== Background ==
Album's release date was announced via her Twitter account on 16 August 2021.

== Commercial performance ==
The album was certified gold in South Africa.

== Track listing ==
African Queen track listing
No.	Title	Length
1.	"Zwivhuya" (featuring Jon Delinger)	4:35
2.	"Hallelujah Amen"	4:44
3.	"Salungano" (featuring Kabza De Small)	6:56
4.	"Vhutshilo"	4:43
5.	"Connection" (featuring Kabza De Small)	6:22
6.	"Tchukutsha" (Makhadzi, Lady Du)	5:48
7.	"Kolongonya"	5:10
8.	"Thanana Boo" (featuring Mkomasan)	4:27
9.	"Calling My Name"	4:27
10.	"Ghanama" (featuring Prince Benza)	4:53
11.	"Ndoneta" (featuring Mr Brown)	4:26
12.	"Energy" (featuring DJ Dance)	4:34
13.	"Muloro" (featuring Mr Brown)	4:23
14.	"Vhanna Vhavhathu" (featuring Okashi)	4:28
15.	"Gidimani" (featuring Cassper Nyovest, Mr Brown)	5:04
16.	"Ma Yellowbone" (featuring Prince Benza)	5:13
17.	"Beke Le Beke" (featuring Vee Mampeezy)	5:09
18.	"Makhwapheni" (featuring Mr Bow)	5:18
19.	"Mjolo" (featuring Mlindo the Vocalist)	5:54
20.	"Albert"	6:18
21.	"Zwotanganana"	3:47
Total length:		60:47

== Certification and sales ==
Certifications and sales for African Queen
Region	Certification	Certified units/sales
South Africa (RISA)	Platinum	30,000^{‡}
^{‡} Sales+streaming figures based on certification alone.

== Release history ==
Release dates and formats for African Queen
Region	Date	Format(s)	Label	Ref.
South Africa	3 September 2021	Digital download; streaming	Open Mic	
