= Master KG =

South African musician and record producer

- Born: Kgaogelo Moagi; 31 January 1996 (age 30); Tzaneen, Limpopo, Republic of South Africa
- Musical career
- Genres: Afro house; Electro; Afropop; House
- Occupations: Music producer; DJ; Singer
- Years active: 2016–present
- Labels: Open Mic Productions (former); Wanitwa Mos Entertainment

Kgaogelo Moagi (born 31 January 1996), professionally known as Master KG is a South African DJ, singer and record producer. Born and raised in Tzaneen, his debut studio album Skeleton Move achieved acclaim including an AFRIMA Award for Best Artist/Group in the African Electro category. He is also known as the pioneer of "Bolobedu" dance.

His second studio album Jerusalema (2020) was released, containing international successful single: "Jerusalema", featuring Nomcebo Zikode and Burna Boy, was certified diamond by FRA and topped Billboard's World Digital Song Sales chart.

== Early life ==
Master KG grew up in Calais Village in Limpopo. He started experimenting with music beats at the age of thirteen using a computer that his late uncle had bought him.

== Personal life ==
Master KG was in a relationship with musician Makhadzi. Around early 2022 he re-united the relationship between him and Makhadzi and crowned it up with Kulakwe as they celebrated the Valentine's Day together. They split up in 2023.

== Career ==
Master KG's music career started when he got in touch with DJ Maebela and they began experimenting with music software specifically FL Studio. In 2016, after much practice, he released his first single "Situation".

=== 2017–2020: Skeleton Move (2018) ===
After getting signed to his former record label, Open Mic Productions, he released his chart-topping single "Skeleton Move" featuring Zanda Zakuza. On 21 September 2018, his debut album Skeleton Move was released. The album features artists including Zanda Zakuza, Makhadzi, Team Mosha and many others. He sings in his local language Khelobedu, a language spoken by Lobedu People. Master KG has performed in a number of other countries including Zambia. In December 2018, his song "Skeleton Move" was apparently voted Thobela FM's song of the year and sparked controversy as King Monada's fans felt "Malwedhe" (which is King Monada's song) deserved the award.

In December 2019, Master KG released the song "Jerusalema", featuring Nomcebo Zikode. In mid-2020, it went viral online, charting internationally and spawning a remix with Burna Boy. The video of "Jerusalema" was taken down on YouTube on the late hours of 5 August 2020, but was restored on the following day. The song earned him the MTV Europe Music Awards, NJR Music Awards in France, Feather Awards, and African Muzik Magazine Awards. The song Jerusalem also caused a stir after nomcebo zikode claimed it's her song whereas she was featured on it and it caused misunderstanding between the two when nomcebo wanted more percentage of the royalties. He signed a record deal with Elektra France. At the 2020 edition of African Muzik Magazine Awards he took-home three awards Best Male Southern Africa, Best Collaboration, Song of the Year and Artist of the Year Award.

=== 2021–present: Makhelwane ===
On 26 May 2021, he released a single titled "Shine Your Light" with David Guetta featuring Akon.

In September 2021, he embarked to Jerusalem Live Concert Tour to United Kingdom in support of his album, toured with Zanda Zakuza.

"Dali Nguwe" featuring Nkosazana Daughter, Basetsana, Obeey Amor was released on December 3, 2021. The song charted number 1 on Local Radio Chart Top 100.

His single "Makhelwane" with Nkosazana Daughter was released on November 17, 2023 as albums lead single.

In July 2024, Nkosazana Daughter and Master KG announced their collaboration studio album Makhelwane. The album was released on August 30, 2024.

Makhelwane was certified gold in South Africa with over 100 million streams on its first day.

== Tours ==
=== Headlining ===
- Jerusalem Live Concert (2021)

== Discography ==
=== Albums ===
Title	Details	Peak chart positions							Certifications
Title	Details	AUT	BEL (Fl)	BEL (WA)	FRA	GER	NL	SWI	Certifications
Skeleton Move	Released: 7 September 2018; Label: Open Mic; Format: Digital download, CD	—	—	—	—	—	—	—	
Jerusalema	Released: 14 December 2019; Label: Warner France, Elektra France, Open Mic; Format: Digital download, CD	54	35	41	27	32	10	12	SNEP: Gold
"—" denotes a recording that did not chart or was not released.

=== Singles ===
==== As lead artist ====
Title	Year	Peak chart positions										Certifications	Album
Title	Year	SA	AUT	BEL (FL)	BEL (WA)	FRA	GER	NL	SWE	SWI	UK	Certifications	Album
"Skeleton Move" (featuring Zanda Zakuza)	2018	—	—	—	—	—	—	—	—	—	—		Skeleton Move
"Remember"	2019	—	—	—	—	—	—	—	—	—	—		Non-album single
"Jerusalema" (featuring Nomcebo)	2019	1	2	1	1	2	3	2	3	1	55	BEA: 2× Platinum; BPI: Gold; BVMI: Platinum; IFPI AUT: Gold; SNEP: Diamond	Jerusalema
"Shine Your Light" (with David Guetta featuring Akon)	2021	33	—	—	29	—	—	—	96	—	—		Non-album single
"Dali Nguwe" (featuring Nkosazana Daughter, Basetsana, Obeey Amor)	2021	1	—	—	—	—	—	—	—	—	—		Non-album single
"Keneilwe" (Wanitwa Mos, Master KG, Nkosazana Daughter)	2023	3	—	—	—	—	—	—	—	—	—		Non-album single
"Dubula" (Harry Cane, Master KG, DJ Latimmy)	2023	4	—	—	—	—	—	—	—	—	—		Non-album single
"—" denotes a recording that did not chart or was not released.

Others

- "Jerusalema" (remix) – Master KG feat. Burna Boy & Nomcebo Zikode (2020)
- "Jerusalema" (remix) – Master KG feat. Micro TDH & Greeicy & Nomcebo Zikode (2020) Dali Nguwe

==== As featured artist ====
Title	Year	Album
"Tshikwama" (Makhadzi featuring Master KG)	2019	Non-album singles
"My Love" (Makhadzi ft. Master KG & Prince Benza)	2020	Non-album singles
"Xola Moya Wam'" (Nomcebo Zikode ft. Master KG)	2020	Non-album singles
"My Melody" (Nox featuring Master KG)	2020	Non-album singles
"Ntyilo Ntyilo" (Rethabile Khumalo featuring Master KG)	2020	Non-album singles
"Khaya Lam" (Zanda Zakuza featuring Master KG & Prince Benza)	2020	Non-album singles
"This Is Love" (Bongo Beats featuring Master KG & Andiswa)	2021	Non-album singles

== Awards and nominations ==
Year	Award	Category	Nominated work	Associated Artists	Result	Ref.
2018	AFRIMMA	Best Artiste, Duo or Group In African Electro	"Skeleton Move"	Zanda Zakuza	Won	
2018	SABC Summer Song	Song of the Year	"Skeleton Move"	Zanda Zakuza	Won	
2018	Limpopo Music Awards	Best Dance Song	"Skeleton Move"	Zanda Zakuza	Won	
2018	Limpopo Music Awards	Best Music Video	"Skeleton Move"	Zanda Zakuza	Nominated	
2018	Limpopo Music Awards	Best Song	"Skeleton Move"	Zanda Zakuza	Nominated	
2018	Limpopo Music Awards	Best Dance Song	"Skeleton Move"	Zanda Zakuza	Nominated	
2019	African Musik Magazine Awards	Best Male Artist Southern Africa	—N/a	—N/a	Won	
2020	NRJ Music Awards	International song of the year	Jerusalem	Nomcebo Zikode	Won	
2020	2020 African Entertainment Awards USA	Song of the Year	"Jerusalema"	Nomcebo and Burna Boy	Won	
2020	MTV Europe Music Awards	Best African Act	Himself		Won	
2020	African Muzik Magazine Awards	Best Male Southern Africa			Won	
2020	African Muzik Magazine Awards	Best Collaboration	"Jerusalema"	Burna Boy	Won	
2020	African Muzik Magazine Awards	Artist of the Year			Won	
2020	African Muzik Magazine Awards	Song of The Year			Won	
2020	African Muzik Magazine Awards	AFRIMMA Video of the Year			Nominated	
2021	Vodafone Ghana Music Awards	African Artist of the Year			Won	
2021	K H M A	Best Producer			Nominated	
2021	Net Honours	Most Played Alternative Song	"Jerusalema"	Nomcebo and Burna Boy	Nominated	
2021	SAMA 27	International Achievement Award			Won	
2021	SAMA 27	SAMRO Composer highest Airplay		Nomcebo Zikode	Won	
2021	VN Awards	Male Artist of the Year			Won	
2021	Global Music Awards Africa	Global Artist of the Year			Nominated	
2021	Global Music Awards Africa	Songwriter of the Year			Nominated	
2021	Global Music Awards Africa	Record of the Year	"Jerusalema"		Won	
2021	Global Music Awards Africa	Global Most Popular Song of the Year	"Jerusalema"		Nominated	
2024	SAMA30	Motsepe Foundation Record of the Year	"Dubula"		Pending	
2024	SAMA30	RAV Music Video of the Year	"Thula"		Pending	
2024	SAMA30	RAV Music Video of the Year	"Ngiyamthanda"		Pending	
2024	SAMA30	RAV Music Video of the Year	"Uthando Lwakho"		Pending	
2024	African Entertainment Awards USA	Music Producer of the Year	Himself		Won	
2024	African Entertainment Awards USA	Album of the Year	Himself	Nkosazana Daughter	Won	

== See also ==
- All Africa Music Awards
