= Special Allied Airborne Reconnaissance Force =

In late February 1945, when the defeat of Germany appeared imminent, the Supreme Headquarters Allied Expeditionary Force (SHAEF) was provided with a mandate for dispatching troops whose mission would be to secure the safety of Allied prisoners of war and to provide for their early evacuation. Early in 1945 SHAEF approached UK Director Military Operations (MO1 SP) and US OSS to assemble a force of 120 parachuteable contact and reconnaissance teams "to assist existing measures of relief for PW and after the collapse of GERMANY" - termed "Eclipse". The aim of these teams would be to:

- Obtain information regarding to the conditions inside PW camps
- Put PWs in touch with SHAEF via inserted radio sets
- Facilitate liaison with other SHAEF forces approaching camps or concentrations of PW and Foreign workers.

As a result of its mandate, SHAEF created, in March 1945, The Special Allied Airborne Reconnaissance Force, or SAARF.

== Headquarters ==
A golf course and its facilities at Wentworth, which formerly served as the Headquarters of the 21st Army Group, was allocated as SAARF's Headquarters and training camp. The Office of Strategic Services (OSS) (USA) and the Special Operations Executive (SOE) (UK) provided training and support personnel and, along with the First Allied Airborne Army, operational personnel. SAARF remained, however, under the control of the SHAEF.

== Personnel ==
=== Command ===
Brigadier John Sebastian Nichols, a British Army officer and veteran of the First World War, was selected to command, and Colonel Julian E. Raymond, an American, was appointed Deputy Commander.

=== Operational staff ===
The operational side was made up of an international group of people: 120 French, 96 British, 96 American, 30 Belgian, 30 Dutch, 10 from Luxembourgh and 18 Polish personnel, totaling 400 people. Many of the British and French personnel were drawn from special operations units, while the Polish people came from the Polish Independent Grenadier Company. Some British personnel also came from 1st Airborne Division and 6th Airborne Division.

The majority of the 96 Americans were drawn from the OSS and from elements of the 82nd and 101st Airborne Divisions. A small group, fewer than a half-dozen men each, came from the 11th Airborne Division, 13th Airborne Division and the 17th Airborne Division. One radio operator came to SAARF from the U.S. Navy. There were several women on staff who had served with distinction as SOE agents in Nazi-occupied Europe.

=== Teams ===
The basic operational unit of SAARF was a 3-person team that, with few exceptions, comprised two officers and an enlisted radio operator. All personnel had to be airborne qualified; those who were not were sent to the No.1 Parachute Training School RAF at Ringway, and refresher training was conducted by no 38 Group RAF.

Because the time available for training was limited, the personnel in each team were usually of the same nationality. Although the female personnel had established enviable records of bravery and daring in their previous assignments, it was decided early-on they would not be used in an airborne role. However, they were present on the unit's establishment as a ladies' auxiliary for other non-airborne duties more suitable for women.

== POW camps ==
In March 1945, the Allies crossed the Rhine and the collapse of Germany proceeded more rapidly than anticipated. On 21 April, in response to a request from the Belgian government, eight of the ten Belgian teams were dispatched to Brussels to be employed, in a ground role, by the various Army Groups to obtain early information regarding conditions in some POW camps.

A few days thereafter, SAARF was restructured: the 60 teams that had completed their training were retained in an airborne role while the remaining teams were re-designated air-transportable and were to use ground transportation, usually jeeps, in conducting their missions.

Conditions in the POW camps were believed to be poor and there was great uncertainty regarding Hitler's plan for a final stand. There were many scenarios for what the Germans might do with the POWs, and none was pleasant to contemplate. If the Germans abandoned the camps before the arrival of the Allied armies, the POWs would be threatened by starvation and disease and, perhaps, by random violence at the hands of the populace or the military.

Any effort to force march the POW population deeper into Germany and use them as hostages would result in the deaths of many. The willingness of the Germans to ignore the provisions of the Geneva Convention suggested even worse scenarios.

It was envisioned that the SAARF teams would drop near the POW camps, reconnoitre the situation, and report on conditions. Although it was thought unlikely that the teams could directly influence the movement of POWs, they could direct drops of food and medical supplies into the camps if conditions warranted.

=== Altengrabow (Operation: VIOLET) ===
VIOLET proved to be SAARF's only airborne operation: the balance of the units were air-transported to their assignments. SAARF teams were spread across northern Europe to assist local military governments in establishing radio links, in translation and interrogation, in monitoring the movement of German forces back to Germany, in screening the inmate populations of German prisons to determine who were political prisoners and who were criminals, and in searching for Nazis who had been identified as possible war criminals.

== Disbanding ==
SAARF was disbanded on 1 July 1945. A short-lived and secretive unit, most of the hardened veterans came from the airborne and special operations units. Some judgement has been made on the effectiveness of the SHAEF attempts to alleviate suffering of those interned by the Germans as the Nazi Reich collapsed.

== Insignia ==
The wing is silver-blue Schiffli embroidery on royal blue wool, sometimes on a black background; it terminates in a red arrow symbolically breaking the chains of oppression, which are embroidered in red. SAARF's non-American personnel usually wore the wing on the right shoulder, as a true SSI, while the Americans generally preferred to wear it near the right cuff in a fashion reminiscent of the pathfinder wing.

Because of its obscurity, the SAARF crest for many years escaped the attention of most collectors and few reproductions of the unit's insignia were to be found. This, however, is changing, as the unit and its insignia are exposed to more of the collecting public. SAARF insignia are one of the rarest Allied airborne insignia of the Second World War that were approved and issued.
