= Calais, South Africa =

Calais
- Location within Limpopo Location within South Africa
- Coordinates: 24.132°S 30.348°E
- Country: South Africa
- Province: Limpopo
- District: Mopani
- Municipality: Maruleng

Area
  - Total: 1.88 km^{2} (0.73 sq mi)

Population (2011)
  - Total: 2,484
  - Density: 1,320/km^{2} (3,420/sq mi)

Racial makeup (2011)
  - Black African: 99.6%
  - Other: 0.3%

First languages (2011)
  - Northern Sotho: 92.0%
  - Tsonga: 2.1%
  - English: 1.6%
  - Zulu: 1.5%
  - Other: 2.8%
- Time zone: UTC+2 (SAST)
- PO box: 0890

Calais is a village in Mopani District Municipality in the Limpopo province of South Africa.
