= Sho Madjozi =

South African artist (born 1992)

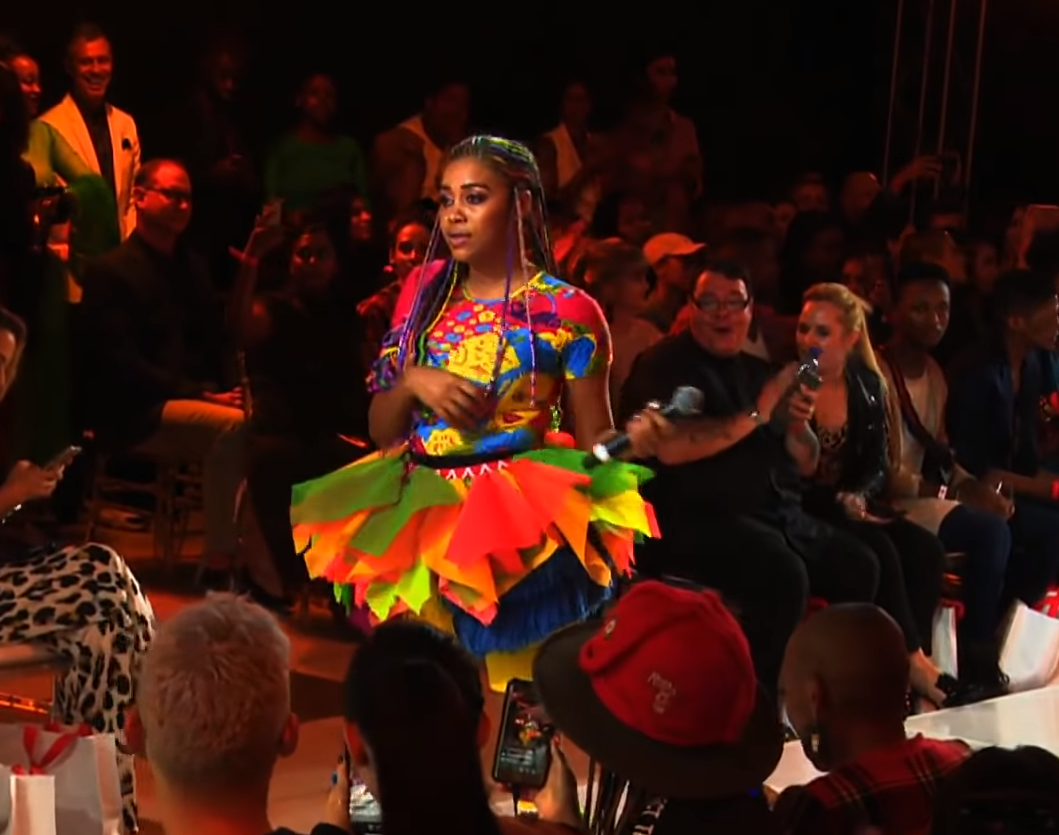
- Sho Madjozi performing at an Edgars Fashion Show in March 2019

Background information
- Also known as: MayaThePoet
- Born: Maya Christinah Xichavo Wegerif; 9 May 1992 (age 34); Limpopo, South Africa
- Genres: Gqom; afropop; hip hop
- Occupations: Rapper; singer; songwriter; poet
- Instrument: Vocals
- Years active: 2016–present
- Label: Epic
- Website: shomadjozi.com

Maya Christinah Xichavo Wegerif (born 9 May 1992), known professionally as Sho Madjozi (/ʃɒˈmɑːdjɔːrzɪ/ shoh-mah-JOH-zee), is a South African rapper, singer, songwriter, and poet. Madjozi incorporates the Tsonga culture through her music and public image. In 2019, Madjozi was named as one of Forbes Africa's 30 Under 30 for her contribution in the music and entertainment sector.

== Life and career ==
=== 1992–2016: Early life and beginnings ===
Madjozi was born on 9 May 1992 in Shirley Village, Elim, Limpopo, the daughter of Rosemary Phaweni and Marc Wegerif who ran a non-governmental organisation which was made to assist people with their land claims. Her mother is of African descent while her father is of European descent. After her parents divorced at an early age, she was mainly brought up by her mother. Madjozi has half-sisters from both her mother's and father's sides. As her father, Marc Wegerif, travelled regularly in particular regions of the continent, Madjozi had opportunities to travel with her father – she followed him to Dar es Salaam, Tanzania, where he worked for the charitable organisation Oxfam while she was a teenager. She also spent some time selling clothes at markets in Senegal during 2016 to provide for family.

After graduating high school at the International School of Tanganyika in Tanzania, Madjozi was offered a scholarship to Mount Holyoke College in South Hadley, Massachusetts, US, to study creative writing and African studies. While in the US, she started writing poems under the pen name of MayaThePoet. The poems were about politics, identity and race. Madjozi returned to South Africa, where she took up a fellowship in studying at the University of South Africa, Johannesburg, and also planned songwriting for other local artists. She began rapping and composing music under her stage name "Sho Madjozi". Madjozi rose to fame after her collaboration with rapper Okmalumkoolkat on the track "Ngiyashisa Bhe" and the hit single "Gqi".

=== 2017–present: Limpopo Champions League, What a Life ===
In April 2017, Madjozi made her television appearance as one of the casts of Mzansi Magic drama telenovela Isithembiso. She played Tsakane Mboweni – a character passionately involved in student politics – for the inaugural season.

Madjozi released her debut single, "Dumi HiPhone", featuring disc jockey duo PS DJz, on 28 April 2017, which was well received by the public. The song didn't make it to the final track listing on Madjozi's debut album. She also appeared on DJ Maphorisa BlaqBoy Music Presents Gqom Wave (2017), where she was featured on the track "Probleme". On 9 March 2018, she released the lead single "Huku" from her debut album. On 27 June 2018, Trace Urban South Africa announced their partnership with Madjozi, making her the ambassador for their mobile pre-paid provider TRACE Mobile. In August, Madjozi alongside singer Chris Martin announced and explained how the entry works of the Global Citizen Festival: Mandela 100, through a YouTube video uploaded by Global Citizen. Later on 2 December 2018, Sho Madjozi performed at the Global Citizen Festival: Mandela 100, which was headlined by Beyonce and Jay-Z.

Limpopo Champions League, Madjozi's debut studio album, was released on 14 December 2018. The album was also supported by the 5-minute short-film Trickshot composed by several tracks from the album. On 1 June 2019, Madjozi earned two wins at the 25th edition of South African Music Awards for Newcomer of the Year and for Best Female Album. She also received nominees for categories: Best Music Video for "Huku" and for Best Kwaito, Gqom & AmaPiano Album for Limpopo Champions League. As for 23 June 2019, Madjozi received a BET Award for Best New International Act at the BET Awards 2019.

In July 2019, Madjozi was named by the Forbes magazine amongst the 30 under 30 creatives category list for his contribution to the music and entertainment sector, the list featured other young African creatives like Nigerian musician Burna Boy, South African actress, TV and radio personality Thando Thabethe, Ghanaian contemporary artist Joseph Awuah-Darko, also known as Okuntakinte and Kenyan film director, producer and screenwriter Njue Kevin.

On 15 August 2019, Madjozi was featured on the global music platform COLORS, where she performed her song "John Cena" commonly named and inspired by professional wrestler John Cena. The gqom-genre song trended on regions, mainly in South Africa as it reached two-million views, which is a favourable success for the [COLOURS] music platform. Madjozi was praised for the song by many notable people, including rapper Missy Elliott, who retweeted her video on her Twitter page, whilst professional wrestler John Cena posted Madjozi on his Instagram account. She later released "John Cena" as an official single on 27 September 2019. On 7 November 2019, Madjozi appeared on The Kelly Clarkson Show to talk about the song. While performing as a guest, John Cena came from backstage to surprise her. The video of her reaction went viral, as she said it was a dream of hers to meet Cena himself.

At 4th ceremony of Mzansi Kwaito and House Music Awards, she won Best Gqom Artist award.

In July 2020, she was reportedly signed to U.S. label Epic Records.

On 27 November 2020, Madjozi first mixtape What a Life was released. It features Makhadzi and Dr Thomas Chauke.

On 22 November, 2022, Madjozi performed at Madison Square Garden, opening for Stromae.

== Public image ==
Madjozi incorporates Tsonga elements in her music and fashion. She commonly plays with the traditional wear. Madjozi usually performs the indigenous xibelani dance where she wears a skirt called a tinguvu. Besides her culture-influenced style, Madjozi dismisses a colourful image with many elements attached.

Madjozi is well known for her hairstyles influenced by Fulani and Tuareg women. The ethnic hairstyles influenced girls and women which became a trend mainly from her breakthrough year (2016) in South Africa and other regions. For her hair, she has been inspired by Boom Shaka and black American hairstyles. Discussing her hair, Majozi said "My braids represent Afro futurism. The question is: what would a globalised young African be if she was not interrupted by the horror of colonialism and apartheid? My braids are the answer."

In addition to her native Tsonga, Madjozi is also fluent in Swahili. Her songs incorporate both languages as well as English.

== Awards and nominations ==
| Year | Award Ceremony | Prize | Work/Recipient | Result |
|---|---|---|---|---|
| 2019 | South African Music Awards | Female Artist of the Year | Limpopo Champions League | Won |
| 2019 | South African Music Awards | Best Newcomer | Herself | Won |
| 2019 | South African Music Awards | Best Music Video | "Huku" | Nominated |
| 2019 | South African Music Awards | Best Kwaito, Gqom or Amapiano Album | Limpopo Champions League | Nominated |
| 2019 | AFRIMA | Best Newcomer | Herself | Nominated |
| 2019 | AFRIMA | Best Female Southern Africa | Herself | Nominated |
| 2019 | AFRIMA | AFRIMA Video of The Year | "Idhom" | Nominated |
| 2019 | BET Awards | Best New International Act | Herself | Won |
| 2019 | African Talent Awards | Best African Song of the Year | "John Cena" | Nominated |
| 2019 | 4th Mzansi Kwaito and House Music Awards | Best Gqom Artist | Herself | Won |
| 2020 | BET Awards | Best International Act | Herself | Nominated |
| 2020 | Nickelodeon Kids' Choice Awards | Favorite Global Music Star | Herself | Nominated |
| 2020 | Nickelodeon Kids' Choice Awards | Favorite Star (Africa) | Herself | Won |
| 2020 | 2020 African Entertainment Awards USA | Best Female Artist | Herself | Nominated |
| 2020 | 2020 African Entertainment Awards USA | Best Hip hop/Rap | Herself | Nominated |
| 2021 | South African Music Award | Female Artist of the Year | What A Life | Won |
| 2021 | South African Music Award | Best Traditional Music Album | What A Life | Won |
| 2021 | MTV Africa Music Award | Best Female Act | Herself | Pending |

== Discography ==
=== Studio album ===
| Title | Album details |
|---|---|
| Limpopo Champions League | Released: 14 December 2018; Label: Flourish and Multiply; Formats: CD, digital download |

=== Singles ===
| Title | Details | Certifications | Album |
|---|---|---|---|
| "Dumi HiPhone" (with PS DJz) | Released: 28 April 2017; Format: Digital download | — | Non-album single |
| "Huku" | Released: 9 March 2018; Format: Digital download | RiSA: Platinum | Limpopo Champions League |
| "Wakanda Forever" | Released: 30 November 2018; Format: Digital download | RiSA: Gold | Limpopo Champions League |
| "Idhom" | Released: 2 June 2019; Format: Digital download | — | Limpopo Champions League |
| "John Cena" | Released: 27 September 2019; Format: Digital download | — | Non-album single |
| "Kona" | Released: 16 December 2019; Format: Digital download | — | Limpopo Champions League |

=== Promotional singles ===
| Title | Details | Album |
|---|---|---|
| "Don't Tell Me What To Do" | Format: Digital download | Limpopo Champions League |
