= South African Audience Research Foundation =

Research organization

SAARF
- Founded: December 4, 1974
- Purpose: Direct and publish media audience and product/brand research
- Location: Bryanston, Gauteng (City of Johannesburg Metropolitan Municipality), South Africa
- Website: saarf.co.za
- Formerly called: South African Advertising Research Foundation

The South African Audience Research Foundation (SAARF) is a non-profit organisation which publishes media audience and product/brand research on traditional media.

It was formerly known as the South African Advertising Research Foundation (following a name change in 2012).

It is primarily known for its research surveys AMPS, RAMS and TAMS in addition to other products such as SAARF Development Index and the SAARF Universal Living Standards Measure (LSMs).

== History ==
- 1973 (24 October): Formation of SAARF (South African Advertising Research Foundation) announced.
- 1974 (4 December): Formally established.
- 1975 (January): Operations began.
- 1975: First research report, SAARF AMPS 1975 (a joint venture with the National Readership Survey).
- 1985: Casper Venter (first General Manager of SAARF) retires. Gert Yssel (formerly Deputy Director General of the SABC) steps in to fill the position.
- 1987: Outdoor was included in AMPS for the first time (was measured again in 1988, 1991 & 1995).
- 1980s (Mid): MARST (Marketing and Advertising Research and Standards Trust) was conceived, to handle the collection of the levy and distribute to ASA (Advertising Standards Authority) and SAARF.
- 1990 (31 January): MARST is formed.
- 1992 (November): MARST is terminated.
- 1996: A new MD of SAARF is appointed, Mike Gorton, who was tasked with a strategic review of SAARF's budget and future plans.
- 2000: SAARF increased the scope of its activities after it conducted strategic reviews to find out what the Industry wanted.
- 2012 (May): SAARF started using IHS Global Insight Regional eXplorer suite of models for their population estimates (previously used Bureau of Market Research of UNISA (BMR)).
- 2012 (July): Name changed to "South African Audience Research Foundation".
- 2013 (June): NAB gives notice of its resignation from SAARF (effective 31 December 2014).
- 2013 (June): Clare O’Neill (chairman) withdrew from the board after SAARF Annual General Meeting (AGM).

== Surveys ==
The surveys are done by Nielsen on behalf of SAARF.

- All Media and Products Survey (AMPS): covers the total population of South Africa that is at least 15 years of age (prior to 2009, the survey covered persons 16 years and older). Interviewers with laptops do in-home interviews using Double Screen - Computer Assisted Personal Interviewing (DS-CAPI). The AMPS data is released twice a year, based on 12-month rolling data.
- Radio Audience Measurement Survey (RAMS): At the end of the above mentioned interview, a RAMS diary (containing a list of radio stations in South Africa) is left with the respondent for a week so as to gain radio listenership. The RAMS data is released six times a year, based on period-on-period as well as year-on-year data.
- Television Audience Measurement Survey (TAMS).

== AMPS Features ==
Sample Size of Survey (per annum)
	Sample Size	Urban	Rural
1975	16 634		
1985	22 474		
1995	14 643		
2002	29 791	24 616	5 175
2005	24 412	20 412	4 000
2013	25 108	21 112	3 996

Number of items covered in AMPS
	AMPS 1975	AMPS 1985	AMPS 1995	AMPS 2010B	AMPS 2011B	AMPS 2012B	AMPS 2013B
Newspapers	45	36	41	52	53	55	
Daily Newspapers	22	19	17	21	22	23	
Weekly Newspapers	23	17	24	28	28	29	
Bi-Weekly	-	-	-	1	1	1	
Monthly Newspapers	-	-	-	2	1	2	
Supplements	0	0	40	127	133	129	
Magazines	34	35	44	162	148	146	
Radio Stations	9	18	28	187	205	228	240
TV Channels	0	4	6	159	171	167	
TV Terrestrial	0	4	6				
TV Satellite	0	0	0				

== See also ==
- List of newspapers in South Africa
- List of magazines in South Africa
- List of radio stations in South Africa
