= Makhadzi =

Venda title

A makhadzi is the senior paternal aunt (father's sister) of a Venda ruler or family head; the makhadzi of a ruler was and is the most powerful woman in Venda society. The senior sister of a family head or ruler is called khadzi, and becomes makhadzi to the successor. They play important roles in a ruler's succession, dispute resolution, girls' initiations, and religious ceremonies.

When a ruler died, it was up to the makhadzi and the khosimunene (senior brother of the deceased ruler) to decide on a successor, and appoint the successor's khadzi and ndumi (senior brother and assistant ruler, usually khosimunene to the next successor). The makhadzi also advised on policy decisions, and was believed to have close relations with powerful ancestral spirits (believed to be able to affect the present). A makhadzi led familial rituals which involved libation and prayers to ancestors; for the royal makhadzi these were often public. Other roles include adjudicating on familial disputes, determining their family's marriages, and leading girls' initiation schools (musevhetho, vhusha, domba, and tshikanda). In the Venda Kingdom, makhadzi also took care of leaders' protective charms.
