= Makhadzi (singer) =

South African singer

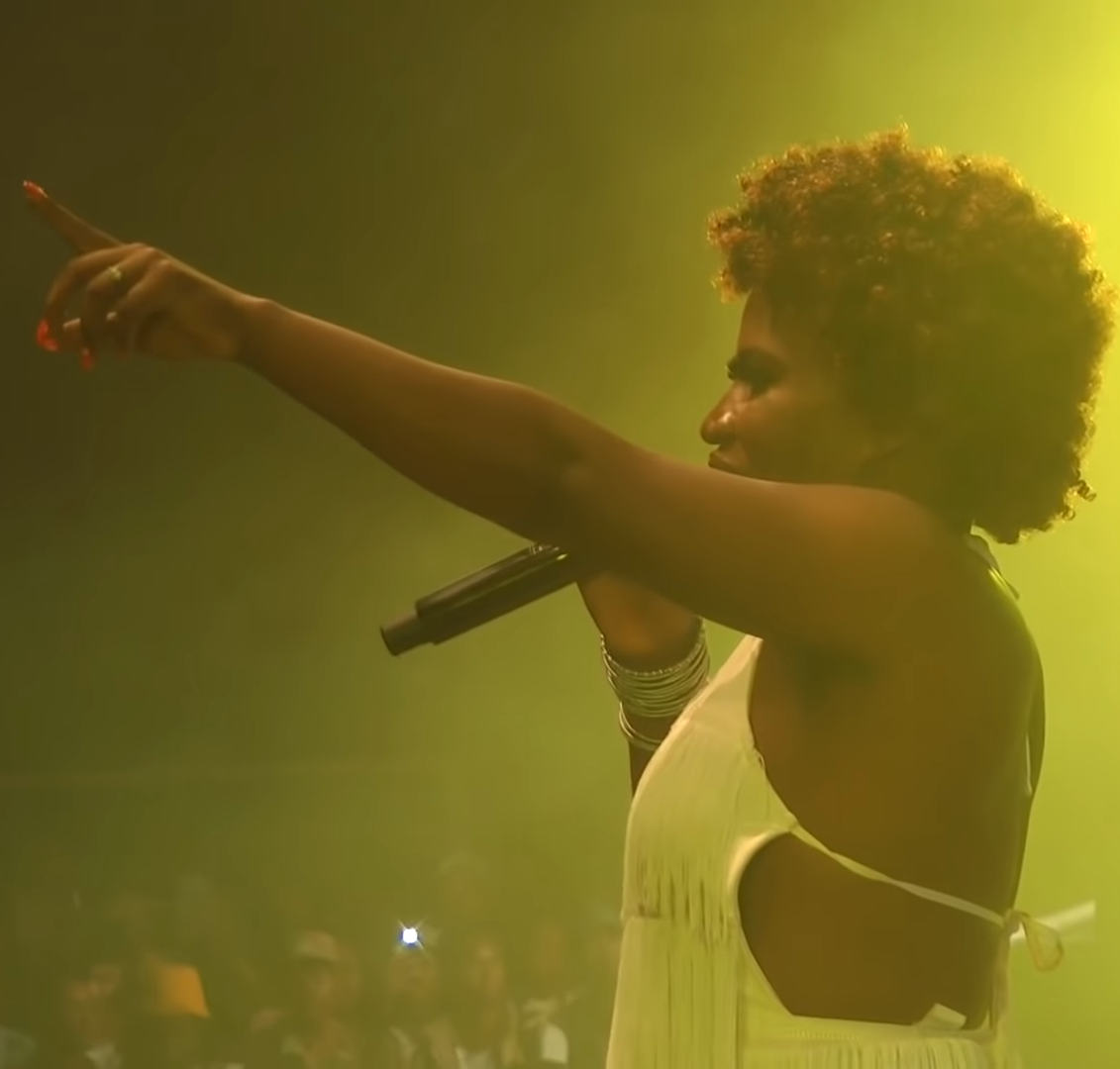
- Makhadzi in 2020

Background information
- Also known as: Makhadzi
- Born: Ndivhudzannyi Ralivhona; 30 June 1996 (age 30); Limpopo
- Origin: Limpopo, Ha Mashamba
- Genre: Dance/Venda Pop
- Occupations: Singer; songwriter; dancer
- Years active: 2005–present
- Labels: Black Skopion Music (former); Rita Dee Entertainment (former); Open Mic Productions (former); Makhadzi Entertainment (current)

Ndivhudzannyi Ralivhona (born 30 June 1996), known by her stage name Makhadzi, is a South African singer, songwriter and dancer. Born and raised in Ha-Mashamba, Limpopo, her career began at the age of 12 as dancer prior to pursuing a music career as a singer, while she was attending school she signed a record deal with Rita Dee Entertainment and released Muhwalo Uya Ndemela in 2015. She garnered local attention after her single "Tshanda Vhuya" released in 2017. Her second studio album Matorokisi (2019), debuted at number two in South Africa.

Makhadzi's third studio album Kokovha (2020), became one of her biggest successes and debuted at number one on the South African iTunes albums charts. It contained the chart-topping singles "Amadoda", "Mphemphe", "Kokovha" and "Tshikwama".

Her fourth studio album African Queen (2021) was certified gold in South Africa.

Makhadzi's fifth studio album African Queen 2.0 (2022), reached number one in South Africa.

== Early life ==
Makhadzi was born in a small village called Ha-Mashamba Tshivhangani, just outside Elim in Limpopo province. After her parents separated, Ndivhudzannyi and her two siblings had to stay with their mother. She completed her grade 12 at Mukula Integrated School. Ndivhudzannyi obtained her qualification in Public Relations and she is currently studying drama.

== Music career ==
Her career started at the age of 13, where she used to perform at Taxi ranks, getting money from people's offerings. In 2010, Makhadzi joined a musical group Makhirikhiri as a dancer.

Shortly after she left dancing, she began working on her music career. Makhadzi independently released three studio albums Muvhango (2009), Ndo Tshinya Ni? (2011) and Litshani u Ntsala Murahu (2012).

On 1 December 2014 her fourth studio album Rita Dee was released.

In 2015, she attracted the attention of Rita Dee Entertainment and got signed a record deal, followed by the release of her album Muhwalo Uya Ndemela.

The following year she released her album Yo Shoma in 2017. The album scooped two awards for Best Female Artist and Tshivenda Best at Fame South African Music Awards.

Shumela Venda was released in 2017. It was supported by two singles "Dj Wa Vhorine" and "Tshanda Vhuya".

=== 2019–2020: Matorokisi, Kokovha ===
Makhadzi's breakthrough single "Matorokisi featuring DJ Call " was released in 2019, became one biggest song of her career.

Her studio album Matorokisi was released on 1 November 2019. The album peaked at number 2 on local iTunes/Apple Music South Africa and remained in the Top 5 for three days.

In 2019, Makhadzi was featured by Master KG on a song titled "Tshikwama", released off the album Jerusalema.

After she left Rita Dee Entertainment, Makhadzi bagged a record deal with Open Mic Productions.

On 16 October 2020, Makhadzi studio album Kokovha, was released in South Africa. The album features Mayten, Mampintsha, Prince Benza, Mr Brown, Gigi Lamayne, Jah Prayzah, Team Mosha, Moonchild Sanelly, FB, Charma Girl and Sho Madjozi. As of August 2021, her album was named the most stream on Apple Music. The album was certified with gold plaque.

=== 2021–2022: African Queen, Pain Ya Jealous, African Queen 2.0 ===
On 5 April 2021, Makhadzi released a single "Mjolo" featuring Mlindo the Vocalist. The song peaked number 28 on South Africa iTunes charts.

Her single "Ghanama" featuring Prince Benza, and King Monada was released on 7 July 2021. The song was certified platinum in South Africa.

On 16 August she announced her album African Queen and release date on her Twitter. That same month she also released her single "Tchukutsha" featuring Lady Du on 7 August 2021.

On 6 August Kabza De Small teased a collaboration single "Salungano" with Makhadzi on YouTube, which was released on 2 September 2021.

Her studio album African Queen, was released on 3 September 2021. The album features Cassper Nyovest, Kabza De Small and Lady Du.

At the 6th ceremony of All Africa Music Awards, she received a nomination for Best Female Artist in South Africa.

Pain Ya Jealous was released on 31 March 2022. The EP was certified Gold in South Africa.

Makhadzi announced working on her next studio album African Queen 2.0 on 17 October, captioned "#albumloading" over 30 songs were recorded throughout from early January to October.

Her fifth studio album was set to be released on 4 November, but postponed to 18 November 2022. It features Blaq Diamond, Big Zulu, Penny Penny, Yaba Buluku Boyz, Mr Brown. It reached number one in Botswana.

=== 2023–present: Mbofholowo, Miracle Child, upcoming album ===
In early May 2023, Makhadzi left her former record label Open Mic Production.

Following departure with her former label, Makhadzi established her own record label Makhadzi Entertainment and began to work on her sixth studio album Mbofholowo.

The album was released on 1 September 2023. The album amassed one million streams on Apple Music, two days after its release. In addition, Mbofholowo was certified platinum in South Africa.

In early September 2023, Makhadzi was announced as Spotify's Equal ambassador.

"Number 1" featuring Iyanya, and Prince Benza was released 10 May 2024. The song debuted number 9 on The Official South African Charts. It was certified two-times platinum in South Africa within two months.

Makhadzi won Dance Artist of the Year and International Achievement of the Year at the 2024 Basadi in Music Awards.

Towards the end of August 2024, Makhadzi announced her upcoming album Miracles Child to be released on October 7.

== Business ventures ==
In December 2021, Makhadzi launched Kokovha brand in collaboration with Kicks Sportwear at Mall of Africa.

In March 2022, she launched her body lotion brands Mavoda.

== Discography ==
=== Studio albums ===
- Shumela Venda (2019)
- Matorokisi (2019)
- Kokovha (2020)
- African Queen (2021)
- African Queen 2.0 (2022)
- Mbofholowo (2023)
- Miracle Child (2024)
- Sesi Ka Rose (2025)

=== EPs ===
- Pain Ya Jealous (2022)
- Win is a Win (2025)
- "BIG 30 Episode 1" (2026)
- "BIG 30 Episode 2 : Tsotsi" (2026)

== Television ==
In 2018, Makhadzi was hosted on Yo TV for her first television performance. She has since conducted interviews with various radio stations, including Munghana Lonene FM, Phalaphala FM, Nzhelele FM, Makhado FM, Sloot FM, and Capricorn FM, where she spoke about her music, life and her hardships. She also appeared on The Morning Show on ETV. Makhadzi was one of the performers at the 2020 DSTV Mzansi Viewers Choice Awards. Her performance was hailed as one of the best performances of the night on social media.

== Awards and nominations ==
Year	Award	Category	Result	Ref.
2017	LMAC	Best Tshivenda hit	Won	
2018	TSHIMA awards	Best Tshivenda Dance Artist/Album of the Year	Nominated	
2018	TSHIMA awards	Female Artist of the Year	Nominated	
2018	TSHIMA awards	Tshivenda Song of the Year	Nominated	
2018	TSHIMA awards	Best Tshivenda Artist of the Year	Nominated	
2019	Tshivenda Music Awards	Song of the Year ("Tshikwama")	Won	
2019	Tshivenda Music Awards	Artist of the Year	Won	
2021	Mzansi Kwaito & House Music Awards	Best Music Video	Nominated	
2021	AFRIMA	Best Artist, Duo or Group	Won	
2022	Nickelodeon Kids’ Choice Awards	Favourite African Star	Won	
2022	Mzansi Viewers Choice Awards	Favourite Personality	Nominated	
2022	Mzansi Viewers Choice Awards	Favourite Music artist/Group	Won	
2022	Mzansi Viewers Choice Awards	Favourite Song	Won	
2022	Basadi in Music Awards	Song of the Year	Nominated	
2022	Basadi in Music Awards	Artist of the Year	Won	
2022	South African Music Awards	Music Video of the Year ("Ghanama" featuring Prince Benza)	Won	
2022	South African Music Awards	Best Collaboration ("Zwivhuya" featuring Joe Delinger)	Nominated	
2023	Metro FM Music Awards	Best Female Artist (African Queen 2.0)	Won	
2023	Basadi in Music Awards	Artist of the Year	Nominated	
2023	South African Music Awards	Best Traditional Album (African Queen 2.0)	Won	
2024	BET Awards	Best New International Act	Won	
2024	Basadi in Music Awards	Songwriter of the Year	Nominated	
2024	Basadi in Music Awards	Dance Artist of the Year	Won	
2024	Basadi in Music Awards	Artist of the Year	Nominated	
2024	Basadi in Music Awards	International Achievement Award	Won	
2024	South African Music Awards	Best Traditional Music Album	Nominated	
2024	African Entertainment Awards USA	Best Female Artist	Nominated	
2024	Trace Awards	Best Female Artist	Nominated	
2024	Trace Awards	Best Dancer of the Year	Won	
2025	Basadi in Music Awards	Sofnfree Artist of the Year	Nominated	
2025	Basadi in Music Awards	Dance Artist of the Year	Nominated	
