= Greatest Hits: The Queen of African Pop (1964–2004) =

Greatest hits album by Brenda Fassie
- Released: 30 November 2004
- Recorded: 1983–2003
- Genre: Kwaito; Afro-pop
- Label: EMI Music Distribution
- Producer: Sello "Chicco" Twala

Greatest Hits: The Queen of African Pop (1964–2004) is a posthumous greatest hits album by South African Afro-pop singer Brenda Fassie. The album was released on November 30, 2004 via EMI Music Distribution.

== Background ==
Fassie died aged 39 on 9 May 2004, in hospital in Sunninghill without returning to consciousness after her life support machines were turned off following an asthma attack which led to cardio-respiratory arrest and subsequent brain damage.

The album was released months after her death. The album features a selection of Fassie's greatest hits including "Weekend Special", "Vulindlela", "Black President" and more from previous albums. The album also includes notes written by her son Bongani "Bongz" Fassie.

EMI donated the sales of the album to the Nelson Mandela HIV/AIDS 46664 foundation to help improve the lives of those infected and affected by the disease all over Africa.

== Critical reception ==
Professional ratings
Review scores
Source	Rating
AllMusic	4/5 stars
channel 24	4/5 stars

In a positive review for AllMusic, Wade Kergan said, "Brenda Fassie's best-known song is the Afro-pop R&B crossover "Weekend Special," which introduced her strong voice and polished productions to the world outside of her South African home. It wasn't an overnight success, though. "Weekend Special" was recorded in 1983 and slowly gained momentum until it finally snuck into the Billboard charts in 1986, opening doors to world tours and a seat among the elite of Afro-pop. Along with other tracks from her original rise to Afro-pop fame like "No No No Senor" and "Higher & Higher," "Weekend Special" was almost indistinguishable from other pop-soul of the era, much more Whitney Houston than Miriam Makeba. The highlights of this greatest-hits collection, and Fassie's career as a whole, are the high-tech kwaito fusions of South African vocals with studio-crisp worldbeat bump heard on '90s comeback tracks like "Vulindlela", "Nomakanjani" and "Thola Madlozi". Here was a singer, matured by her previous ride on the pop music roller coaster as well as her well-publicized hardships, who bounced back with music bursting with a warmth and vitality both traditional and modern. A balanced collection that provides ample evidence of why Brenda Fassie was called the Queen of African Pop".

A News 24 writer said this about the album "This Greatest Hits is a pop party album for Africa. Which means it's also about things that matter to us. The songs - most of which Fassie had a hand in writing - are upbeat, rousing, designed to make you dance. But as fun as they are to move to they're always about more than partying...."

== Track listing ==
Greatest Hits: The Queen of African Pop (1964–2004) track listing
No.	Title	Length
1.	"Vul'Indela"	3:26
2.	"Weekend Special"	3:52
3.	"Nomakanjani"	3:40
4.	"No No No Senor"	3:30
5.	"I Straight Lendaba"	3:53
6.	"Higher & Higher"	4:22
7.	"Too Late for Mama"	3:57
8.	"Boipatong"	4:04
9.	"Sum'Bulalala"	3:23
10.	"Black President"	4:26
11.	"Thola Madlozi"	3:20
12.	"Ngeke Umconfirm"	4:16
13.	"Promises"	3:56
14.	"Zola Budd"	4:00
15.	"Amalahle"	3:51
16.	"Umuntu Ngumuntu Ngabantu"	3:40
17.	"Touch Somebody"	3:42
18.	"Amagents"	3:28
19.	"It's Nice to Be with People"	2:03
20.	"Kuyoze Kuyovalwa"	3:54
Total length:		49:19

== Personnel ==
Credits adapted from AllMusic.

Primary artist

- Brenda Fassie

Producer

- Neal Snyman
- Maiko Watson
- Sello Chicco Twala
