= Mama (Brenda Fassie album) =

Studio album by Brenda Fassie
- Released: June 14, 1993
- Genre: Afropop
- Length: 53:51
- Label: CCP Records Celluloid Records
- Producer: Brenda Fassie

Brenda Fassie chronology
Yo Baby (1992)	Mama (1993)	Abantu Bayakhuluma (1994)

Mama is the eleventh studio album by South African singer Brenda Fassie. Released on November 4, 1993, by CCP Records, the album went on to sell over 100,000 units in South Africa by mid-1994.

The album is most notable for Fassie's acclaimed single "Mama". In the song, Fassie paid tribute to her mother Sarah Fassie, who died earlier that year. The album also has the hit single "Ama-Gents", which is a diss track directed at Senyaka. Senyaka first dissed Fassie on his song "Uzonda Magents" because she was publicly dating a woman.

== Critical reception ==
Professional ratings
Review scores
Source	Rating
AllMusic	2.3/5 stars

Steve Huey of AllMusic said "Mama is another collection of Soweto township jive from Brenda Fassie; it includes her hit "Ama-Gents."

== Track listing ==
Adapted from

No.	Title	Writer(s)	Length
1.	"Ama-Gents"	Brenda Fassie	4:41
2.	"Siyajola"	Brenda Fassie	4:41
3.	"Higher And Higher"	Fassie M. Watson R. Klass	4:45
4.	"Mama"	Fassie	4:28
5.	"Lonely"	Brenda Fassie	4:09
6.	"Ama-Gents - (Hip-Hop mix)"	Fassie	4:33

== Personnel ==
- Brenda Fassie - Lead Artist
- S. Shandel - Producer
