= Now Is the Time (Brenda Fassie album) =

Now Is The Time

Studio album by Brenda Fassie
- Released: August 4, 1996
- Genres: Afropop; Kwaito
- Length: 53:02
- Label: CCP Records
- Producers: Brenda Fassie (exec.); Sello Chicco Twala

Brenda Fassie chronology
Umuntu uyashintsha (1995)	Now Is The Time (1996)	Paparazzi (1997)

Now Is the Time is the eleventh studio album by South African singer Brenda Fassie. Released on August 4, 1996, by CCP Records, this is her eleventh album for the label. Now Is The Time features two duets with Congolese superstar Papa Wemba.

The album primarily incorporates Kwaito, gospel and Afropop music elements with lyrical themes of music industry experience and Fassie's faith in God.

== Background ==
During the 1990s, Fassie's life went into a downward spiral after her divorce from Nhlanhla Mbambo, and for years she checked in and out of drug rehabilitation clinics, and missed gigs. Following year 1996, opting to re-establish her music career, Fassie made her comeback producing her own the album and planning the project. She collaborated with her long time producer Sello Chicco Twala. The album represents a departure from the Afropop music of Fassie's previous albums; Fassie's genre shift came after Kwaito was becoming a popular genre in South Africa. Now is the time was released in 1996 by CCP Music in its physical form. EMI Digital re-released the album in its digital form in 2015 on the music streaming services like Spotify and the iTunes Store.

== Track listing ==
No.	Title	Writer(s)	Length
1.	"Uwile"	B.Fassie; J. Kamela; P. Sibeko; Stargo	4:31
2.	"Kutheni"	Fassie; Stargo; T. Maribatsi	5:02
3.	"Se pasta"	Fassie J. Kamela	3:42
4.	"Ngiyakuthanda Papa Wemba Featuring (Papa Wemba)"	Fassie; Mica; Papa Wemba	3:57
5.	"Antique"	Fassie; J. Kamela; Stargo	4:55
6.	"Kiriya"	Fassie	5:00
7.	"Tonight Is the Night"	Betty Wright	5:07
8.	"Mina Ngithanda"	Fassie; J. Kamela; P. Sibeko	5:44
9.	"Poppy"	Fassie	3:10
10.	"No Yana"	Fassie; J. Kamela; Stargo	4:40
11.	"Rastafaria"	Fassie J. Kamela	5:11
Total length:			53:02

Notes

- "Tonight Is the Night" contains a sample of "Tonight Is the Night", written by Willie Clarke performed by Betty Wright.

== Personnel ==
- Brenda Fassie – Vocals, producer
- Papa Wemba – main vocals (track 4)

== Release history ==
Region	Date	Format	Label
Various	August 4, 1996	CD	CCP Records
Various	2015	Digital download; streaming	CCP Records
