= Weekend Special (album) =

Studio album by Brenda and the Big Dudes
- Released: 1983
- Recorded: 1983
- Length: 30:37
- Label: CCP Records
- Producer: Mally Watson, Blondie Makhene

Brenda and the Big Dudes chronology
Weekend Special (1983)	Cool Spot (EP) (1984)

Singles from Weekend Special
- 1. "Weekend Special" Released: 1983

Weekend Special is the debut studio album released by Brenda and the Big Dudes on the CCP Records label in 1983. It was produced by Mally Watson and Blondie Makhene. Weekend Special spawned two singles "Weekend Special" and "You Just Need Someone". The album sold over 200 000 copies in South Africa by the end of 1984.

== Background ==
In 1980, one of the singers from the group Joy fell pregnant (Anneline Malebo) went on maternity leave. Fassie who lived with producer Hendrick "Koloi" Lebona at the time, was called by Joy's management to stand in for Malebo. Following the return of Malebo, Fassie left the band and joined Blondie and Papa [Makhene] as a backup singer before starting her own band, Brenda and the Big Dudes, which is composed of Desmond Malotana (keyboards), Dumisane Ngubeni (keyboards), Job "Fats" Mlangeni (drums), David Mabaso (bass), Rufus Klaas (guitar) and Fassie (vocals).

== Tracklist ==
Adapted from Allmusic

Weekend Special – Disc one (Audio)
No.	Title	Writer(s)	Producer(s)	Length
1.	"Weekend Special"	Melvyn Matthews; Desmond Molotana; Dumisani Ngubeni	Mally Watson	4:45
2.	"I Wanna Be Single"	D. Mabaso; David Mabaso	Mally Watson	4:21
3.	"Gimme Gimme Your Love"	R. Klaas; Rufus Klass	Mally Watson	5:00
4.	"If I Hurt You Little Boy"	Desmond Malotana	Mally Watson	5:06
5.	"Bongani"	David Ngubeni; Dumisani Ngubeni	Mally Watson	5:25
6.	"Touch Somebody"	R. Klaas; Rufus Klass	Mally Watson	4:37
7.	"Can't Stop This Feeling"	Desmond Malotana	Mally Watson	3:58
8.	"It's Nice to Be With People"	Desmond Malotana	Mally Watson	5:23
Total length:				45:42

== Personnel ==
'Brenda and the Big Dudes'

- Brenda Fassie - Vocals, Composer
- Desmond Malotana - (Keyboards) *Dumisane Ngubeni - (Keyboards)
- Job "Fats" Mlangeni - (Drums),
- David Mabaso - (Bass)
- Rufus Klaas - (Guitar)

'Additional personnel'

- Hugo Dwyer - Engineer, Mixing
- Wayne Edwards *Executive Producer
- Van Gibbs - Arranger, Emulator, Producer, Remixing, Synthesizer
- Franklin Grant - Engineer
- Blondie Makhene - Producer (track 1)
- Nicky Marrero - Timbales
- Billy Miranda - Assistant Engineer
- Cirland Noel - Assistant Engineer
- Jerome Najee Rasheed - Sax (Alto)
- Jose Rodrigues - Mastering
- Bob Bachman - Edited By
- V. Jeffrey Smith - Sax (Tenor), Soloist
- Akili Walker - Engineer
- Tom Weber - Engineer
