= Mina Nawe =

Studio album by Brenda Fassie
- Released: November 2, 2001
- Recorded: 2000–2001
- Genre: Afropop; Kwaito
- Label: CCP Records; EMI
- Producer: Sello Chicco

Brenda Fassie chronology
Thola Amadlozi (2000)	Mina Nawe (2001)	Myekeleni (2002)

Mina Nawe is the sixteenth studio album by South African singer Brenda Fassie. The record was released on November 2, 2001, by CCP Records. Fassie wrote most of the album's songs with Sello Chicco Twala.

Originally released by CCP Records, the album was reissued on CD in 2002, EMI in 2009 re-released the album in its digital form. The album was also the best-selling album of 2001, according to the Recording Industry of South Africa (RISA). The album sold close to 350,000 copies in South Africa in 2002.

== Commercial performance ==
Mina Nawe becoming the best-selling album of 2001, and was certified platinum by the Recording Industry of South Africa (RISA).

== Accolades ==
Among its accolades, it won Best Selling Release at the 8th South African Music Awards (SAMA), with Fassie becoming the first female artist to win in the category three times.

=== SAMA ===
Awards
Year	Organization	Award	Result	Ref.
2000	8th South African Music Awards	Best Selling Album	Won	

== Track listing ==
Credits adapted from All Music.

No.	Title	Writer(s)	Length
1.	"Ngohlala Ngi Nje"	Brenda Fassie; Sello Twala	4:58
2.	"Wewe (African Wedding)"	Fassie; Twala	4:48
3.	"Vuma"	Fassie; Twala	3:49
4.	"Lekwaito"	Fassie; Twala	4:23
5.	"Ubani Ozokufa?"	Fassie; Twala	4:02
6.	"Uyang'embarasa"	Fassie; Twala	4:50
7.	"Ngohlala Nginje"	Fassie; Twala	4:26
8.	"Wewe" (Remix)	Fassie; Twala	4:28
9.	"Ngik' Tholile"	Fassie; Twala	5:03
10.	"Life Is Going On"	Melvyn Matthews; Dumisani Ngubeni	4:36
Total length:			45:23

== Personnel ==
- Brenda Fassie - Musician, producer, writer (track 1-9)
- Sello Chicco Twala - Engineer, Instruments, producer
- Melvyn Matthews - writer (track 10)
- Mally Watson - producer (track 10)
- Dumisani Ngubeni - writer (track 10)
- Longwe Twala - Instrument (track 1,2,4 & 7,9)
