= Nomakanjani =

1999 studio album by Brenda Fassie

Studio album by Brenda Fassie
- Released: November 17, 1999
- Genres: Afro-pop; Kwaito
- Length: 47:17
- Label: CCP Records
- Producer: Brenda Fassie Sello Twala

Brenda Fassie chronology
Memeza (1998)	Nomakanjani (1999)	Thola Amadlozi (2000)

Singles from Nomakanjani
- 1. "Nomakanjani" Released: 1999

Nomakanjani is the fourteenth studio album by South African singer Brenda Fassie, released on 15 November 1999 by CCP Records and EMI Records.The production on Nomakanjani incorporated the use of kwaito elements and Afropop. On the project Brenda Fassie worked with her long time producer Sello "Chicco" Twala and T. Dhladhla.

The album was a massive commercial success, it sold 350,000 copies in South Africa. Nomakanjani received the best-selling album award and Song of the Year at the South African Music Awards.

== Track listing ==
No.	Title	Writer(s)	Length
1.	"Nomakanjani"	Twala	4:44
2.	"Jiva"	Twala	5:06
3.	"Moya"	Twala	4:07
4.	"Mpundulu"	B. Fassie; Twala	4:34
5.	"Mingi Mingi"	Fassie; Twala	4:53
6.	"Kenang Bohle"	Twala	4:57
7.	"Nomakanjani (Come What May Mix)"	S. Twala	5:44
8.	"Soon And Very Soon (99 Remix)"	Andraé Crouch; Twala	4:35
9.	"Mpundulu (Gruff Mix)"	B. Fassie; Twala	4:43
10.	"Jiva (Sparse Vocal Mix)"	Twala	4:49
Total length:			53:02

- "Soon And Very Soon" is written by Andraé Crouch and performed by Andraé Crouch.

== Accolades ==
Awards
Year
Organization
Award
Result
Ref.
2000
6th South African Music Awards
Best Selling Album
Won

(won Best Selling Album)

200

|}

== Personnel ==
Credit from AllMusic

- Brenda Fassie - Composer, Primary Artist
- Sello "Chicco" Twala - Arranger, Composer, Engineer, Producer
- T. Dhladhla - Engineer
- Mark Morrison - Photography
