= Amadlozi (album) =

Thola Amadlozi

Studio album by Brenda Fassie
- Released: 2000
- Recorded: 2000
- Studio: Chicco Studios
- Genre: Afro-pop
- Length: 37:56
- Label: CCP Records
- Producer: Sello Chicco Twala

Brenda Fassie chronology
Nomakanjani (1999)	Thola Amadlozi (2000)	Mina Nawe (2001)

Thola Amadlozi is the fifteenth studio album recorded by South African singer Brenda Fassie and produced by Sello Chicco Twala. The album continued her trend of incorporating Afro-pop, Pop and Kwaito. The album sold over 350,000 copies in South Africa and won the Best Selling Album of the Year award at 2001 South African Music Awards.

== Background ==
Thola Amadlozi was released in 2000 by CCP Records. On 20 October 2009, the album was re-released by EMI Music South Africa (Pty) in digital. The album was accompanied by the release of a music video of the same name.

== Track listing ==
No.	Title	Writer(s)	Length
1.	"Thola Amadloziozi"	B. Fassie; Twala	4:16
2.	"Nakupenda (I Love You)"	Twala	4:37
3.	"Monate"	Twala	4:54
4.	"Ngizobuya"	Twala	4:04
5.	"Monate" (Kwaito Remix)	Twala	5:11
6.	"Oxamu"	Fassie; Traditional	5:21
7.	"Shoot Them Before They Grow"	Colbert Mukwevho; Twala	4:52
8.	"Thola Amadlozi" (Remix)	Twala	4:41
Total length:			37:01

== Personnel ==
- Brenda Fassie – Vocals
