= Mali (album) =

Studio album by Brenda Fassie
- Released: June 7, 2003
- Studio: Brenda's House Recording studio in Johannesburg
- Genres: Afro-pop; Kwaito
- Length: 44:46
- Labels: CCP Records; EMI
- Producer: Brenda Fassie .Chicco Twala Freddie Gwala

Brenda Fassie chronology
Myekeleni (2002)	Mali (2003)	Gimme Some Volume (2004)

Mali is the eighteenth studilo album by South African singer Brenda Fassie, Released on June 7, 2003, by CCP Records. Brenda Fassie produced the album alongside Sello "Chicco" Twala. Additional artists who contributed vocals to the album include Freddie Gwala.

Primarily a Kwaito album, Mali encompasses a variety of genres, including Afropop, RNB, gospel.

== Critical reception ==
Mali was met with generally favorable reviews from critics. An article of The IOL stated ".....'Brenda Fassie returns with yet another album of tipsy, feelgood weekend grooves, and though it's far from bad, Mali feels a little half-hearted in places.That impression might also have something to do with the rather spartan and uninspiring album packaging.The five tracks written and produced by Brenda herself are solid dance-pop but, with the possible exception of the infectious Ntsware-Ndibambe, they lack the sparkle to become classics.The best tracks on the album are those produced by long-term collaborator and friend, Chico Twala. Opener Ponci Ponci (which is also remixed twice) is a very enjoyable jive, but the real gem here is Mali, a beautiful spiritual lament which will bring a tear to the eye of any homesick African abroad. Even when Brenda is below par, she kicks most of her competitors into touch."

== Track listing ==
Credits adapted from Allmusic.

No.	Title	Writer(s)	Length
1.	"Ponci Ponci (Pontjie Pontjie)"	Sello "Chicco" Twala; Brenda Fassie	5:21
2.	"Mali"	Twala; Fassie	5:06
3.	"Ntsware-Ndibambe"	Brenda Fassie; Teny Maribatsi	5:55
4.	"Ngwanona"	Twala; Fassie	5:00
5.	"Undikolota Malini"	Fassie	4:45
6.	"Siyobanana"	Fassie	4:44
7.	"My Baby"	Fassie	6:14
8.	"Ngizilahlela Kuwe"	Fassie	5:29
9.	"Ponci Ponci"	Fassie; Twala	5:01
10.	"Ngwanona (Dub Mix)"	Fassie; Twala; Kamela	4:31
11.	"Ponci Ponci Pinda (Club Mix)"	Twala; Fassie	5:20

== Personnel ==
- Brenda Fassie – lead vocals
- T. P. Kamela – featured artist (track 10)
- F Gwala – additional vocals (track 8)
