= Myekeleni =

Studio album by Brenda Fassie
- Released: December 5, 2002
- Studio: Bassline Studio, Johannesburg, South Africa; Downtown Studios
- Genre: Pop; Afro-pop; Gospel; Kwaito
- Length: 40:28
- Label: CCP Records, Rhino (February 4, 2003 Re-release)
- Producer: Sello "Chicco" Twala, Brenda Fassie

Brenda Fassie chronology
| Mina Nawe (2001) | Myekeleni (2002) | Mali (2003) |

Myekeleni is the seventeen studio album by South African singer Brenda Fassie, released on December 5, 2002, in Johannesburg by CCP Records. In 2004 EMI Records re-issued this recording on a digital platform. Myekeleni is composed of mid-tempo Pop, Afropop, Gospel, Mbaqanga and Kwaito songs. DJ CALL ME has sampled the album song "Mama I'm Sorry" in his House Music version of "Mama I'm Sorry", found on his 2006 EP.

Professional ratings
Review scores
| Source | Rating |
|---|---|
| RateYourMusic | 2.83/5 stars |

The album was a hit in South Africa and around Africa, selling over a million copies.

== Tracklist ==
Credits adapted from Allmusic.

| No. | Title | Writer(s) | Length |
|---|---|---|---|
| 1. | "Sgubu Se Zion" | Brenda Fassie; Sello "Chicco" Twala | 5:12 |
| 2. | "Duma Duma" | Twala; Thami Mdluli | 5:13 |
| 3. | "Baxakekile Oxam' (Live)" | Brenda Fassie; Twala | 5:44 |
| 4. | "Shikhebe Shamago" | Twala; L. Twala | 4:47 |
| 5. | "Kesiyile Bana Baka" | Twala | 4:45 |
| 6. | "Hintoni" | L. Twala; Twala | 4:45 |
| 7. | "They All Want Me Down" | L. Twala; Twala | 4:42 |
| 8. | "Duma Duma - Gospel Mix" | L. Twala; Twala | 2:52 |
| 9. | "Come Duze" | O. Mdlongwa; Fassie | 4:47 |
| 10. | "Mama I'm Sorry" | Fassie; Twala | 4:23 |
| 11. | "Sgubu Se Zion (Zion Mix)" | L. Twala; Twala | 5:13 |
| 12. | "Thixo Ongiphile" | O. Mdlongwa: Fassie | 6:13 |

== Credit ==
- Brenda Fassie - Composer, Primary Artist, Vocals
- Sello "Chicco" Twala - Arranger, Composer, Producer
- Adam Howard - Horn
- Oscar Mdlongwa - Programming
- Oskido - Additional Vocals (Track 9)
- Mandoza - Additional Vocals (Track 1)
- Spikiri - Additional Vocals (Track 9)
- J. Mdwandi - Programming
- Jimmy Mgwandi - Bass
- Mark Morrison - Photography
- Marvin Moses - Mastering, Mixing
- Bruce Sebitlo - Keyboards, Mixing
