= Black president =

Black president may refer to:

== Politics ==
=== United States ===
- Barack Obama, first African-American president of the United States
- African-American candidates for President of the United States
- African-American heritage of presidents of the United States, including unsubstantiated rumors
- African-American presidents of the United States in popular culture

=== Elsewhere ===
Some nations which give the title "President" to their heads of state or of government (especially in sub-Saharan Africa and the Caribbean) have had numerous Black presidents.

- Nelson Mandela, the first black President of South Africa

== Music ==
- Black President (band), an American punk rock group
- Black President (Black President album), 2008
- Black President (Brenda Fassie album), 1990
  - "Black President" (song), the title song
- Black President, an album by Fela Kuti, 1981
- "Black President", a song by Nas from his untitled album, 2008

== See also ==
- O Presidente Negro (lit. The Black President), a 1926 novel by Monteiro Lobato
