= Memeza =

Studio album by Brenda Fassie
- Released: 3 November 1998
- Recorded: 1998
- Genre: Pop; Afro-pop; Kwaito
- Length: 36:47
- Label: CCP Records
- Producer: Sello Chicco Twala

Brenda Fassie chronology
| Paparazzi (1996) | Memeza (1998) | Nomakanjani (1999) |

Memeza is the thirteenth studio album recorded by South African singer Brenda Fassie released on 3 November 1998, the same day as Brenda's birthday. It was the best selling album in South Africa in 1998. The album went Platinum on the day of its release & sold over 100 000 in a week of its release. The album went to sell 700,000 copies in South Africa.

== Background ==
Memeza was released in 1997 by CCP Records in its physical form. EMI Digital re-released the album in its digital form in 2004. The music is characterised as largely pop/rock and Kwaito (a South African urban music style). Its themes range from tradition to marriage. Sello Twala and Brenda Fassie co-wrote all the songs for the album and Twala handled the production thereof.

== Track listing ==
1. "Qula"
2. "Sum' Bulala"
3. "Vuli Ndlela"
4. "Msindo"
5. "Memeza"
6. "Vuli Ndlela (Remix)"
7. "Qula (Remix)"
8. "Sum' Bulala (Remix)"
