= Ag Shame Lovey =

Studio album by Brenda Fassie
- Released: 1987
- Recorded: 1986
- Genre: Pop; disco
- Length: 20:05
- Label: CCP Records
- Producer: Malcom Watson; Sello Chicco Twala; Desmond Molotana and Rufus Vuyi Klaas; Teny Maribatsi; Traditional; Lawrence Brown; Brenda Fassie

Brenda Fassie chronology
Brenda (1987)	Ag Shame Lovey (1987)	Umuntu Ngumuntu Ngabantu (1988)

Singles from Ag Shame Lovey
- 1. "Ag Shame Lovey" Released: 1987

Ag Shame Lovey is the debut extended play(EP) by South African singer Brenda Fassie. It was released in June 1987 through CCP Records. During the recording of Brenda and the Big Dudes last album Touch Somebody (EP) (1986), the group announced that they were disbanding.

Ag Shame Lovey received generally positive reviews from music critics; the album is most notable for her single "Ag Shame Lovey".

== Personnel ==
- Brenda Fassie - lead vocals (all tracks)
- Rufus Vuyi Klaas - guitar
- Desmond Molotana - keyboards

== Track listing ==
Credits adapted from AllMusic

Ag Shame Lovey – Standard edition
No.	Title	Length
1.	"Ag Shame Lovey"	5:21
2.	"I Can't Stop Loving You"	4:05
3.	"The Lord Is My Shepherd"	5:48
4.	"Party Time - Kuya Ngokuthi Ungubani"	5:31
