= Senyaka (rapper) =

South African rapper and record producer

- Born: Thula Kekana; 13 April 1956; Evaton, Union of South Africa
- Died: 25 March 2015 (aged 58); Vereeniging, South Africa
- Occupations: Rapper; kwaito singer; record producer; actor
- Years active: 1987–2003
- Musical career
- Genres: Hip-hop, kwaito
- Labels: BMG South Africa; Gallo; Epic; Columbia

Senyaka (13 April 1956 – 25 March 2015), also known as Thula Kekana, was a South African rapper, kwaito star, record producer, and actor. A pioneer of African rap in the 1980s, Senyaka gained national infamy for South Africa's first beef when he dissed pop legend Brenda Fassie on his 1993 song, "Ma-Gents".

== Biography ==
Born to political activist Moses Kekana, a member of the Pan Africanist Congress of Azania and organizer in the 1950s Evaton bus boycotts, Kekana was nicknamed "Senyaka" (meaning "blob of jelly") by his aunt, impressed at his chubby appearance. Senyaka and the Kekana family hail from Sibitiela, also known as Zebediela.

Senyaka rose to fame in the 1980s with his hit single "Go Away", pumping transgressive humor and hardcore hip-hop in a country still not used to the sounds of pop rap and reeling under the violence of Apartheid. From 1987 to 1991, Senyaka released a blaze of solo albums fusing hip-hop with the emerging sound of kwaito – culminating in his 1993 BMG South Africa debut, Ma-Gents.

It was on the album's eponymous single that Senyaka committed cultural sacrilege – dissing national musical icon, Brenda Fassie in South Africa's first rap diss and beef. On "Ma-Gents", Senyaka called out "Brenda ke mpara" and hinted at the industry rumors about Fassie, claiming she wasn't interested in him because she didn't feel "real OGs". Fassie responded by calling him "sgatla mabhanti" – "vagabond, you take me for granted".

Senyaka's friendship with industry veteran Sello Chicco Twala led to the comedy film Moruti wa Tsotsi, produced by Chicco and starring Senyaka.

Senyaka died of pneumonia at Kopano Hospital in Welkom on 25 March 2015.. Former Radio Sesotho DJ Thuso Motaung remembers Senyaka: "That boy – when you interviewed him, you have to be extra careful! Be on your toes and pay attention to what he says – coz if you relax, unsavory words and vulgar will be said on your show that can cost your job. That boy used too much vulgar and he just didn't give a damn! It was the character in him."

== Discography ==
- Fuquza Dance (1987)
- Portugese (1988)
- Sophiatown (1989)
- Willie's My Connection (1990)
- Ntate Senyaka (1991)
- Ma-Gents (1993)
- Mampara (1995)
- Fong – Senyaka & Kamazu Are Hunger Boyz (1998)
- O Shwa Jwang O Nkolota (2001)
- Pay Back (2003)
- Fostela (2006)
