= Kubheka =

Kubheka is a surname. Notable people with the surname include:

- Christopher Kubheka (1969–2017), South African actor and model
- Khulekani Kubheka (born 1999), South African former soccer player
- Nomsa Kubheka (born 1970), South African politician
- Thalente Kubheka (fl. from 2024), South African politician

== See also ==
- Kuberaa
