= Lewinter =

Lewinter or LeWinter is a surname. Notable people with the surname include:

- Mel Lewinter, American music industry executive
- Murray Lewinter, American politician
- Oswald LeWinter, American poet
