= Jive Records =

American record label

- Parent company: Bertelsmann Music Group (BMG; 1991–2004) (Note: BMG first acquired a minority share in 1991 before purchasing a 20% stake in 1996, and eventually acquiring the label entirely in 2002 after their purchase of Zomba Label Group.); Sony BMG (2004–2008); Sony Music Entertainment (SME; 2008–2011, since 2026)
- Founded: 1981; 45 years ago (original); February 3, 2026; 9 months ago (revival)
- Founder: Clive Calder
- Defunct: October 7, 2011 (original)
- Status: Active
- Distributors: Arista (1981–1987); RCA (1987–1991); Zomba (1991–2011); Sony Music (since 2026); Legacy Recordings (reissues)
- Genre: Various
- Country of origin: United States
- Location: New York City, United States
- Official website: jiverecords.com

Jive Records is an American (Note: From its launch in 1981 until its dissolution in 2011, Jive was known as a British-American company.) record label owned by Sony Music Entertainment, a subsidiary of the Japanese conglomerate Sony. Clive Calder originally founded the label in 1981 as a subsidiary of the Zomba Group. In the US, the label had offices in New York City and Chicago. Jive was best known for its successes with hip-hop, R&B, and dance acts in the 1980s and 1990s, along with teen pop and boy bands during the late 1990s and early 2000s, including most famously Britney Spears.

Jive was acquired by Bertelsmann Music Group in 2002. In October 2008, BMG relaunched after the end of the merger when their labels were bought out by Sony Music Entertainment. Jive Records thereupon remained a unit wholly owned by Sony Music up until the label’s dissolution in 2011, when Jive alongside other former BMG-owned labels such as J, LaFace, and Arista (before its revival in 2018) was absorbed into RCA Records (also formerly owned by BMG).

The label was revived in 2026 by RCA as an independent entity within the Sony Music umbrella. Mike Weiss and David Melhado were appointed as co-presidents of the newly revived label.

== History ==
=== 1970s: Beginnings ===
In 1971, South African businessmen Clive Calder and Ralph Simon began a publishing and management company. It was named Zomba Records and relocated to London, England, four years later; their first client was a young Robert "Mutt" Lange. Zomba originally wanted to avoid record labels to instead focus on their songwriters and producers while allowing other established labels to release the material. Later that decade, the company opened offices in the US, where Calder began a business relationship with Clive Davis, whose Arista Records began releasing material by Zomba artists.

=== Formation and early distribution at Arista and RCA (1981) ===
In 1981, Zomba formed Jive Records, whose operations began with the release of British dance and pop music from groups such as Q-Feel, A Flock of Seagulls, and Tight Fit. Its name was inspired by township Jive, a type of music that originated in South Africa. Clive Davis had hoped that Zomba's connection with Mutt Lange would help alleviate the difficulties Arista was having with launching rock acts to success.

=== Hip-hop sprawl and rise in popularity (1982–1995) ===
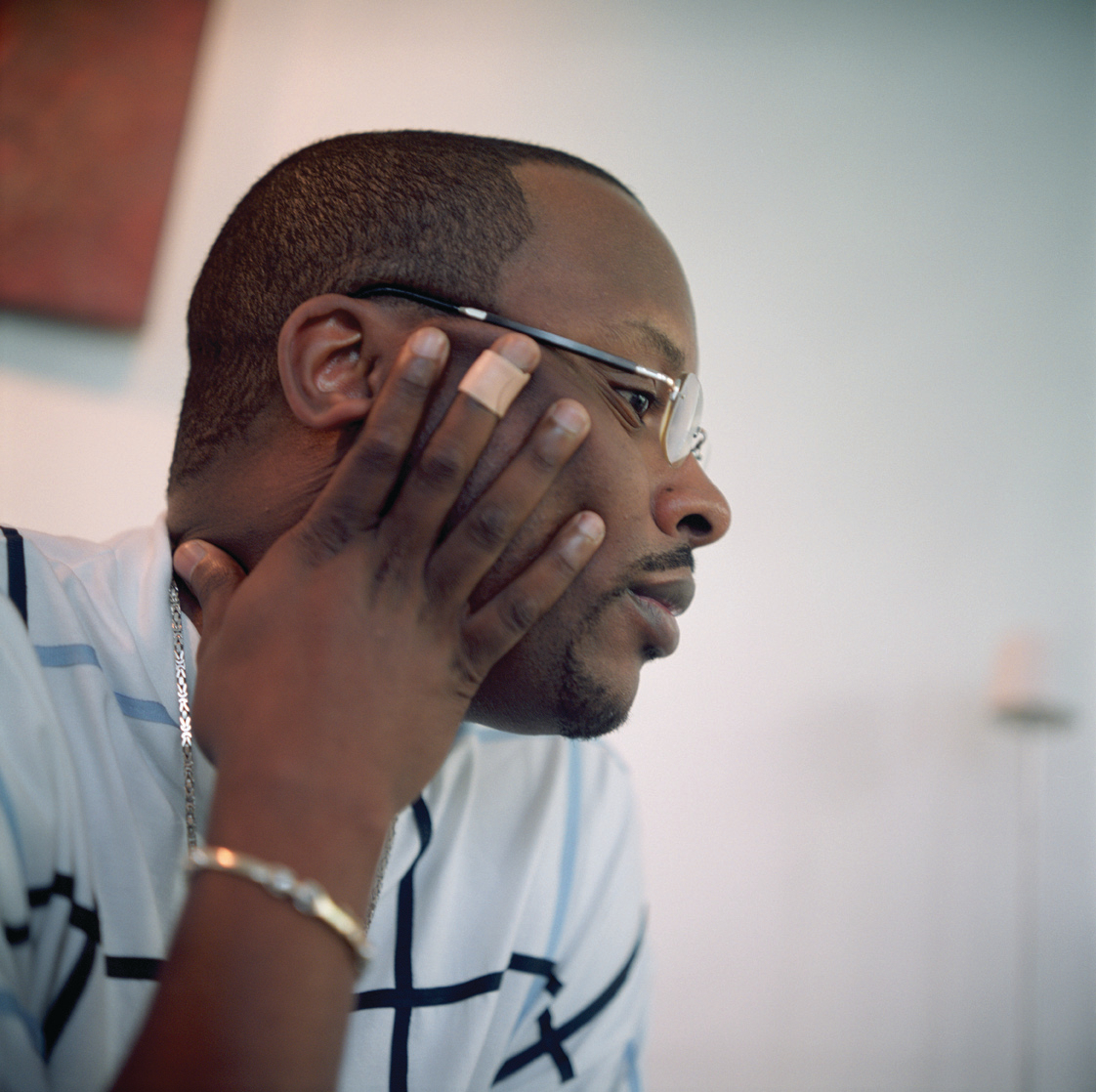
DJ Jazzy Jeff, pictured in 2002. The hip hop duo DJ Jazzy Jeff & the Fresh Prince sold over 5.5 million records with the label, and became the first hip hop act to win a Grammy Award for "Parents Just Don't Understand" in 1989.

By 1982, Calder was introduced to Barry Weiss, a young college graduate who took Calder out to hip-hop clubs in New York City for his job interview with Zomba. Weiss and Calder began grooming musicians for what would eventually become the hip-hop group Whodini. After two days, the group created and recorded its hit single "Magic's Wand." While the group would eventually leave Jive, the early success allowed the label to focus on hip-hop artists throughout the 1980s.

In 1987, Jive cut distribution ties with Arista, effectively separating them from Davis, who eschewed hip-hop music at his label. As the 1980s drew to a close, the label entered a distribution deal with Arista's sister label RCA Records, and it continued to sign hip-hop acts including DJ Jazzy Jeff & The Fresh Prince, Boogie Down Productions, Too $hort, Schoolly D, and Kid Rock.

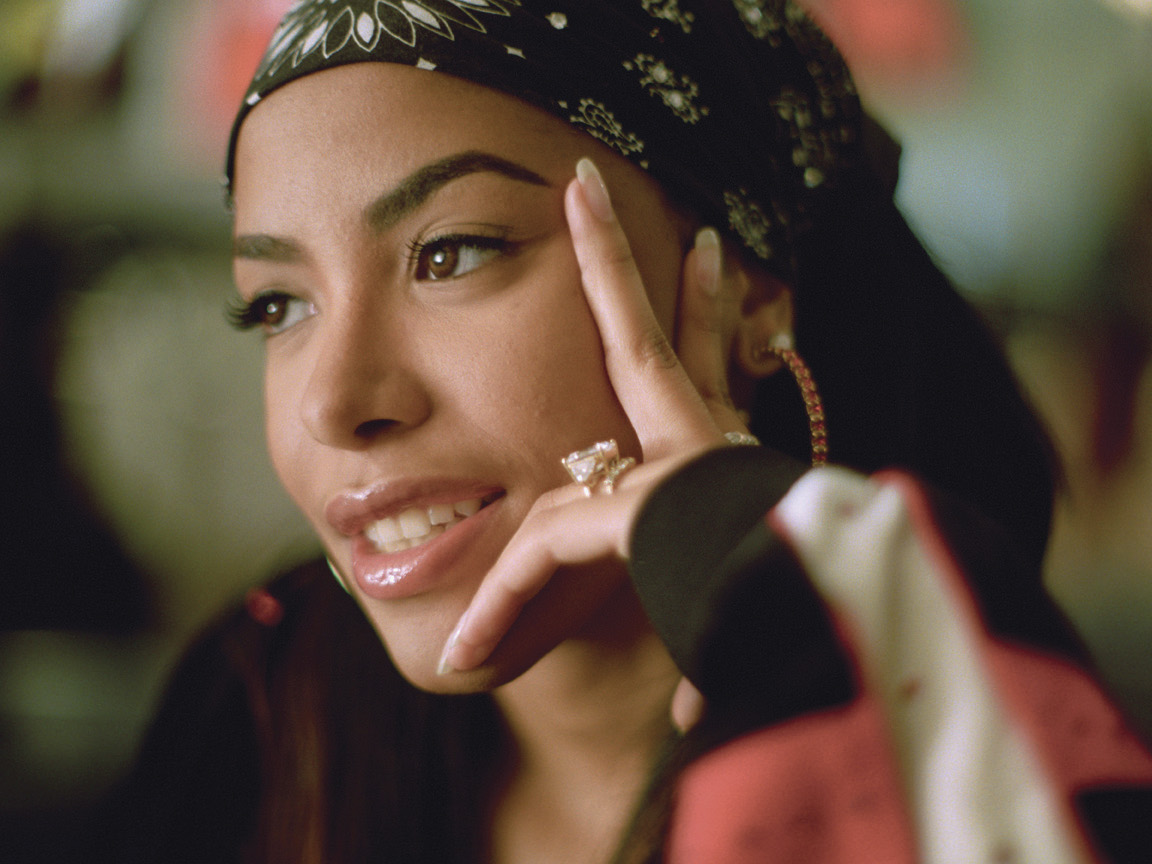
Aaliyah pictured in 2000. Her debut studio album Age Ain't Nothing But a Number sold over 6 million copies and became a multi-platinum record for the label.

In 1990, Calder bought Simon’s stake in Zomba and became the sole owner of Jive Records. Jive's distribution deal with RCA expired in 1991. At this time, Bertelsmann Music Group acquired a minority share of the label and began to distribute its records directly. Weiss became chief executive of Jive Records that year. Jive opened branches in Chicago and had also become a premier label in the genres of hip-hop and R&B with the success of acts like D-Nice, E-40, UGK, A Tribe Called Quest, Hi-Five, KRS-One/Boogie Down Productions, R. Kelly and Aaliyah.

=== Teen pop acts (1996–2001) ===
In 1996, BMG deepened its relationship with the label by purchasing a 20-percent stake of Jive. By the late 1990s, Jive began signing pop acts Backstreet Boys, NSYNC and Britney Spears. All three acts achieved massive success as the 2000s dawned, becoming the three best-selling acts in the label's history.

=== 2000s: Acquisition by BMG and Sony ===
In 2002, Calder sold Zomba to BMG for US$2.74 billion, which at the time was the largest-ever acquisition of an independent label with major-label distribution. Calder then announced his resignation from Zomba, but continued to stay on at Jive in a temporary advisory role as Zomba was integrated into BMG. Weiss succeeded Calder as the new head of Zomba. In 2004, BMG merged with Sony Music Entertainment to form Sony BMG. During this time, Jive's management and distribution were restructured under the newly formed Zomba Label Group. Artists who had previously been on LaFace and Arista Records were subsequently absorbed under the Zomba group and placed under the purview of Jive Records’ staff. Thus, artists such as Pink, Usher, and Outkast became de facto Jive artists. Though both physical record sales and teen pop had steadily declined since the early 2000s, the output from Jive’s newer artists — particularly Usher’s Confessions album and Outkast’s Speakerboxxx/The Love Below — would prove to be profitable successes for Jive. In addition to releasing Spears’ 2007 album Blackout, Jive was now also the home of a solo Justin Timberlake, whose FutureSex/LoveSounds also saw high sales. Other Jive artists at that time included Ciara and Chris Brown.

By early 2008, the BMG Label Group was said to include RCA Records, J Records, LaFace, Arista, Volcano Entertainment, Verity, GospoCentric and Fo Yo Soul — all overseen by Weiss. Later that year, Sony and BMG dissolved its merger, with the former buying out shares of the latter. As a result of Sony's buyout, Jive (along with its BMG sisters RCA and Arista) became a wholly owned unit of a refreshed Sony Music Entertainment. Starting in 2008 Jive was all capital (e.g. JIVE Records), this change started when BMG Label Group was renamed RCA/JIVE Label Group.

=== 2010s: Dormancy ===
After two decades as president of Jive, Barry Weiss left for Universal Music Group in March 2011. On October 7, 2011, it was announced that Jive, along with Arista and J Records, would be retired to refresh and re-brand RCA Records by not confusing or diluting it with other labels. All retained artists on those labels were then moved to RCA Records. Distribution of its back catalog was handled by Sony Music's Legacy Recordings. Previously, the Jive brand was being exclusively used under the Sony Music France division under the name Jive Epic in France until 2019, when it was absorbed into RCA Records France.

=== 2020s: Revival ===
Hits reported in January 2026 that "young heavy hitters" could potentially relaunch the label. The following month, Sony Music announced RCA had revived Jive as a standalone label. Mike Weiss (son of Barry Weiss) and David Melhado, who both worked as executives at music distributor UnitedMasters, were named as co-presidents of the label. Per the press release, the label will operate out of Sony Music's New York City headquarters.

== R. Kelly controversy ==
On September 27, 2021, singer R. Kelly was found guilty by a federal jury of acts including bribery and sexual exploitation of a child. Allegations of Kelly’s sexual misconduct had long followed the singer since his early career with Jive in the early 1990s, as well as throughout the 2000s when a video tape surfaced allegedly showing Kelly engaging in sexual acts with a minor and when Kelly was arrested for possession of child pornography.

Despite the scandals, Kelly remained signed to Jive’s roster and continued to release albums with the label up to its merger with RCA in 2011. In 2018, the Washington Post ran a lengthy article alleging industry executives at Jive had been aware of Kelly's sexually abusive behavior towards young women for years, but did nothing about them due to his success as a performer and songwriter. The article reported Clive Calder had been warned about Kelly’s behavior as early as 1994; it quoted him: "Clearly, we missed something."

Former Jive president Barry Weiss told the newspaper that during his 20 years with the label, he never concerned himself with Kelly's private life, and was unaware of two lawsuits filed against Kelly and the label by women alleging sexual misconduct, suits in which the label had successfully argued it was not liable. Larry Khan, another Jive executive who worked closely with the singer even after viewing the sex tape, similarly implied Kelly’s misconduct was not the label's responsibility and pointed to Chuck Berry and Jerry Lee Lewis as musicians whose labels also continued to release and promote their records despite public awareness that they were involved with underage girls.

== See also ==
- Zomba Group of Companies
- RCA/Jive Label Group
- List of record labels

== Bibliography ==
- Knopper, Steve (2009). Appetite for self-destruction : the spectacular crash of the record industry in the digital age. New York: Free Press. ISBN 978-1-4165-5215-4. OCLC 209699402.
