= Zomba Group =

British record label

Zomba Label Group
- Parent company: Sony Music Entertainment (recorded music catalog); Universal Music Publishing Group and BMG Publishing (publishing catalog)
- Founded: 1975; 51 years ago (as Zomba Corporation); London, England
- Founder: Clive Calder, Ralph Simon
- Status: Inactive
- Distributors: Epic Records; RCA Records; Provident Label Group; Legacy Recordings
- Genre: Various
- Country of origin: United Kingdom
- Location: London, England, UK; New York City, New York, U.S. Nashville, Tennessee, U.S.
- Official website: zombalabelgroup.com (archived)

The Zomba Group of Companies (sometimes referred to as Zomba Music Group or just Zomba Group) was a music group and division owned by and operated under Sony Music Entertainment. The division was renamed to Jive Label Group in 2009 and was placed under the RCA/Jive Label Group umbrella. In 2011, the RCA/Jive Label Group was split in half. Multiple Jive Label Group artists were moved to Epic Records while others stayed with Jive as it moved under the RCA Music Group. In October 2011 Jive Records was shut down and their artists were moved to RCA Records.

Founded independently in the mid-seventies by Clive Calder and Ralph Simon, the group has had interests in music release, distribution, production, publishing, equipment rental, recording studios, and artist management. Though the financial structure and annual revenue of Zomba during the company's independent period was only known to CEO Clive Calder (the company was registered privately offshore in the Dutch Antilles), Zomba was widely regarded as the most successful of the independent music companies.

The group is perhaps best known for its role in developing some of the most popular forms of music, such as hip-hop in the 1980s, and the teen pop/boy band phenomenon in the late 1990s through their first record label Jive, though they have also had substantial activities in both the Christian and gospel music field. Calder and Simon both served as CEOs until 1990 when Calder bought out Simon's share and ran the company himself until 2002. In 2002, BMG purchased the company and subsequently restructured the labels under the umbrella company Zomba Label Group, which was the most public face of the company. The label group served as a parent for many different labels, including Jive, Silvertone, Volcano and LaFace.

Today, all the Zomba labels were absorbed into RCA Records and Epic Records, as well as Legacy Recordings, Sony's division for catalogue reissues, while Music for Nations and Silvertone are currently owned by Sony Music UK.

The company still owns the "Zomba" and "Jive" trademarks as of 2018 through a Swiss company called Zomba Corporation.

== History ==
=== South African Roots: Calder, Simon and Lange ===
In late 1971, Clive Calder and Ralph Simon began their two-decade partnership in forming businesses in record production and promotion, music publishing, artist management and concert promotion in South Africa. Because of the market in South Africa, there was a need to branch out into various aspects of the business, instead of just focusing on one aspect of the industry. "You couldn't do just one thing. It was too small," explained David Gresham, CEO of David Gresham Record Company. "This is not a country where you have a million-seller. A No. 1 record is a 10,000 unit seller. That only pays the rent for a month or two." While almost mandatory in South Africa, this early style of music company would be adapted to other markets throughout the companies history, and would become a staple of Calder's managing legacy.

Early companies formed by Calder and Simon were Sagittarius Management and Clive Calder Productions (CCP). CCP was distributed by EMI Records South Africa who purchased the company in 1972. Although Calder has no stake in it now, it still exists as a wholly owned subsidiary of Universal Music, having acquired most of EMI in 2013, specializing in the recording, development and marketing of domestic artists. Calder's relationship with EMI began when he had been an A&R Manager at EMI South Africa for eighteen months. There he had signed some big groups for the time such as Freedom's Children and the Otis Waygood Blues Band. During this time, Calder was also a bassist in a few bands. He formed the Four Dukes and the In Crowd with EMI artist Peter Vee, whom he also produced. Calder eventually paired Lee with a young producer named Mutt Lange, who at the time had produced for David Gresham and David Gresham Records local hit "Sunday Monday Tuesday" by Jessica Jones on Gresham's Nitty Gritty Records.

=== Zomba in London ===
The trio of Calder, Simon and Lange decided in 1974 that they had to get out of South Africa, with Simon saying, "We were politically very much opposed to the old apartheid regime". The trio pooled together what little money they had and moved to London. Having landed right in the middle of the British punk rock movement, they opted to create a publishing company; Zomba Corporation was officially registered in Switzerland in 1975, operating out of Calder's bedroom space in London. The name "Zomba" referred to the capital of African country Malawi (Lilongwe superseded Zomba as Malawi's capital in 1974).

Next, Calder and Simon began looking for songwriters. The first was Henri Belolo, the French producer who helped create the Village People. Zomba became the disco group's British publisher. Though the band had been turned down by a few UK labels, Calder and Simon thought they could retain the most control of Zomba if they stayed in the publishing and management business, allowing other labels to release their artists' music. Meanwhile, Lange was building a name for himself as a producer, with albums by the Boomtown Rats, Graham Parker and eventually AC/DC's 1979 Highway to Hell, his breakthrough album. This led to Lange becoming one of the world's leading hard-rock producers, later adding Def Leppard, Foreigner and Bryan Adams to his resume. For Zomba, this increased exposure and credibility led to many new producer and songwriter management deals. Additionally, artists would sign publishing deals, giving their publishing company a constantly burgeoning collection.

In early 1978, Zomba opened offices in New York City and began looking for more artists and songwriters. Clive Davis was one of the first to contact the group, who used his recently formed Arista Records to distribute Zomba artists. The first major signing was Billy Ocean. Over the next few years, Zomba's songwriters achieved success and the publishing profits kicked in, marking the beginning of the company's first major expansion into record labels. Though Davis wanted Calder to head Arista's West Coast A&R operations, Calder had different plans altogether, and instead presented Jive Records to Davis.

=== Jive: taking a chance with rap ===
Arista had been having trouble pushing rock acts in the US, and Clive Davis had hoped that with Zomba's Mutt Lange connection, Jive would fill that role. However, Calder had other ideas. In 1981, Jive began operations by releasing British dance and pop music such as Q-Feel, A Flock of Seagulls and Tight Fit. By 1982, Calder was introduced to a young fresh college graduate named Barry Weiss who, for his job interview with Zomba, took Calder out to hip-hop and black clubs all over New York City. Calder was immediately impressed with the man and had him scanning sales data all over the country searching for unknown acts on small labels selling large numbers. Calder got one of his songwriters Thomas Dolby to create a catchy hook for local DJ Mr. Magic to rap over. Mr. Magic had to cancel at the last minute, but fortunately knew another rapper, Jalil Hutchins. Weiss's stress level shot up when Hutchins came to the session with another unknown rapper named Ecstasy and no rhymes. After two days, the group created and recorded "Magic's Wand", which turned into a hit single. Weiss named the group Houdini, but Calder changed it to Whodini. Calder flew the group to London to record an album, then to Germany to record with producer Konrad "Conny" Plank of Devo and Ultravox fame. While the group would eventually leave Jive after a few albums, the early success resulted in Jive becoming a label with a focus on hip-hop artists throughout the eighties. At a time when the record establishment wouldn't touch urban music like rap, a white South African successfully marketed some of the edgiest black music.

After Whodini, Jive began signing other rap artists into the later half of the decade. Boogie Down Productions was signed on the strength of their first record Criminal Minded, and their Jive debut By All Means Necessary was released in 1988. West Coast rapper Too Short was picked up by Jive after his independently released Born to Mack sold over 50,000 copies. Jive gave the album national distribution which led to gold status, and then quickly issued his follow up Life Is...Too Short, which achieved platinum status. Meanwhile, Jive signed DJ Jazzy Jeff & The Fresh Prince in 1986 and released their debut Rock the House. The duo was a great success for Jive, helping make rap music more accessible.

Jive continued to support rap artists into the nineties, with the aforementioned groups and the signing of new acts. KRS-One, the primary force behind Boogie Down Productions, released a string of solo albums with Jive beginning with Return of the Boom Bap in 1993. In 1991, Jive signed R&B artist R. Kelly who, along with his backing band Public Announcement, released their debut album Born into the 90's in early 1992. R. Kelly began his solo career with 12 Play in 1993, and would go on to spend eighteen years with Jive in a partnership that produced ten studio albums. A Tribe Called Quest was signed by Jive in 1989 following a successful independently released single "Description of a Fool." The group's debut album People's Instinctive Travels and the Paths of Rhythm was released by Jive in 1990 and framed the group as one of the most intelligent rap groups. Many other rap and R&B artists were signed throughout the eighties and nineties before the teen-pop explosion in the later half of the decade.

=== Expansion ===
By 1990, Zomba was worth $225 million with over fifty companies. Contrary to many other record businesses at the time, Zomba was known for its frugality. "The Jive offices were crummy, cardboard desks. They just really did everything on the cheap", said attorney Gary Stiffelman. The company began to attract more major label attention when EMI attempted to buy the company, but was ultimately turned down. This period also saw Ralph Simon leaving Zomba at the start of the decade. Through an unspecified "ethical disagreement", Calder and Simon ended their relationship of over two decades. Calder bought out Simon's half of the company and subsequently gained full control of the company. In late 1991, BMG furthered its relationship with Zomba by purchasing a 25% stake in their music publishing business, allowing them to sub-publish Zomba compositions in foreign markets. BMG continued their involvement with a 20% purchase of Zomba's records division in 1996.

Building on the successes of the Jive label, Zomba began expanding its reach by purchasing and creating new labels, and by creating new divisions that helped expose more people to Zomba artists and services. In 1988, Andrew Lauder formed the UK-based Silvertone Records under the Zomba Group. While Jive focused on hip hop, Silvertone focused on more rock-oriented music. The label's roster was initially bolstered by The Stone Roses, but quickly expanded to include blues, acoustic, and roots music. Other artists featured early on Silvertone include John Lee Hooker, J.J. Cale and The Men They Couldn't Hang. This period also saw one of the few times that Zomba attempted cracking the classical music market. In 1992, Zomba purchased UK classical music group Conifer Classics with the aide of the group's head Alison Wenham. Though the deal appeared to be solid, Zomba sold the company to BMG in 1995. Classical music activities have remained minimal within the company since then. Building on existing publishing deals, Zomba briefly co-owned the UK label Sanctuary Records. While the co-ownership only lasted between 1989 and 1991, the two companies continued working together in other avenues, including a publishing deal with Sanctuary artists Iron Maiden. In 1998, Zomba purchased a 50% stake in the troubled label Volcano Entertainment (then called Freeworld). The label had been under financial pressure due to various reasons, including a lawsuit from flagship artist Tool. Though the purchase was initially shared with management firm Q Prime, Q Prime promptly sold their half to Zomba, making Volcano a wholly owned Zomba subsidiary. Zomba's first action was to settle the lawsuit with Tool, who would go on to become another Zomba success throughout the 2000s, representing the broad stylistic reach of artists under the Zomba Group umbrella. In December 2000, Volcano Entertainment purchased Capricorn Records from Phil Walden, an independent record label launched by Walden, his brother Alan Walden and Frank Fenter in 1969. With the acquisition, the Zomba subsidiary gained a large catalog of music as well as active bands 311, Goldfinger, Reel Big Fish, 2 Skinnee J's and the jam bands Galactic and Widespread Panic.

In 1993, Zomba created Zomba! Music Services in order to facilitate publishing rights for those in the film and television industry. The division would act as a channel through which clients could acquire products and services from any company within Zomba. Songs published by Zomba Music Publishers Ltd., or released on any of the Zomba labels, or specialty recordings owned by the division itself, could be sourced for inclusion on film soundtracks, television shows or commercials. This move generated profits for Zomba by providing access to the company's vast publishing catalogue.

The year 1994 saw the first of many of Zomba's successful forays into the Christian music scene with the purchase of the Brentwood Music Group. Brentwood was an established company consisting of an extensive Christian distribution network, several labels, and one of the largest music publishing divisions in printed choral music in the U.S. Expanding on the Brentwood purchase, Zomba purchased the Christian label group Reunion Records from BMG in October 1996. In 1997, Zomba purchased yet another Christian music affiliated company, the Benson Music Group, from Music Entertainment Group. An important asset of the Brentwood acquisition was the publishing arm, founded in 1902, that included 46,000 copyrights from artists such as Elvis Presley, Dolly Parton, Linda Ronstadt, and Willie Nelson.

In reaction to the surge in Christian-oriented labels acquired over the past few years, Zomba created the Provident Music Group in June 1997. The Nashville-based group was led by Jim Van Hook and was essentially a continuation of the Brentwood group and an amalgamation of the other Christian-oriented labels. The group consisted of the Benson, Brentwood and Reunion groups, as well as the Brentwood/Benson Publishing Group and the newly formed Provident Music Distribution arms. This new group allowed the three main sublabels to unify their resources and distribution while still retaining their separate personalities in the market.

In 1996, Zomba acquired the Windsong Holdings, which gave them control of many new companies including Windsong International, Pinnacle Entertainment and Music For Nations. It also gave them control of the established music company Rough Trade (80% of Rough Trade Records Germany/Switzerland/Austria (GSA) and 100% of Rough Trade Benelux). Rough Trade was primarily known as a distributor, but it also ran many electronic music labels based in Germany. In July 1999, Rough Trade GSA was renamed Zomba Records GmbH, while the Benelux operation (which only had distribution at the time) was absorbed into Zomba Distribution. The Rough Trade name remained as an imprint of Zomba Records GmbH, but was largely abandoned by Zomba.

With the successful integration of Rough Trade into its operations in the GSA region and Benelux and to expand on recent teen pop successes, Zomba created a London-based international label group, Zomba International Records Group. Directed by Stuart Watson, the new organization allowed each new local territory to freely sign and develop acts on its own. If those artists could create a strong regional profile, it would be possible to "export" them to Zomba International for broader exposure. Simultaneously, it allowed Zomba artists increased international exposure. The expansion was largely unhampered, with the exception of legal issues regarding the Australian branch. Australian record company Festival Mushroom Group lost at least a dozen employees to Zomba in early 1999 and placed an injunction that stopped Zomba from soliciting Mushroom employees; they also accused former employee Scott Murphy of trying to bolster Zomba's presence while still working for Mushroom. However, the issue was resolved fairly amicably and ended with a distribution deal with BFM Distribution (a joint venture of Festival Mushroom Group and BMG).

As the record industry began evolving due to the increasingly widespread use of the Internet, and the growing ease with which artists could record music at home, Zomba made moves that illustrated their desire to adapt with the times. In 2000, they joined the growing list of record companies that made some music available via digital download with online distribution company Amplified Entertainment. In 2002, Zomba joined major labels EMI, Universal and BMG, with approving some of their Jive catalog for release on the new DataPlay media. Though the media was largely unsuccessful, the move illustrated Zomba's competitiveness with the major labels in the growing digital world. However, a negative outcome of the changing times was the closure of some of Zomba's Battery Studios and Dreamline equipment rental businesses during the end of 2001.

=== Teen Pop explosion ===
Around 1993, Clive Calder began his uneasy relationship with Lou Pearlman. Pearlman had put together a new group, Backstreet Boys, which was languishing on Mercury Records without any hits. Pearlman presented the group to Calder along with Jive A&R rep David McPherson. Though Calder was initially uninterested in the boy band due to the dominance of grunge and alternative rock music, Calder later thought the group could help expand his operations overseas. Zomba bought out the boys' contract for $35,000 and moved the group over to Zomba imprint Jive. Calder immediately sent the group to Sweden and matched them with a group of producers found through Zomba scouts: Dag Volle and Martin Sandberg. In mid-1995, the band recorded three songs including their first single at Cheiron Studios in Stockholm. Calder then connected the Boys with old friend Stuart Watson; Watson ran SWAT Enterprises, a company specializing in promotion in Asia. The Boys began touring relentlessly in Asia and released their first album, which sold one million copies in three weeks. In 1997, when Calder thought the grunge phenomenon had sufficiently passed, he had the Backstreet Boys return to the United States where their North American debut ended up selling upwards of 14 million copies, creating the first in a run of many hits that Zomba and the Backstreet Boys would enjoy together.

While Pearlman and Watson were breaking the Backstreet Boys overseas, Jive A&R man Steve Lunt was busy in the US seeking a female star, and was greeted with 15-year-old Britney Spears. Initially horrified by Spears' karaoke demo of a Toni Braxton song sung in the wrong register, Lunt was intrigued by a brief moment at the end where he heard the "kind of soul she had." As was the standard at Zomba, Lunt took Spears to in-house songwriter and producer Eric Foster White in the company's publishing division, and the two recorded "You Got It All." Like the Backstreet Boys, Spears was sent to Cheiron Studios in Stockholm to record with producer Max Martin. Within four months of debuting on radio in September 1998, Spears' song "...Baby One More Time" reached number one on the Billboard Hot 100 chart in January 1999, a position it would hold for four consecutive weeks.

In 1999, Zomba was involved in a "boy band controversy" when trying to sign another group that Pearlman had put together himself, *NSYNC. NSYNC had recently left RCA due to allegations that Pearlman had taken approximately 50% of their profits and not the one-sixth that he had agreed to. Seeing the group as a "free-agent," Jive quickly signed them and prepared to release their next album. On 12 October, Pearlman's company Trans Continental, in conjunction with RCA owner BMG Entertainment and BMG Ariola Munich sued Jive Records, Clive Calder, and the members of NSYNC for $150 million, citing, among other things, breach of contract. Pearlman sought an injunction against the release of the band's new album and demanded the group's recordings be given to him, but Pearlman was denied in court. As a response to the suit, and in reference to treatment by Trans Continental, NSYNC released a statement citing the company's poor conduct as "the most glaring, overt, and callous example of artist exploitation that the music industry has seen in a long time." The lawsuit was settled on 23 December with undisclosed terms, leaving Jive free to release future NSYNC albums.

The lawsuit, which Rolling Stone called "the music industry's nastiest legal skirmishes in years," was problematic for Zomba for two main reasons. First, having heard that NSYNC was now signed to Jive, the Backstreet Boys did not want to be a part of the label anymore. Second, the lawsuit temporarily strained Zomba's relationship with BMG, whose distribution deal with Zomba was coming to a close. Jive initially announced they would not renew their deal with BMG, but reconsidered following the lawsuit with BMG and Trans Continental. The distribution deal may have factored into the lawsuit's outcome, since distributed Zomba product accounted for 5.5% of BMG's US market share, an arrangement BMG Entertainment CEO Strauss Zelnick was under pressure not to lose. Jive also signed a new deal with the Backstreet Boys that gave the band a 20% royalty rate.

=== From BMG to Sony, and recent activities ===
BMG had owned 25% of Zomba's publishing business since 1991 and 20% of its recording business since 1996. As part of BMG's 1996 agreement with Zomba, the music giant was required to follow through on a put option and buy the remaining shares it did not already own before 31 December 2002. In June 2002, Clive Calder decided to exercise the put option. Effective 26 November 2002, BMG Entertainment concluded its deal with Zomba for the purchase of the company's entire assets. While Calder had originally requested $3.2 billion for his shares in Zomba, valuation of the label's assets varied from $1.6 billion to $2.4 billion. Following the purchase negotiations, a price of $2.74 billion was agreed upon, the biggest purchase of an independent label at the time. Zomba's sale had been the latest in a series of independent label sellouts including Island Records and Geffen Records (both sold to Universal for $300 million and $550 million, respectively), and Virgin (sold for $950 million to EMI). The $2.74 billion paid for the Zomba Group was more than was paid for the purchase of many others labels including Island, Geffen, Virgin, A&M, Motown, Chrysalis, and Def Jam, combined.

Initially, BMG took its time in integrating Zomba with the rest of its labels, hoping that the former independent would lift BMG’s worldwide ranking from fifth to fourth-largest record company. Calder resigned his position as CEO immediately after the purchase, but stayed on at Zomba in an advisory position for about another year. In mid-2003, BMG began its worldwide integration of Zomba, cutting hundreds of jobs through the consolidation of regional operations. While many of the key managers stayed, and the large offices in the US and the UK remained operational, all of the other regional offices were assimilated into BMG. In addition to the regional mergers, the Zomba and BMG publishing companies were integrated. The US and UK offices remained as stand-alone units, but many of the back-office functions were consolidated into BMG. The Provident Music Group, Zomba's foray into the Christian music market, was reassigned as a RCA sub-label. By 2004, the record labels were reorganized under the Zomba Label Group.

In 2004, BMG and Sony Music Entertainment merged to form Sony BMG Music Entertainment, taking Zomba with it. Though the merger was plagued with controversy and eventually ended with Sony buying out BMG's stake in late 2008, Zomba executives continued to expand the company's operations in various aspects. In 2007, as part of Sony BMG integration and consolidation, RCA Music Group and Zomba Label Group merged their international, sales and field staffs to form the BMG Label Group under Sony BMG. RCA and Zomba kept separate groups under BMG, but this configuration was short-lived due to the dissolution of the Sony BMG merger. Zomba became owned wholly by, and operated under Sony.

On 2 November 2004 the American Federation of Musicians announced that it had entered into an agreement with Zomba. Effective 1 January 2005, the labor union covered all artists on any Zomba subsidiary labels (and any future labels) under the Federation's Sound Recording Labor Agreement. The deal ensured that all artists under the Zomba aegis would receive, for the first time, a full range of benefits and protections, among which are scale payments, industry standard working conditions and pension contributions.

In 2005, Zomba formed Zomba Gospel under the Zomba Label Group in an effort to collate its recently expanding gospel labels. Zomba's interest in gospel began in the form of a distribution deal with GospoCentric Records (and sublabel B'Rite Music) in October 2001, which Zomba later purchased in 2004. Verity Records president Max Siegel was charged with heading the new entity which included Zomba labels Verity and GospoCentric, as well as four artist owned imprints: Quiet Water Entertainment (Donald Lawrence), Fo Yo Soul Entertainment (Kirk Franklin), New Life Records (John P. Kee) and F. Hammond Music (Fred Hammond). Distribution was handled by Provident-Integrity for the Christian Bookselling Association, and through Sony Distribution (formerly Sony BMG) for the mainstream market.

Zomba's publishing division also continued its expansion. In 2006, Zomba Music Publishing purchased the catalogue of the UK-based Strongsongs Music Publishing from the Telstar Music Group. This large acquisition expanded Zomba's rights to many international hitmakers including Metallica, Craig David and Dannii Minogue, among others.

Richard Blackstone joined Zomba in 1989 as President of Zomba Music Publishing, overseeing a writer and catalog roster that included R. Kelly, Justin Timberlake, the Backstreet Boys, Britney Spears, and Linking Park. Blackstone left in 2005 to become chairman and CEO of Warner/Chappell Music, and was succeeded as President of Zomba Music Publishing by David Mantel.

Following the appointment of Mantel, the company began to take a different signing approach that focused on unknown or unsigned artists. Mantel's first signing was T-Pain, whose two singles "I'm Sprung" and "I'm ‘n Luv (Wit a Stripper)" hit number 8 and 5 respectively on the Billboard Hot 100. This type of signing was also used in the records division where artists or producers were given their own imprint. In October 2008, Zomba made an all-inclusive multiyear joint-venture deal with Hitz Committee Entertainment, an imprint that had been in the making for almost 5 years from Jive VP of A&R Mickey "MeMpHiTz" Wright. Beginning in 2008, Hitz Committee consisted of a record label under Sony, music production, music publishing, artist and producer management, and TV and film projects.

== Company structure ==
The structure of the Zomba Group during the independent era (1975 to 2002) is difficult to precisely pinpoint due to the private nature of Clive Calder's managing style. During that period, Calder's private investment group Summer Shore NV controlled the Zomba group. The company began as Zomba Management and Publishers as early as 1975. They expanded to the US, first with a publishing sector in 1978, and then a records division in 1981 while the management and publishing divisions became separate companies. Also sometime during that period, they started a production division initially called Zomba Productions Ltd., which would become Zomba Recording Corporation. From a legal standpoint, Zomba's holdings are divided into their music publishing business (Zomba Music Holdings BV) and music recording business (Zomba Record Holdings BV). The former holds only music publishing (i.e., written music) rights, while the latter holds all of the recorded music rights, along with some publishing groups acquired over the years. In addition to those two, there is another holding company called Zomba Entertainment Holdings BV. Below is a breakdown of most of the companies and divisions that have been owned by Zomba. Since the BMG integration in mid-2003, and further integration into Sony Music in early 2009, the exact status of some companies is not known.

=== Records division ===
Zomba labels were operated under the Zomba Label Group from approximately 2004 until 2009 (now part of the RCA/Jive Label Group). The Provident Label Group contained other labels after its purchase in 1997, but is no longer a part of Zomba. The Windsong purchase gave Zomba control of labels through a variety of company structures including Pinnacle and Rough Trade, however, some of these labels are no longer a part of Zomba. These three groups are organized separately below, followed by a list of inactive or formerly owned labels from various periods.

Zomba's first, and flagship label is Jive, formed in 1981. Since then, Zomba has acquired and created a variety of labels and label groups that either operate independently from, or under Jive. During its independent period, the various record labels under Zomba all reported directly to a records division. There was no formal public face for the labels until BMG formed Zomba Label Group in 2004. Though the term "Zomba label group" or "Zomba Group records division" had been used previously to refer to the various labels owned by the company, it wasn't until then that an actual company was created to control the labels specifically. The Zomba Recording Corporation continues to coordinate production activities on many Zomba subsidiary releases.

From 1981 until 1987, Zomba labels were distributed by Arista. After 1987, Zomba signed a deal with RCA for distribution that lasted until 1991. The end of the deal coincided with BMG purchasing a large share of RCA, and a deal with BMG was signed for distribution. BMG remained the North American distributor for Zomba until after the purchase in 2002; however, other regions had various other distributors over time. EMI became an important distributor for Zomba in Europe via Virgin Records, but distribution details are listed below in the Regional Branches section. Zomba only controls one small vinyl pressing plant; therefore, most of their manufacturing has been outsourced to companies such as Sonopress (BMG affiliated), Sony, and Technicolor.

In 1996, Zomba acquired 75% of UK distributor and label group Pinnacle, 80% of the Rough Trade label and distribution in the Germany/Switzerland/Austria (GSA) region, and 100% of Rough Trade Benelux. Effective 8 July 1999, Rough Trade Records was renamed Zomba Records GmbH and the Rough Trade sales and distribution arm was renamed Zomba Distribution, operating as a division of Zomba Records GmbH. As of the BMG purchase, Zomba conducted its own distribution in the UK (with Pinnacle), Germany, Austria and Benelux (all with Zomba Distribution). In those areas, Zomba also distributed for various smaller independent labels. In France, Italy, Portugal, Spain and Sweden, Zomba had its own marketing and sales; however, distribution was handled by EMI (through Virgin in most cases). In Finland and Greece, Zomba material was exclusively licensed to EMI who controlled marketing, sales and distribution. North American distribution has almost exclusively been with BMG. Following the BMG purchase in December 2002 and subsequent integration in June 2003 and the end of contracts with EMI (also in June), all distribution has been handled by the local BMG companies. When BMG merged with Sony, Sony BMG became Zomba's distributor from 2004 until early 2009. Zomba products were thereupon distributed by Sony Music since Sony purchased BMG's interest in their joint-venture.

==== Zomba Recording Corporation ====
Zomba Recording Corporation (previously Zomba Productions Ltd., and sometimes colloquially referred to as Zomba Records) is a music company and division of the Zomba Group. The US affiliate is Zomba Recording LLC and the UK affiliate is Zomba Records Ltd. The company also runs an investment and financial services company called Zomba Ventures Inc.

Primarily a production company, Zomba Recording Corporation coordinates various activities for the recording process including the hiring of musicians, managing studios, and organization of production, mixing, and mastering personnel. Recordings made under the coordination or supervision of this division were marked with the phrase "An Original Sound Recording Made by Zomba Recording Corporation (or Zomba Recording LLC/Zomba Records Limited/Zomba Productions Limited)." While not strictly a record label, Zomba Recording Corporation appears on most of the various sublabels that Zomba owns. Additionally, the minimal manufacturing as well as some distribution that Zomba does on its own is run through this company.

Battery Studios is the name of Zomba Recording Corporation's chain of multi-room facilities often used in the music production of Zomba artists. The main facility, located in New York City, is constantly associated with high-profile clients including R. Kelly, 'N Sync and Britney Spears. The studio featured three recording and mixing studios with SSL 9000, SSL 4064 G+ and Euphonix CS3000 consoles and Pro Tools MIXplus systems. Battery Studios was originally established in London prior to opening of the New York branch, and at one point consisted of six locations in London, four New York locations, two Nashville locations, and one location in Chicago. Zomba closed its London branches towards the end of 2001, with others following soon after. In addition to Battery Studios, Zomba Recording Corporation began a relationship with the established Swedish studio Cheiron Studios and its production personnel. The studio had operated since the mid-1980s (as SweMix); from 1996 until its closure in 2000, Cheiron shared a joint production and publishing venture with the Zomba Group. Apart from the actual studio, the venture included a production team that helped forge the sounds of Backstreet Boys, Britney Spears, and NSYNC.

In addition to recording studios, Zomba Recording Corporation operated Dreamhire Professional audio Rentals. Dreamhire opened in 1984 with operations in London, New York City (1989) and Nashville (1988). The London branch closed in 2001, followed by Nashville in 2003. Dreamhire also included Hilton Sound, a hire operation purchased by Zomba in 1996. Since November 2003 following the BMG purchase, Dreamhire is no longer a part of Zomba and runs independently as Dreamhire LLC in New York City, owned by Chris Dunn, ex-bass guitarist of UK band City Boy (which recorded 5 albums all produced by Mutt Lange).

==== Zomba Label Group ====
During its existence, the Zomba Label Group featured all of the Zomba-related labels that BMG purchased in 2002. The Battery Records is unrelated to the previous defunct imprint of the same name. The structure of the Zomba Label Group immediately before its rebranding and dissolution in 2009 included:

- Battery Records
- Jive Records
  - Jive Electro
  - Mojo Records
- LaFace Records
- Silvertone Records
- So So Def Recordings
- Volcano Entertainment
- Verity Gospel Music Group (previously Zomba Gospel)
  - F. Hammond Music
  - Fo Yo Soul Entertainment
  - GospoCentric
  - New Life Records
  - Quiet Water Entertainment
  - Verity Records

==== Provident Music Group ====
The Provident Music Group was created by Zomba in 1997 as an amalgamation of their Christian music activities. Zomba had purchased Brentwood Music Group in February 1994 and founder Jim Van Cook was charged with leading the new music group. The group consisted of three sections: Provident Label Group, Provident-Integrity Distribution and the Brentwood/Benson Publishing Group.

As part of the music group, Zomba amalgamated their Christian labels under the Provident Label Group. The new group initially consisted of Brentwood Records, Benson Records and Reunion Records, though Brentwood was shut down in 2001. Since then, other labels have been added. Under Zomba, the Provident Label Group had this configuration:

- Benson Records
  - Diadem Records
- Essential Records
  - Sub•Lime Records
  - Watershed Records
- Flicker Records
- Reunion Records
  - Rode Dog Records
- Verity Records

After BMG bought Zomba in 2002 and integrated the company in June 2003, the Provident Music Group was moved under the aegis of RCA with the exception of the Publishing division, which was moved under BMG Publishing (Provident would later create its own publishing division, Essential Music Publishing, with no connection to Zomba). BMG Publishing was subsequently sold to Universal, along with Brentwood/Benson. In 2008, when Sony bought Bertelsmann's stake in their joint Sony BMG venture, the rest of Provident became part of Sony Music Nashville.

==== Windsong (Pinnacle, Rough Trade, Music For Nations) ====
In 1996, Zomba acquired the holdings of Windsong International. The deal gave the following controlling interests to Zomba:

- Collins Classics - Opened in 1989, closed in 1998.
- Connoisseur Collection - Released high quality, mid price compilation.
- Music For Nations - Metal/hard-rock label that closed in 2004.
- Pinnacle Entertainment - Entertainment group largely known for being the largest UK distributor of independent record labels.
- Rough Trade (80% of Rough Trade Records Germany/Switzerland/Austria and 100% of Rough Trade Benelux) - German distributor and label group.
- Windsong Exports - Exporter of music and film/TV.
- Windsong in Concert - Windsong's collection of "BBC in Concert" recordings.

Rough Trade GSA was renamed Zomba Records GmbH, while the Benelux operation (which only had distribution at the time) was absorbed into Zomba Distribution. The Rough Trade name only remained as an imprint of Zomba Records GmbH. Before being absorbed into BMG's operations, Zomba Records GmbH consisted of the following regional labels, most of which focused on electronic dance music:

- Advanced
- Air
- Form & Function
- Our Choice
- Reihe Ego
- Rough Trade
- World Service

Zomba Records GmbH was integrated into BMG's German operation along with the other regional offices. The Rough Trade name was later reacquired by Geoff Travis and Jeanette Lee who eventually continued it independently. When BMG restructured Zomba in 2003, Windsong/Pinnacle was moved under Bertelsmann's Arvato AG. Through a management buyout, Windsong/Pinnacle gained its independence in early 2008, but was forced into administration late in the year due to the 2008 financial crisis.

==== Zomba International Records Group ====
Zomba International Records Group managed the various regional branches opened as early as 1997 and as late as 2003. The group served to solidify the operations in these regions, some of which already had small offices with activities from scouting, promoting (such as Sweden), or as much as distribution for smaller labels or operating a few regional record labels (such as Germany). Following the BMG purchase, all of the remaining regional labels (with the exception of the main US and UK offices) and the Zomba International Records Group activities were merged with their respective local BMG offices in mid-2003.

| Name | Opened | Distributor[1] | Location | Director |
|---|---|---|---|---|
| Zomba Records Australia Pty. Ltd. | 24 May 1999 | Sony Australia | Sydney, Australia | Scott Murphy (March 1999 - Feb. 2001); Paul Paoliello (1 March 2001 - ?) |
| Zomba Records (Canada) Inc. | 1 July 1999 | BMG Canada | Toronto | Laura Bartlett |
| Zomba Records APRO Pty Ltd. (also called Zomba Records Singapore) | 1 July 1999 | BMG Singapore | Singapore | Julius Ng |
| Zomba Records GmbH (Germany) | 8 July 1999[2] | Zomba Distribution | Köln, Germany | |
| Zomba Records GesmbH | 8 July 1999[2] | Zomba Distribution | Vienna, Austria | |
| Zomba Records GmbH (Switzerland) | 8 July 1999[2] | Zomba Distribution | Zurich, Switzerland | |
| Zomba Records Benelux | 8 July 1999[2] | Zomba Distribution | Hilversum, Netherlands | Bert Meyer (1999–2003) |
| Zomba Records France SARL | 1 October 1999 | Virgin | Paris, France | |
| Zomba Records Scandinavia AB[3] | 1999 | Virgin | Stockholm, Sweden | Bert Meyer (1999-??); Magnus Bohman (main office, 2000–2001); Kenneth Ruiz-Davila (Norway, 2000–2001; GM of region after 2001-09-03) |
| Zomba Record Holdings BV | 1999 | Zomba Distribution | Brussels, Belgium | Thierry Thielemens |
| Zomba Records New Zealand Ltd. | 1 July 2000 | BMG New Zealand | Auckland, New Zealand | Morrie Smith |
| Zomba Records Korea Ltd. | 1 July 2000 | Rock Records | Seoul, Korea | Chang-Hak Lee |
| Zomba Records Espana SA | 1 July 2000 | Virgin | Madrid, Spain | Andres Ochaita |
| Zomba Records Italy SRL | 1 July 2000 | Virgin | Milan, Italy | Roberto Biglia |
| Zomba Records Japan KK | 1 October 2000 | CBS/Sony (First); Alfa Records (Second); BMG Victor (Third); Avex (Fourth) | Tokyo, Japan | Tak Kitazawa |
| Zomba Records Portugal | 1 July 2001 | Valentim de Carvalho | Lisbon, Portugal | Andres Ochaita |
| Zomba Records Brasil Ltda. | 1 July 2001 | Virgin (first); Som Livre (second) | Rio de Janeiro, Brazil | Martin Davis |

- [1]: Distribution information in this chart is from approximately 1999 until the BMG integration.
- [2]: Zomba Records in Germany, Austria, Switzerland and Benelux had been in operation as Rough Trade since Zomba had acquired the company in 1996. 8 July 1999 marks the date the Rough Trade name was dropped in favor of Zomba.
- [3]: The Scandinavian operations started with offices in Norway and Denmark. When Kenneth Ruiz-Davila was appointed the head of Zomba Scandinavia in September 2001, the Swedish offices were also moved under the larger company. The Denmark and Norway operations later closed on 1 July 2002, leaving the Swedish office remaining.

==== Other inactive/former labels ====
Aside from those listed above, other labels that have been associated with Zomba over the years are listed below.

- Associated Production Music (APM) - Production music library and music services company. Was initially a joint venture between Zomba/Jive and EMI. Still operating as a joint venture between Sony and Universal (successor to EMI and Zomba/Jive production music companies).
- Conifer Records Ltd. - Classical label formed in 1977, purchased by Zomba in 1992 and sold to BMG in 1996.
- Internal Affairs
- Trademark Records - Formed under Zomba Records Australia.
- X-Over Recordings - Formed under Zomba Records Australia.
- Zed Beat
- Zomba Production Music - UK-based supplier of Library and Production Music intended for professional use and not released to the general public. They released music through these various sublabels. Not to be confused with Zomba Productions Ltd. which is an earlier name of Zomba Recording Corporation. Currently operating as part of Universal Production Music.
  - Chappell Recording Music Library
  - Bruton Music - Label of the Bruton Music Group purchased by Zomba in 1985.
  - Firstcom Music Inc.
  - Galerie
  - Connect 2 Music
- Zomba Special Projects - Imprint established in 1997 for specific projects like releases sold through McDonald's restaurants.
- Zomba Video - Imprint used for music-related video releases.
- Under Jive
  - Battery Records - Unrelated to the current Battery Records, this was a dance label active in the nineties.
  - Dance Jive - Dance label active in the early 2000s.
  - EBUL - Record label owned by Pete Waterman Entertainment Ltd. and Jive. The label was largely used to release material by Steps.
  - Jive Afrika - Created in 1984 for release of South African material (most prominently, Hugh Masekela).
  - Jive House - Formed in the mid-nineties for house music.
  - Pepper Records - Formed in the late nineties.
  - Violator Records - Purchased by Jive in 2003. New York hip-hop label run by Chris Lighty and Mona Scott.
  - Worx Records - Formed in the mid nineties for electronic music.

=== Publishing division ===
Zomba Music Publishing Ltd. (sometimes colloquially referred to as Zomba Music or Zomba Music Publishing Group) is the publishing division of the Zomba Group of Companies. Initially known as Zomba Enterprises Inc., the division officially changed names in 1994 and became the Zomba Umbrella Company for Publishing. Since then, Zomba Enterprises is the name used for Zomba's ASCAP affiliate, while Zomba Music Inc. is the name of the BMI affiliate. The holding company that controls most Zomba publishing interests is called Zomba Music Holdings BV. David Mantel has been the president of Zomba Music Publishing since 2005, when he took over for Richard Blackstone. Tim Smith is the GM of the UK affiliate Zomba Music Publishing Ltd. There are various other publishing entities under Zomba, some of which are vast libraries acquired over the years, and some of which are small groups, sometimes representing a single artist. Below is a list of Zomba's publishing subsidiaries:

- Bluey Tunes Productions Ltd. (England)
- Brentwood Music Inc.
- Brentwood-Benson Music Publishing Inc.
- Bruton Music Ltd.
- Firstcom Music Inc. (US)
- Firstcommusic Inc. (US)
- Grantsville Publishing Ltd. (England)
- Grever International S.A. (Texas)
- Marlowlynn Ltd. (England)
- M56 Publishing Ltd. (England)
- Street Music Ltd. (England)
- Take Out Music Publishing Ltd. (England)
- Zomba Enterprises Inc.
- Zomba Golden Sands Enterprises, Inc.
- Zomba Melodies Inc. (New York)
- Zomba Music Inc. (New York)
- Zomba Music Publishers Ltd. (England)
- Zomba Silver Sands Enterprises Inc. (Texas)
- Zomba Songs Inc. (New York)

Zomba has limited activity in the classical music publishing sector; however, they are quite active in the pop music publishing and music production. At the time of the BMG purchase, Zomba had pop music publishing operations located in the UK and Benelux, while every other territory was sub-published with BMG. Production music operations were located in the UK and France with smaller operations in Sweden and the Netherlands. In Germany and Austria, Zomba and BMG owned publishing rights through jointly owned companies. Finally, in Spain and Italy, Zomba compositions were licensed exclusively to BMG.

In mid-2003, BMG integrated Zomba's publishing to form BMG-Zomba Music Publishers. In 2007, Vivendi purchased the BMG-Zomba publishing company and placed it within Universal Music Publishing Group, becoming the world's largest music publishing business. For antitrust reasons, Universal divested the European rights to the Zomba catalogue to a new company named Imagem. In 2017, Imagem was acquired by Concord Music Group.

=== Management companies ===
Zomba's first enterprise was a management company in London called Zomba Management and Publishers, with Mutt Lange as one of their first clients. His success allowed the company to expand, and eventually the companies split into two entities, creating Zomba Management. Zomba management represents music producers and artists. Zomba Screen Music was formed in 1997 as a management company for film composers. In May 2001, Zomba created Ingenuity Entertainment, a full-service management company for artists, producers, composers and music supervisors in the film and television industries. The Los Angeles-based company serviced both new and veteran artists, offering music production and business affairs services. Ingenuity Entertainment combined a management firm called Ingenuity with Zomba Screen Music.

=== Film/television services ===
Most of Zomba's activities in the film and television industry were music related. Zomba Screen Music was their full-service management company for film and television composers. In addition to management, Zomba! Music Services was formed in 1989 as a division offering prerecorded music and publishing services for soundtracks, television and commercials. This also had the effect of promoting Zomba music through the television and film industry. In 1995, Zomba purchased the well-established Segue Music Inc., a film and television music editing company providing music supervision, temp tracks, prerecords, playbacks and soundtrack production. Zomba also had a joint operation with Portman Entertainment called Portman Music, a soundtrack related company Coombe Music International Ltd., and a small film production company called Zomba Films. In 2005, Zomba began SEE Music, a joint venture with the recently combined BMG/Zomba Publishing and FirstCom Music specifically for motion picture advertising.

== See also ==
- List of record labels

== Resources ==
- Cohen, Jane; Bob Grossweiner (6 July 2007). "Industry Profile: Ralph Simon". CelebrityAccess.com.
- Knopper, Steve (2009). Appetite for Self-Destruction: The Spectacular Crash of the Record Industry in the Digital Age. New York: Free Press. (primarily Chapter 3)
- Pederson, Jay (2003). International Directory of Company Histories. Vol. 52. New York: St. James Press. ISBN 978-1-55862-482-5.
- Scott, Ajax (August 1996). "Clive Calder". Music Business International. 6 (4).
- White, Timothy (5 May 2001). "Billboard: The International Newsweekly of Music, Video and Home Entertainment" (PDF). Billboard. Vol. 113, no. 18. (this issue features a "Special Report" with multiple articles about Zomba)
