= Yizo Yizo (soundtrack) =

Soundtracks for a South African TV drama

Soundtrack album by Various artists
- Released: 2000
- Genre: Kwaito/Hip hop
- Label: CCP / EMI

Three Yizo Yizo soundtrack albums were produced through CCP Records to accompany the teen drama TV Show Yizo Yizo. They mainly consist of Kwaito music.

== Yizo Yizo ==
The first Yizo Yizo soundtrack was released in 2000. It was certified platinum by the Recording Industry of South Africa (RISA). This album was released on cassette tape as well as CD. Later, EMI released it to a streaming service.

== Track listing ==
Yizo Yizo (Soundtrack) — Standard edition
No.	Title	Producer(s)	Length
1.	"Tlo Be Rele Daar"	Kaybee
2.	"Yizo Yizo"	Kyllex
3.	"The Good And The Bad"	Kaybee
4.	"Masukela"	Kaybee
5.	"I Don't Want"	Kaybee
6.	"Uzama U Kwenzani"	Kaybee
7.	"Mamgobhozi"	Kyllex
8.	"Mi House"	Kaybee
9.	"Hurtin'"	Kaybee
10.	"Da Struggle Kontinues"	Ishmael Morabe
11.	"Masukela (Remix)"	Kaybee

=== Certifications ===
Region	Certification	Sales
South Africa (RiSA)	Platinum	40,000±

== Yizo Yizo 2 ==
Yizo Yizo 2

Soundtrack album by Various artists
- Released: April 15, 2002
- Genre: Kwaito/Hip hop
- Label: CCP / EMI

Yizo Yizo 2 was released in 2002. It was also certified platinum by the RISA.

=== Track listing ===
No.	Title	Length
1.	"Ghetto Fabulous" (Zola & Kaybee)	4:38
2.	"Sorry Sarge" (Mandoza & GP MaOrange)	4:39
3.	"The Good & The Bad (Part 2)" (Ishmael & Amu)	4:48
4.	"Sure Ntombazana (Bloma Nice)" (Thembi Seete & Wanda)	5:34
5.	"Yizo" (Arthur)	5:10
6.	"Umhlaba Uyahlaba" (Chiskop & Mandoza)	4:44
7.	"Weekend Special" (Brenda Fassie & The Big Dudes)	4:41
8.	"Uzonqoba" (Zola & Nana)	3:50
9.	"Avulekile Amasango" (Ishmael)	4:04
10.	"Starring" (Doc Shebeleza)	4:49
11.	"Chincha Golova" (Kyllex & Wanda)	4:37
12.	"I Don't Understand" (Ishmael & Wanda)	5:42
13.	"Cela Uzophiwa" (Nana)	3:53
14.	"No Title" (Unknown Artist)	4:59
Total length:		49:19

=== Accolades ===
Year	Award ceremony	Prize	Result	Ref
"Yizo Yizo 2"	2002	8th South African Music Awards	Best Album of the Year	Won
“Ghetto Fabulous”	2002	Metro FM Music Awards	Song of the Year	Won

=== Certifications ===
Region	Certification	Sales
South Africa (RiSA)	Platinum	50,000±

== Yizo Yizo 3 ==
Yizo Yizo 3

Soundtrack album by Various artists
- Released: March 15, 2004
- Genre: Kwaito/Hip hop
- Label: CCP / EMI
- Producer: Philip Miller (exec.)

Yizo Yizo 3 was released in 2004, at the beginning of Yizo Yizo's third season.

== Track listing ==
No.	Title	Length
1.	"I Life" (H2O)	4:39
2.	"Amasoja" (Bouga Luv & Brown Dash Feat. Mzekezeke)	5:21
3.	"Yizo Yizo" (Brenda Fassie)	5:28
4.	"Respect Life" (Mandoza)	4:12
5.	"Klaima" (Skwatta Kamp)	3:50
6.	"What A Mess" (Bobo And Gunman)	4:11
7.	"Sho'sgebengu" (Slovaz)	4:06
8.	"Korobela" (Ndrebele Civilization)	5:32
9.	"Zandisile" (Simphiwe Dana)	5:59
10.	"Emasimini" (Halfbrick)	3:35
11.	"Motho Wa Mmona Moss" (West 2)	4:27
12.	"Themba Lami" (DJ Kenny Bee)	4:21
13.	"Ori Wa A Dara" (Fatai Rolling Dollar)	5:29
14.	"Plaza Funk" (DJ 2mza & Toki M)	5:05
15.	"8-3-1 (I Love You)" (Cashless Society)	4:35
16.	"Ilitye (Yizo Theme)" (Simphiwe Dana)	4:53
17.	"She Left The Tap Open" (Makhaolo Ndebele / Kgafela Oa Magogodi)	1:02
Total length:		49:19

=== Release history ===
List of release dates, showing region, formats, label, editions and reference
Region	Date	Format(s)	Label	Edition(s)	Ref.
Worldwide	March 16, 2004	CD; digital download; Vinyl	CCP Records/EMI	Standard	
