= Black President (Brenda Fassie album) =

Studio album by Brenda Fassie
- Released: March 9, 1990
- Recorded: 1989–1990, Johannesburg
- Length: 37:30
- Label: CCP Records
- Producer: Sello Twala

Brenda Fassie chronology
Brenda (1989)	Black President (1990)	I Am Not a Bad Girl (1991)

Black President is the sixth studio album by South African singer Brenda Fassie. It was released on March 9, 1990, by CCP Records. The album was her sixth release for the CCP Records and is her more political record to date.

Black President was generally received with favorable reviews by music critics. The album is especially notable because it features the Anti Apartheid anthem the title song of the albums Black President, a protest against the imprisonment of Nelson Mandela and his comrades by the apartheid government.

== Background ==
The songs from the album were written around Mandela's release from prison, who was held for 27 years for political activities by apartheid South African government.

== Track listing ==
Adapted from Allmusic.

No.	Title	Writer(s)	Length
1.	"I Won't Run"	Colbert Mukwevho Sello "Chicco" Twala Brenda Fassie	5:07
2.	"Bump Bump"	Twala; Fassie	4:52
3.	"Stay Away [From My Man]"	Brenda Fassie; Twala	3:33
4.	"Heroes Party"	Colbert Mukwevho; D. Nkosi; Fassie	5:11
5.	"Shoot Them Before They Grow"	Mukwevho; Twala	3:01
6.	"Black President"	Fassie; Mukwevho; Twala	4:26
7.	"Street Girl"	Twala	3:34
8.	"Bump Party Time"	Twala	3:27

== Personnel ==
- Brenda Fassie - Lead vocalist
- Richard Mitchell - Co-producer, Engineer
- Rob Scrooby/Scrooby Do - Photography By, Design [Sleeve]
- Sello Chicco - Producer, Arranged By, Arranged By [Vocal]
- Colbert Mukwevho - Additional writing (track 1)
