= Yo Baby =

Yo baby

Studio album by Brenda Fassie
- Released: November 6, 1992
- Recorded: November 1991–August 1992
- Genres: Pop; House; Hip-hop; R&B
- Length: 53:51
- Label: CCP Records
- Producers: B. Fassie (exec.); Selwyn Shandel

Brenda Fassie chronology
I Am Not a Bad Girl (1991)	Yo baby (1992)	Mama (1993)

Yo baby is the seventh studio album of South African singer Brenda Fassie released on November 6, 1992 by CCP Records. Lyrically, the album, is composed of songs about love, dancing, getto life and relationships. The album became Fassie highest-selling album, and it spawned successful singles such as "Istraight Lendaba", "Boipatong",

In lyrics of the song "Boipatong", Fassie responds to the Boipatong massacre (June 14, 1992), which saw 42 township residents killed, in the song she sends condolences to those who lost their love ones. On the song "Istraight Le Ndaba", Lyrically it discusses two situations; Firstly on the song she addressed the issue of jackrolling which was a huge social issue back then and secondly she is telling people to mind their business specifically the Media and to "let her live her life".

== Production ==
The album has more Pop music influences than the previous album, I am not a Bad Girl, which incorporated more House music and Afropop. The album was produced by Selwyn Shandel, who also produced the previous album. Fassie and Shandel served as executive producers of the album.

== Release ==
The album was first released in South Africa on July 27, 1992 by CCP Records. On 20 October 2009, the album was re-released by EMI Music South Africa (Pty) in digital form.

== Track list ==
No.	Title	Writer(s)	Length
1.	"Yo Baby"	B. Fassie; S. Shandel	04:51
2.	"Istraight Lendaba"	B. Fassie; S. Shandel	07:10
3.	"Call Me Up"	S. Shandel	04:45
4.	"Boipatong"	B. Fassie; S. Shandel	04:04
5.	"Buti Lo"	B. Fassie; S. Shandel	00:05
6.	"Give Love to the World"	B. Fassie; S. Shandel	04:45
7.	"Natural Instinct"	S. Shandel	04:19
8.	"Istraight Le Ndaba (Remix)"	B. Fassie; S. Shandel	03:53
Total length:			39:48

== Personnel ==
=== Musicians ===
- Brenda Fassie - Vocals
- Tshepo Tshola - Additional Vocals (Track 4)

==== Production ====
- Brenda Fassie – producer (all tracks), executive producer
- Selwyn Shandel - producer
