= Black President (song) =

1990 song by Brenda Fassie

Single by Brenda Fassie

from the album Black President
- Released: February 7, 1990
- Genre: Afropop
- Length: 4:26
- Label: CCP Records
- Songwriters: Brenda Fassie; Sello "Chicco" Twala; Colbert Mukwevho
- Producer: Twala

Music video
- "Weekend Special" on YouTube

Audio sample
- "Black President": file; help

Black President is a song by South African singer Brenda Fassie. It is the sixth track on her sixth studio album, Black President (1990), It was written by Sello "Chicco" Twala, Brenda Fassie, and produced by Twala and released on February 8, 1990 through CCP Records.

The song was written about Nelson Mandela, who was arrested by the South African apartheid government with his comrades.

== Background ==
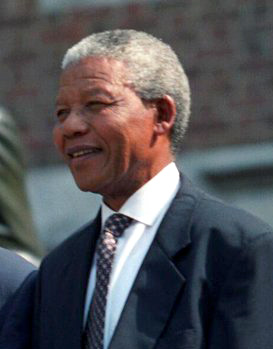
Nelson Mandela at the Independence Hall in Philadelphia, PA, July 4, 1993.

The song was one of the tracks that were written around Mandela's release from prison, who was imprisoned in Robben Island (1963–1990) for involvement in political activities in South Africa. The details of Mandela's release described in the song were speculative, as the song's release predated Mandela's by 4 days.

== Music video ==
The accompanying music video for Black President released in 1990 includes photographs and tribute clips of Nelson Mandela. It was later made available through YouTube.
