= Clive Calder =

South African record executive (born 1946)

- Born: Clive Ian Calder; 13 December 1946 (age 79); Johannesburg, Transvaal, Union of South Africa
- Citizenship: British citizenship and South African citizenship - dual citizenship
- Occupation: Businessman
- Years active: 1971–2003
- Known for: Co-founder, Zomba Group
- Spouse: Patricia
- Children: 2

Clive Ian Calder (born 13 December 1946) is a South African-British billionaire record executive and businessman primarily known for co-founding the Zomba Group with Ralph Simon, and its subsidiary Jive Records. As of 2026, Calder has an estimated net worth of US$9.89 billion according to Bloomberg Billionaires Index & Forbes.

== Early life ==
Calder was born in and grew up in Johannesburg, Transvaal, Union of South Africa.

== Career ==
Calder started his first record company in 1971 in South Africa with Ralph Simon. By 1975, Calder and Simon had relocated to London and established Zomba as an artist and producer management company. By 1978, Zomba had expanded to include music publishing and opened offices in New York City. In 1981 Calder and Simon formed their first record label Jive, and Calder began to create a name for Jive as an important outlet for hip hop and rap music with the help of new hire Barry Weiss.

Jive's success was followed by Silvertone Records in 1988 and countless others throughout the nineties. After an unspecified "ethical disagreement," Calder bought Simon's stake in Zomba and became the sole owner in 1990. In the late nineties, Jive expanded its success to include teen pop phenomenons such as the Backstreet Boys, *NSYNC and Britney Spears, all of which topped the charts. In 2002 he sold Zomba for US$2.74 billion to the German-based media group Bertelsmann. Though Calder was offered a position within the newly restructured Zomba Label Group, he instead chose to stay on temporarily as an advisor during the integration period, and eventually left the music business in 2003. The Zomba Label Group, which had been founded by BMG as parent for all Zomba labels in 2004, was integrated with all its labels into BMG Label Group in 2007, while at the same time the Zomba brand ceased to exist. In 2009 the group was renamed as RCA/Jive Label Group under Sony Music, and in October 2011, Jive Records, as well as the whole Jive brand, was discontinued, with their most successful artists being moved to RCA Records and partly to Epic Records. In May 2018, The Washington Post reporter Geoff Edgers wrote "The Star Treatment", a lengthy article alleging music industry executives' willful blindness to label artist R. Kelly's sexually abusive behavior toward underage girls. Edgers reported that as early as 1994, Kelly's tour manager urged Calder to tell Kelly he would not release the singer's records if he continued to have "incidents" with young women and minors after every concert he gave. Calder told the Post that he regretted not having done more at the time, saying "Clearly, we missed something."

In 2018, Calder and his son Keith invested $46 million into Cloud Imperium Games, taking a 10% stake in the studio behind the Star Citizen game.

== Personal life ==
Calder is married to Patricia Calder, with whom he has two children. They live in the Cayman Islands.

In May 2020, the ELMA Group of Foundations, which was founded by Calder and supports children's health and education initiatives around the world, pledged $107 million to fight COVID-19 in Africa. Around $26 million of this was allocated to fight the pandemic in South Africa, his birth country.
