= Weekend Special =

1983 debut single by Brenda and the Big Dudes

Single by Brenda and the Big Dudes

from the album Weekend Special
- B-side: "Life Is Going On"
- Released: February 1983
- Genre: R&B; pop
- Length: 3:56 (single version); 5:39 (remix version)
- Label: EMI; CCP
- Songwriter(s): Melvyn Matthews
- Producer(s): Blondie Makhene; Melvyn Matthews

Music video
- "Weekend Special" on YouTube

"Weekend Special" is the debut single by the South African recording group Brenda and the Big Dudes taken from their debut studio album Weekend Special (1983). It was written by Melvyn Matthews, as was the B-side "Life Is Going On". "Weekend Special" features production by Blondie Makhene (one half of the 1970s duo Blondie & Pappa) and Matthews.

The song was released by EMI Records as a maxi single titled "Weekend Special", in February 1983. The single was successful commercially and became one of Brenda's signature songs.

"Weekend Special" had an extended life in cover versions and remixes, including one by New York producer Van Gibbs in 1986 that spent eight weeks on Billboard magazine's Hot Black Singles chart. The song's international success led to Fassie touring the United States, Europe, Australia, and Brazil. As a full album, Weekend Special continues to sell well as a collector's item.

== Background ==
In 1980, Anneline Malebo, one of the singers from the group Joy went on maternity leave. Fassie, a vocalist from Langa, Cape Town, who lived with producer Hendrick "Koloi" Lebona, was wooed by Joy's management to stand in for Malebo. Following the return of Malebo, Brenda left the band and joined Blondie and Papa [Makhene] as a backup singer before starting her own band, Brenda and the Big Dudes.

== Writing and production ==
"Weekend Special" was written and produced by a Port Elizabeth based songwriter and producer Melvyn Matthews. In 1983, Matthews met his idol Blondie Makhene (one half of the duo Blondie & Pappa) who invited him to an audition. Matthews' rendition of the self-penned song "I Must Be Out of My Mind" impressed Makhene, who teamed up with Matthews leading to the birth of "Weekend Special", which became a South African pop classic that shot Brenda Fassie to fame.

== Commercial performance ==
By the spring of 1983, "Weekend Special" had received enough promotion in townships to catch the attention of DJs, achieving multi-platinum status sales in excess of 200,000 copies as the fastest selling single of that year. It peaked at number 72 on the Hot R&B/Hip-Hop Songs chart and remained there for eight weeks. It also topped the charts in South America, Europe and Australia. In the United Kingdom, it was remixed by Ian Levine. The song was popular in both underground radios and clubs in the United Kingdom, United States and South Africa. As a full album, Weekend Special continues to sell well as a collector's item and enjoys enduring popularity among a new generation of music lovers.

== Remix ==
"Weekend Special" received a variety of cover versions and remixes notably by the American singer Van Gibbs of Capitol Records, whose version was recorded in New York's Right Track Studios and spent eight weeks on the US Hot R&B/Hip-Hop Songs chart and reached a peak of number 72. In the United Kingdom, it was remixed by Ian Levine.

== Live performance ==
Following the song's release, Brenda Fassie and the Big Dudes promoted the song in township shebeens to catch the attention of the DJs. Brenda and the Big Dudes performed the song in front of a hundred thousand people who paid R4 each to watch her play at Ellis Park Stadium at the second Concert in the Park in a "promotional tour with EMI" organized by EMI to promote the album. Margaret Singana and The Rockets were backstage with The Soul Brothers.

== Music video ==
A music video was released later after the song's success. On 26 November 2015, it received 257,860 views on YouTube. The video features Brenda and the Big Dudes performing the song in front of hundred thousand people in Ellis Park, Johannesburg in support of the Operation Hunger aid on 12 January 1985. Another video was uploaded on YouTube published on 10 November 2006 featuring Brenda with the Big Dudes singing the song in a club; the video received 174,451 views.

== Charts ==
=== Weekly charts ===
Chart (1986)	Peak position
U.S. Billboard Hot R&B/Hip-Hop Singles & Tracks	72
