= Tshepo Ngwane =

South African actor

- Born: 21 July 1974; Ermelo, South Africa
- Died: 27 October 2015 (aged 41); Soweto, South Africa
- Occupation: Actor
- Years active: 1998–2015

Tshepo Ngwane (21 July 1974 – 27 October 2015) was a South African actor most famous for his role as Thiza Mathizozo on the South African television drama series Yizo Yizo.
