= RCA/Jive Label Group discography =

This is a list of releases in which RCA/Jive Label Group is the copyright holder. The appropriate sub label is also listed.

| Cat. No. | Label | Artist | Title | Release date YYYY-MM-DD | Notes |
|---|---|---|---|---|---|
| 88697-47319-2 | J | Daniel Merriweather | Love & War | 2009-06-01 | Album |
| n/a | Jive | Backstreet Boys | "Bigger" | 2009-11-29 | Digital release |
| 88697-58503-2 | Arista | Whitney Houston | "Million Dollar Bill" | 2009-10 | Single |
| 88697-60681-2 | Jive | Britney Spears | "3" | 2009-10 | Single |
| 88697-60954-2 | Jive | Britney Spears | "3" | 2009-10 | Single |
| 88697-61936-2 | RCA | Them Crooked Vultures | Them Crooked Vultures | 2009-11-13 | Album |
| 88697-59686-2 | Jive | Backstreet Boys | "Straight Through My Heart" | 2009-09 | Remixes |
| 88697-52068-2 | LaFace | Ciara Featuring Justin Timberlake | "Love Sex Magic" | 2009-05-01 | Enhanced single |
| 88697-10033-2 | Arista | Whitney Houston | I Look To You | 2009-08-28 | Album |
| 88697-59618-2 | Jive | Backstreet Boys | This Is Us | 2009-10-05 | Album |
| 88697-58088-2 | Jive | Backstreet Boys | This Is Us | 2009-10-05 | Album w/ DVD |
