= Bus boycotts in South Africa =

Public transport protests in South Africa

Bus boycotts in South Africa were a series of protests that took place in the Union of South Africa and in the present Republic of South Africa against increasing prices of transport fees and segregating practices during the Apartheid to the present.

== Background ==
In 1940 South African authorities passed the Electoral Laws Amendment Act, which provided for the compulsory registration of White voters only. The Act had been the focus of protests by the African People's Organization. The African National Congress (ANC) established a Department of Social Welfare to investigate the needs of the increasingly urban population. In early August 1943, the bus fare in Alexandra Township increased from four to five cents, sparking a boycott of 20,000 individuals, including Nelson Mandela. The boycott lasted nine days until the local bus company conceded and lowered the fare back to its original price. Along with the lowered fare, the boycott lead to the commission of inquiry regarding bus fare affordability. The following year, despite the commission's evidence indicating the majority of urban Africans could not afford the five-cent fare, the government gave permission to bus companies to increase the fare to five cents. This caused another boycott, this time lasting seven weeks, in Alexandra.

== 1957 Alexandra bus boycott ==
On 7 January 1957 workers from Johannesburg and Pretoria townships began a boycott of PUTCO, due to the company increasing fares by 25% (one penny at that time) in order to get them out of a continuous financial crisis. This spontaneous act marked the start of a three-month period during which an estimated 70,000 workers joined in the action, which became known as the 1957 Alexandra bus boycott. PUTCO was forced to rescind the increase in the bus fare.

== Egerton railway station bus boycott massacre ==
On 18 July 1983, Mdantsane and East London communities embarked on a bus boycott to protest an unannounced five cent increase in bus fares. The residents abandoned the partly Ciskei government-owned Ciskei Transport Corporation (CTC) buses for taxis and trains. On 4 August 1983, the Ciskei police tried to prevent residents from taking the train at Egerton train station in Mdantsane. After hesitating, the crowd advanced a few paces. However, as the police drew their guns, the people stopped. Without warning, the police fired into the crowd killing 11 and injuring 36 commuters, leading to what is now known as the Egerton railway station bus boycott massacre, the Mdantsane bus boycott massacre, the Egerton massacre, and similar terms.

== See also ==
- Anti-Apartheid Movement
- Apartheid
- PUTCO
- Montgomery bus boycott
- Defiance Campaign
- Human rights in South Africa
