= Mel Lewinter =

American music industry executive

Mel Lewinter (born 1941) is an American music industry executive. He is executive vice president of label strategy at Sony Music Entertainment.

== Career ==
Lewinter has held several important positions within the music industry, working at Warner Music Group, Universal Music Group and now Sony Music Entertainment. He was vice chairman of the Atlantic Group. Lewinter also had high-ranking positions at Warner Music Group. He was executive vice president of their US division and also was the chief operating officer of Warner Music Group.

Lewinter was also vice chairman of MCA Music Entertainment Group. More recently he was chairman and CEO of Universal Motown and then became chairman and CEO of Universal Motown Republic Group.

He is the executive vice president of label strategy at Sony Music Entertainment. Doug Morris announced that he had appointed to this position in October 2011.

Preceded by -	Executive Vice President of Label Strategy; Sony Music Entertainment; October 11, 2011-?	Succeeded by incumbent
Preceded by -	Chairman & CEO; Universal Motown Republic Group; 1999-2011	Succeeded by Barry Weiss
