= Brenda and the Big Dudes =

South African recording group

- Brenda and the Big Dudes in 1984

Background information
- Also known as: The Big Dudes
- Origin: Johannesburg, South Africa
- Genres: Afropop
- Years active: 1983–1987
- Labels: Family Records; EMI; CCP Records
- Past members: Brenda Fassie; Desmond Malotana; Dumisane Ngubeni; Rufus Klaas; David Mabaso; Fats Mlangeni

Brenda and the Big Dudes was a South African recording group formed in 1983. The group's classic line up included Brenda Fassie (Vocals), Desmond Malotana (Keyboards), Dumisane Ngobeni (Keyboards), Job "Fats" Mlangeni (Drums), David Mabaso (Bass) and Rufus Klaas (Guitar). The group rose to fame after the release of their debut maxi-single Weekend Special in 1983. The single became the best selling record in South Africa with sales of over 200,000 copies. The group was initially a backing band for another popular South African duo Blondie & Pappa until a young Brenda Fassie was brought in as a lead singer. The group would also gain international prominence after Weekend Special was remixed by Van Gibbs in 1986. This version entered the Hot R&B/Hip-Hop Songs chart where it peaked at number 72 on April 12, 1986, and spent 8 weeks in the chart.

== Members ==
- Brenda Fassie – vocals
- Desmond Malotana – keyboards
- Dumisane Ngubeni – keyboards
- David Mabaso – bass
- Rufus Klaas – guitar
- Job "Fats" Mlangeni – drums

== Discography ==
=== Studio albums ===
- Weekend Special (1983)
- Let's Stick Together (1984)
- Higher and Higher (1985)
- No! No! Señor (1986)

=== Extended plays ===
- Cool Spot (1984)
- Touch Somebody (1985)

=== Singles ===
- Holiday (1984)
- Someone To Love (1984)
- Bongani (1985)
- Amalahle (1987)

== See also ==
- Afropop
- Music of the African diaspora
- Music of Africa
