= Brenda Fassie =

South African pop singer (1964–2004)

Background information
- Also known as: MaBrrr
- Born: Brenda Nokuzola Fassie; 3 November 1964; Langa, Cape, South Africa
- Died: 9 May 2004 (aged 39) Johannesburg, Gauteng, South Africa
- Genres: Pop; kwaito; R&B; Champeta; Township Disco; Afropop
- Occupations: Singer-songwriter; dancer; activist
- Years active: 1981–2004
- Label: CCP
- Formerly of: Brenda and the Big Dudes

Brenda Nokuzola Fassie (3 November 1964 – 9 May 2004) was a South African singer-songwriter, dancer, and activist. Affectionately called MaBrrr by her fans, she is also known as the "Queen of African Pop" or the "Madonna of the Townships". Fassie was a legendary figure in the South African music industry, celebrated for her powerful voice, captivating stage presence, and commitment to social justice, often called one of the most influential and greatest musicians on the African Continent. She produced songs that contributed to the influence of music genres such as pop and kwaito, with some of her work addressing social issues in South Africa. Despite her outrageous and controversial stage presence, her name, Nokuzola, means "quiet", "calm", or "peace".

== Biography ==
Fassie was born in Langa, Cape Town on 3 November 1964, the youngest of nine children. She was named after the American singer Brenda Lee. Her father (Matthew Mangaliso Fassie) died when she was only two years old. With the help of her mother (Makokosie Fassie), a pianist, Brenda was brought into music and by the age of five beginning to earn money by singing for tourists.

When she was 16 years old in 1981, she received a visit by Hendrick "Koloi" Lebona. As a result, she left Cape Town for Soweto, Johannesburg, to seek her fortune as a singer. This would become the start of her career when Fassie first joined the vocal group Joy (filling in for one of the members who was on maternity leave) and later became the lead singer for a township music group called Brenda and the Big Dudes. She had a son, Bongani, in 1985 by a fellow Big Dudes musician. She married Nhlanhla Mbambo in 1989 at the age of 24 years old, but the pair divorced in 1991. Around this time she became addicted to cocaine and her career suffered as a result.

With very outspoken views and frequent visits to the poorer townships of Johannesburg, as well as songs about life in the townships, Fassie enjoyed tremendous popularity. The music she made would go on to oppose the apartheid regime in South Africa. In 1990, she released the song "Black President" as a tribute to Nelson Mandela, a political prisoner and later the first Black president of South Africa. Additionally, after her tribute song to Nelson Mandela, Fassie was known to have a close personal relationship with him, and even is sometimes referred to as being his honorific niece. Both Mandela and Fassie came from the same ethnic background that being Xhosa. During Mandela's presidential inauguration in South Africa during 1994, Fassie performed her song Black President for him, a historic moment that brought her music to both a national and global audience. Fassie one of few contributing black artist that managed to remain out of exile during apartheid while making music addressing many South African social issue and even was able to have performances in the townships during this time.

Known best for her songs "Weekend Special" and "Too Late for Mama", Fassie was dubbed "The Madonna of the Townships" by Time magazine in 2001. She was given this nickname because at the time her popularity was as notable as the American singer Madonna. Fassie became embroiled in South Africa's first industry beef when she was targeted by a diss track by controversial rapper Senyaka in his 1993 song, "Ma-Gents". Many of Fassie's music was written in the multiple different languages she spoke from English, isiZulu, isiXhosa, to Sesotho.

In 1995, she was discovered in a hotel with the body of her female lover, Poppie Sihlahla, who had died of an apparent overdose. Fassie underwent rehabilitation and got her career back on track. However, she still had drug problems, and returned to drug rehabilitation clinics about 30 times in her life. From 1996 on she released several solo albums, including Now Is the Time (1996), Paparazzi (1997), Memeza (1998) and Nomakanjani (1999). Most of her albums became multi-platinum sellers in South Africa, of which Memeza was the best-selling album in South Africa in 1998.

== Legacy and impact ==
Brenda Fassie's queer identity has been cited for providing visibility for the LGBTQ+ community in South Africa. In Fassie's early life she described herself as being a tomboy not truly understanding the concepts of homosexuality. It was not until after, Fassie moved from Langa to Johannesburg when she could began identifying as Lesbian. Although Fassie had previous relationships with men, she later openly identified as a lesbian and stated that her sexuality allowed her to be “more interesting to people." Scholars today have noted that openly identifying as a black lesbian during late apartheid and earlier post-apartheid was complex because of the countries long history of heteronormativity and homophobia.

Fassie's sexuality has been discussed by its relations to social norms in South Africa at the time. In a 2003 interview, Fassie expressed her desire to marry her partner at the time, Sindi , stating that, "I'll have a proper marriage one day... We'll get married." This statement occurred three years before South Africa passed the Civil Union Act of 2006 that legalized same sex marriages. The country would become the first country in Africa to legalize same sex-marriage. Fassie's identity has been interpreted today through intersectionality from scholars, looking at the nature of race, gender, and sexuality in shaping her persona and artistic expression. Her evolving image, has been associated with the shift in perspectives of both the social-political and culture of South Africa from the late 80s to early 2000s.

Brenda Fassie's music and public role has been connected to resistance culture in Apartheid South Africa. Her 1990s song "Black President" written about Nelson Mandela who had been imprisoned, would become banned in South Africa. Though Nelson had been released from prison by the time the song hit the media, the song was prohibited by the state because it was seen as anti-apartheid. Many other songs from black artists during this time were increasingly becoming banned from the South African Broadcasting Corporation (SABC) or censored from public broadcasting by means of surveillance. This song has since become recognized as symbolic by scholars as it has extended influence beyond the years of apartheid.

In her song, "Sum’bulala" of 1997, Fassie addressed the issues of Taxi Wars in South Africa, an issue surrounding the violence amongst taxi operators in the townships. Her song brought awareness to this social issue affecting groups of people within the townships. Though her music itself gave voices to the people in her community, her activism did not function solely on formal activism for this time.

Fassie has been remembered for being free-spirited and by her stylish presence, at times wearing traditional African clothing in her concert performances. It has been said by scholars that it was not until after apartheid that black south Africans started to express themselves through the outfits they wore. During this time period scholars have noted that Xhosa people like Fassie chose to wear beaded accessories and clothing by means of showing African pride and even resistance to the colonial rule. In addition to her use of traditional attire, she has been remembered for her tank tops and bright 1980s inspired colours, which has been noted as influencing fashion trends among South African women during the time.

== Contributions to music genre ==
Brenda Fassie's music contributed to the influence and popularization of genres like Bubblegum and Kwaito in South Africa. In the 80's, most of Fassie's music was her contributing to bubblegum pop like her releasing the song "Weekend Special" that was a popular disco style song, that would go on making it to the billboards for Hot Black Singles chart. This song brought characteristics of pop, disco, and the township style together to create a song that fell under the genre of bubblegum pop in the 80s. Other songs like "Too Late for Mama" show her early musical style. Her music continued to remain upbeat and appealing to the South African audience throughout the 80's.

In the 1990s, Fassie's musical style evolved and influenced the genre of Kwaito where she began singing about controversial topics and intentionally using certain lyrics and dances to express herself. Kwaito is associated with the music of South African youth during post-apartheid, as it is described as dance music that aimed to be apolitical. As the genre had emerged, Fassie began using elements from this category in her own music reflecting the shift in political parties and music in South Africa. Songs such as "Nomakanjani" is connected to reflect the change in her musical style. Her contributions are cited by still being influential to South African music today. Today there is a statue of her that is in Newtown, Johannesburg, where Fassie is remembered to have resisted and revelled during her time as an artist.

== Death ==
On the morning of 26 April 2004, Fassie collapsed at her home in Buccleuch, Gauteng, and was admitted into a hospital in Sunninghill. The press were initially told that she had suffered cardiac arrest, but later reported that she had slipped into a coma as a result of an asthma attack. The post-mortem report revealed that Fassie had taken an overdose of cocaine on the night of her collapse, and this was the cause of her coma. She stopped breathing and suffered brain damage from lack of oxygen. Fassie was visited in the hospital by Nelson Mandela, Winnie Madikizela-Mandela, and Thabo Mbeki, and her condition was front-page news in South African papers. She died at age 39 on 9 May 2004 in hospital, without regaining consciousness, after her life support machines were turned off. Her family (including her son, Bongani Fassie, and her long-term partner - Gloria Chaka) were at her side when she died. Fassie was survived by her son, Bongani, who later entered into a legal battle over her estate and missing funds. It was alleged that about R25 million was unaccounted for, leading to a his dispute over the inheritance.

== Recognition ==
Fassie won Eleven South African Music Awards: Best Female Artist and Song of the Year in 1999, Best-Selling Release of the Decade and Best Song of the Decade in 2004, and Lifetime Achievement Award in 2005. She also won three Kora Awards: Most Promising Female Artist of Africa and Best Female Artist of Africa in 1996, and the Jury Special Award in 2001. She was voted 17th in the Top 100 Great South Africans.

Her son Bongani "Bongz" Fassie performed "I'm So Sorry", a song dedicated to his mother, on the soundtrack to the 2005 Academy Award-winning movie Tsotsi. In March 2006 a life-size bronze sculpture of Fassie by artist Angus Taylor was installed outside Bassline, a music venue in Johannesburg.

== Discography ==
Most of Fassie's records were issued by the EMI-owned CCP Records.

=== With Brenda and the Big Dudes ===
Year	Title	Format	Label
1983	Weekend Special	Studio album	CCP Records
1984	Cool Spot	EP	CCP Records
1984	Let's Stick Together	Studio album	CCP Records
1984	Someone To Love	Maxi single	CCP Records
1985	Higher and Higher	Studio album	CCP Records
1985	Touch Somebody	EP	CCP Records
1986	No No Señor	Studio album	CCP Records

=== Solo albums ===
Year	Title	Format	Label
1987	Brenda	Studio album	CCP Records
1987	Ag Shame Lovey	EP	CCP Records
1988	Umuntu Ngumuntu Ngabantu	EP	CCP Records
1989	Too Late for Mama	Studio album	CCP Records
1990	Black President	Studio album	CCP Records
1991	I Am Not a Bad Girl	Studio album	CCP Records
1992	Yo Baby	Studio album	CCP Records
1993	Mama	EP	CCP Records
1994	Abantu Bayakhuluma	Studio album	CCP Records
1995	Umuntu Uyashintsha	Studio album	CCP Records
1996	Now Is the Time	Studio album	CCP Records
1997	Paparazzi	Studio album	CCP Records
1998	Memeza	Studio album	CCP Records
1999	Nomakanjani	Studio album	CCP Records
2000	Amadlozi	Studio album	CCP Records
2001	Mina Nawe: Ngohlala Ngi Nje	Studio album	CCP Records
2002	Myekeleni	Studio album	CCP Records
2003	Mali	Studio album	CCP Records
2004	Gimme Some Volume	Studio album	CCP Records
2004	Greatest Hits: The Queen of African Pop (1964–2004)	Compilation album	CCP Records

Fassie also contributed to Mandoza's album Tornado (2002), Miriam Makeba's album Sangoma (1988), and Harry Belafonte's anti-apartheid album Paradise in Gazankulu (1988). She sang on two of the soundtrack albums for Yizo Yizo (both released in 2004).

== Awards and nominations ==
Year	Award	Category	Nominee / Work	Result	Ref.
1995	South African Music Awards	Best Vocal Performance — Female	Abantu Bayakhuluma	Won	
1996	Kora Awards	Most promising Female Artist of Africa	Herself	Won	

Year	Award	Category	Nominated work	Result
1999	South African Music Awards (SAMA)	Song of the Year	"Vulindlela"	Won
1999	South African Music Awards (SAMA)	Best Selling Release of the year	Memeza	Won
1999	South African Music Awards (SAMA)	Best Female Artist	Herself	Won
1999	Kora Awards	Best Female Artist of Africa	Herself	Won

Year	Award	Category	Nominated work	Result
2000	South African Music Awards (SAMA)	Song of the year	"Nomakanjani	Won
2000	South African Music Awards (SAMA)	Best selling Release of the Year	"Nomakanjani"	Won
2000	Duku Duku Awards	Most talked about personality of the year	Herself	Won

Year	Award	Category	Nominated work	Result
2001	South African Music Awards (SAMA)	Best Selling Release of the Year	Thola Amadlozi	Won
2001	Duku Duku Awards	Most talked about personality of the year	Herself	Won
2001	Kora Awards	Jury Special Award	Herself	Won

== See also ==
- Afro-pop
- Anti-apartheid music
