= Christopher Kubheka =

South African actor (1968–2017)

- Born: Jabu Christopher Kubheka; 1969; South Africa
- Died: 12 June 2017 (aged 48); Soshanguve, South Africa
- Resting place: Avalon Cemetery
- Occupations: Actor, Model
- Years active: 1989–2016
- Spouse: Cynthia Khumalo (m. 2010)
- Children: 24

Jabu Christopher Kubheka (1969 – 12 June 2017) was a South African actor and model. He is best known for the roles in the television serials such as Yizo Yizo, Zone 14 and Vat 'n Sit.

== Career ==
Kubheka started his acting career in Zola, Soweto at Positive Creative Arts in the late 1980s. In 1991, he made his film debut with the role "Xabo" in the film Crazy Safari directed by Billy Chan. In 1999, Kubheka joined with the season one of SABC1 drama serial Yizo Yizo. In the serial, he played the role as "Gunman for life”popularity until 2004. Then in 2005, he joined with the SABC1 drama series Zone 14 and played the supportive role of "Bazooka Khumba". His role became very popular among the public, where he continued to play the role for four seasons until 2011.

In 2014, he made the supportive role "Skhumba", in the eKasi+ sitcom Van 'n Sit. Other than that, he made guest roles in the soapies and comedies such as Jacob's Cross, Zabalaza, A Place Called Home, Generations, Abo Mzala, and Ses'Top La. In 2016, he appeared in the SABC2 telenovela Keeping Score with the role "Smokes". Later in the year, he made his final television appearance with the role "Edison" in the season two of SABC1 comedy serial Thandeka's Diary. Several days before his death, he auditioned for a role on Mzansi Magic drama series Ring of Lies.

Aside from acting, Kubheka performed with a group called Team Four. The group included Innocent "Bobo" Masuku and Dumisani "Stix" Khumalo. He also announced about his intentions to release an album under Kalawa Jazmee.

== Personal life ==
Kubheka married Cynthia Khumalo in 2010.

He died on 12 June 2017 at the age of 48 after committing suicide by hanging in his home at Soshanguve, Pretoria. His funeral service was postponed due to a "massive" backlog in the Gauteng provincial forensic services. In his suicide note, he explained the reason behind his suicide as his wife's secret relationship. His family found the circumstances of his death to be suspicious, as Kubheka was preparing to leave Khumalo before his death. During his memorial service, it was revealed Kubheka fathered 24 children.

== Filmography ==
Year	Film	Role	Genre	Ref.
1991	Crazy Safari	Xabo	Film	
1999	Yizo Yizo	Gunman	TV series	
2001	The Long Run	Johannes	Film	
2005	Zone 14	Bazooka Khumba	TV series	
2006	A Place Called Home	Guest role	TV series	
2007	Jacob's Cross	Assassin 1	TV series	
2013	Generations	Guest role	TV series	
2013	Zabalaza	Phathu	TV series	
2014	Vat 'n Sit	Skhumba	TV series	
2014	Ses'Top La	Guest role	TV series	
2015	Abo Mzala	Crazy	TV series	
2015	Gold Diggers	Scar	TV series	
2016	Keeping Score	Smokes	TV series	
2016	Thandeka's Diary	Edison	TV series	
