= Barry Weiss =

American music executive (born 1959)

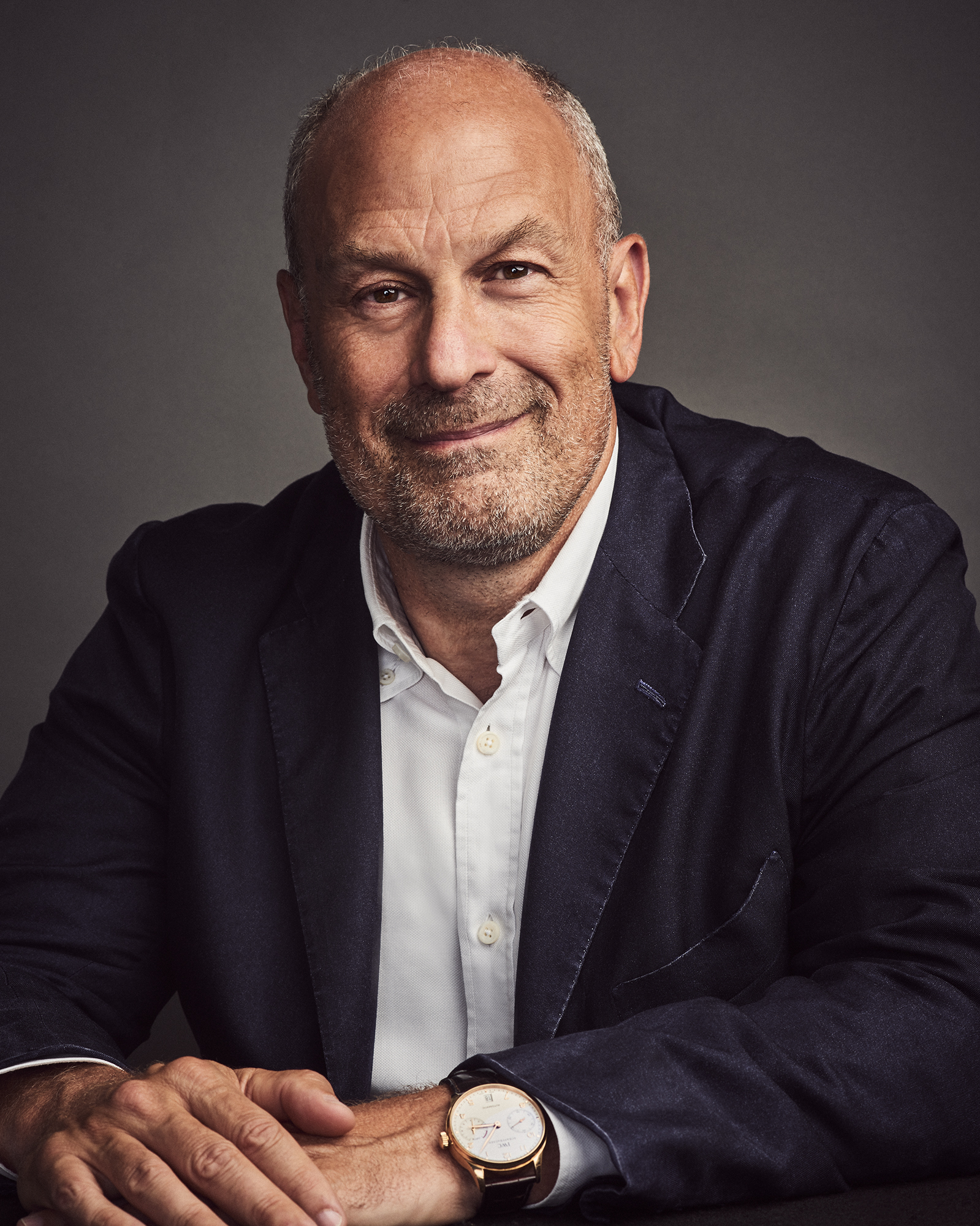
- Weiss in August 2016
- Born: February 11, 1959 (age 67); New York City, U.S.
- Education: Cornell University (BS); New York University (MBA)
- Occupations: Record executive; media proprietor
- Years active: 1981–present
- Labels: RECORDS; East Coast Labels; RCA/Jive Label Group; Jive

Barry Weiss (born February 11, 1959) is an American music executive. He co-founded the record label RECORDS in 2015, an imprint of Sony Music Entertainment that specializes in young recording artists.

Weiss got his start at Clive Calder's Jive Records before working his way up to the head of the RCA/Jive Label Group. While at Jive, Weiss fostered artists like Britney Spears, Justin Timberlake, NSYNC, Chris Brown, Backstreet Boys, A Tribe Called Quest, among others. He left the company in 2011 to join Universal Music Group, prior to co-founding RECORDS in 2015. The label has since signed artists including Nelly, 24kGoldn, Noah Cyrus, B-Lovee, Lennon Stella, LSD, Matt Stell, and Dax. In 2023, the labels other co-founders (Matt Pincus and Ron Perry) were ousted in a stake buyout, leaving Weiss as the company's sole proprietor. Weiss has also co-founded the publishing firm SONGS.

== Early life and education ==
Weiss was born to a Jewish family in New York City, on February 11, 1959, to parents Hy and Rosalyn Weiss. His father, Hy, was also a music executive having founded Old Town Records in the late 1950s. Barry Weiss graduated from Cornell University in 1981. While in school, he worked as a promoter to radio stations from his dorm room. Weiss received his Master of Business Administration from New York University in 1986.

== Career ==
=== 1981–2008: Early years, Jive, and Zomba ===
Early on in his career, Weiss worked at Ariola America and Infinity Records. He earned his first major job in 1982 at Clive Calder's new label, Jive Records. For his job interview, Weiss took Calder to various black, hip hop, and gay clubs where he knew bouncers and doormen throughout New York City. He initially started in the position of Manager of Artist Development. At the time of his arrival, the label consisted mostly of pop acts like Billy Ocean, A Flock of Seagulls, and Samantha Fox. Weiss helped establish the label as a home for rappers and hip hop artists like DJ Jazzy Jeff & The Fresh Prince, A Tribe Called Quest, Whodini, Kool Moe Dee, Too Short, Boogie Down Productions, UGK, and others.

In January 1995, Weiss was promoted to President of Jive Records along with Verity and Silvertone. From 1995 to 2000, Weiss was involved with acts such as Britney Spears, NSYNC, The Backstreet Boys, and others. He also oversaw the release of NSYNC's 2000 album, No Strings Attached which broke the album sales record (a record that stood until 2015). In 2002, Jive Records' parent company, Zomba Music Group, was purchased by BMG for $2.7 billion. Under BMG, Weiss was named the president and CEO of the newly formed Zomba Label Group. While in that position, he oversaw the careers of artists like Chris Brown, T-Pain, R. Kelly, and others.

=== 2008–2014: RCA/Jive to Universal ===
In 2008, Weiss was named chairman and CEO of the BMG Label Group (later renamed RCA/Jive Label Group), replacing Clive Davis. As the head of the label group, Weiss oversaw Jive, Verity, GospoCentric, Volcano, RCA, Arista, Fo Yo Soul, LaFace, and J. He also inherited the management of acts such as Pink, Whitney Houston, Alicia Keys, Daughtry, the Foo Fighters, Kelly Clarkson, Leona Lewis, and numerous others. In 2010, Weiss announced that he would be leaving the RCA/Jive Label Group for a position at the Universal Music Group. His official appointment to the position of chairman and CEO of a group of labels colloquially referred to as Universal's "East Coast" labels (i.e. Republic Records, Island Def Jam, Motown Records, etc.) came in March 2011.

Artists under Weiss's purview included Kanye West, Justin Bieber, Rihanna, 2 Chainz, Fall Out Boy, The Weeknd, Avicii, and numerous others. He left his position in 2014 after Universal decided to reorganize the music group into standalone labels.

=== 2015–present: Founder of RECORDS ===
In a partnership with SONGS Music Publishing, Weiss co-founded a new independent label, RECORDS, in early 2015. The SONGS roster included The Weeknd, Diplo, Lorde, and DJ Mustard (among others) at the time of RECORDS' founding. Early RECORDS' signees included Nelly and iLoveMemphis. Both artists had 2015 singles ("The Fix" and "Hit the Quan," respectively) that were certified platinum. Other RECORDS artists include Noah Cyrus, LSD (composed of Labrinth, Sia and Diplo), Lennon Stella, Lauren Jauregui, Dylan Brady, St. Paul and The Broken Bones, and James Barker Band, among others.

SONGS Music Publishing was sold to the Kobalt Music Group in December 2017. The following month, RECORDS became a joint venture with the Sony Music Entertainment.

| Preceded by L.A. Reid (Island Def Jam); Mel Lewinter (Universal Motown Republic) | Chief Executive Officer of Island Def Jam/Universal Republic; March 2011-April 2014 | Succeeded by Position terminated |

| Preceded by Clive Davis (RCA Music Group) | Chief Executive Officer of RCA/Jive Label Group; April 2008-March 2011 | Succeeded by Peter Edge (RCA Music Group) |
