= Yizo Yizo =

South African television teen drama series

- Genre: Teen drama
- Directed by: Teboho Mahlatsi; Angus Gibson
- Country of origin: South Africa
- No. of seasons: 3
- No. of episodes: 39

Production
- Producer: Desiree Markgraaff
- Production locations: Daveyton, South Africa
- Running time: 30 mins (series 1); 48 mins (series 2 & 3)
- Production companies: Laduma Film Factory (series 1); Bomb Productions (series 2 & 3)

Original release
- Network: SABC 1
- Release: 27 January 1999 – 1 July 2004

Yizo Yizo is a South African television teen drama series which aired from 27 January 1999 to 1 July 2004 on SABC 1.

== Synopsis ==
The series was set in a fictional school, Supatsela High, in a township of Johannesburg.

In the first series, the school's dictatorial principal, Mr. Mthembu, is forced to leave after beating a pupil. His successor, Ken Mokoena, is weak and corrupt and allows the school to be taken over by gangs, until he is replaced by Grace Letsatsi, who works with the school community to rebuild the school and expel the criminal elements.

== Cast ==
- Meshack Mavuso – Jabulani "Javas" Nyembe
- Tshepo Ngwane – Thabo Nonyane (Thiza)
- Charmaine Mtinta – Nomsa (series 1)
- Nomonde Gongxeka – Hazel (series 1)
- Noluthando Maleka – Dudu (series 1)
- Lorraine Mphephi – Mantwa
- Dumisane Khumalo – Sticks
- Christopher Kubheka – Gunman
- Ernest Msibi – Chester Serote
- Ronnie Nyakale – Ben "Papa Action" Mokoena (series 1)
- Bonginkosi Dlamini – Papa Action (series 2)
- Mbali Ntuli - Kekeletso Ralentswe
- Sthandiwe Kgoroge – Zoe Cele

== Production ==
Yizo Yizo was commissioned by the South African Department of Education to address problems in township schools as part of a campaign called Culture of Learning, Teaching and Service (COLTS). The series aimed to provide positive role models and depict the process of restoring a typical urban school in a South African township. The Department worked with the education division of the South African Broadcasting Corporation to develop storylines, then commissioned Laduma Film Factory (later renamed Bomb Productions) to produce the series.

The series was filmed in the township of Daveyton.

== See also ==
- Yizo Yizo (soundtrack)
