= RCA/Jive Label Group =

Short-lived American record label group

- Parent company: Sony Music Entertainment
- Founded: January 2009; 17 years ago
- Defunct: July 2011; 15 years ago
- Status: Defunct
- Distributor: Sony Music Entertainment
- Genre: Various
- Country of origin: United States
- Location: New York, NY
- Official website: http://www.sonymusic.com

RCA/Jive Label Group (sometimes stylized as RCA/JIVE Label Group) was an American record label group, owned by Sony Music Entertainment and representing the merger of the RCA Music Group and JIVE Label Group. The umbrella group was formed in 2007 under the name BMG Label Group, was rebranded as RCA/Jive Label Group in 2009. In July 2011, it was finally dissolved into two separate labels: the RCA Music Group and Epic Records which took Jive subsidiaries (LaFace, Battery, etc.) until October 2011 when it retired Jive Records along with Arista Records and J Records. The artists on those three labels were moved to RCA Records.

== History ==
=== Formation as BMG ===
RCA/Jive configuration began as the BMG Label Group during the last year of the Sony BMG merger. The group was officially formed in September 2007 when Bertelsmann Music Group restructured their RCA and Zomba groups into one entity bearing the BMG branding. Bob Anderson and Kevin Twitchell led the sales department for the new group, and John Fleckenstein was named senior VP of international. By early 2008, the BMG Label Group was said to consist of RCA Records, Jive Records, J Records, LaFace, Arista, Volcano Entertainment, Verity, GospoCentric and Fo Yo Soul. In April 2008, Jive head Barry Weiss was promoted to chairman and CEO of the whole BMG Label Group, a position he still held since the groups rebranding. Weiss replaced longtime music exec Clive Davis, who became the Chief Creative Officer. Though some interpreted this move by Sony as a way of shuffling Davis out of the company, he quickly reasserted his position as a hitmaker for Sony working with artists such as Leona Lewis and Jennifer Hudson.

=== Rebranding to RCA/Jive Label Group ===
In August 2008, BMG sold their half of the Sony BMG merger back to Sony. Since Bertelsmann retained the use of the "BMG" name, Sony renamed the BMG Label Group to RCA/Jive Label Group in early 2009, while at the same time, the Zomba Label Group officially began the process of rebranding to Jive Label Group. During 2009, branding for both Zomba Label Group and Jive Label Group linked to the same website while RCA/Jive seemed to eschew the Zomba name, suggesting that the branding was in process during this time. By early 2010, the Zomba site was completely reworked as the rebranding process was completed. Following the restructuring, Barry Weiss remained head of both RCA/Jive Label Group, and its constituent Jive Label Group. Weiss left the RCA/Jive Label Group in March 2011.

=== Dissolution ===
In mid-2011, Sony Music split RCA/Jive Label Group. Staff and artists associated with Jive were moved to a restructured Epic Records which is aimed to focus on (mostly) urban music. RCA Music Group remained on its own, and even took on some of the non-urban artist from Jive, such as notable pop superstar Britney Spears. L.A. Reid became chairman and CEO of Epic Records and Peter Edge became chairman and CEO of RCA Music Group.

== Structure ==
Though the RCA/Jive Label Group was often mentioned in press releases, and the entity often appeared as a copyright and phonograph rights holder on actual releases (this changed recently as of 2010, with each individual label being credited as itself on phonograph rights), it had a less public presence and no known website. Instead, both the RCA Music Group and the Jive Label Group operate as standalone units, but shared back-office functions and reported to CEO Barry Weiss. RCA/Jive consisted of several flagship record labels, which originally formed part of BMG before being absorbed into Sony's operations.

=== RCA Music Group ===
RCA Music Group
- Parent company: Sony Music Entertainment
- Founded: March 2004
- Distributor: RCA/Jive Label Group
- Genre: Various
- Country of origin: United States
- Location: New York, NY
- Official website: Official website

RCA Music Group was created by BMG in March 2004 shortly after the formation of Zomba Label Group. It became a part of the BMG Label Group along with Zomba, and remained unscathed after the rebranding. The group continued its operations following the dissolution of its parent group in 2011. During the existence of the RCA/Jive Label Group, the RCA Music Group consisted of the following labels:

- Arista Records
- J Records
- Phonogenic Records
- RCA Records
- The Inc Records

=== Jive Label Group ===
Jive Label Group
- Parent company: Sony Music Entertainment
- Founded: 2004; 22 years ago
- Genre: Various
- Country of origin: United States
- Location: New York, NY
- Official website: Official website

Jive Label Group is a music group which formed half of the RCA/Jive Label Group, a division of Sony Music Entertainment. Jive Label Group was founded in 2004 as Zomba Label Group by BMG, their parent company at the time. In January 2009. BMG sold their half of the Sony BMG merger to Sony and Zomba Label Group was rebranded to the current Jive Label Group.

During the existence of the RCA/Jive Label Group, the Jive Label Group consisted of the following labels:

- Battery Records
- Jive Records
- LaFace Records
- So So Def Recordings
- Verity Gospel Music Group
  - GospoCentric Records
  - Verity Records
  - Fo Yo Soul
  - Quiet Water Entertainment
- Volcano Entertainment

From 2004 until 2009, Jive Label Group was known as Zomba Label Group.

==== History ====
In late 2002, Zomba completed a US$2.74 billion transaction that required BMG to purchase the remaining shares of the Zomba Group of Companies. When BMG began their integration of Zomba labels into their operations, they created the Zomba Label Group in early 2004. Initially the group consisted of LaFace, Volcano, Silvertone and Jive, though later expanded to include other labels. In 2005, Zomba Label Group created a gospel division called Zomba Gospel to collate their gospel interests at the time. The group primarily consisted of GospoCentric Records and Verity Records, but also included some artist-owned imprints. After being shuffled under Sony in late 2008, the Zomba Label Group began rebranding to the Jive Label Group. Additionally, Zomba Gospel was rebranded as the Verity Gospel Music Group. In mid-2011, Jive Label Group was separated from the RCA Music Group and joined Epic Records under the newly formed Epic Label Group. Because of the stylistic focus of the new group (largely urban music), some of Jive's non-urban artists, such as Britney Spears, stayed with RCA Records.

== Artists ==
List of RCA Records artists

== Discography ==
The record labels under RCA/Jive have been releasing material since before the entity's existence. For detailed discographies of those labels, please visit their respective pages. For a list of releases which contain RCA/Jive as the copyright holder, see: RCA/Jive Label Group discography.

== Personnel ==
Name	Position	Tenure
Anderson, Bob	Head of sales	September 2007–July 2011
Davis, Clive	CEO	September 2007-April 2008
Fleckenstein, John	Senior VP, International	September 2007–July 2011
Thea, Peter	Executive Vice President	April 1999–July 2011
Twitchell, Kevin	Head of sales	September 2007–July 2011
Weiss, Barry	CEO/Chairman	April 2008–March 2011

== See also ==
- List of record labels
- Epic Records
- RCA Music Group
- Sony Music Entertainment
- Sony BMG
- Bertelsmann Music Group
