= Ralph Simon =

South African businessman

Ralph Simon is a South African business executive, who worked in the music industry, then in the mobile entertainment industry.

== Early life ==
He was raised in Johannesburg, South Africa where he went to the University of the Witwatersrand, and left South Africa in 1975 and settled in London. In 1990 he relocated to San Francisco, California and then in 1993 relocated to Los Angeles where he lived for over a decade.

== Career ==
Simon co-founded the independent Zomba Group of music companies (now a subsidiary of Sony Music Entertainment) with Clive Calder in the 1970s growing it over two decades to become the leading independent record label, music publishing company and producer management company of its era. Zomba's record label, Jive Records signed the American musical artists the Backstreet Boys, NSYNC, Britney Spears and Janet Jackson. In the mid-1990s, he was executive vice president of Capitol Records and Blue Note Records in Hollywood and started EMI Music's global New Media division. He started Yourmobile (later renamed Moviso), the first ring tone company in the Americas, Europe, UK, Australia and Africa, in 1997. In 2001, Simon co-founded YourMobile Group with Anthony Stonefield, Hilton Rosenthal Shane Dewing and Cliff Brigden.

Simon is the founder and chief executive of Mobilium Global Ltd (based in London, England, Los Angeles, Mumbai, with associate offices in Helsinki, Finland. In 2013, he was appointed Global Ambassador for the CTIA – The Wireless Association. CTIA is the Washington, DC–based wireless trade association driving wireless device certification, policy and all aspects of the wireless and mobile industry innovation and development. He has also been a regular speaker and moderator in the United States and Canada, officiating since 2008 at the annual Canadian Music Week conferences and also the Milken Global Conference in Los Angeles, Musexpo in Los Angeles and Start Up in New Orleans. He is on the board of Hungama Digital Media Entertainment.
