= CCP Records =

South African record label (e. 1972)

CCP Record
- Parent company: Universal Music Group (2013–present); EMI (1972–2013)
- Founded: 1972; 54 years ago
- Founder: Clive Calder; Ralph Simon
- Distributor: Universal Music Enterprises
- Genre: Various
- Country of origin: South Africa
- Location: Sandton, Johannesburg
- Official website: ccpworld.co.za

CCP Records (originally an acronym for Clive Calder Production) is a South African music entertainment company founded by Clive Calder and Ralph Simon. It is a production company. They envisioned the company while working for EMI South Africa in 1972. CCP Records was distributed by EMI Records South Africa. EMI purchased the company in that same year (the company is a wholly owned subsidiary of Universal Music Group since 2013 after buying most of EMI).

The company is the home to artists, musicians and recording producers such as Brenda Fassie, Sello Chicco Twala, Mara Louw, Pappa And Blonde, Steve Kekana, Camagwini, Mandoza, Mzekezeke, Dj Bongz, Brenda and the Big Dudes and Ringo Madlingozi.

== History ==
Calder joined EMI and became its manager of Artists and Repertoire In 1971, He signed groups such as Freedom's Children and the Otis Waygood Blues Band. In 1971, Calder and Simon began their two-decade partnership, forming businesses in record production and promotion, music publishing, artist management and concert promotion. Early companies formed by Calder and Simon were Sagittarius Management and Clive Calder Productions (CCP).

EMI Records South Africa acquired CCP Records as a wholly owned subsidiary in 1971. The company was purchased by EMI Records in 1972 (it still exists as a wholly owned subsidiary of EMI's successor Universal Music Group). In 1976, Calder and Ralph Simon moved to London, UK, and set up Zomba Group.

With EMI's sale to erstwhile corporate rival Universal Music Group (UMG) in 2012 only after fulfilling conditions from the European Commission like the divestment of EMI's certain European assets to other third-party companies, CCP Records distribution was moved to UMG in South Africa.

== Notable artists ==
Act	Year signed	# Albums released under CCP Records
Brenda Fassie (deceased)	1983–2004	17
Sello Chicco Twala	2006–present	0
Pappa And Blonde	1979–1982	1
Mara Louw	1989–1990	0
Arthur Mafokate	1997–1998	2
Aba Shante	1997–1999	2
Steve Kekana	1982–1983	1
Mandoza (deceased)	2000–2016	5
Brenda and the Big Dudes	1983–1987	6
Camagwini	2009–2013	2
Ringo Madlingosi	1997–present	3
L'Vovo Derrango	2008–present	1
DJ Bongz	2006–2008	3
Colbert Mukwevho	1995-2001	3

== See also ==
- EMI Records
