= Sello Chicco Twala =

South African musician (born 1963)

- Also known as: Chicco Thwala
- Born: Sello Twala; 5 June 1963 (age 63); Soweto, Johannesburg, South Africa
- Genres: Afropop
- Occupations: Singer and record producer

Sello "Chicco" Twala (born 5 June 1963) is a South African singer and record producer. He has produced many hit singles for well-known artists in the country, including Nkosana Kodi and Brenda Fassie. In the 1970s, Twala played in soul bands including Umoja and Sipho "Hotstix" Mabuse's Harari, as well as forming his own band, Image.

== Early life ==
Twala was born in Soweto, Johannesburg, where he attended Bopasenatla Secondary School.

== Career ==
Twala rose to prominence in the 1980s, writing a string of hit singles such as "We Miss You Manelo" (1987), which was certified triple-platinum by RISA, as well as Brenda Fassie's "Too Late for Mama" (1989), which was certified platinum. The title of the former is a reference to Nelson Mandela, who was imprisoned on Robben Island at the time.

In 1992, Twala recorded a soul ballad entitled "Peace Song", shortly before the nation's first democratic elections in 1994. He also collaborated with poet Mzwakhe Mbuli on "Papa Stop The War" (1990). Twala also wrote songs for and produced the album Memeza (1997) as part of a comeback by Brenda Fassie. Some of Twala's songs feature in Lion King II.

Through his music studio in Soweto, he works to help develop young musical artists' careers. He has won various awards, such as a Lifetime Achievement South African Music Award and a Metro FM Music Award.

Twala's song "Modjadji" was featured on the official soundtrack of the 2016 film Grimsby.

== Personal life ==
Sello Twala is the son of Elias Twala and Betty Khombo Masitha. He was married to Thembi, and they had three children.
