= The Masked Singer South Africa season 1 =

The Masked Singer South Africa
- Season 1
- Starring: J Something; Somizi Mhlongo; Sithelo Shozi; Skhumba Hlophe
- Hosted by: Mpho Popps
- No. of contestants: 16
- Winner: Holly Rey as "Lollipop"
- Runner-up: Kurt Darren as "Rhino"
- No. of episodes: 13

Release
- Original network: SABC 3
- Original release: 3 June – 26 August 2023

Season chronology
- Next → Season 2

The first season of the The Masked Singer South Africa premiered on SABC 3 on 3 June 2023, and concluded on 26 August 2023. The season was won by musician Holly Rey as "Lollipop", with singer-songwriter Kurt Darren finishing second as "Rhino", television presenter Maps Maponyane placing third as "Tree", and actor Abdul Khoza placing fourth as "Lion".

== Panelists and host ==
The announced host of the inaugural show was Mpho Popps. This coincided with the announcement of the following celebrities: actor and television personality Somizi Mhlongo, musician and chef J Something, socialite and media personality Sithelo Shozi, and actor and comedian Skhumba Hlophe were announced as the inaugural panel for the show, shared alongside with some guest appearances.

=== Guest panelists ===
Episode	Name	Notability
5	Boity Thulo	Musician
6	Tbo Touch	DJ
9	Moshe Ndiki	Television personality

== Production ==
The first season is produced by Rose and Oaks Media for Primedia Studios under the leadership of executive producers Anele Mgudlwa. It is sponsored by Andolex, King Pie and Mentos. The show airs on Saturdays at 19:00 on SABC 2. Repeats are shown on SABC 1 and SABC 2 throughout the week, with episodes also dropping for streaming on Netflix. The season 1 of The Masked Singer South Africa premiered on 3 June 2023. The competition features 16 celebrities battling in extravagant, brand new costumes for the coveted Golden Mask Trophy.

== Contestants ==
Stage name	Celebrity	Occupation(s)	Episodes												
Stage name	Celebrity	Occupation(s)	1	2	3	4	5	6	7	8	9	10	11	12	13
Lollipop	Holly Rey	Musician			WIN			WIN		SAFE	SAFE		RISK	SAFE	WINNER
Rhino	Kurt Darren	Singer/songwriter			RISK		WIN		SAFE			SAFE	WIN	SAFE	RUNNER-UP
Tree	Maps Maponyane	TV Personality	WIN				WIN		SAFE			SAFE	WIN	SAFE	THIRD
Lion	Abdul Khoza	Actor				WIN		RISK		SAFE	SAFE		RISK	SAFE	FOURTH
Fox	Zikhona Sodlaka	Actress				WIN		WIN		SAFE	SAFE		WIN	OUT	
Elephant	Jason Goliath	Actor	RISK				RISK		SAFE			SAFE	OUT		
Doughnut	Shekinah	Singer/songwriter			WIN			WIN		SAFE		OUT			
Sunflower	Makhadzi	Musician		WIN			RISK		SAFE		OUT				
Robot	Zozibini Tunzi	Model				RISK		RISK		OUT					
Watermelon	Devi Sankaree Govender	Journalist		RISK			WIN		OUT						
Warrior	Mmusi Maimane	Politician	WIN					OUT							
Hippo	David Kau	Actor		WIN			OUT								
Banana	Bongani Bingwa	TV Personality				OUT									
Soccerball	Doctor Khumalo	Former Soccer Player			OUT										
Rooster	Victor Matfield	Rugby Player		OUT											
Zebra	Lazy Makoti	Chef	OUT												

The masked singer won their face-off and remained in the competition.
The masked singer was safe from elimination.
The masked singer was in the bottom two, but was not eliminated.
The masked singer was eliminated from the competition and unmasked upon their elimination.
The masked singer did not perform.
The masked singer won the competition.
The masked singer finished second.
The masked singer finished third.
The masked singer finished fourth.

== Episodes ==
=== Week 1 (3 June) ===
Performances on the first episode
#	Stage name	Song	Identity	Result
1	Tree	"Mamela" by Mi Casa	undisclosed	WIN
2	Elephant	"Lovely Day" by Bill Withers	undisclosed	RISK
3	Zebra	"Ngiyazifela" by Lira	Lazy Makoti	OUT
4	Warrior	"Mthande" by Musa	undisclosed	WIN

=== Week 2 (10 June) ===
Performances on the second episode
#	Stage name	Song	Identity	Result
1	Hippo	"Kona" by Mafikizolo	undisclosed	WIN
2	Rooster	"Numb" by Marshmello & Khalid	Victor Matfield	OUT
3	Watermelon	"We Don't Talk Anymore" by Charlie Puth feat. Selena Gomez	undisclosed	RISK
4	Sunflower	"Akanamali" by Sun-El Musician feat. Samthing Soweto	undisclosed	WIN

=== Week 3 (17 June) ===
Performances on the third episode
#	Stage name	Song	Identity	Result
1	Soccerball	"Burn Out" by Sipho Mabuse	Doctor Khumalo	OUT
2	Doughnut	"Happy" by Pharrell Williams	undisclosed	WIN
3	Rhino	"I Gotta Feeling" by Black Eyed Peas	undisclosed	RISK
4	Lollipop	"Roar" by Katy Perry	undisclosed	WIN

=== Week 4 (24 June) ===
Performances on the fourth episode
#	Stage name	Song	Identity	Result
1	Banana	"So Amazing" by Luther Vandross	Bongani Bingwa	OUT
2	Lion	"Fairytale" by Liquideep	undisclosed	WIN
3	Fox	"Respect" by Aretha Franklin	undisclosed	WIN
4	Robot	"American Boy" by Estelle feat. Kanye West	undisclosed	RISK

=== Week 5 (1 July) ===
Performances on the fifth episode
#	Stage name	Song	Identity	Result
1	Watermelon	"Feel Good" by Lira	undisclosed	WIN
2	Sunflower	"Ibhanoyi" by Blaq Diamond	undisclosed	RISK
3	Tree	"Home" by Michael Bublé	undisclosed	WIN
4	Hippo	"September" by Earth, Wind & Fire	David Kau	OUT
5	Elephant	"Shape of You" by Ed Sheeran	undisclosed	RISK
6	Rhino	"Dance with My Father" by Luther Vandross	undisclosed	WIN

=== Week 6 (8 July) ===
Performances on the sixth episode
#	Stage name	Song	Identity	Result
1	Doughnut	"Pluto (Remember You)" by DJ Clock feat. Beatenberg	undisclosed	WIN
2	Lion	"I Swear" by All-4-One	undisclosed	RISK
3	Lollipop	"No Scrubs" by TLC	undisclosed	WIN
4	Robot	"Nizalwa Ngobani" by Thandiswa Mazwai	undisclosed	RISK
5	Fox	"Emini" by Kelly Khumalo	undisclosed	WIN
6	Warrior	"Easy" by Commodores	Mmusi Maimane	OUT

=== Week 7 (15 July) ===
Performances on the seventh episode
#	Stage name	Song	Identity	Result
1	Watermelon	"Dancing Queen" by ABBA	Devi Sankaree Govender	OUT
2	Sunflower	"Asibe Happy" by Ami Faku feat. DJ Maphorisa & Kabza de Small	undisclosed	SAFE
3	Tree	"Hell Naw" by Nasty C	undisclosed	SAFE
4	Elephant	"Location" by Khalid	undisclosed	SAFE
5	Rhino	"Can't Stop the Feeling!" by Justin Timberlake	undisclosed	SAFE

=== Week 8 (22 July) ===
Performances on the eighth episode
#	Stage name	Song	Identity	Result
1	Robot	"I Wanna Dance with Somebody (Who Loves Me)" by Whitney Houston	Zozibini Tunzi	OUT
2	Doughnut	"Lengoma" by DJ Sbu feat. Zahara	undisclosed	SAFE
3	Lollipop	"Fast Car" by Tracy Chapman	undisclosed	SAFE
4	Lion	"IMali" by Karyendasoul & Zakes Bantwini feat. Nana Atta	undisclosed	SAFE
5	Fox	"Killing Me Softly" by Fugees	undisclosed	SAFE

=== Week 9 (29 July) ===
Performances on the ninth episode
#	Stage name	Song	Identity	Result
1	Sunflower	"Destiny" by Malaika	Makhadzi	OUT
2	Fox	"I Will Always Love You" by Whitney Houston	undisclosed	SAFE
3	Lion	"Can We Talk" by Tevin Campbell	undisclosed	SAFE
4	Lollipop	"Vuli Ndlela" by Brenda Fassie	undisclosed	SAFE

=== Week 10 (5 August) ===
Performances on the tenth episode
#	Stage name	Song	Identity	Result
1	Tree	"When I Was Your Man" by Bruno Mars	undisclosed	SAFE
2	Rhino	"Jerusalema" by Master KG feat. Nomcebo	undisclosed	SAFE
3	Elephant	"Moves like Jagger" by Maroon 5 feat. Christina Aguilera	undisclosed	SAFE
4	Doughnut	"Pon de Replay" by Rihanna	Shekhinah	OUT

=== Week 11 (12 August) ===
Performances on the eleventh episode
#	Stage name	Song	Identity	Result
1	Elephant	"The World is Yours" by AKA	Jason Goliath	OUT
2	Tree	"Frontin'" by Pharrell Williams feat. Jay-Z	undisclosed	WIN
3	Lollipop	"Never Too Much" by Luther Vandross	undisclosed	RISK
4	Fox	"Banomoya" by Prince Kaybee	undisclosed	WIN
5	Lion	"Koze Kuse" by DJ Merlon feat. Mondli Ngcobo	undisclosed	RISK
6	Rhino	"Diamonds" by Rihanna	undisclosed	WIN

=== Week 12 (19 August) Semi-Final ===
Performances on the twelfth episode
#	Stage name	Song	Identity	Result
1	Lollipop	"If I Were a Boy" by Beyoncé	undisclosed	SAFE
2	Rhino	"All of Me" by John Legend	undisclosed	SAFE
3	Tree	"Abo Mvelo" by Daliwonga feat. Mellow & Sleazy	undisclosed	SAFE
4	Fox	"Phakade Lami" by Nomfundo Moh feat. Sha Sha & Ami Faku	Zikhona Sodlaka	OUT
5	Lion	"U Mama" by Sjava	undisclosed	SAFE

=== Week 13 (26 August) Finale ===
- Guest Mask: Mpho Popps as "Pangolin"

Performances on the thirteenth episode
#	Stage name	Song	Identity	Result
1	Rhino	"No Air" by Jordin Sparks feat. Chris Brown	undisclosed	WIN
2	Tree	"Knock You Down" by Keri Hilson feat. Ne-Yo & Kanye West	Maps Maponyane	THIRD
3	Lollipop	"Treasure" by Bruno Mars	undisclosed	WIN
4	Lion	"U Can't Touch This" by MC Hammer	Abdul Khoza	FOURTH
Sing-Off
1	Rhino	"Baby" by Justin Bieber feat. Ludacris	Kurt Darren	RUNNER-UP
2	Lollipop	"Baby" by Justin Bieber feat. Ludacris	Holly Rey	WINNER
