= The Masked Singer South Africa =

South African reality singing competition television series

- Genre: Reality competition
- Presented by: Mpho Popps
- Starring: J Something; Somizi Mhlongo; Sithelo Shozi; Skhumba Hlophe
- Country of origin: South Africa
- Original language: English
- No. of seasons: 3
- No. of episodes: 39

Original release
- Network: SABC 3; SABC 2
- Release: 3 June 2023 – present

The Masked Singer South Africa is a South African reality singing competition television series that premiered on SABC 3 on 3 June 2023. It is part of the Masked Singer franchise and hosted by Mpho Popps. The format features celebrities singing in head-to-toe costumes and face masks which conceal their identities from other contestants, panelists and an audience. The second season premiered on 6 April 2024. The third season premiered on 4 July 2026 airing on SABC 2.

== Format ==
Each season of The Masked Singer South Africa features a group of celebrity contestants. In a typical episode, four contestants anonymously in costume each sing for panelists and an audience. Hints to their identities, known as the "clue package" are given before and occasionally after each performs. The perennial format is a taped interview with a celebrity's electronically masked voice narrating a video showing cryptic allusions to what they are known for. During screenings of the clue packages, after performances and before an elimination, the panelists are given time to speculate on each singer's identity out loud and write comments in note binders. They may ask questions and the host may offer additional clues.

After performances conclude, the audience and panelists vote for their favorite singer using an electronic device. The show uses a weighted voting system; panelists' and audience members' votes are worth 50 percent each and combined to form a score. The least popular contestant then takes off their mask to reveal their identity. This process of elimination continues for a set number of episodes until four contestants remain in the season finale and one is declared the winner after they perform again. The "Golden Mask" trophy is awarded as a prize. Voting does not occur for certain performances; contestants in an episode might occasionally sing as a group, and each episode concludes with the eliminated celebrity singing an encore unmasked. Occasionally, the eliminated celebrity sings their signature song unmasked. To continue attracting viewers, producers often modify the format each season.

== Panelists and host ==
The permanent panel consists of television personality and actor Somizi Mhlongo, musician and former celebrity chef J Something, socialite and media personality Sithelo Shozi, and comedian Skhumba Hlophe. Mpho Popps hosts the show from season 1–present.

=== Guest panelists ===
Season	Episode	Name	Notability
1	5	Boity Thulo	Musician
1	6	Tbo Touch	Radio personality
1	9	Moshe Ndiki	TV personality
2	3	Jason Goliath	Actor
2	6	Kurt Darren	Singer
2	8	Devi Sankaree Govender	Journalist
2	9	Moshe Ndiki	TV personality
2	10	Holly Rey	Musician
3	4	Jason Goliath	Comedian
3	5	Moshe Ndiki	TV personality
3	9	Jason Goliath	Comedian
3	11	Moshe Ndiki	TV personality
3	11	Tbo Touch	Radio personality
3	11	Zee Nxumalo	Singer

== Series overview ==
Series overview
Series	Contestants	Episodes	Originally released		Winner	Runner-up	Third place	Fourth place
Series	Contestants	Episodes	First released	Last released	Winner	Runner-up	Third place	Fourth place
1	16	13	3 June 2023	26 August 2023	Holly Rey as "Lollipop"	Kurt Darren as "Rhino"	Maps Maponyane as "Tree"	Abdul Khoza as "Lion"
2	16	13	6 April 2024	29 June 2024	Warren Masemola as "Giraffe"	Shudufhadzo Musida as "Blue Crane"	Aubrey Poo as "Owl"	SbuNoah as "Gold"
3	16	13	4 July 2026	26 September 2026	Bontle Modiselle as "Spotty"	Robot Boii as "Mosquito"	Judith Sephuma as "Gogga"	Khanyi Mbau as "Chopsticks"

== Awards and nominations ==
Year	Association	Category	Nominated works	Result	Ref.
2023	National Film and Television Awards	Best Competition Show	The Masked Singer South Africa	Nominated	
2024	IAB Bookmark Awards	Bronze Award for digital promotion	The Masked Singer South Africa	Won	
2024	South African Film and Television Awards	Best International Format Reality Show (Season 1)	The Masked Singer South Africa	Won	
2024	South African Film and Television Awards	Most Popular TV Presenter	Mpho Popps	Nominated	
