= The Masked Singer South Africa season 2 =

The Masked Singer South Africa
- Season 2
- Starring: J Something; Somizi Mhlongo; Sithelo Shozi; Skhumba Hlophe
- Hosted by: Mpho Popps
- No. of contestants: 16
- Winner: Warren Masemola as "Giraffe"
- Runner-up: Shudufhadzo Musida as "Blue Crane"
- No. of episodes: 13

Release
- Original network: SABC 3
- Original release: 6 April – 29 June 2024

Season chronology
- ← Previous; Season 1 Next → Season 3

The second season of The Masked Singer South Africa premiered on SABC 3 on 6 April 2024, and concluded on 29 June 2024. The season was won by actor Warren Masemola as "Giraffe", with former Miss South Africa 2020 and actress Shudufhadzo Musida finishing second as "Blue Crane", actor Aubrey Poo placing third as "Owl", and singer and songwriter SbuNoah placing fourth as "Gold".

== Panelists and host ==
Mpho Popps returned as host, while Somizi Mhlongo, J Something, Sithelo Shozi, Skhumba Hlophe returned as panelists, shared alongside with some guest appearances.

=== Guest panelists ===
Episode	Name	Notability
3	Jason Goliath	Actor
6	Kurt Darren	Singer/songwriter
8	Devi Sankaree Govender	Journalist
9	Moshe Ndiki	TV Personality
10	Holly Rey	Musician

== Production ==
The second season is produced by Rose and Oaks Media for Primedia Studios under the leadership of executive producers Anele Mgudlwa. It is sponsored by Andolex, King Pie and Mentos. The show airs on Saturdays at 19:00 on SABC 2. Repeats are shown on SABC 1 and SABC 2 throughout the week, with episodes also dropping for streaming on Netflix. The season 2 of The Masked Singer South Africa premiered on 6 April 2024. The competition features 16 celebrities battling in extravagant, brand new costumes for the coveted Golden Mask Trophy.

== Contestants ==
Stage name	Celebrity	Occupation(s)	Episodes												
Stage name	Celebrity	Occupation(s)	1	2	3	4	5	6	7	8	9	10	11	12	13
Giraffe	Warren Masemola	Actor		WIN			WIN		SAFE			WIN	WIN	SAFE	WINNER
Blue Crane	Shudufhadzo Musida	Model			RISK			WIN		SAFE	WIN		WIN	RISK	RUNNER-UP
Owl	Aubrey Poo	Actor				WIN		RISK		RISK		WIN	WIN	SAFE	THIRD
Gold	SbuNoah	Singer/songwriter			WIN			WIN		SAFE	RISK		RISK	RISK	FOURTH
Boombox	Jimmy Nevis	Musician				RISK		WIN		RISK		RISK	RISK	OUT	
Butterfly	Boity Thulo	Musician	RISK				RISK		RISK		WIN		OUT		
Diamond	Dineo Ranaka	Radio Personality		RISK			WIN		SAFE			OUT			
Mielie	Bobby van Jaarsveld	Singer/songwriter		WIN			WIN		RISK		OUT				
Ice Cream	Jessica Nkosi	Actress			WIN			RISK		OUT					
Rainbow	Andile Dlamini	Singer	WIN				RISK		OUT						
Monster	Breyton Paulse	Former Rugby Player				WIN		OUT							
Wildebeest	Dricus du Plessis	MMA Fighter	WIN				OUT								
Star	LaConco	TV Personality				OUT									
Cheetah	Khutso Theledi	Radio Broadcaster			OUT										
Tortoise	Celeste Ntuli	Comedian		OUT											
Springbok	Nthati Moshesh	Actress	OUT												

The masked singer won their face-off and remained in the competition.
The masked singer was safe from elimination.
The masked singer was in the bottom two, but was not eliminated.
The masked singer was eliminated from the competition and unmasked upon their elimination.
The masked singer did not perform.
The masked singer won the competition.
The masked singer finished second.
The masked singer finished third.
The masked singer finished fourth.

== Episodes ==
=== Week 1 (6 April) ===
Performances on the first episode
#	Stage name	Song	Identity	Result
1	Rainbow	"Sorry" by Justin Bieber	undisclosed	WIN
2	Butterfly	"Paint the Town Red" by Doja Cat	undisclosed	RISK
3	Wildebeest	"Let Me Entertain You" by Robbie Williams	undisclosed	WIN
4	Springbok	"As It Was" by Harry Styles	Nthati Moshesh	OUT

=== Week 2 (13 April) ===
Performances on the second episode
#	Stage name	Song	Identity	Result
1	Tortoise	"Free" by Lebo Mathosa	Celeste Ntuli	OUT
2	Giraffe	"Ngud'" by Kwesta feat. Cassper Nyovest	undisclosed	WIN
3	Diamond	"Umbrella" by Rihanna feat. Jay-Z	undisclosed	RISK
4	Mielie	"Trumpets" by Jason Derulo	undisclosed	WIN

=== Week 3 (20 April) ===
Performances on the third episode
#	Stage name	Song	Identity	Result
1	Ice Cream	"Milkshake" by Kelis	undisclosed	WIN
2	Blue Crane	"Viva la Vida" by Coldplay	undisclosed	RISK
3	Gold	"Beautiful Girls" by Sean Kingston	undisclosed	WIN
4	Cheetah	"What's My Name?" by Rihanna feat. Drake	Khutso Theledi	OUT

=== Week 4 (27 April) ===
Performances on the fourth episode
#	Stage name	Song	Identity	Result
1	Boombox	"Tonight (Best You Ever Had)" by John Legend feat. Ludacris	undisclosed	RISK
2	Owl	"Izolo" by DJ Maphorisa & Tyler ICU	undisclosed	WIN
3	Star	"Ngilimele" by MaWhoo feat. Deep Sen, KingTalkzin & Mthunzi	LaConco	OUT
4	Monster	"Gimme Hope Jo'anna" by Eddy Grant	undisclosed	WIN

=== Week 5 (4 May) ===
Performances on the fifth episode
#	Stage name	Song	Identity	Result
1	Butterfly	"How Will I Know" by Whitney Houston	undisclosed	RISK
2	Mielie	"Perfect" by Ed Sheeran	undisclosed	WIN
3	Wildebeest	"Counting Stars" by OneRepublic	Dricus du Plessis	OUT
4	Diamond	"Bad Guy" by Billie Eilish	undisclosed	WIN
5	Rainbow	"ROCK3T" by Mi Casa	undisclosed	RISK
6	Giraffe	"You'll Never Find Another Love Like Mine" by Lou Rawls	undisclosed	WIN

=== Week 6 (11 May) ===
Performances on the sixth episode
#	Stage name	Song	Identity	Result
1	Ice Cream	"Flowers" by Miley Cyrus	undisclosed	RISK
2	Blue Crane	"Adorn" by Miguel	undisclosed	WIN
3	Monster	"Take On Me" by A-ha	Breyton Paulse	OUT
4	Gold	"When a Man Loves a Woman" by Michael Bolton	undisclosed	WIN
5	Owl	"Kiss from a Rose" by Seal	undisclosed	RISK
6	Boombox	"Hold On, We're Going Home" by Drake feat. Majid Jordan	undisclosed	WIN

=== Week 7 (18 May) ===
Performances on the seventh episode
#	Stage name	Song	Identity	Result
1	Rainbow	"So Sick" by Ne-Yo	Andile Dlamini	OUT
2	Diamond	"Ndikuthandile" by Vusi Nova	undisclosed	SAFE
3	Giraffe	"Umbayimbayi" by Inkabi Zezwe	undisclosed	SAFE
4	Butterfly	"Break My Heart" by Dua Lipa	undisclosed	RISK
5	Mielie	"Sweet Caroline" by Neil Diamond	undisclosed	RISK

=== Week 8 (25 May) ===
Performances on the eighth episode
#	Stage name	Song	Identity	Result
1	Owl	"Break My Soul" by Beyoncé	undisclosed	RISK
2	Ice Cream	"Forever" by DJ Sithelo feat. Skye Wanda	Jessica Nkosi	OUT
3	Gold	"U Remind Me" by Usher	undisclosed	SAFE
4	Boombox	"Lovin on Me" by Jack Harlow	undisclosed	RISK
5	Blue Crane	"Over the Rainbow" by Judy Garland	undisclosed	SAFE

=== Week 9 (1 June) ===
Performances on the ninth episode
#	Stage name	Song	Identity	Result
1	Butterfly	"Suited" by Shekhinah	undisclosed	WIN
2	Mielie	"We Are Young" by Fun feat. Janelle Monáe	Bobby van Jaarsveld	OUT
3	Gold	"Young Forever" by Jay-Z	undisclosed	RISK
4	Blue Crane	"Nomvula" by Nathi	undisclosed	WIN

=== Week 10 (8 June) ===
Performances on the tenth episode
#	Stage name	Song	Identity	Result
1	Giraffe	"Shibobo" by TKZee feat. Benni McCarthy	undisclosed	WIN
2	Diamond	"Weekend Special" by Brenda and the Big Dudes	Dineo Ranaka	OUT
3	Boombox	"Paradise Road" by Joy	undisclosed	RISK
4	Owl	"Shebeleza (OKongo Mame)" by Joe Mafela	undisclosed	WIN

=== Week 11 (15 June) ===
Performances on the eleventh episode
#	Stage name	Song	Identity	Result
1	Gold	"Sgudi Snyc" by Da Muziqal Chef feat. De Mthuda & Eemoh	undisclosed	RISK
2	Giraffe	"Tiya Mfana (Mzokwana)" by DJ Tshegu & Focalistic	undisclosed	WIN
3	Boombox	"eMcimbini" by Kabza de Small & DJ Maphorisa	undisclosed	RISK
4	Owl	"iPlan" by Dlala Thukzin feat. Zaba & Sykes	undisclosed	WIN
5	Butterfly	"Funk 55" by Shakes & Les feat. Zee Nxumalo & DBN Gogo	Boity Thulo	OUT
6	Blue Crane	"Mnike" by Tyler ICU & Tumelo_za	undisclosed	WIN

=== Week 12 (22 June) Semi-Final ===
Performances on the twelfth episode
#	Stage name	Song	Identity	Result
1	Boombox	"Truth or Dare" by Tyla	Jimmy Nevis	OUT
2	Gold	"Lose Control" by Teddy Swims	undisclosed	RISK
3	Giraffe	"Thunder" by Imagine Dragons	undisclosed	SAFE
4	Blue Crane	"Can't Take My Eyes Off You" by Lauryn Hill	undisclosed	RISK
5	Owl	"I Beat" by Joyous Celebration	undisclosed	SAFE

=== Week 13 (29 June) Finale ===
- Guest Performance: "Peaches" by Justin Bieber performed by Maps Maponyane as " Puppy"

Performances on the thirteenth episode
#	Stage name	Song	Identity	Result
1	Blue Crane	"We Found Love" by Rihanna feat. Calvin Harris	undisclosed	WIN
2	Gold	"We Found Love" by Rihanna feat. Calvin Harris	SbuNoah	FOURTH
3	Giraffe	"As Long as You Love Me" by Backstreet Boys	undisclosed	WIN
4	Owl	"As Long as You Love Me" by Backstreet Boys	Aubrey Poo	THIRD
Sing-Off
1	Blue Crane	"In Common" by Alicia Keys	Shudufhadzo Musida	RUNNER-UP
2	Giraffe	"Welcome to Jamrock " by Damian Marley	Warren Masemola	WINNER
