= Nelson Mandela (EP) =

EP by Zahara
- Released: July 15, 2013
- Recorded: 2013
- Genre: Afro-soul
- Label: TS Records
- Producer: Robbie Malinga; Mojalefa Thebe

Zahara chronology
The Beginning Live (2012)	Nelson Mandela (2013)	Phendula (2013)

Nelson Mandela is the debut extended play by South African singer Zahara. It pays tribute to Nelson Mandela and was released on July 15, 2013, at a time when Mandela was critically ill at the Mediclinic Heart Hospital in Pretoria. The lead single, eponymously titled "Nelson Mandela", peaked at number 1 on South Africa's official music chart. Nelson Mandela was made available for purchase on iTunes upon its release.

== Lead single ==
Zahara released the Mzwakhe Mbuli-assisted song "Nelson Mandela", which pays tribute to Nelson Mandela and celebrates his accomplishments. Zahara told City Press newspaper she was excited to release the song and experienced different emotions while releasing it. When the song was played on Metro FM, it created a lot of media and social buzz.

== Critical reception ==
City Press newspaper said the ballad "evokes strong emotions, spurred on by the relentless guitar accompaniment" and praised Zahara's "soaring, strong vocals".

== Live performances ==
Zahara performed the lead single for Mandela at the Medi-Clinic Heart Hospital in Pretoria.

== Track listing ==
No.	Title	Length
1.	"Nelson Mandela"	5:04
2.	"Nelson Mandela (Instrumental)"	5:04
3.	"1 Minute of "Nelson Mandela""	1:23
4.	"1 Minute of "Nelson Mandela" (Instrumental)"	1:23

== Charts ==
Chart (2013)	Peak position
South Africa (EMA)	1
