= The Beginning Live =

2012 DVD by Zahara

Video by Zahara
- Released: September 3, 2012
- Recorded: June 8–9, 2012; Carnival City, Ekurhuleni
- Genre: Afro-soul
- Length: 110 minutes
- Language: Xhosa, English
- Label: TS Records

Zahara chronology
| Loliwe (2011) | The Beginning Live (2012) | Nelson Mandela (2013) |

The Beginning Live (stylized as Zahara: The Beginning Live) is a live DVD by South African singer Zahara. It was released by TS Records on September 3, 2012, and features additional performances from LeRoy Bell, DJ Sbu, the Soweto Gospel Choir and Riot. The Beginning Live was filmed at Carnival City in Ekurhuleni on June 8 and 9. During her two-day performance, Zahara was backed by an eight person band led by percussionist Tlale Makhene.

The Beginning Live was distributed by Musica, Kalahari and SoMusi. It features performances of songs from Zahara's debut studio album, Loliwe (2011), along with her rendition of Brenda Fassie's "Vuli Ndlela". The Beginning Live received positive reviews from music critics, who praised Zahara's live performances of the songs. The DVD was commercially successful, selling over 40,000 copies and reaching double platinum status in South Africa. Moreover, it was one of the fastest selling DVDs released by a South African artist.

== Background and concert performances ==
Rehearsals for the two-day event were held at the Pyramid Venue & Conference Centre. As part of the DVD recording, Zahara and Leroy Bell performed some of their biggest songs. In an interview with The Sowetan, Leroy Bell said he felt in love with Zahara's music after googling her and was honored to be part of the DVD production. In the same interview, Zahara said she was nervous about the prospect of working with Bell. She also said she loves Bell's voice and found it coincidental that both of them have a song on their respective albums called "Brand New Day". Zahara paid tribute to Brenda Fassie and Miriam Makeba during her two-day performance.

Commenting on the success of the concert and DVD recording, Zahara stated: "I feel that God has favoured me, this is just a blessing. It shows that if you remain true to who you are people will support you and remain faithful to you."

== Reception ==
=== Critical reception ===
Drum magazine praised Zahara, saying she "pulls at the heart strings with her passionate and honest rendition" and commended her for being a "consummate entertainer who knows her way with a live audience and takes them along for a ride in her musical train."

=== Accolades ===
The Beginning Live was nominated for Best Live DVD at the 19th annual South African Music Awards.

== Track listing ==
DVD
| No. | Title | Length |
|---|---|---|
| 1. | "Liza Lisidinga Lakho" (featuring Soweto Gospel Choir) | 6:12 |
| 2. | "Xa Bengina Mama (Live)" | 4:57 |
| 3. | "Destiny (Live)" | 5:44 |
| 4. | "Ndiza (Live)" | 5:34 |
| 5. | "Umthwalo" (featuring Soweto Gospel Choir) | 7:05 |
| 6. | "Thekwana (Live)" | 4:19 |
| 7. | "African Sunset (Live)" | 4:37 |
| 8. | "Promises (Live)" | 1:55 |
| 9. | "Vul’indlela (Live)" | 3:17 |
| 10. | "Thetha Nami" (featuring Riot Zungu) | 6:04 |
| 11. | "Hold on (Bambelela)" (featuring LeRoy Bell) | 6:57 |
| 12. | "My Guitar (Live)" | 8:46 |
| 13. | "Incwadi e Ncane (Live)" | 6:07 |
| 14. | "Loliwe" (featuring Soweto Gospel Choir) | 7:43 |

== Credits and personnel ==
- Zahara – primary artist
- LeRoy Bell – guest artist
- DJ Sbu – guest artist
- Soweto Gospel Choir – guest artist
- Riot – guest artist

== Release history ==
| Country | Date | Format | Label |
|---|---|---|---|
| South Africa | September 3, 2012 | CD/DVD, digital download | TS Records |
