= The Masked Singer South Africa season 3 =

The Masked Singer South Africa
- Season 3
- Starring: J Something; Somizi Mhlongo; Sithelo Shozi; Skhumba Hlophe
- Hosted by: Mpho Popps
- No. of contestants: 16
- Winner: Bontle Modiselle as "Spotty"
- Runner-up: Robot Boii as "Mosquito"
- No. of episodes: 13

Release
- Original network: SABC 2
- Original release: 4 July – 26 September 2026

Season chronology
- ← Previous; Season 2

The third season of the The Masked Singer South Africa premiered on SABC 2 on 4 July 2026, and concluded on 26 September 2026. The season was won by dancer Bontle Modiselle as "Spotty", with media personality Robot Boii finishing second as "Mosquito", musician Judith Sephuma placing third as "Gogga", and actress Khanyi Mbau placing fourth as "Chopsticks".

== Panelists and host ==
Host Mpho Popps, actor and television personality Somizi Mhlongo, musician and chef J Something, socialite and media personality Sithelo Shozi, actor and comedian Skhumba Hlophe all returned from the previous two seasons.

=== Guest panelists ===
Episode	Name	Notability	Ref
4	Jason Goliath	Comedian	
5	Moshe Ndiki	TV personality	
9	Jason Goliath	Comedian	
11	Moshe Ndiki	TV personality	
11	Tbo Touch	Radio personality	
12	Zee Nxumalo	Singer	

== Production ==
The third season is produced by Rose and Oaks Media for Primedia Studios under the leadership of executive producers Anele Mgudlwa. It is sponsored by Andolex, King Pie and Mentos. The show airs on Saturdays at 19:00 on SABC 2. Repeats are shown on SABC 1 and SABC 2 throughout the week, with episodes also dropping for streaming on Netflix. The season 3 of The Masked Singer South Africa premiered on 4 July 2026. The competition features 16 celebrities battling in extravagant, brand new costumes for the coveted Golden Mask.

== Contestants ==
Stage name	Celebrity	Occupation	Episodes												
Stage name	Celebrity	Occupation	1	2	3	4	5	6	7	8	9	10	11	12	13
Spotty	Bontle Modiselle	Dancer/actress		WIN			WIN			SAFE		RISK	WIN	SAFE	WINNER
Mosquito	Robot Boii	Media personality		WIN			WIN			SAFE		WIN	WIN	RISK	RUNNER-UP
Gogga	Judith Sephuma	Musician				WIN		WIN	SAFE		RISK		RISK	SAFE	THIRD
Chopsticks	Khanyi Mbau	Actress	WIN				RISK			RISK		WIN	RISK	RISK	FOURTH
The Sheep	Simphiwe Ngema	Actress				WIN		RISK	SAFE		WIN		WIN	OUT	
The Sheep	Tino Chinyani	TV personality				WIN		RISK	SAFE		WIN		WIN	OUT	
Pineapple	Brenden Praise	Singer			WIN			WIN	RISK		WIN		OUT		
Leopard	Tumisho Masha	Actor	RISK				RISK			RISK		OUT			
Sushi	Lasizwe	Media personality			WIN			WIN	RISK		OUT				
King Pie	Rikus de Beer	Comedian		RISK			WIN			OUT					
Spinach	Jack Parow	Rapper			RISK			RISK	OUT						
Koeksister	Tumi Morake	Actress/comedian				RISK		OUT							
Protea	Shannon Esra	Actress	WIN				OUT								
Pap & Wors	Popi Sibiya	Content creator				OUT									
Clock	Sidwell Ngwenya	Producer			OUT										
Lady Monster	Linda Mtoba	Actress		OUT											
Ponte Tower	Trevor Gumbi	Comedian/actor	OUT												

The masked singer was safe from elimination.
The masked singer won their face-off and remained in the competition.
The masked singer was in the bottom two, but was not eliminated.
The masked singer was eliminated from the competition and unmasked upon their elimination.
The masked singer did not perform.
The masked singer won the competition.
The masked singer finished second.
The masked singer finished third.
The masked singer finished fourth.

== Episodes ==
=== Week 1 (4 July) ===
Performances on the first episode
#	Stage name	Song	Identity	Result
1	Leopard	"Ordinary" by Alex Warren	undisclosed	RISK
2	Chopsticks	"Water" by Tyla	undisclosed	WIN
3	Protea	"Rolling in the Deep" by Adele	undisclosed	WIN
4	Ponte Tower	"Dlala Mapantsula" By TKZee	Trevor Gumbi	OUT

=== Week 2 (11 July) ===
Performances on the second episode
#	Stage name	Song	Identity	Result
1	Mosquito	"Without Me" by Eminem	undisclosed	WIN
2	Lady Monster	"Golden" from KPop Demon Hunters	Linda Mtoba	OUT
3	Spotty	"Where Is My Husband!" by Raye	undisclosed	WIN
4	King Pie	"Hotel California" by Eagles	undisclosed	RISK

=== Week 3 (18 July) ===
Performances on the third episode
#	Stage name	Song	Identity	Result
1	Sushi	"Hey Ya!" by Outkast	undisclosed	WIN
2	Clock	"I Like to Move It" by Erick Morillo & Sacha Baron Cohen	Sidwell Ngwenya	OUT
3	Spinach	"Boombastic" by Shaggy	undisclosed	RISK
4	Pineapple	"Beautiful Things" by Benson Boone	undisclosed	WIN

=== Week 4 (25 July) ===
Performances on the fourth episode
#	Stage name	Song	Identity	Result
1	Koeksister	"I'm Every Woman" by Chaka Khan	undisclosed	RISK
2	Gogga	"Leave the Door Open" by Silk Sonic	undisclosed	WIN
3	Pap & Wors	"Say My Name" by Destiny's Child	Popi Sibiya	OUT
4	The Sheep	"Dilemma" by Nelly feat. Kelly Rowland	undisclosed	WIN

=== Week 5 (1 August) ===
Performances on the fifth episode
#	Stage name	Song	Identity	Result
1	Leopard	"Mirrors" by Justin Timberlake	undisclosed	RISK
2	Mosquito	"Drop It Like It's Hot" by Snoop Dogg feat. Pharrell Williams	undisclosed	WIN
3	Chopsticks	"Havana" by Camila Cabello feat. Young Thug	undisclosed	RISK
4	Spotty	"Titanium" by David Guetta feat. Sia	undisclosed	WIN
5	Protea	"Ain't No Mountain High Enough" by Marvin Gaye & Tammi Terrell	Shannon Esra	OUT
6	King Pie	"Proud Mary" by Creedence Clearwater Revival	undisclosed	WIN

=== Week 6 (8 August) ===
Performances on the sixth episode
#	Stage name	Song	Identity	Result
1	Sushi	"Nkalakatha" by Mandoza	undisclosed	WIN
2	Koeksister	"Don't Stop the Music" by Rihanna	Tumi Morake	OUT
3	Spinach	"Dames" by Biggy	undisclosed	RISK
4	Gogga	"Collide" by Lady Zamar	undisclosed	WIN
5	Pineapple	"I Want It That Way" by Backstreet Boys	undisclosed	WIN
6	The Sheep	"No Air" by Jordin Sparks & Chris Brown	undisclosed	RISK

=== Week 7 (15 August) ===
- Guest Mask: Tbo Touch as "Detective Pangolin"

Performances on the seventh episode
#	Stage name	Song	Identity	Result
1	Sushi	"Hotline Bling" by Drake	undisclosed	RISK
2	Spinach	"Great Heart" by Johnny Clegg & Savuka	Jack Parow	OUT
3	Gogga	"Easy on Me" by Adele	undisclosed	SAFE
4	Pineapple	"Timber" by Pitbull feat. Kesha	undisclosed	RISK
5	The Sheep	"Empire State of Mind" by Jay-Z feat. Alicia Keys	undisclosed	SAFE

=== Week 8 (22 August) ===
Performances on the eighth episode
#	Stage name	Song	Identity	Result
1	Leopard	"7 Days" by Craig David	undisclosed	RISK
2	Chopsticks	"Brand New Day" by Lebo Mathosa	undisclosed	RISK
3	Mosquito	"Sister Bethina" by Mgarimbe	undisclosed	SAFE
4	Spotty	"It's About Time" by Boom Shaka	undisclosed	SAFE
5	King Pie	"Party in the U.S.A." by Miley Cyrus	Rikus de Beer	OUT

=== Week 9 (29 August) ===
Performances on the ninth episode
#	Stage name	Song	Identity	Result
1	Sushi	"Umngan'wami" by Babes Wodumo feat. Mampintsha	Lasizwe	OUT
2	Pineapple	"Bengicela" by GL_Ceejay, MaWhoo and Thukuthela feat. JAZZWRLD	undisclosed	WIN
3	Gogga	"One Last Time" by Ariana Grande	undisclosed	RISK
4	The Sheep	"SMA" by Nasty C feat. Rowlene	undisclosed	WIN

=== Week 10 (5 September) ===
Performances on the tenth episode
#	Stage name	Song	Identity	Result
1	Leopard	"A Good Night" by John Legend feat. BloodPop	Tumisho Masha	OUT
2	Chopsticks	"Partii" by Kamo Mphela, Aymos, Que DJ & Jay Music feat. SpacePose	undisclosed	WIN
3	Mosquito	"All I Do Is Win" by DJ Khaled feat. Ludacris, Snoop Dogg, T-Pain & Rick Ross	undisclosed	WIN
4	Spotty	"Always Be My Baby" by Mariah Carey	undisclosed	RISK

=== Week 11 (12 September) ===
Performances on the eleventh episode
#	Stage name	Song	Identity	Result
1	Chopsticks	"Dance Monkey" by Tones and I	undisclosed	RISK
2	Spotty	"Shela" by Sam Deep, Nia Pearl, Boohle and Mano	undisclosed	WIN
3	Mosquito	"Phants' Komthunzi Welanga" by Brown Dash	undisclosed	WIN
4	Gogga	"Don't Let Me Down" by The Chainsmokers feat. Daya	undisclosed	RISK
5	The Sheep	"Always on Time" by Ja Rule feat. Ashanti	undisclosed	WIN
6	Pineapple	"Residuals" by Chris Brown	Brenden Praise	OUT

=== Week 12 (19 September) ===
Performances on the twelfth episode
#	Stage name	Song	Identity	Result
1	Chopsticks	"Halo" by Beyoncé	undisclosed	RISK
2	Mosquito	"Thong Song" by Sisqó	undisclosed	RISK
3	Spotty	"Bang Bang" by Jessie J, Ariana Grande and Nicki Minaj	undisclosed	SAFE
4	The Sheep	"Beauty and a Beat" by Justin Bieber feat. Nicki Minaj	Simphiwe Ngema	OUT
4	The Sheep	"Beauty and a Beat" by Justin Bieber feat. Nicki Minaj	Tino Chinyani	OUT
5	Gogga	"Shake It Off" by Taylor Swift	undisclosed	SAFE

=== Week 13 (26 September) ===
Performances on the thirteenth episode
#	Stage name	Song	Identity	Result
1	Chopsticks	"APT." by Rosé and Bruno Mars	Khanyi Mbau	FOURTH
2	Mosquito	"APT." by Rosé and Bruno Mars	undisclosed	WIN
3	Spotty	"The Boy Is Mine" by Brandy and Monica	undisclosed	WIN
4	Gogga	"The Boy Is Mine" by Brandy and Monica	Judith Sephuma	THIRD
Sing-Off
1	Mosquito	"Drive" by Black Coffee and David Guetta feat. Delilah Montagu	Robot Boii	RUNNER-UP
2	Spotty	"Drive" by Black Coffee and David Guetta feat. Delilah Montagu	Bontle Modiselle	WINNER
