= Phendula (song) =

2013 single by Zahara

Single by Zahara

from the album Phendula
- Released: September 6, 2013
- Recorded: 2013
- Genre: Afro-soul
- Length: 4:29
- Label: TS Records
- Songwriter(s): Bulelwa Mkutukana

Zahara singles chronology
"Ndiza" (2011)	"Phendula" (2013)	"Impilo" (2013)

Music video
- "Phendula" on YouTube

"Phendula" (Xhosa: "Answer") is a song by South African singer Zahara. It was released on September 6, 2013, serving as the lead single from her second studio album of the same name. The song peaked at number six on South Africa's EMA Airplay chart on October 8, 2013.

== Background and live performances ==
In a nutshell, "Phendula" is a prayer to God asking for the eradication of human suffering and hardship. Zahara performed the song for the first time on Live AMP. She also performed the song at the Boardwalk Casino and Entertainment World on December 8, 2013.

== Music video ==
The music video for "Phendula" was filmed in South Africa by Thorn Bubble Films and uploaded to YouTube on September 27, 2013.

== Critical reception ==
"Phendula" received positive reviews from music critics. Furah Mahlangu and Buchule Raba of GoXtra News said the song "left many yearning, and impatient of the release day of the full album as the Twitter buzz hasn't stopped with fans begging for more".

=== Accolades ===
"Phendula" was nominated for Song of the Year at the 2014 Metro FM Music Awards.

== Charts ==
Chart (2013)	Peak position
South Africa (EMA)	6
