= Loliwe =

Studio album by Zahara
- Released: 6 September 2011
- Recorded: 2011
- Genre: Afro-soul
- Label: TS Records
- Producer: Robbie Malinga; Mojalefa Thebe

Zahara chronology
Loliwe (2011)	The Beginning Live (2012)

Singles from Loliwe
- 1. "Loliwe" Released: 31 August 2011; 2. "Ndiza" Released: 25 November 2011

Loliwe (English: The Train) is the debut studio album by South African singer Zahara, released on 6 September 2011. The album's production was handled by Robbie Malinga and Mojalefa Thebe. It was supported by two singles: "Loliwe" and "Ndiza", and features a guest appearance from Georgyn Kanana. It sold over 20,000 copies and reached gold status within 72 hours of its release. Four weeks after it was released, it sold 210,000 copies in South Africa. Furthermore, Loliwe sold 350,000 copies after four months of being on the market. It is the second fastest selling album in South African history behind Brenda Fassie's Memeza, which sold over 500,000 copies.

== Background ==
Zahara wrote most of the songs for the album prior to signing a record deal with TS Records in August 2010. In her songs, she references apartheid activists like Walter Sisulu, Nelson Mandela and Helen Joseph. The title track "Loliwe" refers to the train that brought workers back home after many years of working in Johannesburg, where they often had other families. In an interview, Zahara described the album as a "metaphor" and further said, "It's like ... just pick yourself up. No matter who's your father or who's your mother ... I believe that you're not a mistake."

== Singles ==
TS Records released the album's lead single "Loliwe" on 31 August 2011. Its accompanying music video was produced by Mastermax Films. "Ndiza" was released as the album's second single on 25 November 2011. Zahara describes the song as "a place one goes to make their heart pure". The music video for the song was also directed by Ash Dibben.

== Critical reception ==
Professional ratings
Review scores
Source	Rating
Music Review South Africa	92/100
MOMIX	8/10

Loliwe received widespread acclaim from music critics. Simah of MOMIX gave the album an 8 out of 10, stating, "The album actually proves the opinions I've been hearing about it. And it serves as one of the most powerful debuts by a South African woman. She certainly possesses the golden touch because her talent is enough to make her shine and reach for her destiny." Claire Martens of Music Review South Africa assigned a normalized score of 92 out of 100, adding, "Set against the strumming of her guitar and the infusion of African-style beats, the music tends towards simplicity and integrity. Having said that, the album is not perfect. I thought the song "My Guitar" was her weakest offering and inappropriately placed. I also felt like the first part of album is stronger than the rest, "Umthwalo" and "Loliwe" being the pinnacle, throwing the rest of the album off kilter. Bar this, Loliwe comes close to perfection."

=== Accolades ===
Loliwe won Best Selling Album, Album of the Year and Best Smooth Urban Music Album at the 18th Annual South African Music Awards. It was nominated for Best Produced Album and won Best Female Album at the 2011 Metro FM Music Awards.

Year	Awards ceremony	Award description(s)	Results
2012	18th Annual South African Music Awards	Best Smooth Urban Music Album	Won
2012	18th Annual South African Music Awards	Best Selling Album	Won
2012	18th Annual South African Music Awards	Album of the Year	Won
2011	Metro FM Music Awards	Best Produced Album	Nominated
2011	Metro FM Music Awards	Best Female Album	Won

== Track listing ==
All tracks are written by Bulelwa Mkutukana, Robbie Malinga and Mojalefa Thebe

No.	Title	Writer(s)	Length
1.	"Destiny"	Bulelwa Mkutukana	4:16
2.	"Umthwalo"	Bulelwa Mkutukana	5:33
3.	"Loliwe"	Bulelwa Mkutukana	4:32
4.	"Xa Bendingena Mama"	Bulelwa Mkutukana	3:19
5.	"Ndiza"	Bulelwa Mkutukana	3:23
6.	"Incwad' Encane" (featuring Georgyn Kanana)	Bulelwa Mkutukana and Georgyn Kanana	5:06
7.	"Lengoma"	Bulelwa Mkutukana	3:42
8.	"My Guitar"	Bulelwa Mkutukana	5:30
9.	"Thekwana"	Bulelwa Mkutukana	3:29
10.	"Away"	Bulelwa Mkutukana	4:19
11.	"Brand New Day"	Bulelwa Mkutukana	3:59
12.	"Shine"	Bulelwa Mkutukana	4:40

Bonus track
No.	Title	Writer(s)	Length
13.	"Lengoma (remix)"	Bulelwa Mkutukana	7:16

== Personnel ==
- Georgyn Kanana – Featured artist
- Robbie Malinga – Producer
- Mojalefa Thebe – Producer

== Release history ==
Region	Date	Format	Label
South Africa	6 September 2011	CD, Digital download	TS Records
