= Phendula =

Studio album by Zahara
- Released: September 13, 2013
- Recorded: 2012–13
- Studios: KZN Studios, Greyville, Durban
- Genre: Afro-soul
- Length: 60:05
- Label: TS Records
- Producers: Robbie Malinga; Mojalefa Thebe

Zahara chronology
Nelson Mandela (2013)	Phendula (2013)	Country Girl (2015)

Singles from Phendula
- 1. "Phendula" Released: September 6, 2013; 2. "Impilo" Released: November 1, 2013; 3. "Stay"

Phendula (Xhosa: "Answer") is the second studio album by South African singer Zahara. It was released by TS Records on September 13, 2013. The album's production was primarily handled by Robbie Malinga and Mojalefa Thebe. Phendula features guest appearances from Ladysmith Black Mambazo, Anele & Neliswa, Mzwakhe Mbuli, Mukengerwa Tresor Riziki, and 2face Idibia. It was supported by the singles "Phendula", "Impilo", and "Stay". Upon release, the album was made available for purchase on iTunes and Musica.

== Background ==
In an interview with The Herald's Yoliswa Sobuwa, Zahara said she was excited about the album and expects her fans to love it because of her vocal growth and songwriting skills. She also said the lead single and title track, "Phendula", is about seeking answers from God for the eradication of human suffering.

The album was recorded at KZN Studios in Greyville and mastered at TS Records studios in Joburg. Zahara told You magazine that she planned on shooting a live DVD for Phendula and will invite guest acts who appeared on the project to perform with her. TruFm reported that Phendula went platinum after being on the market for seven days. Moreover, it went double platinum and sold over 100,000 copies after two weeks.

== Singles ==
The title track, "Phendula", was released on September 6, 2013, as the album's lead single. Its music video was uploaded to YouTube on September 27, 2013.

"Impilo" was released on November 1, 2013, as the album's second single. The accompanying music video for the song features cameo appearances from TS Records dignitaries, and was uploaded to YouTube at a total length of 3 minutes and 48 seconds.

The album's third single, "Stay", features vocals by Nigerian singer 2face Idibia. In an interview with newspaper Sunday Sun, Zahara described the song as a melodic track about love. Zahara and 2face recorded the song after being in the studio for 5 hours.

== The Phendula tour ==
The Phendula tour
- Tour by Zahara
- Associated album: Phendula
- Start date: September 27, 2013
- End date: December 8, 2013
- No. of shows: 11

To celebrate the album's release, Zahara and her management team put together the Phendula Tour, which was sponsored by Nedbank and supported by Drum Magazine, Cape Argus, Vukani, and Metro FM.

Date	City	Country	Venue	Ref
Africa
September 27, 2013	Cape Town	South Africa	Cape Town ICC	
October 3, 2013	Gauteng	South Africa	Lyric Theatre at Gold Reef City	
October 4, 2013	Gauteng	South Africa	Lyric Theatre at Gold Reef City	
October 11, 2013	Polokwane	South Africa	Meropa Casino	
October 18, 2013	Pretoria	South Africa	Tshwane State Theatre	
November 1, 2013	East London	South Africa	Orient Theatre	
November 8, 2013	Durban	South Africa	Durban City Hall	
November 9, 2013	Newcastle	South Africa	Newcastle Show Hall	
November 22, 2013	Mahikeng	South Africa	Mmabatho Convention Centre	
November 29, 2013	Mangaung	South Africa	Bloemfontein Show Grounds	
December 8, 2013	Port Elizabeth	South Africa	Boardwalk Casino	

== Critical reception ==
Phendula received positive reviews from music critics. Swagger Magazine awarded the album a 91.8 rating out of 100, praising Zahara's musicianship and voice. The magazine also the album's songs for being "deeper and more thoughtful than typical pop".

=== Accolades ===
Phendula was nominated for Best African Pop Album at the 2014 Metro FM Music Awards. It won Best Selling Album and Best RnB, Soul and Reggae at the 20th Annual SAMAs.

== Track listing ==
No.	Title	Writer(s)	Length
1.	"Rise Again"	Bulelwa Mkutukana; Ladysmith Black Mambazo	4:07
2.	"Phendula"	Mkutukana	4:29
3.	"Impilo"	Mkutukana	5:20
4.	"Indlela Yam'"	Mkutukana	4:06
5.	"Bhekile"	Mkutukana	4:10
6.	"Okwami Ngokwakho"	Mkutukana	5:00
7.	"Umongameli"	Mkutukana	3:13
8.	"Iphupha"	Mkutukana	4:18
9.	"Bomi Endibaziyo" (featuring Anele & Neliswa)	Mkutukana	4:05
10.	"Limisa" (featuring Mukengerwa Tresor Riziki)	Mkutukana; Tresor Riziki	4:27
11.	"Mandela" (featuring Mzwakhe Mbuli)	Mkutukana	3:38
12.	"Brighter Day"	Mkutukana; Riziki	5:30
13.	"My Story"	Mkutukana	3:42
14.	"Stay" (featuring 2 Face Idibia)	Mkutukana; Innocent Ujah Idibia	3:53
Total length:			60:05

== Personnel ==
- Bulelwa Mkutukana – primary artist, writer
- Ladysmith Black Mambazo – featured artists, writers
- Anele & Neliswa – featured artist
- Mzwakhe Mbuli – featured artist
- Mukengerwa Tresor Riziki – featured artist
- Robbie Malinga – producer
- Mojalefa Thebe – producer

== Release history ==
Region	Date	Format	Label
South Africa	September 13, 2013	CD, Digital download	TS Records
