= Ruda Landman =

South African journalist, television presenter and author

Ruda Landman (née Wahl; born 18 November 1953) is a South African television presenter and investigative journalist. She is best known for her long tenure as co-anchor of Carte Blanche.

== Early life and education ==
Landman was born on 18 November 1953 in Hartswater, Northern Cape, South Africa. She grew up in Hartswater and Keimoes. She studied languages at the University of Stellenbosch.

== Career ==
=== Journalism and early media work ===
Landman began her career in journalism at the newspaper Die Burger. She later worked in radio and for magazines, including Sarie.

=== Carte Blanche ===
In August 1988, Landman became one of the original co-anchors of Carte Blanche, the South African investigative journalism and current affairs programme on M-Net. She co-hosted alongside Derek Watts. She remained with the programme until mid-2007, when she stepped down after nearly 19 years. In 2018, she returned as a guest presenter for the show's 30th anniversary.

=== Other media and writing ===
Landman has published books including Off Camera – The stories behind Carte Blanche (2003) and Weerskante van die lens. After leaving Carte Blanche, she continued to work as an author, presenter, journalism lecturer, and public speaker. She has hosted podcasts such as Change Matters with Ruda Landman and When Change Happens, co-hosted with Frank Magwegwe.

== Awards and recognition ==
In 2011, Stellenbosch University awarded Landman an honorary doctorate for her contribution to journalism.

== Personal life ==
Landman married political and economic analyst J. P. Landman in 1977. They have one son, Johannes. She lives in Johannesburg.

== Legacy ==
Landman is regarded as one of South Africa’s leading investigative journalists due to her long association with Carte Blanche.
