= Mgodi =

Studio album by Zahara
- Released: 13 October 2017
- Recorded: 2017
- Genre: Afro-soul
- Label: Warner Music South Africa, Music Lives Here Records
- Producer: Mojalefa "Mjakes" Thebe

Zahara chronology
| Country Girl (2015) | Mgodi (2017) | Nqaba Yam (2021) |

Singles from Mgodi
- 1. "Mgodi" Released: 13 December 2015; 2. "Ndiveze" Released: 3 December 2015

Mgodi (English: Excavation) is the fourth studio album by South African musician Zahara. It was released on October 13, 2017, through Warner Music. It features production from Mojalefa Thebe.

The album was a best-seller, attained gold certification in six hours and then achieving platinum status 20 hours after release by the Recording Industry of South Africa (RiSA).

At the 24th ceremony of South African Music Awards Mgodi was nominated for best Afro-pop Album category.

== Background ==
Mgodi was inspired by Zahara's experiences with the intense public scrutiny that South Africa's tabloid journalists have subjected her to during her career. The album was also influenced by her departure from her former label, TS Records, in December 2016.

Zahara recorded the album in Johannesburg with producer Mjalefa "Mjakes" Thebe. Her three sisters make an appearance on the album on the track "God in the Valley".

== Promotion ==
Zahara further promoted Mgodi with her Africa All Star Music Festival in August 2019, performing in the United States.

== Track listing ==
All tracks are written by Bulelwa Mkutukana, except where noted

| No. | Title | Writer(s) | Length |
|---|---|---|---|
| 1. | "Umsebenzi Wam" | | 3:41 |
| 2. | "Ndiveze" | | 3:53 |
| 3. | "Mgodi" | | 3:59 |
| 4. | "Umfazi" (featuring Kirk Whalum) | | 4:02 |
| 5. | "Ina Mvula" (featuring Kirk Whalum) | | 4:26 |
| 6. | "Thembalam" | | 4:24 |
| 7. | "Tribute" (featuring Sivuyile and Mluleki Ndwalane) | Rethabile Silindela, Mojalefa Thebe | 3:55 |
| 8. | "Yhini" | | 4:08 |
| 9. | "Ndivulele" | | 4:21 |
| 10. | "Win or Lose" | | 3:57 |
| 11. | "Love Is in the Air" | | 4:04 |
| 12. | "God in the Valley" (featuring the Mkutukana Sisters) | | 4:43 |

== Certifications and sales ==
| Region | Certification | Certified units/sales |
|---|---|---|
| South Africa (RISA) | Gold | 15,000^{*} |
^{*} Sales figures based on certification alone.
