= Mzwakhe Mbuli =

South African musician and poet

Mzwakhe Mbuli (born 1 August 1959) is a South African poet, Mbaqanga singer and former Deacon at Apostolic Faith Mission Church in Naledi Soweto, South Africa. Known as "The People's Poet, Tall Man, Mbulism, The Voice Of Reason", he is the father of Mzwakhe Mbuli Junior, also known as Robot Boii.

== Early life ==
He was born in Sophiatown, and shortly moved after his family was forced to move to Soweto when the government bulldozed his home town.

== Controversies ==
Mbuli dishourned concourt about the usage of woman's surname. Mbuli was convicted in March 1999 of armed robbery and possession of a hand grenade-–crimes he has consistently denied committing; he and his supporters have always insisted he was framed by the government for speaking out against corruption. He was held at the Leeuwkop Maximum Security Prison, until his release in November 2003.

== Career ==
His works include a book of poems, Before Dawn (1989), and albums Change Is Pain (1986), Unbroken Spirit (1989), Resistance Is Defence (1992), and Africa (1993). His poems are mainly in English but draw on his native Zulu as well as traditional praise poetry and rap. His best-known poem is "Change Is Pain," a protest piece about oppression and revolution, which was initially banned until growing pressure forced South Africa to allow more freedom of speech. His first performance group was called Khuvhangano.

Throughout the 1980s, Mbuli was repeatedly detained by the authorities and denied a passport to travel while playing a leading role in the cultural activities of the United Democratic Front. His international career began in 1990 in Berlin, Germany when he shared the stage with Youssou N'dour, Miriam Makeba and Thomas Mapfumo. An imposing figure, standing well over 6 feet (1.8 m) tall, he performed at the funeral of Chris Hani, the assassinated head of the South African Communist Party, and at the presidential inauguration Nelson Mandela in 1994. In 1996 Mbuli was invited to London to co-host, with British poet and activist Benjamin Zephaniah, the Two Nations Concert at the Albert Hall to honor President Nelson Mandela on his visit to London. Later in the year, he returned to the UK to join Peter Gabriel, Youssour N'dour and other prominent African artists to record the fundraising Aids Album.

In 1990, he was profiled in the documentary film Songololo: Voices of Change.

== Discography ==
=== Studio albums ===
- Change Is Pain (1986) Shifty (Rounder - USA)
- Unbroken Spirit (1988) Shifty Records
- Resistance Is Defence (1992) Stern's Earthworks
- Afrika (1993) CCP/EMI South Africa
- Izigi (1994) CCP/EMI, South Africa
- KwaZulu-Natal (1996) CCP / EMI South Africa
- Umzwakhe Ubongu Ujehovah (1997) CCP/EMI South Africa
- Mbulism (2004) CCP/EMI South Africa

=== Singles ===
- "Mandela" (with Zahara) (2013)
