= Nqaba Yam =

Studio album by Zahara
- Released: August 15, 2021
- Recorded: 2019–2021
- Genre: Afropop; country; gospel; Afro-soul
- Length: 51:16
- Label: Warner Music South Africa
- Producer: Zahara; Mojalefa "Mjakes" Thebe

Zahara chronology
Mgodi (2017)	Nqaba Yam (2021)

Singles from Nqaba yam
- 1. "Nyamezela" Released: May 07, 2021; 2. "Nqaba Yam" Released: July 30, 2021

Nqaba Yam is the fifth and final studio album by the South Africa singer Zahara, released on August 13, 2021, by Warner Music South Africa. The album is a follow-up to her fifth studio album, Mgodi (2017), the album explores themes such as love, faith, exploitation, media criticism, and social issues. Additionally, the album incorporates influences from afropop, country, Afro-soul, and gospel genres.

The album received favorable reviews from music critics. The album spawned one singles, lead single "Nyamezela", and "Nqaba yam", which peaked at number one on iTune chart.

== Background ==
In the wake of separating from TS Records, Zahara embarked on a new chapter in her music career, taking full control of her creative journey and financial dealings. Her departure marked a significant turning point as she set out to reclaim her narrative following her struggles with heavy alcohol consumption, which led to multiple rehab stints. With the new deal with Warner Music South Africa, As she embarked on her new chapter in her career, Zahara began channeling her energies into the creation of her upcoming album amidst her battle with alcoholism.

Following a four-year hiatus, Zahara announced her fifth studio album on CapeTalk site and later released the album's lead single "Nyamezela" on 7 May 2021. With the second single following on 30 July 2021 "Nqaba Yam". The album was conceived and recorded during the start of the COVID-19 pandemic. The album was initially set to be released on 9 July 2021, but was delayed due to COVID-19 lockdowns and finally released on 13 August 2021.

=== Promotion ===
To promote the album, Zahara appeared on the 7th EMY Africa Awards, performing the new single "Nqaba Yam".

== Track listing ==
All tracks are written by Bulelwa Mkutukana, with additional contributors noted.

No.	Title	Length
1.	"Nqaba Yam"	4:33
2.	"Sinda Mphefumlo"	4:15
3.	"Ndikhona"	4:11
4.	"Ndincede"	4:34
5.	"Bawo"	4:48
6.	"Systems"	4:09
7.	"Ntak’ encinane"	3:53
8.	"Senzeni"	4:47
9.	"Nyamezela"	5:30
10.	"Izolo"	4:18
11.	"Forever Yours"	3:37
12.	"Iphupho Lam"	3:36

== Credits and personnel ==
Credits adapted from allmusic

- Bulelwa Mkutukana - Primary Artist, Vocals, Composer, Lyricist
- Bheka Mthethwa - Guitar (Bass)
- Devine Mitchell - Guitar
- Goran Josipovic - Engineer
- Mjakes Thebe - Engineer, Mixing, Producer
- Mojalefa Thebe - Composer
- Ndumiso Khubisa - String Programming
- Peter Jemba - Drums
- Rogan Kelsey - Mastering
- Xolani Thabethe - Keyboards
