= Grace Matata =

Tanzanian singer

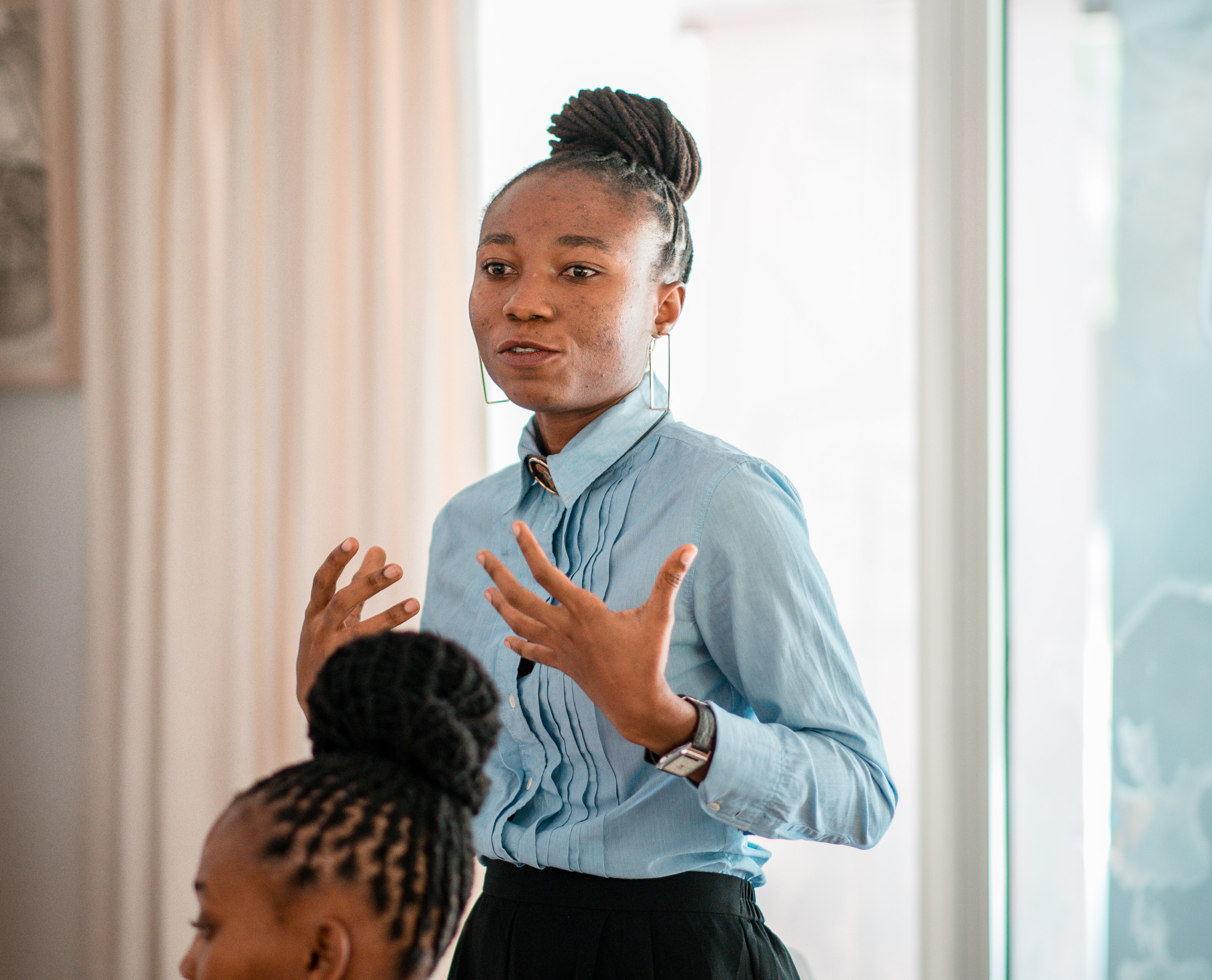
- Matata at the IWD2019

Background information
- Origin: Dar es Salaam, Tanzania
- Genres: Afro-soul; Bongo Flava; contemporary R&B
- Occupation: Singer-songwriter
- Years active: 2010–present
- Labels: Stargaze; Panamusiq (former); Media Kings (former)

Grace Matata is a Tanzanian afro-soul singer. She released her debut album Nyakati in 2013.

== Career ==
Matata writes and performs music that is 'a unique blend of Swahili soul, R&B, and jazz.' Her career began in 2010 when she signed with the record label Music Lab (M-Lab)/Media Kings and released the singles "WIMBO" and "Freesoul." The former song was nominated for a Teen Extra Award that year.

Matata released her first album, titled Nyakati (meaning 'times' in Swahili), in 2013 to critical acclaim. An active part of the Dar es Salaam and East African music scene, she released a series of singles between 2015 and 2019 and was nominated for a 2015 Kilimanjaro Music Award.

Following her success, Matata signed a deal with Tanzanian management company Panamusiq in 2017. In 2020, she began working with the Dar es Salaam-based a talent management and entertainment company Stargaze Management.

In 2020, she released her EP Rebirth.

Matata is an ambassador for UNICEF Tanzania; for World Children's Day in 2018, she released a song with the organization called "Baby."

== Discography ==
Adapted from Apple Music.

Albums

- Nyakati (2013)
- Rebirth EP (2020)

Singles

- "Tabibu" (2015)
- "Utanifaa" (2016)
- "Dakika Moja" feat. Wakazi (2017)
- "Baby" (2019)
