= Combined Artists Productions =

Combined Artistic Productions is a South African production company owned by Jon Sparkes, George Mazarakis, and Nomahlubi Simamane, a Black Economic Empowerment partner.

The company produces South Africa's longest-running television series, Carte Blanche, for M-Net. The series started in 1988. In January 2010 two spin-off series were launched, namely, Carte Blanche Consumer and Carte Blanche Medical. In 2011, a further spin-off, Carte Blanche Extra was launched, which departed from the magazine format for a more behind-the-scenes reality format.

On 8 September 2009 FIFA selected Combined Artistic Productions to produce the FIFA World Cup Final Draw in Cape Town, which was broadcast to an expected 200-million viewers. The company also produced the Preliminary Draw in Durban in November 2007 and the FIFA Confederations Cup draw in Johannesburg in November 2008.
