= Resistance Is Defence =

Studio album by Mzwakhe Mbuli
- Released: 1992
- Genre: Dub poetry
- Label: Earthworks/Virgin
- Producer: Trevor Herman

Mzwakhe Mbuli chronology
Unbroken Spirit (1988)	Resistance Is Defence (1992)	Afrika (1993)

Resistance Is Defence is an album by the South African musician Mzwakhe Mbuli. It was released in 1992. Some of its songs were banned from South African radio.

Mbuli supported the album, his first to be released internationally, with a global tour. Mbuli's touring band was dubbed the Equals.

== Production ==
The album was produced by Trevor Herman. Its songs are about South African apartheid, township life, and hope. The sound draws from kwela, township jive, and mbaqanga. "Chris the Doyen", which Mbuli performed at the funeral of Chris Hani, appears on some editions of Resistance Is Defence.

== Critical reception ==
Professional ratings
Review scores
Source	Rating
AllMusic	4.5/5 stars
Robert Christgau	A
The Indianapolis Star	3/4 stars
Los Angeles Daily News	3/4 stars
MusicHound World: The Essential Album Guide	4/5 stars

Robert Christgau noted that Mbuli "didn't start out as a musician—like Linton Kwesi Johnson, he's just a poet who loves music enough to do it right." Spin included the album on its list of "10 Best Albums You Didn't Hear in '92", writing that "in a world of post-apartheid township jive, Mbuli stands tall ... as both an influence and an inspiration." The Los Angeles Daily News deemed it "some of the most uplifting dance music on the planet."

The Indianapolis Star determined that "it's Mbuli's defiant optimism that rings over the pop township jive by varying his message through questions, rational dialogue and sarcasm." The St. Louis Post-Dispatch wrote: "Wedded to the infectious grooves provided by the musicians, and served with a stunningly tasty set of catchy hooks, Mbuli's lyrics find him dancing on the grave of oppression, even if he's not quite convinced the corpse is in it yet." The Washington Post stated: "The album's most powerful song, 'Tshipfinga', delivers this reminder in English to South Africa's younger generation of blacks: 'When you vote and get elected, think of those who died. When you govern the country, think of those who died'."

AllMusic wrote that Mbuli "recites his work against a background of driving South African rhythms including kwela, mbaqanga, and sax jive."

== Track listing ==
No.	Title	Length
1.	"Uyeyeni"
2.	"Tshipfinga (Chipinga)"
3.	"Pitoli"
4.	"Stalwarts"
5.	"Land Deal"
6.	"Lusaka"
7.	"Emandulo"
8.	"Ndimbeleni"
9.	"Joyina"
10.	"Malambalamba"
