= Vinzzent =

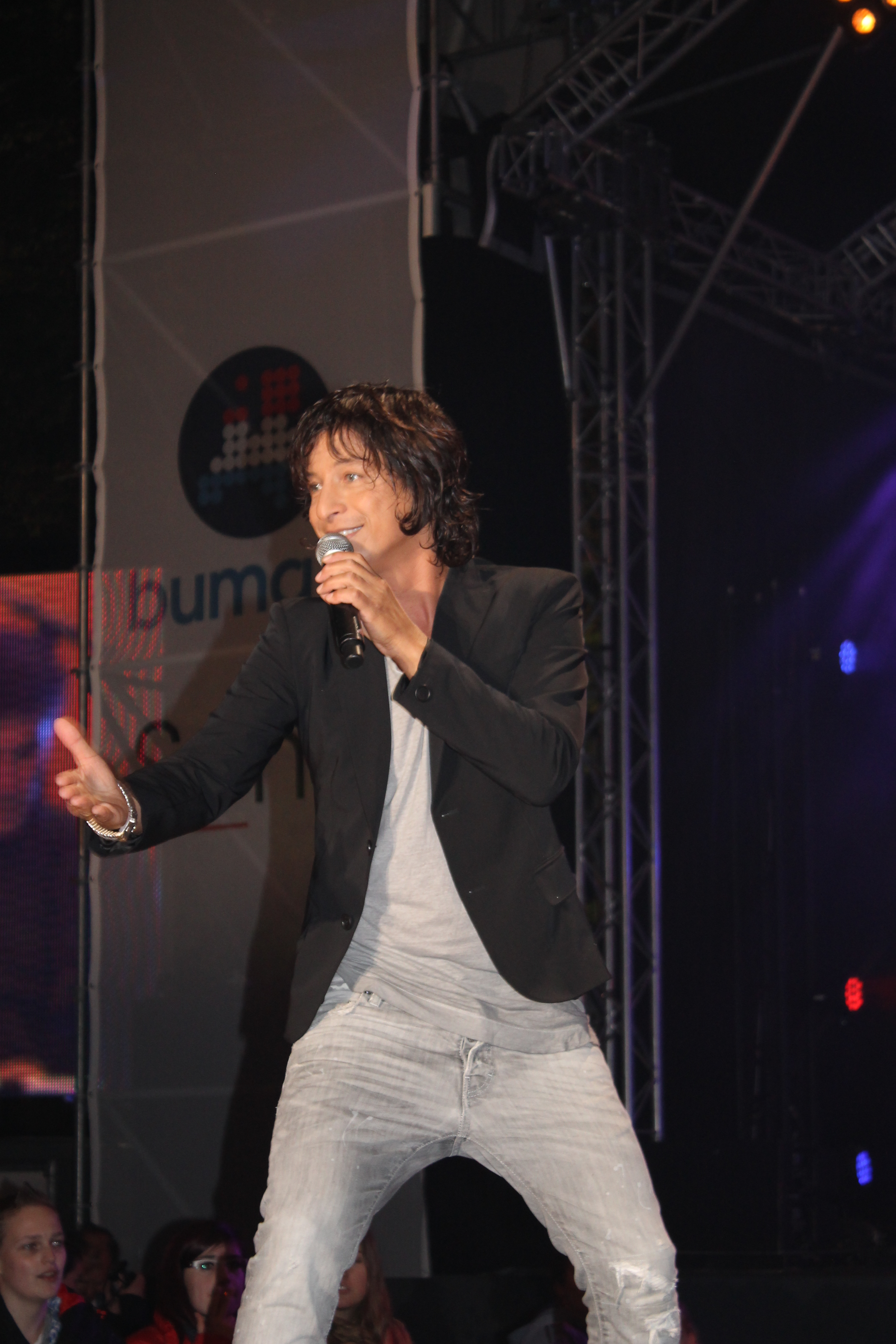

Background information
- Also known as: Vinzzent
- Born: Vincent Johannes Rudolf Claase; 20 July 1978 (age 47); Winterswijk
- Origin: Netherlands
- Genres: Levenslied; Pop; Rock
- Occupations: Singer-songwriter, studio technician
- Years active: 2007–present
- Label: N8M
- Website: vinzzent.nl

Vincent Johannes Rudolf Claase, better known by his stage name Vinzzent, is a Dutch singer-songwriter.

== Biography ==
Vinzzent was born in Winterswijk to a Dutch mother and an Indonesian father. He spent his early life growing up in Enschede and The Hague before settling down in Oosterhout. Vinzzent's father organized many events with pop and rock bands, exposing him to these genres early in life.

Vinzzent trained as a studio technician and began working with several Dutch artists. One of these artists, Rob de Nijs, gave Vinzzent his singing debut during his jubileum concert at the Royal Theatre Carré.

Vinzzent has one son, Vince Claase.

== Career ==
Vinzzent released his debut album Een zomer lang verliefd in 2007. In 2010, Vinzzent released his most successful single called Dromendans. Dromendans is a cover of Bloubergstrand se sonsak by Kurt Darren. Dromendans ultimately reached 7th place on the Single Top 100.

In 2010, Vinzzent participated in the Dutch National Songfestival to decide who would represent the Netherlands in that year's Eurovision. While Vinzzent received the popular vote, the professional jury did not vote for him. In the end, Sieneke was sent instead. Vinzzent did serve as one of the jurors.

== Name origin ==
Vinzzent's pseudonym is an effort by Vincent Claase to sing under his own name, while also being able to be easily found on the World Wide Web. The unique double z in his name makes him easily distinguishable from other singers named Vincent.
