= Country Girl (Zahara album) =

- Country Girl Cover

Studio album by Zahara
- Released: September 21, 2015
- Recorded: 2014–2015

Zahara chronology
Phendula (2013)	Country Girl (2015)	Mgodi (2017)

Country Girl is the third studio album by the South African singer-songwriter Zahara, released on September 22, 2015. It features a guest appearance from Robbie Malinga.

The album was certified gold on the day of its release and later went triple platinum.

== Commercial performance ==
The album was certified gold within 24 hours of its release, platinum within two weeks and later went triple platinum, selling 140,000 copies.

== Accolades ==
At the 22nd ceremony of South African Music Awards Country Girl won the award for Best Produced Album and also nominated for Best Afro Album at South African Afro Music Awards in 2017.

Year	Nominee / work	Award	Result
2016	Country Girl	Best Produced Album	Won
2016	Country Girl	Female Artist of the Year	Nominated
2016	Country Girl	Best R&B/Soul/Reggae Album	Nominated
2017	Country Girl	Best Afro Album	Nominated

== Tracklisting ==
No.	Title	Length
1.	"Ntombenhle"	4:47
2.	"Bomibani"	5:21
3.	"Imali"	5:27
4.	"Inameva"	4:47
5.	"Bengirongo (featuring Robbie Malinga)"	5:08
6.	"Izintaba"	4:40
7.	"Amapleya"	4:25
8.	"Okutsha"	4:22
9.	"Walks of Life"	4:34
10.	"Country Girl"	5:20
11.	"Udali"	4:20
12.	"Who I Am"	4:09
13.	"Stop the Music"	3:57

== Personnel ==
All credits adapted from AllMusic.

- Zahara - vocals, composer
- Linda Gcwensa - composer
- Stefan Myburgh - composer
- Robbie Malinga - featured artist (track 5), composer
- Pamela Myburgh - composer

== Release history ==
Region	Date	Format	Label
South Africa	September 22, 2015	CD, Digital download	TS Records
