= Carte Blanche (TV series) =

South African TV series

- Genre: Actuality
- Country of origin: South Africa
- No. of seasons: 37

Production
- Executive producer: John Webb
- Running time: 60 minutes
- Production company: Combined Artists

Original release
- Network: M-Net
- Release: 28 August 1988 – present

Carte Blanche is a South African investigative journalism television series that airs on local television network M-Net, on Sunday nights. It premiered in 1988 and focuses on investigation into corruption, consumer issues, and current events.

== History ==
Carte Blanche began its broadcast 28 August 1988, anchored by Derek Watts and Ruda Landman. Landman left the show in 2007; the same year Bongani Bingwa became a presenter.

In January 2010, two spinoff series, Carte Blanche Medical and Carte Blanche Consumer, began. Carte Blanche Medical premiered on 18 January 2010 and was anchored by Bongani Bingwa, while Carte Blanche Consumer, premiering on 24 January 2010, was anchored by Devi Sankaree Govender. Both series, which ran for four seasons, were cancelled in 2011. Shortly thereafter, on 24 January 2011, Carte Blanche Extra launched, but was cancelled after only airing 10 episodes.

To celebrate 25 years on air on 1 September 2013, Carte Blanche broadcast from the Telkom Joburg Tower in Hillbrow, closed to the public in 1981 during a state of emergency. A book Carte Blanche 25: The Stories Behind the Stories was published, looking at memorable moments behind the scenes of South Africa's longest running current affairs show.

A Carte Blanche channel featuring coverage of the Trial of Oscar Pistorius was launched on DStv on 2 March 2014.

== Presenters ==
- Derek Watts (1988–2023) †
- Ruda Landman (1988-2007)
- Devi Sankaree Govender (2002–2020)
- John Webb (2004 - 2022)
- Bonita Nuttall (2007–2015)
- Bongani Bingwa (2007–2023)
- Claire Mawisa (2015–present)
- Macfarlane Moleli (2018–present)
- Masa Kekana (2020–present)
- Erin Bates (2023–present)
- Govan Whittles (2023–present)
- Lourensa Eckard (2023–present)
- Xola Ntshinga (2023–present)

== Carte Blanche Making a Difference Trust ==
To celebrate 20 years on air in 2008, Carte Blanche launched the Making a Difference (MAD) Trust to raise funds for specialised paediatric units in selected state hospitals and several welfare organisations across South Africa. The Trust has undertaken major paediatric ward revitalisation and capital building projects around the country and has completed over 20 projects to date.

Apart from several infrastructural upgrades at two child welfare organisations, the Carte Blanche Making a Difference Trust has in previous years supported feeding schemes and assisted in providing food parcels and managing supplies at Inchanga in KZN and Johannesburg Child Welfare and Johannesburg Parent and Child Counselling Centres in greater Johannesburg and at Hartebeespoort Dam in the North-West province.

=== Major Projects ===
==== Sebokeng Regional Hospital ====
- Paediatric Emergency Unit
- Paediatric Lower High Care Unit
- Dedicated Paediatric High Care Wards

==== Ngwelezana Hospital ====
- Paediatric Burns Outpatient Department

==== Tygerberg Hospital ====
- Neonatal and Paediatric Intensive Care Units

==== Kimberley Provincial Hospital ====
- Paediatric ICU

==== Frere Hospital ====
- Paediatric Theatre

==== King Edward VII Hospital ====
- BHP Billiton Paediatric Centre of Excellence

==== Chris Hani Baragwanath Hospital ====
- Paediatric Facilities Upgrade

==== Polokwane Hospital ====
- Neonatal ICU Improvements

==== George Hospital ====
- New Equipment and Facility Modernisation

==== Charlotte Maxeke Academic Hospital ====
- Paediatric High Care Ward
- Equipment Upgrades
- New Doctors' Rooms

== Notable Awards ==
Carte Blanche has been nominated for hundreds of awards over the past three decades, with over 200 wins behind the show's name.

Year	Nominee / work	Award	Result
2026	Kate Barry: Jozi Jacuzzi	National Press Club: TV Investigative/Actuality	Won
2026	Kate Barry: Centurion Sinkholes	National Press Club: TV Investigative/Actuality	Won
2026	Kate Barry: Coining It	National Press Club: TV Investigative/Actuality	Won
2026	Peter Rudden: Saving Sandfish	National Press Club: TV Cameraman	Won
2026	Peter Rudden: Reviving SA's Rock Art	National Press Club: TV Cameraman	Won
2026	Carte Blanche	SAFTA: Best Current Affairs Programme	Won
2025	Marion Edmunds: Epic Electric Motorcycle Road Trip	Vodacom Journalist of the Year: Sustainability - National	Won
2025	Erin Bates: Epic Electric Motorcycle Road Trip	Vodacom Journalist of the Year: Sustainability - National	Won
2025	Eaton de Jongh: Epic Electric Motorcycle Road Trip	Vodacom Journalist of the Year: Sustainability - National	Won
2025	Stenette Grosskopf: Epic Electric Motorcycle Road Trip	Vodacom Journalist of the Year: Sustainability - National	Won
2025	Carol Albertyn Christie: Chess for Change	Vodacom Journalist of the Year: Sports - Regional	Won
2025	Marion Edmunds: Contraception Question	Vodacom Journlist of the Year: Feature - Regional	Won
2025	Nicky Troll: Black Gold	Sikuvile Journalist Awards	Finalist
2025	Tarryn Crossman: Kidnapping Crisis	Sikuvile Journalist Awards	Finalist
2025	Kate Barry: Limpopo Bus Crash	National Press Club	Won
2025	Tarryn Crossman: Kidnapping Crisis	Taco Kuiper Awards	Finalist
2024	Govan Whittles	SAFTA: Best TV Presenter	Finalist
2024	Carte Blanche	Whistleblower Award	Won
2024	Nicky Troll: Shauwn Mkhize	Vodacom Journalist of the Year - Regional	Won
2024	Carol Albertyn Christie: Msunduzi's Own Goal	Vodacom Journalist of the Year - Regional	Won
2024	Catherine Rice: Knysna's Collapse	Vodacom Journalist of the Year - Regional	Won
2024	Nicky Troll: Codeine Chemist & Liquid Gold	Sikuvile Journalist Awards	Won
2024	Carte Blanche: The Podcast	AIB International Awards	Finalist
2023	Derek Watts	Vodacom Journalist of the Year: Lifetime Achievement Award	Won
2023	Harri Vithi: Parties and Puppets	Vodacom Journalist of the Year - National	Won
2023	Tarryn Crossman: Finding Zuko Nonxuba	Vodacom Journalist of the Year - Regional	Won
2023	Sipha Kema: Decades of War	Vodacom Journalist of the Year - Regional	Won
2022	Derek Watts	SAFTA: Lifetime Achievement Award	Won
2022	Carte Blanche	SAFTA: Best Current Affairs Programme	Won
2022	Nicky Troll: Mining Takedown	SAFTA: Best Current Affairs Story	Won
2021	Carte Blanche	SAFTA: Best Current Affairs Programme	Won
2021	Nicky Troll: Mining Takedown	Vodacom Journalist of the Year - National	Won
2021	Latashia Naidoo: Crypto Heist	Vodacom Journalist of the Year - National	Won
2021	Sasha Schwendenwein: What the Fog, MTI & Mr Shopper	Sanlam Financial Journalism Award - Video Category	Won
2020	Carte Blanche	Best of Joburg - Best Local TV Programme	Won
2020	Joy Summers: Citrus & Bullets	Sanlam Financial Journalism Award - Video Category	Won
2020	Carte Blanche	SAFTA: Best Current Affairs Programme	Won
2020	Tarryn Crossman: Menacing Midwife	Taco Kuiper Award for Investigative Journalism	Nominated
2019	Sasha Schwendenwein: Follow the Guns	Genesis Award - Brigitte Bardot International Award	Won
2019	Sasha Schwendenwein: Illegal Chicken Abattoir	Genesis Award - Brigitte Bardot International Award	Won
2019	Sasha Schwendenwein: Follow the Guns	SADC Media Awards: Television	Won
2019	John Webb: Palm Oil	SAB Environmental Award: Short Form/Video	Won
2019	Nicky Troll: JRA is Falling Down	Vodacom Journalist of the Year - Regional	Nominated
2019	Carte Blanche	Best of Joburg: Best Local TV Programme	Won
2019	Carol Albertyn Christie: Crashes Not Accidents	Diageo Responsible Drinking Media Awards: Journalist of the Year	Won
2018	Sasha Schwendenwein: uMhlatuze Water Board	Vodacom Journalist of the Year - Regional	Won
2018	Nicola De Chaud: Being Transgender	Vodacom Journalist of the Year - Regional	Won
2018	Annalise Lubbe: Abalone Poaching	Vodacom Journalist of the Year - Regional	Won
2018	Sasha Schwendenwein: Illegal Chicken Abattoir	SAB Environmental Award: TV & Online	Won
2018	Sasha Schwendenwein: Follow the Guns	SAB Environmental Award: TV & Online	Won
2018	Joy Summers: Lion Bones	SAB Environmental Award: TV & Online	Won
2018	Carte Blanche: Best News & Current Affairs Promo	ProMax Africa Awards	Won
2018	Carte Blanche: Title Sequence	ProMax Africa Awards	Won
2018	Carte Blanche: Best Documentary & Factual Entertainment Promo	ProMax Africa Awards	Won
2017	Sasha Schwendenwein: Dirty Rivers	SAB Environmental Awards: Video	Won
2017	Anna-Maria van Niekerk & Marzanne van den Berg	SAB Environmentnal Journalist of the Year	Won
2017	Carol Albertyn Christie	SAB Environmental Journalist of the Year	Won
2017	Michael Duffett: Doctors' Working Hours	Discovery Health Journalist: Best TV Health Journalism	Won
2017	Anna-Maria van Niekerk: Missing Millions	Discovery Health Journalist: Best TV Journalist of the Year	Won

== See also ==
- Combined Artists
- DStv
- MultiChoice
- M-Net Literary Awards
- List of South African television series
