= Loliwe (song) =

Single by Zahara

from the album Loliwe
- Released: August 31, 2011
- Recorded: 2011
- Genre: Afro-soul
- Length: 4:32
- Label: TS Records
- Songwriter(s): Bulelwa Mkutukana
- Producer(s): Robbie Malinga; Mojalefa Thebe

Zahara singles chronology
"Loliwe" (2011)	"Ndiza" (2011)

Music video
- "Loliwe" on YouTube

"Loliwe" is a song by South African singer-songwriter Zahara. It was officially released on August 31, 2011, serving as the lead single from her debut studio album of the same name.

== Background and recording ==
In an interview with NTV Kenya, Zahara described "Loliwe" as a song written to inspire one to achieve their destiny through patience and perseverance. Zahara said the song is primarily about the train that transported her fathers and forefathers from Johannesburg to East London during the Apartheid era. Furthermore, she said many people had hope that the train will bring their loved ones back. "Loliwe" was composed with a five-string guitar.

== Music video ==
The music video for "Loliwe" was produced by Mastermax Films.

== Accolades ==
"Loliwe" earned Zahara the awards for Female Artist of the Year and Newcomer of the Year at the 18th South African Music Awards. The song won Best Selling Full-Track Download of the Year at the aforementioned awards ceremony, as well as Song of the Year at the 2011 Metro FM Music Awards. It enabled Zahara to win Best Female Artist from Southern Africa at the 2012 Kora Awards, as well as received a nomination for African Artist Of The Year at The Headies 2012. Moreover, the song won Best Selling Ring-Back-Tone at the 19th Annual South African Music Awards. The music video for "Loliwe" won Best Female Video at the 2012 Channel O Music Video Awards.

Year	Awards ceremony	Award description(s)	Results
2013	South African Music Awards	Best Selling Ring-Back-Tone	Won
2012	Kora Awards	Best Female Artist from Southern Africa (for "Loliwe")	Won
2012	Channel O Music Video Awards	Best Female Video	Won
2012	South African Music Awards	Newcomer of the Year (for "Loliwe")	Won
2012	South African Music Awards	Female Artist of the Year (for "Loliwe")	Won
2012	South African Music Awards	Best Selling Full-Track Download of the Year	Won
2012	The Headies 2012	African Artist of the Year (for "Loliwe")	Nominated
2011	Metro FM Music Awards	Song of the Year	Won

== Track listing ==
Digital single

No.	Title	Writer(s)	Length
1.	"Loliwe"	Bulelwa Mkutukana	4:32

== Video release history ==
Country	Date	Format	Label
South Africa	August 31, 2011	Digital download	TS Records
