= Doug Kazé =

Nigerian musician

- Born: Douglas Eric Kaze; 24 February 1979 (age 47); Jos, Plateau State, Nigeria
- Genres: Afrosoul, Afrofolk, Soul, Blues, Hip hop
- Occupations: Singer, songwriter, writer, lecturer
- Instruments: Vocals, guitar
- Years active: 2014–present
- Label: Rudeshock Records
- Website: dougkaze.com

Douglas Eric Kazé (born 24 February 1979), better known as Doug Kazé, is a Nigerian musician.

== Early life and education ==
Doug was born in 1979 to David and Margaret Kaze in Jos, Nigeria. He is the third of seven children. He attended primary schools in Jos and Pankshin, where the family stayed briefly. Doug grew up around music – his father was a lover of Bob Marley's music and the music of other reggae musicians. As a child, Doug started developing interest in music and began to make attempts at songwriting in his late primary school days. His songwriting started taking shape when he started secondary school. He wrote a lot of songs for himself and for his friends. At the age of 12, Doug started a group with his friends. While in secondary school at St. Murumba, Doug discovered hip-hop and that would become his major musical interest throughout his secondary school days.

After several failed attempts at starting an independent music group and a journey across genres, in 2004, eventually, he founded a Jos-based rock band, Trybe of the Sealed, and worked with them for about ten years. During these years, Doug focused more on writing and performing songs in the rock genre, while also exploring fusion possibilities with sounds from his indigenous Plateau and northern Nigerian sounds. It was however when he left Nigeria for South Africa for doctoral studies at Rhodes University that he began to return to all the genres he had explored in his musical journey and began to be intentional about his current afro-folk/soul sound. His present sound is influenced by artists like Tracy Chapman, Ali Farka Touré, and Boubacar Traoré.

== Career ==
In 2014, Doug released two singles, 'Ya Mai Iko' and 'Run for Me'. Later in the same year, he released his first self-titled album 'Doug Kazé'. His vision for the album was to introduce his sound, the fusions of soul and local sounds, and to address issues such as human trafficking and other social problems. Doug wrote most of the songs in South Africa while working on his doctoral research, and worked with producer Victor Itse Bala (VIC) on the project. The album contains songs in English, Izere and Hausa. In 2016, Doug released his second studio album 'Paradigm Shift', also produced by Victor Itse Bala. This album went on to win the Album of the Year Award at the Jos Gospel Art and Music Awards (JOGAMAs) a year later. In 2017 Doug embarked on a tour to promote his music, where he was featured at the Abuja Writers Forum's (AWF).

Sponsored by Music in Africa and Siemens Foundation, Doug performed with his band in different cities in Nigeria.

During the COVID-19 lockdowns of 2020, Doug recorded and released his third album 'BRAVE', produced by his band member and keyboardist, Tapshak Raymond. Songs from this album enjoyed radio airplay and was nominated for JOGAMA 2021 album of the year.

Doug is a senior lecturer at his alma mater, the University of Jos.

== Personal life ==
Doug is married and has two sons. He is a practicing Christian. Doug holds a PhD in English from Rhodes University, South Africa. Doug enjoys reading and often attends book reading sessions. His most recent attendance was at a reading of the political economic satire, We Need You Poor So That We Can Rule: The Voice of the Political Manipulator.

== Discography ==
- Ya Mai Iko (single, 2014)
- Run for Me (single, 2014)
- Doug Kazé (album, 2014)
- Paradigm Shift (album, 2016)
- Weep Not Child (single, 2019)
- BRAVE (single, 2020)
- Before Dawn (hip-hop) (single, 2021)
- Balcony (single, 2022)
- BRAVE (album, 2021)

== Awards and nominations ==
Year	Award	Category	Nominee(s)	Result	Ref.
2017	JOGAMA	Album of the year.	Paradigm Shift	Won	
2021	JOGAMA	Album of the year.	BRAVE	Nominated	
