= Songololo: Voices of Change =

- Directed by: Marianne Kaplan
- Written by: Merrily Weisbord
- Produced by: Marianne Kaplan; Cari Green
- Starring: Gcina Mhlophe; Mzwakhe Mbuli; Johnny Clegg; Nadine Gordimer; Walter Sisulu
- Cinematography: Dewald Aukema
- Music by: Salvador Ferreras
- Production company: MSK Productions
- Distributed by: National Film Board of Canada; TVOntario
- Release date: 1990
- Running time: 54 minutes
- Country: Canada
- Language: English

Songololo: Voices of Change is a Canadian documentary film, directed by Marianne Kaplan and released in 1990. An examination of South Africa in the earliest days of the transition from apartheid to democracy, the film explores the power of music and art as tools of activism and social change, focusing primarily on writer Gcina Mhlophe and musician Mzwakhe Mbuli.

The film received selected theatrical screenings in Canada in October 1990, before having its television premiere on TVOntario and Knowledge Network in November. Its broadcast on TVOntario was as an episode of the network's documentary series Human Edge.

The film was a Genie Award nominee for Best Short Documentary Film at the 12th Genie Awards in 1991.
