= Derek Watts =

South Africa television presenter and investigative journalist (1948–2023)

- Born: Derek Neil Watts; 24 November 1948; Hillbrow, Johannesburg, Transvaal, Union of South Africa.
- Died: 22 August 2023 (aged 74); Johannesburg, South Africa
- Occupations: Journalist; television presenter; podcaster
- Employer: Carte Blanche on M-Net
- Spouse: Belinda Watts
- Children: Kirsten Watts & Tyrone Watts

Derek Neil Watts (24 November 1948 – 22 August 2023) was a South African investigative reporter and television presenter who worked for Carte Blanche, on M-Net for 35 years from 1988 until 2023.

== Early life and education ==
Watts was born on 24 November 1948 in Hillbrow, in the heart of Johannesburg, Transvaal. He later moved to the second largest city in Zimbabwe, Bulawayo (then Southern Rhodesia), when he was five years old and grew up there.

== Illness and death ==
In 2022, Watts was diagnosed with skin cancer that later spread to his lungs. He was admitted to hospital in March 2023 after suffering a suspected stroke and was subsequently diagnosed with severe sepsis. In July, he announced his retirement from Carte Blanche after 35 years. Watts died on 22 August 2023 at age 74.
