= Robot Boii =

South African media personality (born 1993)

- Born: Mzwakhe Mthandeni Ntshengula Mbuli Jr. 19 November 1993 (age 32); Soweto, Gauteng, South Africa
- Education: Midrand Graphic Institute
- Occupations: Influencer; dancer; musician
- Years active: 2008–present
- Father: Mzwakhe Mbuli
- Musical career
- Genre: Amapiano
- Instruments: Vocal; piano; drum
- Label: Gallo Record Company

Mzwakhe Mthandeni Ntshengula Mbuli Jr. (born 19 November 1993) known professionally as Robot Boii, is a South African media personality, musician and dancer. He is best known for his signature robotic style. He won the 2021 South African Hip Hop Awards for Best Dance Act and 2023 Trace Africa Award for Best Dancer in Africa.

== Early life ==
Mbuli Jr. was born and raised in Soweto, Gauteng , South Africa. He attended Mondeor High School and later studied graphic design at the Midrand Graphic Institute. He is the son of Mzwakhe Mbuli. He began dancing when he was doing grade 6. When he was 15, he was featured in a YouTube video of Chad Smith and he joined a Lyrical Sneakers from his school dance crew, where they competed in the South African Dance Company and Urban Dance competitions.

== Career ==
Mbuli Jr. began his entertainment career as a dancer and performer, initially appearing in commercial advertising and other media productions. His early advertising work included campaigns for Coca-Cola, Wimpy and 8ta. In 2020, during the COVID-19 lockdown, he became a presenter of Channel O's Lockdown House Party. He later appeared and worked as a presenter on platforms including YFM, SABC1 and MTV Base Africa. His SABC 1 television appearances included Zaziwa and Siyabonga. In 2021, he won the Best Dance Act award at the South African Hip Hop Awards.

In 2022, Mbuli Jr. released the single "Salary Salary" with Mellow & Sleazy and Soul Revolver featuring Shaunmusiq and Ftears, which later became associated with dance challenges on TikTok. He hosted the South Africa Music Awards first ceremony with comedian Mpho Popps, which was held at City Superbowl, Rustenburg on 27 August 2022. He also realeased "Uxolo" and "Mwagia Ndani" singles. In 2023, he received the Best Dancer award at the inaugural Trace Africa Awards, held in Kigali, Rwanda. He joined the Podcast and Chill Network to co-hosted the podcast Popcorn and Cheese Podcast with Mpho Popps.

In 2024, Mbuli Jr. won two awards at the Top 16 Youth-Owned Brands Awards (Yoba) for Top Personalities & Influencers and Overall Top Brand Award. He left the Popcorn and Cheese Podcast in July 2024. In 2025, he partnered with AXE to motivate and electricying blend of music to South African higher institutions. In February 2026, he was honoured at the inaugural Humanz Top 20 Awards 2026 for Top 20 Creators. In July, he joined The Masked Singer South Africa season 3 as "Mosquito" and finished as the runner-up. In August, he made his role in Zola 7 music video for his single "She Nailed It".

== Awards and nominations ==
| Year | Award | Category | Nominated works | Result | Ref. |
|---|---|---|---|---|---|
| 2021 | South African Hip Hop Awards | Best Dance Act | Himself | Won | |
| 2023 | Trace Africa Awards | Best Dancer in Africa | Himself | Won | |
| 2024 | Top 16 Youth-Owned Brands Awards | Top Personalities & Influencers Brand | Himself | Won | |
| 2024 | Top 16 Youth-Owned Brands Awards | Overall Top Brand Award | Himself | Won | |
| 2026 | Humanz Top 20 Awards | Top 20 Creators | Himself | Honoured | |
