= Zahara (South African musician) =

South African musician (1987–2023)

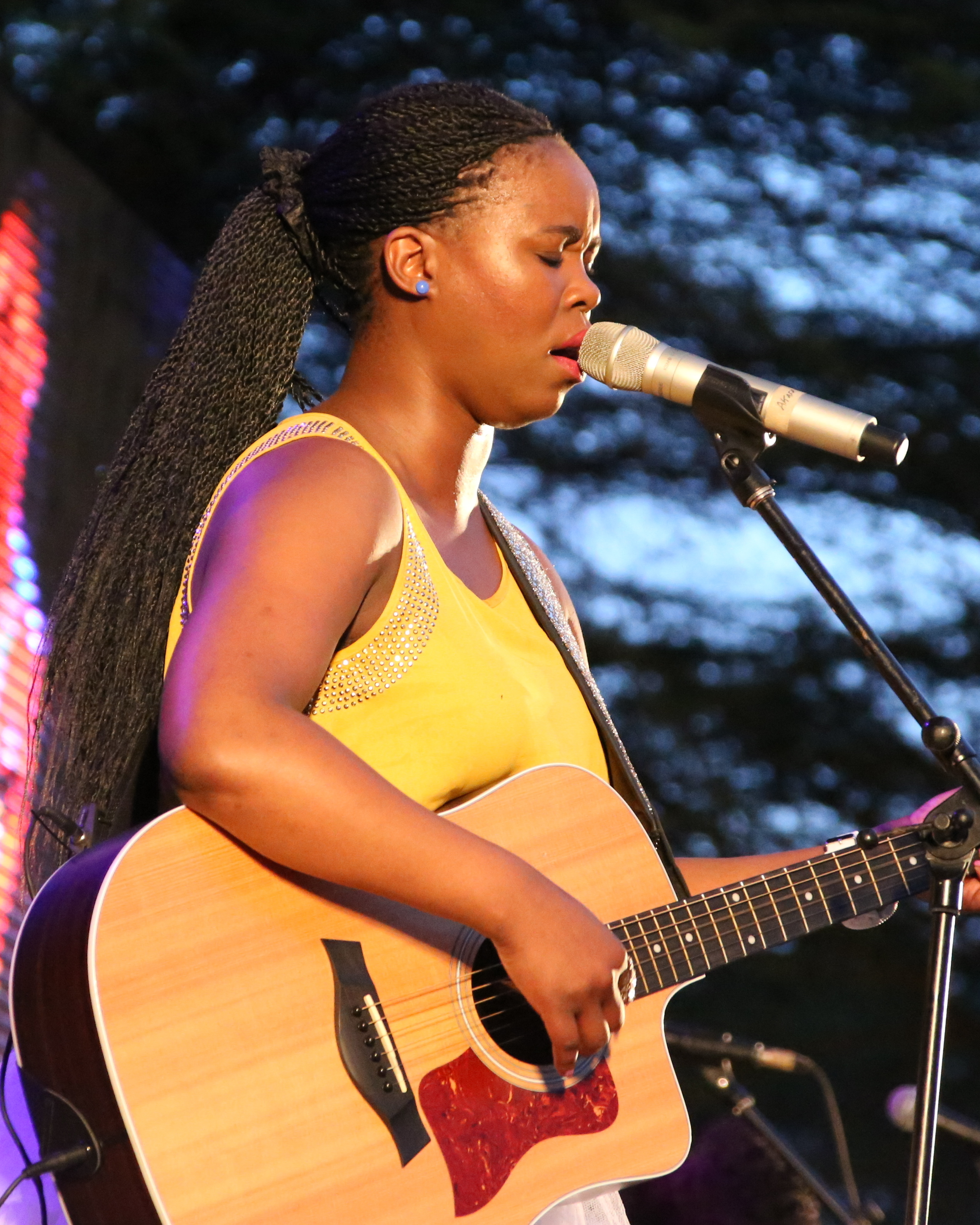
- Zahara performing in Nairobi, 2013

Background information
- Also known as: Zahara
- Born: Bulelwa Mkutukana; 9 November 1987; East London, South Africa
- Died: 11 December 2023 (aged 36) Johannesburg, South Africa
- Genres: Afro-soul
- Occupations: Musician; singer
- Instruments: Vocals; acoustic guitar
- Years active: 2009–2023
- Labels: TS; EMI; Music Lives Here; Warner

Bulelwa Mkutukana (9 November 1987 – 11 December 2023), known by her stage name Zahara, was a South African singer, songwriter and guitarist. Her music was classified loosely as "Afro-soul", and she sang in Xhosa, her native language, as well as in English.

After signing a record deal with TS Records, Mkutukana's debut album, Loliwe (2011), went double platinum. Her second album, Phendula (2013), produced three chart-topping singles "Phendula", "Impilo", and "Stay". Zahara's third album, Country Girl (2015), was certified triple platinum. Following her departure from TS Records, she signed a record deal with Warner Music. Her fourth album, Mgodi (2017), was her best-selling album and was certified platinum, while her fifth album, Nqaba Yam (2021), peaked at number 1 on iTunes.

Her accolades included seventeen South African Music Awards, three Metro FM Awards, and one Nigeria Entertainment Award. Zahara was on the 2020 list of the BBC's 100 Women. She appeared as a guest judge on the seventeenth season of Idols South Africa in 2021.

== Early life ==
Born as Bulelwa Mkutukana in the Phumlani Informal Settlement of East London in Eastern Cape, South Africa, Zahara was raised there with her parents Nokhaya and Mlamli Mkutukana, the sixth of seven children. Zahara started singing in her school's choir when she was six years old, becoming the lead singer there, and at the age of nine, she was asked to join the senior choir because of her strong voice. Her stage name means "blooming flower" in Arabic. As a child, she was known by the nickname "Spinach" after her love of vegetables.

== Career ==
Zahara's music is classified loosely as "Afro-soul" and she sang in her native language, Xhosa, as well as in English. Her music has been described as a mixture of styles popularized by Tracy Chapman and India Arie.

Zahara started her career busking on the streets of East London. She was signed to the label TS Records by TK Nciza.

Zahara's debut album Loliwe was released in 2011, with the first issue being sold out within 72 hours. Nineteen days later, the album sold more than 100,000 copies, reaching double platinum status in South Africa. This made her the second musician to reach this figure in such record time after Brenda Fassie, also a Xhosa native. Zahara released her first live DVD The Beginning Live in 2012, featuring X-Factor USA contestant LeRoy Bell, which reached platinum in one day, according to the standards set by the Recording Industry of South Africa.

On 1 May 2012, at the annual South African Music Awards, Zahara won eight awards, including "Best Female Artist" and "Album of the Year".

In 2013, Zahara released her second studio album, Phendula, which won three South African Music Awards for Best Selling Album, Best R&B, Soul and Reggae Album and Best Female Artist of the Year. The same year, Nelson Mandela invited her to his home to perform a private bedside concert. She then composed "Nelson Mandela" in his honour and released it as an EP.

=== 2014–2018: Country Girl, Mgodi ===
In July 2014, Zahara's younger brother was murdered in East London. According to Zahara, she went through a period of depression after his death, but recovered enough for the 2015 release of Country Girl. In 2015 at the Eastern Cape Music Awards, she won the two awards "Best Female" and "Best Artist 3".

In early 2017, Zahara signed with Warner Music South Africa. On 13 October 2017, she released her fourth studio album Mgodi, which went gold after only six hours. To further support the album, Zahara embarked on her Africa All Star Music Festival, visiting three venues in United States. The tour began in Toronto, Canada, on 17 August 2019, and concluded on 24 August 2019, in Washington, D.C.

Mgodi won Best Female Act at the 2018 Next Generation Entertainment Awards.

=== 2021–2023: Nqaba Yam ===
Following a four-year hiatus, Zahara announced her fifth studio album on CapeTalk site and later released the album's lead single "Nyamezela" on 7 May 2021. On 30 July 2021, she released a second single "Nqaba Yam". The album was initially set to be released on 9 July 2021, but was delayed due to COVID-19 lockdowns and finally released on 13 August 2021.

In December 2021, she teased her first Amapiano single on Twitter. In November 2023, Zahara's debut amapiano single,"Guqa Ngedolo" was released.

=== Television ===
In 2021, she made her television debut as a guest judge for Idols South Africa season 17, alongside Dineo Ranaka.

== Death ==
On 11 December 2023, Zahara died at a hospital in Johannesburg, at age 36. She had been admitted mid-November with liver complications which worsened until she became unresponsive. She had suffered with liver disease after problems with alcoholism, according to her manager in 2019.

== Discography ==
Studio albums

- Loliwe (2011)
- Phendula (2013)
- Country Girl (2015)
- Mgodi (2017)
- Nqaba Yam (2021)

== Awards and nominations ==
List of awards and nominations received by Zahara
Year	Event	Prize	Nominated work	Result	Ref.
2014	African Muzik Magazine Awards	Best Female Southern Africa		Won	
2014	20th Annual South African Music Awards	Best Selling Album	Phendula	Won	
2014	20th Annual South African Music Awards	Female Artist of the Year	Phendula	Won	
2014	20th Annual South African Music Awards	Best RnB, Soul and Reggae	Phendula	Nominated	
2014	Metro FM Music Awards	Best African Pop Album	Phendula	Nominated	
2014	Metro FM Music Awards	Best Female Artist		Nominated	
2014	Metro FM Music Awards	Song of the Year	"Phendula"	Nominated	
2013	Nigeria Entertainment Awards	Southern African Artist of the Year		Won	
2013	19th Annual South African Music Awards	Best Collaboration	"Thetha Nami" (Riot featuring Zahara)	Won	
2013	19th Annual South African Music Awards	Best Collaboration	"Hold On (Bambelela)" (Zahara featuring LeRoy Bell and the Soweto Gospel Choir)	Nominated	
2013	19th Annual South African Music Awards	Best Live DVD	The Beginning Live	Nominated	
2013	19th Annual South African Music Awards	MTN SAMA Record of the Year	"Umthwalo"	Nominated	
2013	19th Annual South African Music Awards	Best Selling Ring-Back-Tone	"Loliwe"	Won	
2012	Kora Awards	Best Female Artist from Southern Africa	"Loliwe"	Won	
2012	Channel O Music Video Awards	Best Female Video	"Loliwe"	Won	
2012	18th Annual South African Music Awards	Best Smooth Urban Music Album	Loliwe	Won	
2012	18th Annual South African Music Awards	Best Collaboration	"Incwad' Encane" (Zahara featuring Georgie Munetsi)	Won	
2012	18th Annual South African Music Awards	Best Selling Album	Loliwe	Won	
2012	18th Annual South African Music Awards	Newcomer of the Year	"Loliwe"	Won	
2012	18th Annual South African Music Awards	Female Artist of the Year	"Loliwe"	Won	
2012	18th Annual South African Music Awards	Album of the Year	Loliwe	Won	
2012	18th Annual South African Music Awards	Best Selling Full-Track Download of the Year	"Loliwe"	Won	
2012	18th Annual South African Music Awards	Remix of the Year	"Lengoma" (DJ Sbu featuring Zahara)	Won	
2012	The Headies	African Artist of the Year	"Loliwe"	Nominated	
2011	Metro FM Music Awards ^{[A]}	Best Produced Album	Loliwe	Nominated	
2011	Metro FM Music Awards ^{[A]}	Best Female Album	Loliwe	Won	
2011	Metro FM Music Awards ^{[A]}	Best Newcomer		Nominated	
2011	Metro FM Music Awards ^{[A]}	Song of the Year	"Loliwe"	Won	
2011	Metro FM Music Awards ^{[A]}	Hit Single of the Year	"Lengoma" (DJ Sbu featuring Zahara)	Won	
2011	Feather Awards	Musician (Zakes Bantwini and Zahara)		Won	
2017	South African Afro Music Awards	Herself	Best Afro Female Artist	Nominated	
2017	South African Afro Music Awards	Country Girl	Best Afro Album	Nominated	
2019	Eastern Cape Music Awards	Best EC National Recognised Artist	Herself	Nominated	
2020	Africa Entertainment Awards USA 2020	Best Female Artist	Herself	Won	
2020	Africa Entertainment Awards USA 2020	Best Female Artist	Herself	Nominated	
2024	South African Afro Music Awards	Best Afro Album of Democracy		Pending	
2024	South African Afro Music Awards	Best Female Afro Soul Artist of Democracy		Pending	

Notes

- A The Metro FM Music Awards were not held in 2012 due to re-positioning. The award ceremony was held in 2013.
