= Abdul Khoza =

South African actor (born 1987)

- Born: 14 August 1987 (age 39); KwaMashu KwaZulu-Natal Durban
- Citizenship: South Africa
- Occupation: actor
- Known for: Isibaya as Qaphela Ngwenya,, Winning the second competition show class act 2011
- Spouse: Baatile Khoza (m. 2019)
- Children: 2
- Relatives: Sthembiso Khoza (brother)
- Awards: South African and Television Awards 2018 DSTV Mzanzi Viewers Choice Awards 2022

Abdul Khoza (born 14 August 1987) is a South African actor, television presenter, and musician. He gained fame for portraying Nqoba Zulu in the Mzansi Magic telenovela The Wife and for winning the second season of the SABC 1 reality competition Class Act in 2011.

== Early life ==
Born and raised in KwaMashu, Durban, KwaZulu-Natal, Khoza grew up in a township. His father Stan Khoza is the national president of the Independent Municipal and Allied Trade Union and his brother is actor and television presenter Sthembiso "sk" Khoza.

== Career ==
After high school, Khoza served in the army and worked as a firefighter. Khoza launched his acting career in 2011 by winning the second season of Class Act. His first major role came in 2013 as Two Step, a rising soccer star, in the second season of SABC 1's drama series Intersexions. In 2015, he played a doctor in the SABC 1 soap opera Uzalo and portrayed Bheki Buthelezi in Mzansi Magic's The Road. From 2016 to 2021, he starred as Qaphela Ngwenya, the son of a character played by the late Menzi Ngubane, in the telenovela Isibaya.

== Filmography ==
- Class Act, Season 2 (2011)
- Intersexions, Season 2 (2013)
- Red Ink (2014)
- Uzalo, Season 1 (2015)
- Isibaya, Seasons 4-8 (2014-2018)
- The Wife, Seasons 1 and 2 (2021)
- Kings of Jo'burg, Seasons 1 and 3 (2020)
- Ekhaya Backpackers, Season 1 (2024)
- Masinga-The Calling (2024)
- Shaka iLembe, Seasons 1 and 2 (2023-2025)
- Durban Gen, Season 1
- Ngobile, Season 1
- Ring of Lies, Season 2
- Tempy Pushas, Season 1
- My Brother's Keeper, Season 2

== Personal life ==
Khoza married Baatile Khoza (née Themane) in 2019. The couple has two children.

== Recognition ==
- Best Actor nomination in the SA Film and Television Awards.
- Best Supporting Actor in a Telenovela (2018) as Qaphela in Isibaya, South African Film and Television Award.
- DSTV Mzanzi Viewers' Choice Award for his role in Showmax's The Wife.
- Best Supporting Actor at the National Film and Television Awards (nominated) for The Wife
- Favorite Actor (2022) DStv Mzansi Viewers' Choice Awards
