= Devi Sankaree Govender =

South African investigative journalist

- Born: September 5, 1972 (age 54); Umzinto, Natal, South Africa
- Education: University of KwaZulu-Natal; University of South Africa
- Occupations: Journalist; News Presenter
- Years active: 1996–present
- Notable work: Carte Blanche; The Devi Show

Devi Sankaree Govender (born 5 September 1972) is a South African investigative journalist, television personality, and media professional. She is best known for her long-standing role as a journalist and presenter on Carte Blanche, M-Net's flagship investigative programme, as well as hosting her own talk show, The Devi Show.

== Early life and education ==
Govender was born in Umzinto, KwaZulu-Natal, South Africa. She began her journalism career at age 21 as a freelance presenter at SABC Radio while completing a BA at the University of Natal.

She went on to earn an Honours in Drama and Performance Studies, a Higher Diploma in Education, a postgraduate diploma in Business Management, and an MBA from the University of Natal.

== Career ==
Govender started in radio, hosting chat and music shows on Lotus FM before entering print media. In 1998 she became a weekly columnist, later Durban features editor, for the Sunday Times. Her television breakout came in 1996 as a continuity presenter on SABC 1's Eastern Mosaic.

She joined Carte Blanche in 2002, where her investigative work included coverage of corruption at medical institutions, the Arms Deal, health crises, and scandals like Nkandla.

In 2020 she launched The Devi Show on e.tv and eNCA. The series won the South African Film and Television Award for Best Factual Programme in 2021, and she was also awarded Presenter of the Year award in 2024.

== See also ==
- Carte Blanche
- M-Net
- South African television
- Leanne Manas
- Debora Patta
- Investigative journalism
