= Holly Rey =

South African singer-songwriter

- Born: Holly Wasserfall; 27 December 1996 (age 29); Westville, KwaZulu-Natal, South Africa
- Education: University of KwaZulu-Natal
- Occupation: Musician
- Years active: 2010–present

Holly Wasserfall (born 27 December 1996), professionally known as Holly Rey, is a South African singer and songwriter. Her musical career began at the age of 14, signing her first publishing deal with Sony. She rose to prominence after releasing her single "Deeper" in 2018, which won Record of the Year. She is the first person to win the Masked Singer South Africa in 2023.

== Education ==
In 2019, Rey graduated at the University of KwaZulu-Natal (UKZN) in Media studies.

== Career ==
She grew up in musical background her uncle is a musician, he taught Rey how to play the guitar during their lessons. Rey signed a record deal with Sony and released her first album Strawberry Skies in 2010.

Her breakthrough single "Deeper" was released in May 2018. The song was produced by Mondli Ngcobo. It won Record of the Year at the 25th South African Music Awards.

On March 15, 2019, her single "You" was released. The song surpassed 3,5 million streams and was certified 3× platinum by the Recording Industry of South Africa with sales of 293 055 units. In August 2019, Rey headlined to One Big Night in Sobekeng concert.

In March 2020, she signed a record deal with Soulstic Music.

In April 29, she announced the title and the release date of her EP via her Instagram account. Unconditional EP was released on April 29, 2022.

Rey and Blxckie released "Slow Down" on April 28, 2023.

Towards the end of August 2023, Rey competed on the Masked Singer South Africa and won becoming the first person to hold the title.

Same month, Rey announced her extended play 3 AM Pt. 1, released on September 15, 2023.

== Discography ==
=== Extended plays ===
- Unconditional (2022)
- Unconditional (Stripped) (2022)
- 3 AM Pt. 1 (2023)

== Singles ==
=== As lead artist ===
List of singles as lead artist, with selected chart positions and certifications, showing year released and album name
| Title | Year | Peak chart positions | Certifications | Album |
| Title | Year | ZA | Certifications | Album |
|---|---|---|---|---|
| "Deeper" | 2018 | | | |
| "You" | 2019 | | | |
| "Home" | 2020 | — | | |
| "Slow Down" (featuring Blxckie) | 2023 | — | | |
| "Ngiyazifela" | 2023 | — | | |
| "These Tears (featuring Mr. Luu) | 2024 | — | | Non-album single |
"—" denotes a recording that did not chart or was not released in that territory.

== Achievements ==
=== Basadi in Music Awards ===
| Year | Nominee / work | Award | Result | Ref. |
|---|---|---|---|---|
| 2022 | Herself | Artist of the Year | Nominated | |
| 2022 | Herself | Pop Artist of the Year | Won | |
| 2023 | Herself | Pop Artist of the Year | Won | |

=== Dance Music Awards South Africa ===
| Year | Nominee / work | Award | Result | Ref. |
|---|---|---|---|---|
| 2019 | Herself | Best Female Vocalist | Nominated | |
