= Mpho Popps =

South African comedian and actor

Mpho Popps Modikoane
- Born: Mpho Modikoane; 10 June 1987 (age 39); Mondeor, Soweto, South Africa
- Occupation: Comedian • actor • tv host • podcaster
- Known for: Ayeye

Mpho "Popps" Modikoane (born 10 June 1987) is a South African comedian, TV host, podcaster and actor. He is the current host of the The Masked Singer South Africa on SABC 3.

He starred in the 2015 Showmax series Ayeye, and 2023 Netflix film Big Nunu's Little Heist as Sargent Seretse.

== Career ==
=== Television ===
Mpho commentated on season two of the Vuzu show 10 over 10 in 2013.From 2014 to 2015, he hosted Your Perfect Sishebo Show, SABC1 reality competition cooking series. In June 2016, he contested on Lip Sync Battle Africa, celebrity competition show.

Mpho was announced as the host of the 28th ceremony of South African Music Awards with Robot Boii in August 2022. Same month in 2022, he bagged a role as the host of the 16th Annual South African Film and Television Awards.

In June 2023, Mpho became a host of The Masked Singer South Africa TV singing competition aired on SABC 3. He landed in a role of Sargent Seretse police officer, in Big Nunu's Little Heist, premiered on Netflix on 28 July 2023. In April 2024, he won Comedian of the Year at 11th Savanna Comics' Choice Awards.

=== Podcasting ===
Mpho joined the Podcast and Chill Network to host Popcorn and Cheese Podcast, alongside Robot Boii and fellow comedian Tsitsi Chiumya. The podcast went on a production break and dropped its last episode on 12 June 2024. They address their community of viewers as the cheese-gang or cheeseboys and cheesegirls.

After their break the podcast has since been called PNC (People Need Comedy) with Mpho, Tsitsi Chiumya, and a new host, Farieda, with contributions from Thabiso Mhlongo and Shanray Abrahams. He then left Mac G's network and started his own podcast network, SABS, alongside Tsitsi Chiumya, Thabiso Mhlongo and Shandray Andrews.

== Personal life ==
Mpho is married to Latoya Modikoane, together they have one daughter Imani Modikoane.

== Achievements ==
=== Savanna Comics Choice Awards ===
Year	Nominee / work	Award	Result	Ref.
2024	Himself	Comedian of the Year Award	Won	

=== South African Film and Television Awards ===
Year	Nominee / work	Award	Result	Ref.
2024	Himself	Best TV Presenter	Nominated	
