= Kurt Darren =

South African singer/songwriter

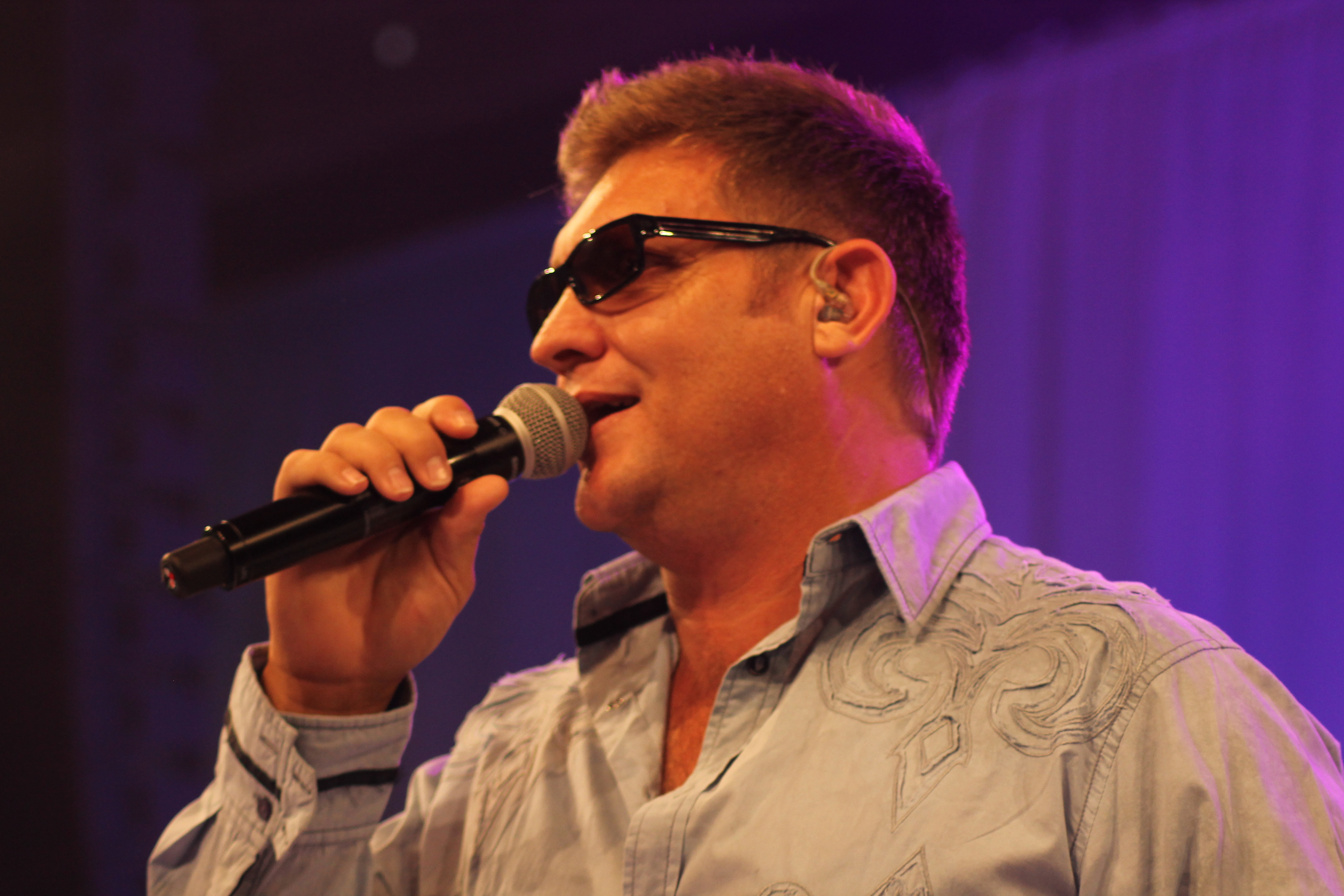
- Darren performing in 2014

Background information
- Born: Kurt Johan van Heerden; 19 February 1970 (age 56)
- Origin: Pretoria, South Africa
- Genres: Pop, dance-pop, pop rock
- Years active: 1995–present
- Website: www.kurtdarren.co.za

Kurt Johan van Heerden (born 19 February 1970), better known as Kurt Darren, is a South African singer, songwriter and television presenter, who won seven South African Music Awards (SAMA) from 2007 to 2011. He has also appeared in a number of South African films.

His debut was with the album For Your Precious Love released in 1995. From 2006 to 2011, Darren was the presenter of the popular South African show Jukebox broadcast on kykNET. During the programme, callers would have the opportunity to request and dedicate music videos of their choice. SMS (text) messages would also roll in during the program. The program was broadcast live on various radio stations as well on Sunday evenings.

== Popularity in Europe ==
Many of Kurt Darren's songs in Afrikaans are known in Europe through cover versions particularly by artists in the Netherlands and Belgium, and to some extent in Germany and Austria. Songs covered in Dutch include "Staan Op", covered by Jan Smit as "Sta Op", "Meisie Meisie" by Henk Wijngaard as "Meissie Meissie", "Kaptein Span die Seile" as "Kap'tein" by Bart Kaëll, "Hemel op Tafelberg" as "Die Zomer Gaat Nooit Voorbij" by Wim Soutaer, "Af en af" by Helemaal Hollands and "Bloubergstrand se sonsak" as "Dromendans" by Vinzzent, while Klostertaler covered "Meisie Meisie" in German and Mickie Krause covered "Kaptein Span die Seile" in German as "Chantal".

== Personal life ==
In 2009, Kurt Darren set a new record for "bokdrol vêr spoeg" a traditional South African sport at church carnivals.

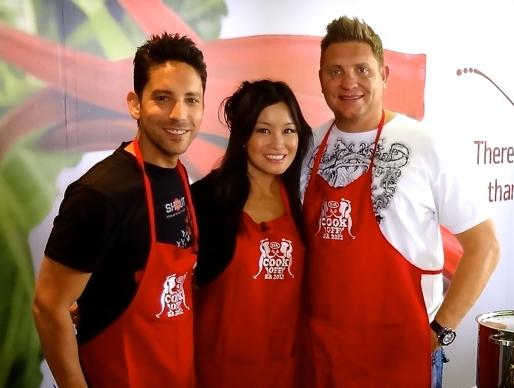
Kurt Darren (right) with Danny K and Jen Su during the Cook-off SA Challenge 2012

Darren married South African model Dunay Nortjé on 8 January 2011. They have a daughter, Kyrah, and a son, Kade.

On 7 July 2013, Darren suffered serious injuries as a result of a car accident on his way home after watching a rugby match. His agent Marnus Bisschoff and his secretary were also seriously injured. All were airlifted urgently to hospital, where tests showed Darren had 11 broken ribs and serious injuries to his head. He was released after weeks of treatment. Many of his scheduled concerts had to be canceled. He returned to active life months later with a rescheduled gig dates and a tour in US and Europe beginning in 2014.

== Discography ==
=== Albums ===
- 1995: For Your Precious Love
- 1997: Just When I Needed You Most
- 1998: Kurt Darren
- 2000: Since I Found You
- 2001: Net Jy Alleen
- 2002: Meisie Meisie
- 2003: Sê Net Ja
- 2004: Staan Op
- 2005: Vat my, maak my joune
- 2006: Lekker Lekker
- 2007: Voorwaarts Mars
- 2008: 30 Goue Sokkietreffers
- 2008: Uit die diepte van my hart
- 2009: Smiling Back at Me
- 2009: Die Beste Medisyne
- 2010: Met Liefde/With Love
- 2010: Oos-Wes Tuis Bes (deluxe edition)
- 2011: Kurt Kaptein se platinum treffers
- 2012: In jou oë
- 2014: Seerower
- 2015: Lied Vir Die Vrou
- 2016: Sal Jy Met My Dans?
- 2017: Laat Die Dansvloer Brand
- 2019: #Partytjiedier

=== Singles / videography ===
(Selective)

in Afrikaans

- "Meisie Meisie"
- "Staan Op"
- "Kom ons Dans in Afrikaans"
- "Kaptein"
- "Af en af"
- "Lekker Lekke" (2007)
- "Voorwaarts Mars" (2008)
- "Hemel op Tafelberg" (2009)
- "Daar Doer in die Donker" (2008)
- "Loslappie" (2009)
- "Bloubergstrand se sonsak" (2010)
- "Lekkerbekkie" (2011)
- "Heidi" (2012)
- "Stoomtrein" (feat. Snotkop) (2012)
- "Kom bietjie hier" (2012)
- "Cowboys en crooks" (2014)
- "Dans op die Tafel (2014)
- "Ek wens vir jou" (2015)
- "Kaalvoet sokkie" (2016)
- "Jy's 'n Legend' (2017)
- "Selfie Song" (with Leah & Snotkop) (2017)

in Dutch

- "Voor Altijd" (2013)

in English

- "You"
- "Standing on the Edge"
- "Sunday"

As featured artist

- "Shame and Scandals" (Dr. Victor & the Rasta Rebels feat. Kurt Darren) (2012)

=== DVDs ===
- 2005: Op Toer
- 2008: Treffers Live
- 2008: Die Video's

== Filmography ==
- 2010: Liefling
- 2010: Susanna van Biljon
- 2010: The Race-ist
- 2011: Ek lief jou
- 2015: Stone Cold Jane Austen
- 2017: Van Der Merwe

== See also ==
- List of Afrikaans singers
