= Afro-soul =

Music genre

- Stylistic origins: Jazz; soul; african music; folk gospel; reggae
- Typical instruments: Drums; guitar; vocals; background vocals
- Derivative forms: Afro-pop

Local scenes
- South Africa; Kenya; Malawi; Botswana; Namibia Cameroon; France; Nigeria

Afro-soul is a genre of music that blends elements of soul music with African rhythms and instrumentation. It combines emotive vocal styles and lyrical themes characteristic of soul with traditional African musical elements, including indigenous rhythms, percussion instruments such as drums and shakers, and local languages or dialects.

While artists such as South African singer Miriam Makeba helped popularize soul-influenced African music in the 1950s and 1960s, the term "Afro-soul" has been more commonly used in later decades to describe a range of contemporary artists across Africa. The genre has since grown in popularity across the continent and internationally, often overlapping with styles like Afrobeat, neo-soul, and R&B.

== Notable musicians ==
- Brymo, Nigerian singer
- Miriam Makeba, a Grammy Award-winning South African singer and civil rights activist
- Zahara, South African singer
- Efya, Ghanaian singer
- Amanda Black, multi award-winning songstress from South Africa
- Simphiwe Dana, praised as "the best thing to happen to Afro-soul music since Miriam Makeba"
- Nathi Mankayi
- Libianca, Cameroonian-American singer
- Lira (singer)
- Muma Gee, Nigerian singer
- Scelo Gowane, South African singer
- Siphokazi, a South African artist
- Les Nubians, the French born sisters who are Afropean music singers
- The Budos Band
- K'naan
- Ginger Johnson
- Doug Kazé, Nigerian singer-songwriter
- Manu Dibango, from Cameroon
- Nomfusi, South African artist
- Lekan Babalola
- Grace Matata, Tanzanian singer
- Kumbie, Zimbabwean singer-songwriter
- Joe Nina, South Africa singer-Songwriter
- Jabulile Majola, South African singer-songwriter
