= Christgau's Record Guide: Rock Albums of the Seventies =

Music reference book

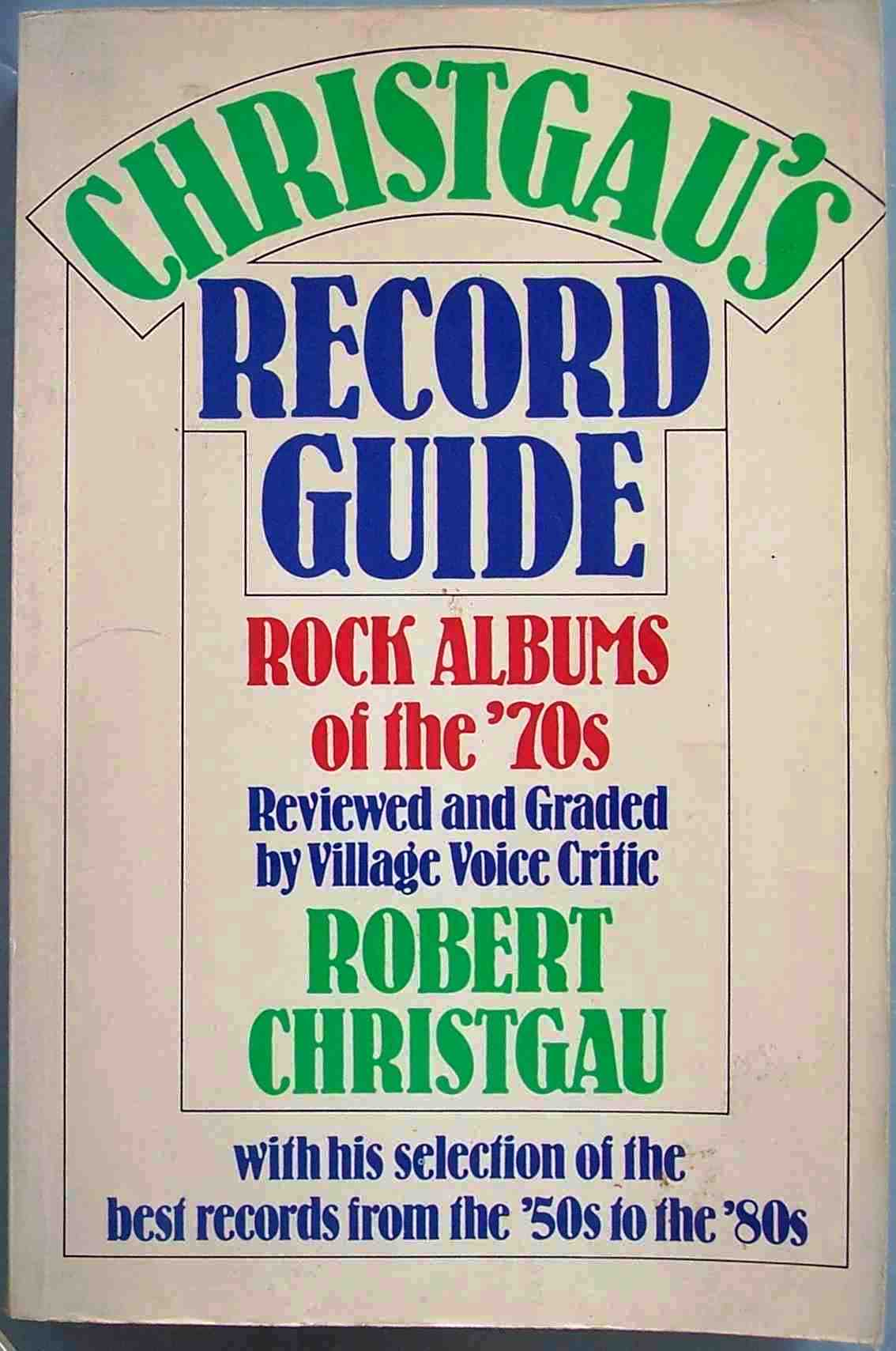
- Author: Robert Christgau
- Language: English
- Subject: Albums; capsule review; discography; music journalism; popular music; rock music
- Published: 1981 by Ticknor & Fields
- Publication place: United States
- Media type: Print
- Pages: 472
- ISBN: 0-89919-026-X
- Followed by: Christgau's Record Guide: The '80s

Christgau's Record Guide: Rock Albums of the Seventies is a music reference book by American music journalist and essayist Robert Christgau. It was first published in October 1981 by Ticknor & Fields. The book compiles approximately 3,000 of Christgau's capsule album reviews, most of which were originally written for his "Consumer Guide" column in The Village Voice throughout the 1970s. The entries feature annotated details about each record's release and cover a variety of genres related to rock music.

Christgau's reviews are informed by an interest in the aesthetic and political dimensions of popular music, a belief that it could be consumed intelligently, and a desire to communicate his ideas to readers in an entertaining, provocative, and compact way. Many of the older reviews were rewritten for the guide to reflect his changed perspective and matured stylistic approach. He undertook an intense preparation process for the book during 1979 and 1980, which temporarily hindered both his awareness of current music and his marriage to fellow writer Carola Dibbell, whom he later credited as an influence on his work.

The guide was critically well received, earning praise for its extensive discography, Christgau's judgment, and his colorful writing. Reviewers also noted his opinionated tastes, analytical commentary, pithy language, and critical quips. A staple of rock-era reference works, Christgau's Record Guide became widely popular in libraries as a source for popular music studies and as an authoritative guide for fellow critics, record collectors, and music shops, influencing the development of critical standards for evaluating music. It later appeared on several expert lists of the best popular music literature.

Christgau's Record Guide has been reprinted several times in book form and later on Christgau's website in its entirety. Two more "Consumer Guide" collections have been published, compiling his capsule reviews from the 1980s and the 1990s, respectively.

== Background ==
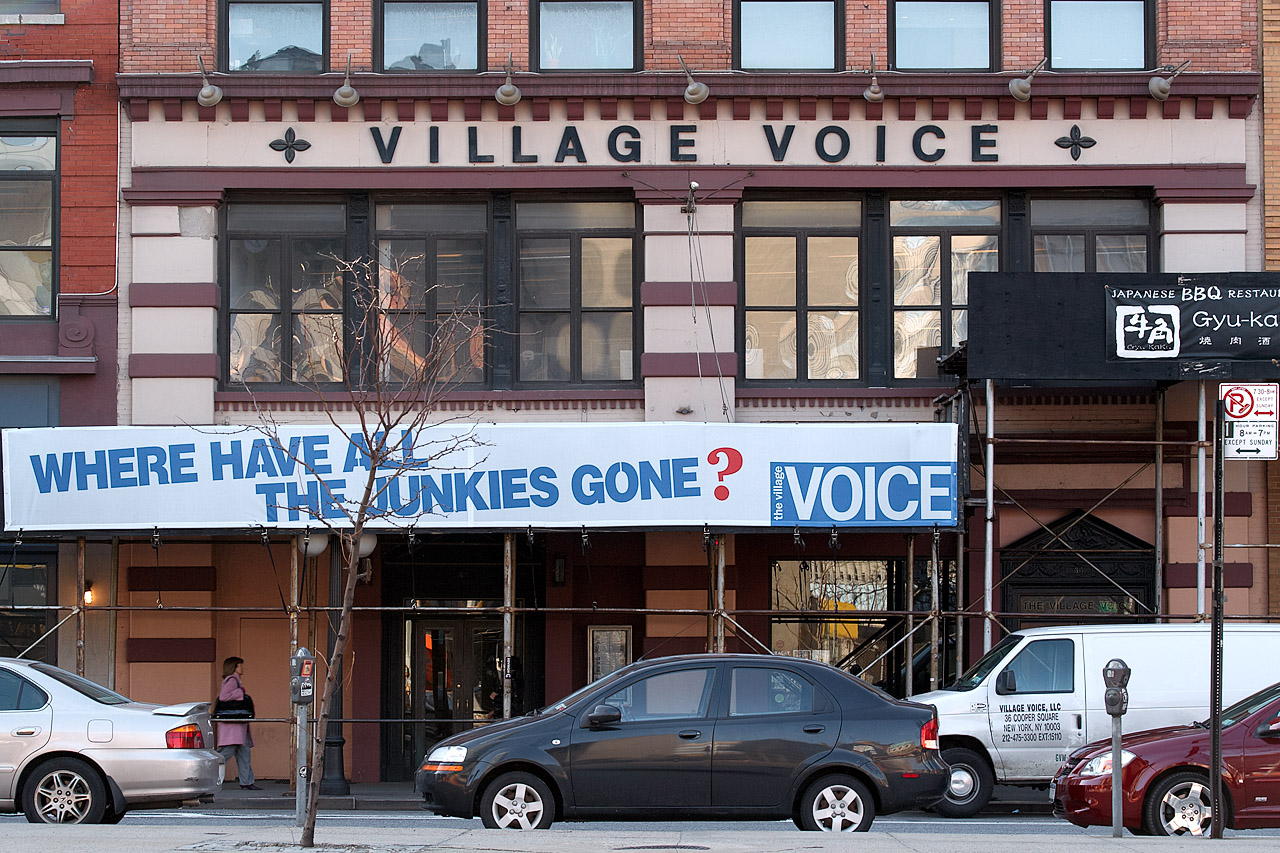
The guide originated from Robert Christgau's column in The Village Voice (former headquarters pictured in 2008).

In 1969, Robert Christgau began reviewing contemporary album releases in his "Consumer Guide" column, which was published more-or-less monthly in The Village Voice – an alternative weekly newspaper local to New York City – and for brief periods in Newsday and Creem magazine during the 1970s. His method was to select about 20 albums to review in capsule format, averaging approximately 50 words each, and to assign each album a letter grade rating on a scale from A-plus to E-minus. The column was a product of The Village Voice's deal with Christgau – allotting him one 2,500-word piece per month – and his desire to provide prospective buyers with ratings of albums, including those that did not receive significant radio airplay. Some of Christgau's early columns were reprinted in his first book, Any Old Way You Choose It, a 1973 anthology of essays previously published in the Voice and Newsday.

Among the most revered and influential of the early rock critics, Christgau wrote the "Consumer Guide" with a conviction that popular music could be consumed intelligently and discussed in a manner similar to books in literary criticism. His opinions and enthusiasm for music were informed by left-leaning politics, principles of humanism and secularism, and an interest in finding new understandings of the aesthetic and political dimensions in popular culture's intersection with the avant-garde. As a journalist, he wanted to convey his findings confidently and in a way that would entertain and provoke his readership. As such, his writing took on a densely compressed style featuring insulting language, slang, personal asides, and highbrow allusions meant to engage readers with an extensive knowledge of culture and music history, including popular music's canon and the metanarratives of specific musicians.

Over the course of the 1970s, Christgau broadened The Village Voice's readership nationally with his writing and editorial leadership, transforming the newspaper into a premier venue for popular music criticism at a time when the field began to peak in cultural influence. His own reputation developed as the field's leading American writer, with a cult following of the "Consumer Guide" column.

== Preparation ==
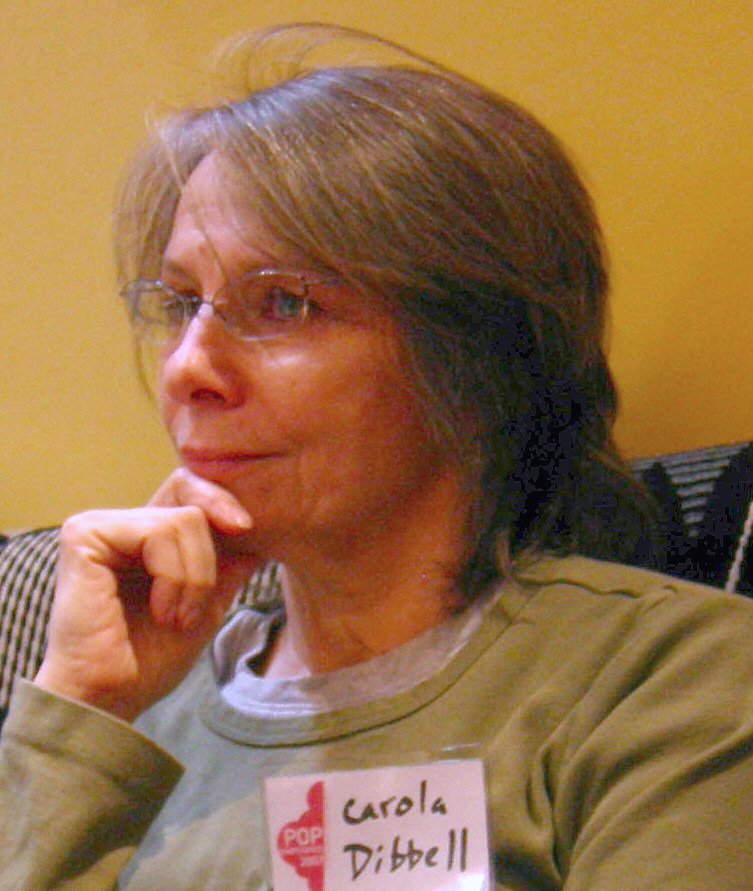
Christgau's intense work on the book temporarily strained his marriage to fellow writer Carola Dibbell (2007). He later dedicated the book to her.

In the late 1970s, Christgau conceived of a book that would collect reviews from his columns through that decade. He began to pitch Christgau's Record Guide to publishers in early 1979 and received a publishing deal shortly thereafter. He soon realized that the proposed book would not adequately represent the decade unless he significantly revised and expanded his existing columns. He believed his existing body of reviews overlooked important musical artists and would likely comprise less than two-thirds of the needed material for the book. In July of that year, he took a vacation from The Village Voice and left New York for Maine with his wife, fellow writer Carola Dibbell, to work on the book. They chartered a boathouse and brought with them a stereo system and numerous LP records. As Christgau recalled in his memoir Going Into the City (2015), "I had hundreds of records to find out about, hundreds to find, hundreds to re-review, hundreds to touch up."

Christgau continued working on the book after his return to New York. He was aided significantly by access to the record library of his neighbor, fellow journalist Vince Aletti, who owned all of James Brown's scarcely catalogued Polydor LPs from the 1970s. Beginning with Brown, Christgau re-examined the discographies of major artists in a chronological manner to curtail a sense of hindsight in the writing. "When possible", he said, "I piled on the changer artists I actually felt like hearing that day in a ploy intended to scare up the excited little feeling in the pit of my stomach without which I am loath to give any album an A." The work intensified in 1980; from the beginning of February to the end of July he spent every day preparing the book. Recounting in his memoir, he said he worked 14 hours daily while "in book mode", which "was so grueling that for most of 1980 I was barely aware of the music of the moment, the only such hiatus in what is now fifty years."

Christgau's intense immersion into preparing the book also put a strain on his marriage to Dibbell, as did their efforts to overcome infertility. In his words, the guide almost ruined his personal life: "We postponed further parenthood strategization. We hardly ever went out. The apartment sank to new depths of disarray as LPs and paper migrated into the dining room. And since I was home every minute with the stereo on, my life partner could never be alone, with herself or with her work." Dibbell's admission of an affair at the time led to a brief separation before she and Christgau reunited with a stronger commitment to each other, reflected in the book's dedication: "TO CAROLA – NEVER AGAIN." As they mended their relationship, Christgau slowed down his work pace in August 1980 while allowing Dibbell to "provide the tough edits I needed". In his memoir, he paid tribute to her influence on his work: "Her aesthetic responsiveness was unending ... no one affected my writing like Carola". Christgau finished the guide in mid-September, submitting the manuscript a few weeks past his publisher's deadline.

== Content and scope ==
I conceived the [Consumer Guide] as complementing my monthly essay. It was criticism with an immediate, undeniable practical function – criticism in a pop form, compact and digestible.

— Christgau's Record Guide, p. 4

Christgau's Record Guide collects approximately 3,000 "Consumer Guide" reviews of albums through the 1970s. The reviews are arranged alphabetically by artist name and accompanied by annotations for each record. Christgau regraded some older albums to reflect his changed perspective, while omitting other records and text from the original columns in favor of new material. Much of the material was previously unpublished, as more than half of the original reviews were expanded and extensively revised by Christgau for the guide, especially those covering the decade's first half. "Much of the early CG material was rewritten for the book for a reason", Christgau explained: "I didn't evolve my current high-density stylistic approach until 1975 or so". He wanted to retain parts of the original text as much as possible, "not just to poach language but to inject what sense of the moment I could".

The book covers albums from a variety of rock-related genres including hard rock, heavy metal, punk rock, funk, disco, soul, blues, country, and reggae. With regard to its scope, Christgau said he "tried to grade every '70s rock album worth owning" and what he called "semipopular" music, while maintaining a perspective of being "equal" with rock listeners. (Note: Christgau coined the term "semipopular music" in 1970, to describe records that seemed accessible for popular consumption but proved unsuccessful commercially. "I recognized that something else was going on – the distribution system appeared to be faltering, FM and all", he later wrote in Christgau's Record Guide (1981), explaining that records like The Velvet Underground and The Gilded Palace of Sin (by Flying Burrito Brothers) possessed populist qualities yet failed to impact the record charts. "Just as semiclassical music is a systematic dilution of highbrow preferences, semipopular music is a cross-bred concentration of fashionable modes." In his mind, a liking "for the nasty, brutish, and short intensifies a common semipopular tendency in which lyrical and conceptual sophistication are applauded while musical sophistication – jazz chops or classical design or avant-garde innovation – is left to the specialists.") The reviews often feature analytical commentary on the aesthetic or cultural significance of the music, as well as critical one-liner jokes. For example, his review of the Leonard Cohen album Live Songs (1973) states Cohen "risks turning into the Pete Seeger of romantic existentialism", while the Doobie Brothers' Takin' It to the Streets (1976) is panned in a single sentence: "You can lead a Doobie to the recording studio, but you can't make him think."

The book is appended with introductory essays by Christgau, including a historical overview of rock and an explanation of his grading system; an A-plus record is defined as "an organically conceived masterpiece that repays prolonged listening", while "E records are frequently cited as proof that there is no God." Other unworthy music of note is relegated to two pages of lists toward the end of the guide, titled "Who Cares?" and "Meltdown". The last section of the book, titled "A Basic Record Library", lists the albums he regarded as the essential records of the 1950s, 1960s, and 1970s, respectively.

== Publication history ==
Christgau's Record Guide: Rock Albums of the Seventies was first published in October 1981 by Ticknor & Fields (an imprint of Houghton Mifflin) in New Haven, Connecticut. It was released at a time when bookstores saw an influx of rock music reference books as publishers competed with one another for the market. The book was published in the United Kingdom the following year through the London-based Vermilion imprint, and was reprinted in 1985 by Houghton Mifflin in New York.

In 1990, Christgau's Record Guide was reprinted by Da Capo Press under the title Rock Albums of the Seventies: A Critical Guide. In the reprint's introduction, Christgau said he had revised some of the content. It was followed by Christgau's Record Guide: The '80s that same year and Christgau's Consumer Guide: Albums of the '90s in 2000, forming a three-volume series of books compiling the capsule reviews. The contents of all three "Consumer Guide" collections were made freely available on Christgau's website when it went online in 2001 with the help of fellow critic and web designer Tom Hull.

== Reception ==
=== Popular press ===
Christgau's Record Guide was well received in the popular music press during the 1980s. Reviewing the book in 1982 for The New York Times, Robert Palmer found it notable among the recent slew of rock reference publications "because it is both obsessively complete and caustically outspoken". He identified qualities of maturity, intelligence, and humor in Christgau's music criticism, and recommended the book as a valuable resource for those with a serious interest in contemporary rock, even if some of the opinions may prove divisive. "It is a bit too cantankerously opinionated to deserve an A-plus," Palmer wrote, "but it certainly repays reading and rereading." Liam Lacey of The Globe and Mail called the guide "archly entertaining", while a reviewer for The Washington Post said Christgau "writes beautifully, and his book is a provocative capsule history of '70s pop". In The Harvard Crimson, David M. Handelman gave the guide an "A" grade and deemed Christgau "everything a rock critic should be" and without the pretensions of contemporaries like John Rockwell, Kit Rachlis, and Dave Marsh: "There's non [sic] of the tortured delving into non existent souls. He trashes trash, and embraces fun, genius, and things between." Handelman also supported his brevity of style and the capsule-style format, arguing that anything longer is often unreasonable for a review of an album; "how many people read beyond the good/bad label?", he questioned. Herb Hendler named Christgau's Record Guide among the books and magazines "relevant to youth and the rock era" in Year by Year in the Rock Era (1983), a chronicle of rock music's cultural impact from 1954 to 1982. In The Boston Phoenix, Mark Moses found Christgau's critiques to be "funny, accurate, and revelatory." While noting that "Anyone can be enriched by this book, and anyone can be enervated by it," Moses still rated it "A Minus."

Steve Simels, who had been inspired to pursue a journalistic career by Christgau's early 1970s writing, ended up reviewing the book for Stereo Review and offered qualified praise. He regarded Christgau's reviews as indisputably well-written with fair-minded critical judgment, impressive witticisms and one-liners, and a deeper interest in black music than most other white critics. But Simels expressed reservations about what he perceived to be a mawkish sense of feminist conscience, "knee-jerk" liberal politics, and a predilection for "conceptual music", exemplified by "A" grades for all four Ramones albums. After laboring through the entire guide, he found himself "surprised to discover how even-handed [Christgau]'s been over the long haul", and wrote in sum that it is worth reading, even if not entirely reliable. In High Fidelity, David Browne said some of Christgau's musings would be too complicated for newcomers to rock journalism, but concluded that "he remains one of pop's most astute critics" and the guide functions best as a way of discovering good records – such as Bill Withers's Still Bill (1972) – otherwise obscured by the complex discography of 1970s popular music.

Some reviewers were more critical of the book. Marsh, who had cited the "Consumer Guide" concept as an influence on his contemporaneous Rolling Stone Record Guide, gave the collection a B-plus in Musician. He found Christgau "concise, contentious, condescending, provocative and pedagogic" with a shrewd sense of judgment and sharp insight, but complained of gratuitous, off-topic commentary and possible attempts to keep up with fashionable consensus, as there were no clear indications which reviews had been rewritten in retrospect for the book. Marsh ultimately questioned whether Christgau's tough-mindedness and ideological rigidity made him ideal for a guide book and asked what it means if "the most influential rock critic has never written a book that wasn't an anthology". A response by Christgau was published in the magazine a few months later, in which he expressed appreciation for Marsh's "kind words" about the book and referred back to its introductory essay to answer questions posed in the review:

Though I don't indicate which reviews are newly written, I do state that I've reconsidered every record I had doubts about and stand by every judgment. As the co-editor of a competing consumer guide, Dave knows that the most important thing to do when you're reviewing records is to listen to them first.

British music scholar Paul Taylor issued different complaints about the book in his 1985 guide to literature on popular music, Popular Music Since 1955. He called Christgau's Record Guide "an odd collection" for several reasons. "Included are certainly the best albums", he observed, "but it is the way in which the bad examples are selected that is dubious, and simply mediocre records are avoided."

=== Academic journals ===
Christgau's reviews are evaluative in a way that few rock and roll record guides have been. He not only describes his personal likes and dislikes, but he evaluates style, influence, quality of lyrics, and musicianship as well as recording quality. He preserves all the evaluative quality of classical music record reviews while at the same time using to advantage the informal, colorful, and humorous side of the rock and roll industry.

— Choice: Current Reviews for Academic Libraries (1982)

Beyond the popular press, the book also garnered positive notice among academic journals focusing on reference works and curation of library collections. A review in Choice magazine highly recommended the guide, arguing that it functions superbly as a read for spontaneous pleasure and a reference to rock's "major and minor classics" while highlighting the last section for librarians assembling a rock record collection. Illinois Libraries, the journal publication of the Illinois Library Association, advised AV librarians to consult the guide for help in selecting music recordings to archive. The journal's reviewer called Christgau "a senior critic if rock music has such a thing" and suggested readers focus less on his dislikes of artists like John Denver and more on his "well-founded and meaningful" enthusiasm for Terry Garthwaite, Brian Eno, and the Ramones.

Lee Ash, general editor of the Haworth Press's Special Collections journal, reviewed Christgau's Record Guide as among books recommended to library special collections. The guide's "quality, content, scope, and evaluative notes" impressed Ash, who had a greater familiarity with discographies of early chamber music and only a mild enthusiasm for rock music. He concluded it is an essential guide for music collection and providing "critical material for argument". In Library Journal, P. G. Feehan regarded Christgau as a rigorous, smart critic and the book an excellent companion to The Rolling Stone Record Guide, particularly because of his extensive coverage of albums from fringe and import record labels. Feehan's one cavil was "his four-letter-word-studded, hip/smart style, which may turn off readers from west of the Hudson River".

== Legacy and influence ==
Christgau's Record Guide and similar review collections played a role in the rise of rock critics as tastemakers, promoters, and cultural historians in the music industry, whose standards were being reinvented by rock music. These critics constructed their own versions of what popular music academic Roy Shuker called "the traditional high-low culture split, usually around notions of artistic integrity, authenticity, and the nature of commercialism". As with The Rolling Stone Record Guide, Christgau's Record Guide became popular with music aficionados, collectors, and both secondhand and specialty record stores, who kept copies of different volumes on hand. Christgau's guides to the 1970s and 1980s were "bibles in the field", as Shuker described, "establishing orthodoxies as to the relative value of various styles or genres and pantheons of artists". While reviewing the 1980s volume for the Chicago Tribune in 1990, Greg Kot said Christgau's Record Guide and Ira Robbins's Trouser Press Record Guide had been "the bibles of my existence as a rock critic". Fellow critic Rob Sheffield named it among his six favorite books in a list published by The Week, believing other "obsessive music freaks" likely own it too. "This book is the all-time rock-'n'-roll argument starter", he said, "and I'll be arguing with it for the rest of my life." It was also read by novelists Dylan Hicks and Jonathan Lethem when they were young adults; Lethem later revealed that "for years, I calibrated my record collection against the grades ... jotting dissenting views in pencil in the margins". In retrospect, Christgau said the book "greatly enhance[d] my personal profile as well as reaching readers I'm proud are still out there."

The guide was published in an era when popular music studies were the domain of non-academic sources such as journalists rather than music departments and classical academics. It became widely popular in library catalogues by the late 1980s, along with other anthologized works of rock journalism by critics like Ellen Willis and Lester Bangs. The "Consumer Guide" reviews collected in the book were cited by Weisbard as part of rock and popular music's reinvention of critical standards. The end of the 20th century saw another paradigm shift, as paid journalism declined and academic departments gradually embraced popular music studies. In 1997, the Music Library Association used both 1970s and 1980s volumes as references to prepare select rock recordings for A Basic Music Library: Essential Scores and Sound Recordings, published by the American Library Association as a guide for librarians and other specialist collectors.

Christgau believed the 1970s guide was the most "authoritative" in the "Consumer Guide" book series because the decade's smaller music market was easier to process. He characterized the first volume as "a kind of canon-defining work, making the case for Van Morrison and, say, the McGarrigle sisters, and against Black Sabbath and, say, Donny Hathaway." In comparison to The Rolling Stone Record Guide, Christgau said "I think mine is better, but that's not worth arguing. What's undeniable is that mine was written by one person, and was therefore an act of sensibility rather than cultural fiat, with no canonizing intention albeit some canonizing effect (which was soon nullified by the Rock and Roll Hall of Fame [in 1983], a status grab far more effective than any book)." In the two decades that followed, he felt the canon grew "far murkier, vaster, and more various", while his personal taste became more idiosyncratic and divergent from general critical consensus. According to The Boston Globe's Ivan Kreilkamp, the "audacious, canon-defining work" remained the critic's most impactful work. In Eric Weisbard's opinion, Christgau "wasn't so much canonizing as using the endless listening party to find new wrinkles in his, and popular music's, unsummarizable aesthetic".

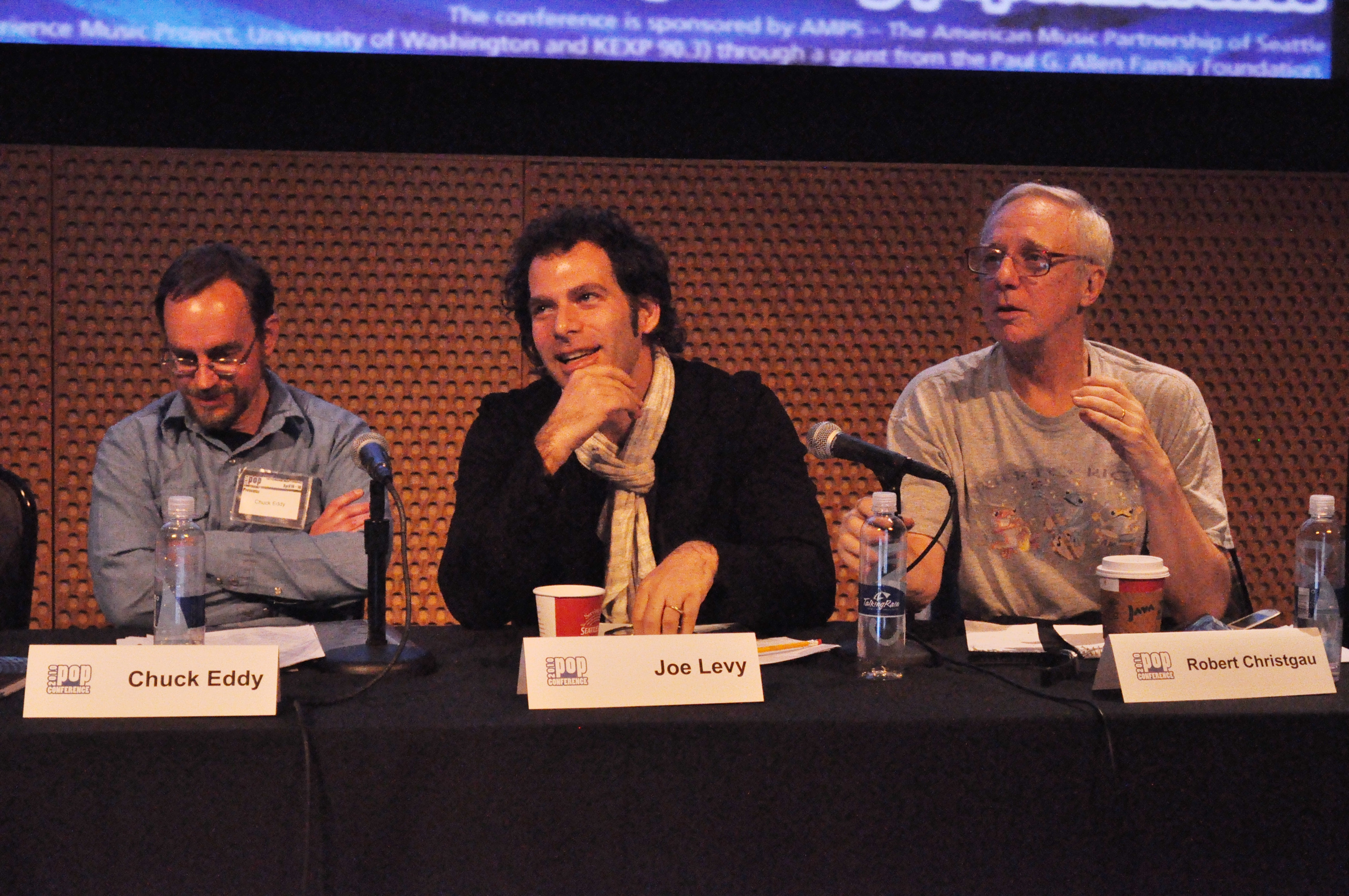
Christgau (right) and Chuck Eddy (left) – one of several critics who have recommended the book – in 2010 at the Museum of Pop Culture's Pop Conference

Christgau's Record Guide has been regarded as "essential rock writing" by literary academic Cornel Bonca. Chuck Eddy included it in his buying guide to books on rock music, while Jon Savage recommended it as a useful discography of 1970s punk rock. In 2006, all three "Consumer Guide" books were collectively ranked fifth on The A.V. Club's list of the 17 essential books about popular music; in the opinion of the list's writers, Christgau "made a sublime art of the capsule review, packing pithy observations and heartfelt appreciation into 150-word boxes". Michaelangelo Matos, a staff writer for the website, was greatly influenced by Christgau and said the first two volumes were books he had read most frequently as an adult. He highlighted Christgau's humor, ability to extract the essence of an album in a few sentences, and punctuating of reviews with letter grades, "a cunning rhetorical device as much as simple judgment". In 2016, Billboard placed the first volume at number 47 on a list of the 100 greatest music books; an accompanying blurb read: "His '70s collection offers a fantastic primer on rock and soul's most fruitful decade. Whether or not you share Christgau's passion for Al Green's 'Let's Get Married' or his disdain for all things Eagles, you'll love his pith and wit."

== See also ==
- 1970s in music
- Album era
- Classic rock
- Music criticism
- Music journalism
- Rockism and poptimism
- Spin Alternative Record Guide

== Bibliography ==
- Anon.[a] (October 18, 1981). "Pop Music Rock Record, by Terry Hounsome and Tim Chambre and Christgau's Record Guide: Rock Albums of the '70s, by Robert Christgau". The Washington Post.
- Anon.[b] (December 1981). "New and Forthcoming Publications". CUM Notis Variorum (58).
- Anon. (June 1982). "When Only a Balanced Selection of Reviews Will Do ...". Choice: Current Reviews for Academic Libraries. 19.
- Anon. (1983). "Cavemen's Club". Illinois Libraries. 65 (6–10).
- Anon. (1991). "Subject Index". Paperbound Books in Print. 5–6 (Fall 1991 ed.).
- Applegate, Edd (1996). Literary Journalism: A Biographical Dictionary of Writers and Editors. Greenwood Publishing Group. ISBN 978-0-313-29949-0.
- Ash, Lee (1985). "Books of Interest to Special Collections of All Kinds". Special Collections. 2 (4) (Summer 1985 ed.).
- Cartwright, Garth (May 11, 2001). "A Life in Writing: Robert Christgau". The Guardian. Archived from the original on September 18, 2018.
- Bonca, Cornel (2014). Paul Simon: An American Tune. Rowman & Littlefield. ISBN 978-0-8108-8482-3.
- Browne, David (March 1988). "You Can Look It Up!". High Fidelity. Vol. 38, no. 3.
- Christgau, Robert (1981). Christgau's Record Guide: Rock Albums of the Seventies. Ticknor & Fields. ISBN 0-89919-026-X.
- Christgau, Robert (March 1982). "Christgau Reconsidered". Musician. No. 41.
- Christgau, Robert (2002). "Answers from the Dean: Online Exchange with Robert Christgau". RockCritics.com. Archived from the original on December 30, 2018 – via RockCriticsArchives.com.
- Christgau, Robert (2002). "Answers from the Dean: Online Exchange with Robert Christgau, part II". RockCritics.com. Archived from the original on April 1, 2012 – via RockCriticsArchives.com.
- Christgau, Robert (2015). Going into the City: Portrait of a Critic as a Young Man. HarperCollins. ISBN 978-0-06-223879-5.
- Christgau, Robert (June 23, 2019). "Robert Christgau on Twitter". Twitter.
- Davis, Elizabeth A.; Bristah, Pamela; Gottlieb, Jane; Underwood, Kent David; Anderson, William E., eds. (1997). A Basic Music Library: Essential Scores and Sound Recordings. American Library Association. ISBN 978-0-8389-3461-6.
- Dibbell, Carola (June 23, 2019). "Carola Dibbell on Twitter". Twitter.
- DiGiacomo, Frank; Edwards, Gavin; Farber, Jim; Goodman, Lizzy; Hinckley, David; Johnson, Maura; Lynskey, Dorian; Milzoff, Rebecca; Rosen, Jody; Santoro, Gene; Tannenbaum, Rob (September 16, 2016). "100 Greatest Music Books of All Time". Billboard. Archived from the original on August 21, 2018.
- Eddy, Chuck (1997). The Accidental Evolution of Rock'n'roll: A Misguided Tour Through Popular Music. Perseus Books Group. ISBN 978-0-306-80741-1.
- Feehan, P. G. (1981). "Christgau's Record Guide". Library Journal. 1061 (1).
- Gross, Jason (June 2015). "The Dean of Rock Critics Schools Us on Himself: Robert Christgau's Going Into the City (Dey St.)". Rock's Backpages. (subscription required)
- Handelman, David M. (November 12, 1981). "A Grade A Record Guide". The Harvard Crimson.
- Hendler, Herb (1983). Year by Year in the Rock Era: Events and Conditions Shaping the Rock Generations that Reshaped America. Greenwood Press. ISBN 978-0-313-23456-9.
- Hicks, Dylan (October 27, 2017). "A minus review from Robert Christgau". Hicksy's Infrequently Updated Blog. Archived from the original on May 11, 2021.
- Inge, M. Thomas; Hall, Dennis, eds. (2002). The Greenwood Guide to American Popular Culture. Vol. 4. Greenwood Press. ISBN 978-0-313-30878-9.
- Kreilkamp, Ivan (December 29, 2002). "Rock and Roll Report Card: Critic Robert Christgau Turns the Capsule Review into an Art Form". The Boston Globe.
- Kot, Greg (November 15, 1990). "Elder Statesman". Chicago Tribune. Archived from the original on July 10, 2019.
- Lacey, Liam (November 12, 1981). "Riff Rapp: Blondie's into video but Queen opts out". The Globe and Mail.
- Lethem, Jonathan (February 28, 2005). "The Art of Mourning". The New Yorker.
- Locher, Frances C.; Evory, Ann, eds. (1977). Contemporary Authors. Gale. ISBN 978-0-8103-0029-3.
- Manzler, Scott (October 31, 2000). "Christgau's Consumer Guide to Albums of the '90s". No Depression. No. 30.
- Marsh, Dave; Swenson, John, eds. (1979). The Rolling Stone Record Guide. Random House. ISBN 978-0-394-73535-1.
- Marsh, Dave (November 1981). "1981 Consumer Guide to Rock Books". Musician. No. 37.
- Matos, Michaelangelo; et al. (A.V. Club Staff) (June 10, 2011). "Most Re-Read Books". The A.V. Club. Archived from the original on July 1, 2019.
- Moses, Mark (November 3, 1981). "Making book on rock 'n' roll: The Dean's list". The Boston Phoenix.
- Murray, Noel; Phipps, Keith; Ryan, Kyle; Modell, Josh (October 6, 2006). "Inventory: 17 Essential Books About Popular Music". The A.V. Club. Archived from the original on August 21, 2018.
- Palmer, Robert (April 14, 1982). "Christgau's Record Guide". The New York Times. Archived from the original on August 21, 2018.
- Robins, Wayne (2016). A Brief History of Rock, Off the Record. Routledge. ISBN 978-1-135-92346-4.
- Rosen, Jody (September 5, 2006). "X-ed Out". Slate.
- Salzman, Jack (1986). American Studies: An Annotated Bibliography, Volume II. Cambridge University Press. ISBN 978-0-521-26687-1.
- Savage, Jon (2002). England's Dreaming, Revised Edition: Anarchy, Sex Pistols, Punk Rock, and Beyond. Macmillan Publishers. ISBN 978-0-312-28822-8.
- Sheffield, Rob (August 13, 2010). "Rob Sheffield's 6 favorite books". The Week. Archived from the original on September 25, 2019.
- Shepherd, John; Horn, David; Laing, Dave; Oliver, Paul; Wicke, Peter, eds. (2003). Continuum Encyclopedia of Popular Music of the World Volume I: Media, Industry and Society. A&C Black. ISBN 978-1-84714-473-7.
- Shuker, Roy (1994). Understanding Popular Music. Psychology Press. ISBN 978-0-415-10722-8.
- Simels, Steve (January 1982). "Popular Music". Stereo Review. Vol. 47.
- Smith, George (October 21, 1990). "Tune in to Pop Music With a Few Good Books". The Morning Call.
- Super, John C.; Irons-Georges, Tracy, eds. (2006). The Seventies in America. Vol. 2. Salem Press. ISBN 978-1-58765-230-1.
- Taylor, Paul (1985). Popular Music Since 1955: A Critical Guide to the Literature. Mansell Publishing Limited. ISBN 978-0-7201-1727-1.
- Weisbard, Eric (March–June 2018). "Old Books for New Ceremonies". Journal of Popular Music Studies. 30 (1–2): 27–44. doi:10.1525/jpms.2018.000018. Archived from the original on December 10, 2018.
- Wolk, Douglas (July 9, 2010). "Music's Time Capsules: 41 Years of Christgau's 'Consumer Guide'". Vulture. Archived from the original on September 27, 2018.
- Wynar, Bohdan S.; Littlefield, Janet H.; Holte, Susan C., eds. (1982). American Reference Books Annual, 1982. Vol. 13. Libraries Unlimited. ISBN 978-0-87287-287-5.
