= Robert Christgau =

American music journalist (born 1942)

- Christgau in 2026
- Born: Robert Thomas Christgau; April 18, 1942 (age 84); New York City, U.S.
- Education: Dartmouth College (BA)
- Occupations: Music critic; essayist; journalist
- Spouse: Carola Dibbell (m. 1974)
- Children: 1
- Writing career
- Period: 1967–present
- Website: robertchristgau.com

Robert Thomas Christgau (/ˈkrɪstɡaʊ/ KRIST-gow; born April 18, 1942) is an American music journalist and essayist. Among the most influential music critics, he began his career in the late 1960s as one of the earliest professional rock critics and later became an early proponent of musical movements such as hip-hop, riot grrrl, and the import of African popular music in the West. He was the chief music critic and senior editor for The Village Voice for 37 years, during which time he created and oversaw the annual Pazz & Jop critics poll. He has also covered popular music for Esquire, Creem, Newsday, Playboy, Rolling Stone, Billboard, NPR, Blender, and MSN Music; he was a visiting arts teacher at New York University. CNN senior writer Jamie Allen has called Christgau "the E. F. Hutton of the music world—when he talks, people listen."

Christgau is best known for his terse, letter-graded capsule album reviews, composed in a concentrated, fragmented prose style featuring layered clauses, caustic wit, one-liner jokes, political digressions, and allusions ranging from common knowledge to the esoteric. His writing is often informed by leftist politics (particularly feminism and secular humanism). He has generally favored song-oriented musical forms and qualities of wit and formal rigor, as well as musicianship from uncommon sources.

Originally published in his "Consumer Guide" columns during his tenure at The Village Voice from 1969 to 2006, the reviews were collected in book form across three decade-ending volumes: Christgau's Record Guide: Rock Albums of the Seventies (1981), Christgau's Record Guide: The '80s (1990), and Christgau's Consumer Guide: Albums of the '90s (2000). Multiple collections of his essays have been published in book form, and a website published in his name since 2001 has freely hosted most of his work.

In 2006, the Voice fired Christgau after the paper's acquisition by New Times Media. He continued to write reviews in the "Consumer Guide" format for MSN Music, Cuepoint, and Noisey (Vice's music section) where they were published in his "Expert Witness" column until July 2019. In September of the same year, he launched a paid-subscription newsletter called And It Don't Stop, published on the email-newsletter platform Substack and featuring a monthly "Consumer Guide" column, among other writings.

== Early life ==
Christgau was born in Greenwich Village in Manhattan, New York City, on April 18, 1942. He grew up in Queens, the son of a fireman. He has said he became a rock and roll fan when disc jockey Alan Freed moved to the city in 1954.

After attending public school in the city, Christgau attended Dartmouth College, graduating in 1962 with a B.A. degree in English. At college, his musical interests turned to jazz, but he quickly returned to rock after moving back to New York. He has said that Miles Davis's 1960 album Sketches of Spain initiated "one phase of the disillusionment (in him) with jazz that resulted in my return to rock and roll." He was deeply influenced by New Journalism writers including Gay Talese and Tom Wolfe. "My ambitions when I went into journalism were always, to an extent, literary," Christgau said later.

== Career ==
Christgau wrote short stories, before giving up fiction in 1964 to become a sportswriter and later, a police reporter for the Newark Star-Ledger. He became a freelance writer after a story he wrote about the death of a woman in New Jersey was published by New York magazine. He was among the first dedicated rock critics. He was asked to take over the dormant music column at Esquire, which he began writing in June 1967. He also contributed to Cheetah magazine at the time. He then became a leading voice in the formation of a musical–political aesthetic combining New Left politics and the counterculture. After Esquire discontinued the column, Christgau moved to The Village Voice in 1969, and he also worked as a college professor.

From early on in his emergence as a critic, Christgau was conscious of his lack of formal knowledge of music. In a 1968 piece he commented:

I don't know anything about music, which ought to be a damaging admission but isn't. ... The fact is that pop writers in general shy away from such arcana as key signature and beats to the measure. ... I used to confide my worries about this to friends in the record industry, who reassured me. They didn't know anything about music either. The technical stuff didn't matter, I was told. You just gotta dig it.

In early 1972, Christgau accepted a full-time job as music critic for Newsday. He returned to The Village Voice in 1974 as music editor. In a 1976 piece for the newspaper, he coined the term "Rock Critic Establishment" to describe the growth in influence of American music critics. His article carried the parenthesized subtitle "But Is That Bad for Rock?" He listed Dave Marsh, John Rockwell, Paul Nelson, Jon Landau and himself as members of this "establishment". Christgau remained at The Village Voice until August 2006, when he was fired shortly after the paper's acquisition by New Times Media. Two months later, Christgau became a contributing editor at Rolling Stone (which first published his review of Moby Grape's Wow in 1968). Late in 2007, Christgau was dismissed by Rolling Stone, although he continued to work for the magazine for another three months. Beginning with the March 2008 issue, he joined Blender, where he was listed as "senior critic" for three issues and then "contributing editor". Christgau had been a regular contributor to Blender before he joined Rolling Stone. He continued to write for Blender until the magazine ceased publication in March 2009. In 1987, he was awarded a Guggenheim Fellowship in the field of "folklore and popular culture" to study the history of popular music.

Christgau has also written frequently for Playboy, Spin, and Creem. He appears in the 2011 rockumentary Color Me Obsessed, about the Replacements. He previously taught during the formative years of the California Institute of the Arts. As of 2007, he was an adjunct professor in the Clive Davis Department of Recorded Music at New York University.

In August 2013, Christgau revealed in an article written for Barnes & Noble's website that he was writing a memoir. On July 15, 2014, Christgau debuted a monthly column on Billboard's website.

=== "Consumer Guide" and "Expert Witness" columns ===
Christgau is perhaps best known for his "Consumer Guide" columns, which have been published more-or-less monthly since July 10, 1969, in the Village Voice, as well as a brief period in Creem. In its original format, each edition of the "Consumer Guide" consisted of approximately 20 single-paragraph album reviews, each given a letter grade ranging from A+ to E−. The reviews were later collected, expanded, and extensively revised in a three-volume book series, the first of which was published in 1981 as Christgau's Record Guide: Rock Albums of the Seventies; it was followed by Christgau's Record Guide: The '80s (1990) and Christgau's Consumer Guide: Albums of the '90s (2000).

In his original grading system from 1969 to 1990, albums were given a grade ranging from A+ to E−. Under this system, Christgau generally considered a B+ or higher to be a personal recommendation. He noted that in practice, grades below a C− were rare. In 1990, Christgau changed the format of the "Consumer Guide" to focus more on the albums he liked. B+ records that Christgau deemed "unworthy of a full review" were mostly given brief comments and star marks ranging from three down to one, denoting an honorable mention", records which Christgau believed may be of interest to their own target audience. Lesser albums were filed under categories such as "Neither" (which may impress at first with "coherent craft or an arresting track or two", before failing to make an impression again) and "Duds" (which indicated bad records and were listed without further comment). Christgau did give full reviews and traditional grades to records he pans in an annual November "Turkey Shoot" column in The Village Voice, until he left the newspaper in 2006.

In 2001, robertchristgau.com—an online archive of Christgau's "Consumer Guide" reviews and other writings from his career—was set up as a co-operative project between Christgau and longtime friend Tom Hull; the two had met in 1975 shortly after Hull queried Christgau as The Village Voice's regional editor for St. Louis. The website was created after the September 11, 2001, attacks when Hull was stuck in New York while visiting from his native Wichita. While Christgau spent many nights preparing past Village Voice writings for the website, by 2002 much of the older "Consumer Guide" columns had been inputted by Hull and a small coterie of fans. According to Christgau, Hull is "a computer genius as well as an excellent and very knowledgeable music critic, but he'd never done much web site work. The design of the web site, especially its high searchability and small interest in graphics, are his idea of what a useful music site should be".

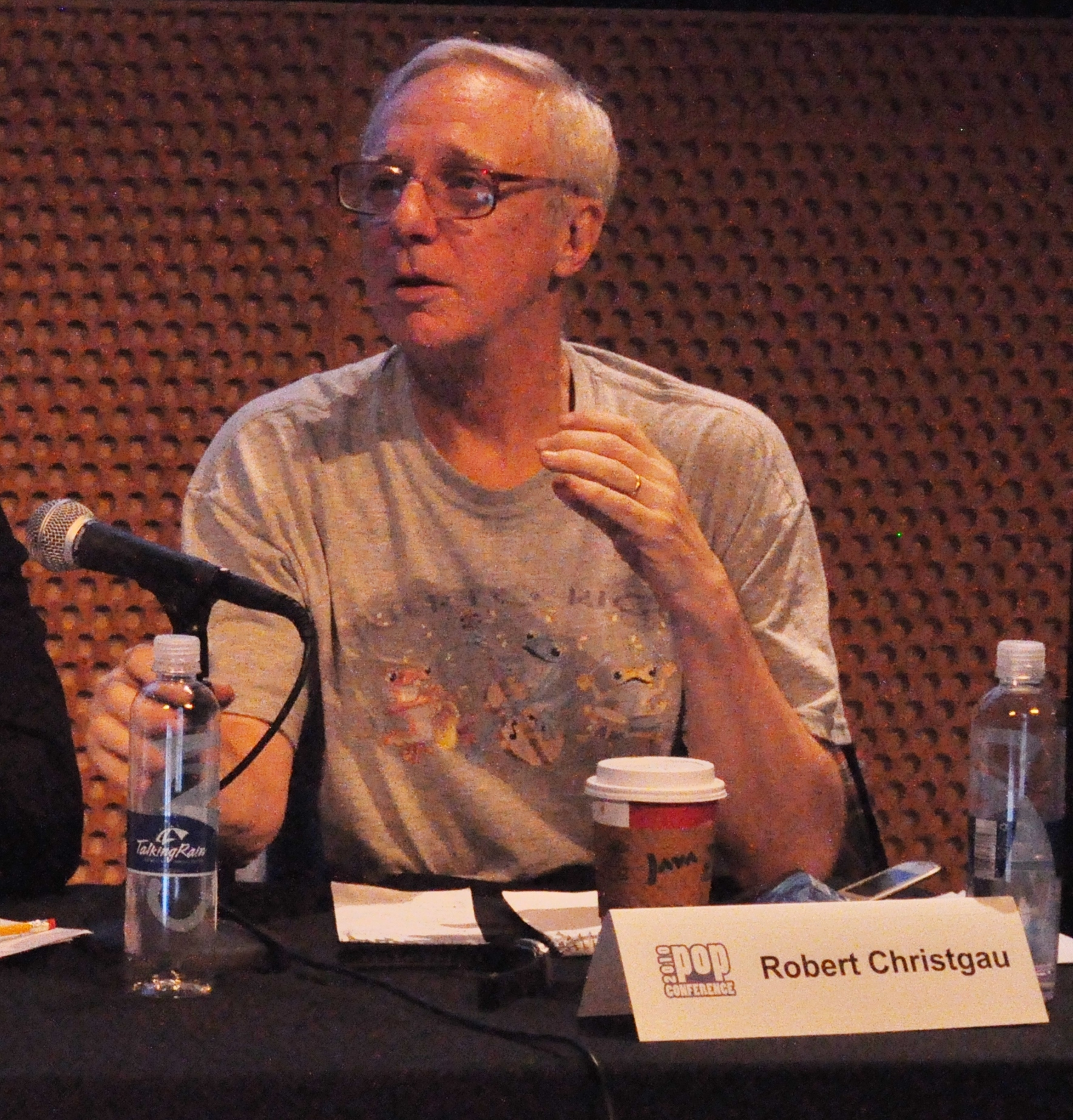
Christgau on the "Music in the '00s" panel at the 2010 Pop Conference in Seattle.

In December 2006, Christgau began writing his "Consumer Guide" columns for MSN Music, initially appearing every other month, before switching to a monthly schedule in June 2007. On July 1, 2010, he announced in the introduction to his "Consumer Guide" column that the July 2010 installment would be the last on MSN. On November 22, he launched a blog on MSN, called "Expert Witness", which featured reviews only of albums that he had graded B+ or higher, since those albums "are the gut and backbone of my musical pleasure"; the writing of reviews for which are "so rewarding psychologically that I'm happy to do it at blogger's rates". He began corresponding with dedicated readers of the column, named as "The Witnesses" after the column. On September 20, 2013, Christgau announced in the comments section that "Expert Witness" would cease to be published by October 1, 2013, writing, "As I understand it, Microsoft is shutting down the entire MSN freelance arts operation at that time ..."

On September 10, 2014, Christgau debuted a new version of "Expert Witness" on Cuepoint, an online music magazine published on the blogging platform Medium. In August 2015, he was hired by Vice to write the column for the magazine's music section, Noisey. In July 2019, the final edition of "Expert Witness" was published.

In September 2019, at the encouragement of friend and colleague Joe Levy, Christgau began publishing the newsletter "And It Don't Stop" on the newsletter-subscription platform Substack. Charging subscribers $5 per month, it has his monthly "Consumer Guide" column, podcasts, and free weekly content like book reviews. He was skeptical of the platform at first: "Basically I told Joe that if I didn't have enough subscribers to pay what I made at Noisey by Christmas I was going to quit. I wasn't going to do it for less than that money. I had that many subscribers inside of three days." By May 2020, "And It Don't Stop" had more than 1,000 subscribers. Christgau was ambivalent about the platform at first, but has since found it "immensely gratifying" explaining that, "A man my age, who is still really intellectually active? It is tremendously flattering and gratifying that there are people who are ready to help support me."

=== Pazz & Jop ===
Between 1968 and 1970, Christgau submitted ballots in Jazz & Pop magazine's annual critics' poll. He selected Bob Dylan's John Wesley Harding (released late in 1967), The Who's Tommy (1969), and Randy Newman's 12 Songs (1970) as the best pop albums of their respective years, and Miles Davis's Bitches Brew (1970) as the best jazz album of its year. Jazz & Pop discontinued publication in 1971.

In 1971, Christgau inaugurated the annual Pazz & Jop music poll, named in tribute to Jazz & Pop. The poll surveyed music critics on their favorite releases of the year. The poll results were published in the Village Voice every February after compiling "top ten" lists submitted by music critics across the nation. Throughout his career at the Voice, every poll was accompanied by a lengthy Christgau essay analyzing the results and pondering the year's overall musical output. The Voice continued the feature after Christgau's dismissal. Although he no longer oversaw the poll, Christgau continued to vote and, since the 2015 poll, also contributed essays to the results.

==== "Dean's Lists" ====
Each year that Pazz & Jop has run, Christgau has created a personal list of his favorite releases called the "Dean's List". Only his top ten count toward his vote in the poll, but his full lists of favorites usually numbered far more than that. These lists—or at least Christgau's top tens—were typically published in The Village Voice along with the Pazz & Jop results. After Christgau was dismissed from the Voice, he continued publishing his annual lists on his own website and at The Barnes & Noble Review.

While Pazz & Jop's aggregate critics' poll are its main draw, Christgau's Deans' Lists are noteworthy in their own right. Henry Hauser from Consequence of Sound said Christgau's "annual 'Pazz & Jop' poll has been a bona fide American institution. For music writers, his year-end essays and extensive 'Dean's List' are like watching the big ball drop in Times Square."

These are Christgau's choices for the number-one album of the year, including the point score he assigned for the poll. Pazz & Jop's rules provided that each item in a top ten could be allotted between 5 and 30 points, with all ten items totaling 100, allowing critics to weight certain albums more heavily if they chose to do so. In some years, he often gave an equal number of points to his first- and second-ranked albums, but they were nevertheless ranked as first and second, not as a tie for first. The list shows only his number-one picks.

Year	Artist	Album	Points	Ref.
1971	Joy of Cooking	Joy of Cooking	24	
1974	Steely Dan	Pretzel Logic	21	
1975	Bob Dylan and the Band	The Basement Tapes	24	
1976	Michael Hurley, The Unholy Modal Rounders, Jeffrey Frederick & the Clamtones	Have Moicy!	15	
1977	Television	Marquee Moon	13	
1978	Wire	Pink Flag	13	
1979	The Clash	The Clash	18	
1980	The Clash	London Calling	25	
1981	Various artists (Sugar Hill Records)	Greatest Rap Hits Vol. 2 [label compilation]	19	
1982	Ornette Coleman	Of Human Feelings	16	
1983	James Blood Ulmer	Odyssey	18	
1984	Bruce Springsteen	Born in the U.S.A.	17	
1985	The Mekons	Fear and Whiskey	16	
1986	Various artists	The Indestructible Beat of Soweto	18	
1987	Sonny Rollins	G-Man	16	
1988	Franco and Rochereau	Omona Wapi	16	
1989	Půlnoc	Live at P.S. 122 [bootleg recording]	17	
1990	LL Cool J	Mama Said Knock You Out	22	
1991	Various artists	Guitar Paradise of East Africa	24	
1992	Mzwakhe Mbuli	Resistance Is Defence	18	
1993	Liz Phair	Exile in Guyville	13	
1994	Latin Playboys	Latin Playboys	14	
1995	Tricky	Maxinquaye	17	
1996	DJ Shadow	Endtroducing.....	19	
1997	Arto Lindsay	Mundo Civilizado	15	
1998	Lucinda Williams	Car Wheels on a Gravel Road	23	
1999	The Magnetic Fields	69 Love Songs	16	
2000	Eminem	The Marshall Mathers LP	16	
2001	Bob Dylan	"Love and Theft"	20	
2002	The Mekons	OOOH! (Out of Our Heads)	14	
2003	King Sunny Adé	The Best of the Classic Years	20	
2004	Brian Wilson	Brian Wilson Presents Smile	22	
2005	Kanye West	Late Registration	16	
2006	New York Dolls	One Day It Will Please Us to Remember Even This	17	
2007	M.I.A.	Kala	N/A	
2008	Franco	Francophonic	18	
2009	Brad Paisley	American Saturday Night	17	
2010	The Roots	How I Got Over	16	
2011	Das Racist	Relax	12	
2012	Neil Young and Crazy Horse	Americana	15	
2013	Vampire Weekend	Modern Vampires of the City	17	
2014	Wussy	Attica!	17	
2015	Laurie Anderson	Heart of a Dog	25	
2016	A Tribe Called Quest	We Got It from Here... Thank You 4 Your Service	19	
2017	Randy Newman	Dark Matter	25	
2018	Noname	Room 25	17	
2019	Billie Eilish	When We All Fall Asleep, Where Do We Go?	N/A	
2020	Various artists	Hanging Tree Guitars	N/A	
2021	Neil Young and Crazy Horse	Barn	N/A	
2022	Selo i Ludy Performance Band	Bunch One (Note: Although Christgau placed Bunch One as his favorite album of 2022, it was actually a 2019 album that he had only reviewed that year. The highest ranked album released in 2022 was Beyoncé's Renaissance, which placed second. As he explained, "I made [Renaissance] my number two for the simple reason that a 2019 effort by an accordion-led Ukrainian rock-oldies band touched me even deeper.")	N/A	
2023	Olivia Rodrigo	Guts	N/A	
2024	Louis Armstrong	Louis in London	N/A	
2025	Margaret Glaspy	The Golden Heart Protector	N/A	

== Style and impact ==
No one in this time and place has the time to sit and listen uninterrupted for sixty minutes to anybody's music. I think Robert Christgau is the last record reviewer on earth who listens to eight records a day twice before giving his opinion on it ... Christgau is the last true-blue record critic on earth. He gave us an A-plus. That's pretty much who I make my records for. He's like the last of that whole Lester Bangs generation of record reviewers, and I still heed his words. He gets my vision, and I'm cool with that. But half these people, they read Pitchfork, and they base half their opinion and quotes on that.

— Questlove, 2008

"Christgau's blurbs", writes Slate music critic Jody Rosen, "are like no one else's—dense with ideas and allusions, first-person confessions and invective, highbrow references and slang". Rosen describes Christgau's writing as being "often maddening, always thought-provoking. ... With Pauline Kael, Christgau is arguably one of the two most important American mass-culture critics of the second half of the 20th century. ... All rock critics working today, at least the ones who want to do more than rewrite PR copy, are in some sense Christgauians." Spin magazine said in 2015, "You probably wouldn't be reading this publication if Robert Christgau didn't largely invent rock criticism as we know it."

Douglas Wolk said the earliest "Consumer Guide" columns were generally brief and detailed, but "within a few years ... he developed his particular gift for 'power, wit and economy', a phrase he used to describe the Ramones in a dead-on 37-word review of Leave Home". In his opinion, the "Consumer Guide" reviews were "an enormous pleasure to read slowly, as writing, even if you have no particular interest in pop music ... if you do happen to have more than a little interest in pop music, they're a treasure." While regarding the early columns as "a model of cogent, witty criticism", Dave Marsh in 1976 said "the tone of the writing is now snotty—it lacks compassion, not to mention empathy, with current rock."

Fans of Christgau's "Consumer Guide" like to share lines from their favorite reviews. Wolk wrote, "Sting wears his sexual resentment on his chord changes like a closet 'American Woman' fan" (from Christgau's review of the 1983 Police album Synchronicity). "Calling Neil Tennant a bored wimp is like accusing Jackson Pollock of making a mess" (reviewing the 1987 Pet Shop Boys album Actually); and "Mick Jagger should fold up his penis and go home" (in a review of Prince's 1980 album Dirty Mind).

In 1978, Lou Reed recorded a tirade against Christgau and his column on the 1978 live album, Take No Prisoners: "What does Robert Christgau do in bed? I mean, is he a toe fucker? ... Can you imagine working for a fucking year, and you get a B+ from some asshole in The Village Voice?" Christgau rated the album C+ and wrote in his review, "I thank Lou for pronouncing my name right."

In December 1980, Christgau provoked angry responses from Voice readers when his column approvingly quoted his wife Carola Dibbell's reaction to the murder of John Lennon: "Why is it always Bobby Kennedy or John Lennon? Why isn't it Richard Nixon or Paul McCartney?" Similar criticism came from Sonic Youth in their song "Kill Yr Idols". Christgau responded by saying "Idolization is for rock stars, even rock stars manqué like these impotent bohos—critics just want a little respect. So if it's not too hypersensitive of me, I wasn't flattered to hear my name pronounced right, not on this particular title track."

=== Views ===
Christgau has named Louis Armstrong, Thelonious Monk, Chuck Berry, the Beatles, and the New York Dolls as being his top five artists of all time. In a 1998 obituary, he called Frank Sinatra "the greatest singer of the 20th century". He considers Billie Holiday "probably [his] favorite singer". In his 2000 Consumer Guide book, Christgau said his favorite rock album was either The Clash (1977) or New York Dolls (1973), while his favorite record in general was Monk's 1958 Misterioso. In July 2013, during an interview with Esquire magazine's Peter Gerstenzang, Christgau criticized the voters at the Rock and Roll Hall of Fame, saying that "they're pretty stupid" for not voting in the New York Dolls. When asked about Beatles albums, he said he most often listens to The Beatles' Second Album, which he purchased in 1965, and Sgt. Pepper's Lonely Hearts Club Band.

Douglas Wolk wrote: "When he says he's 'encyclopedic' about popular music, he means it. There are not a lot of white guys in their 60s waving the flag for Lil Wayne's Da Drought 3, especially not in the same column as they wave the flag for a Willie Nelson/Merle Haggard/Ray Price trio album, an anthology of new Chinese pop, Vampire Weekend, and Wussy ..." Christgau reflected in 2004: "Rock criticism was certainly more fun in the old days, no matter how cool the tyros opining for chump change in netzines like PopMatters and Pitchfork think it is now."

In a broad sense, Christgau says he responds to qualities of "tone, spirit, [and] music", disregarding, for instance, scholarly analysis of artists such as Bob Dylan. He readily admits to having prejudices and generally dislikes genres such as heavy metal, salsa, dance, art rock, progressive rock, bluegrass, gospel, Irish folk, jazz fusion, and classical music. "I admire metal's integrity, brutality, and obsessiveness", Christgau wrote in 1986, "but I can't stand its delusions of grandeur, the way it apes and misapprehends reactionary notions of nobility". In a 2015 interview, he described heavy metal as "symphonic bombast without the intelligence and complexity, although there's a lot of virtuosity. ... That music is so masculine in a really retrograde way; I don't like that at all. It seems to me to have a very 19th-century notion of power." He said in 2018 that he rarely writes about jazz as it is "hard" to write about in an "impressionistic way", that he is "not at all well-schooled in the jazz albums of the '50s and '60s", and that he has neither the "language nor the frame of reference to write readily about them". This was even while critiquing jazz artists like Miles Davis, Ornette Coleman, and Sonny Rollins; he said "finding the words involves either considerable effort or a stroke of luck".

Christgau has also admitted to disliking the records of Jeff Buckley and Nina Simone, stating that the latter's classical background, "default gravity and depressive tendencies are qualities I'm seldom attracted to in any kind of art." He is skeptical of the notion of outsider music, having described it in one of his Consumer Guide columns as "a hustle" perpetuated by Irwin Chusid, whom Christgau describes as a "tedious ideologue." Writing in a two-part feature on music critics for Rolling Stone in 1976, Dave Marsh bemoaned Christgau as a "classic, sad example" of how "many critics ... superimpos[ed] their own, frequently arbitrary, standards upon performers." Marsh accused him of becoming "arrogant and humorless—the raves are reserved for jazz artists, while even the best rock is treated condescendingly unless it conforms to Christgau's passion for leftist politics (particularly feminism) and bohemian culture." Marsh named another prejudice of Christgau's to be "apolitical or middle-class performers" of rock music.

=== Musical genres ===
Christgau coined the term "skronk", which would be adopted by music critic Lester Bangs in his article "A Reasonable Guide to Horrible Noise" (1981). He also coined the term "pigfuck" in the early 1980s, to describe the caustic sounds of emerging noise rock band Sonic Youth.

=== "Dean of American rock critics" ===
Christgau has been widely known as the "dean of American rock critics", a designation he originally gave to himself while slightly drunk at a press event for the 5th Dimension in the early 1970s. According to Rosen, "Christgau was in his late 20s at the time—not exactly an éminence grise—so maybe it was the booze talking, or maybe he was just a very arrogant young man. In any case, as the years passed, the quip became a fact." When asked about it years later, Christgau said that the title "seemed to push people's buttons, so I stuck with it. There's obviously no official hierarchy within rock criticism—only real academies can do that. But if you mean to ask whether I think some rock critics are better than others, you're damn straight I do. Don't you?" "For a long time he's been called the 'dean of American rock critics'", wrote New York Times literary critic Dwight Garner in 2015. "It's a line that started out as an offhanded joke. These days, few dispute it."

== Personal life ==
Christgau married fellow critic and writer Carola Dibbell in 1974 and they have an adopted daughter born in Honduras in 1986. He said that he grew up in a "born-again church" in Queens but has since become an atheist.

Christgau has been long-standing, albeit argumentative, friends with critics Tom Hull, Dave Marsh, Greil Marcus and the late Ellen Willis, whom he dated from 1966 to 1969. He has mentored younger critics Ann Powers and Chuck Eddy.

== Books ==
- Any Old Way You Choose It: Rock and Other Pop Music, 1967–1973, Penguin Books, 1973
- Christgau's Record Guide: Rock Albums of the Seventies, Ticknor & Fields, 1981
- Christgau's Record Guide: The '80s, Pantheon Books, 1990
- Grown Up All Wrong: 75 Great Rock and Pop Artists from Vaudeville to Techno, Harvard University Press, 1998
- Christgau's Consumer Guide: Albums of the '90s, St. Martin's Griffin, 2000
- Going into the City: Portrait of a Critic as a Young Man, Dey Street Books, 2015
- Is It Still Good to Ya? Fifty Years of Rock Criticism 1967–2017, Duke University Press, 2018
- Book Reports: A Music Critic on His First Love, Which Was Reading, Duke University Press, 2019

== See also ==
- Album era
