= Joy of Cooking (album) =

Studio album by Joy of Cooking
- Released: 1971
- Studio: Pacific High Recording
- Genre: Folk rock
- Length: 45:38
- Label: Capitol
- Producer: John Palladino

Joy of Cooking chronology
Joy of Cooking (1971)	Closer To The Ground (1971)

Cover of the 2003 CD reissue

Joy of Cooking is the first studio album by American band Joy of Cooking formed in 1967 in Berkeley, California. The LP album was first released by Capitol Records in 1971 and reissued on CD by Acadia Records on May 5, 2003. The album peaked at 100 on the Billboard 200 in 1971.

== Critical reception ==
Professional ratings
Review scores
Source	Rating
Allmusic	3/5 stars
Christgau's Record Guide	A

In Christgau's Record Guide: Rock Albums of the Seventies (1981), Robert Christgau wrote of the album:

Led by ex-folkie Toni Brown (the principal composer) and ex-blueswoman Terry Garthwaite (whose three rhythm songs sizzle joyously), this may not be your idea of rock and roll. The music revolves around Brown's piano, which rolls more than it rocks, and the band goes for multi-percussion rather than the old in-out. I find it relaxing and exciting and amazingly durable; I can dance to it, and I can also fuck to it. The musical dynamic pits Brown's collegiate contralto against Garthwaite's sandpaper soul, and the lyrics are feminist breakthroughs. 'Too Late, but Not Forgotten' remembers a trailer camp while 'Red Wine at Noon' touches international finance, but the two protagonists are united by one overriding fact—they're victimized as wives. And it's about time somebody in rock and roll said so.

The album was listed as the 6th best of 1971 in The Village Voice's Pazz & Jop critics poll. Christgau, the poll's creator, ranked it first in his ballot, while fellow critic Ellen Willis placed it second, behind The Who's Who's Next.

== Track listing ==
All songs written by Toni Brown unless otherwise noted.

=== Side one ===
1. "Hush" (Traditional) – 2:50
2. "Too Late, But Not Forgotten" – 4:24
3. "Down My Dream" – 4:21
4. "If Some God (Sometimes You Gotta Go Home)" – 3:47
5. "Did You Go Downtown" (Terry Garthwaite) – 7:39
6. "Dancing Couple" 0:58

=== Side two ===
1. "Brownsville/Mockingbird" (Brown, Garthwaite/Furry Lewis) – 5:55
2. "Red Wine At Noon" – 3:39
3. "Only Time Will Tell Me " – 5:17
4. "Children's House" – 6:55

== Personnel ==
Joy of Cooking

- Toni Brown – arranger, composer, guitar, steel guitar, kalimba, keyboards, vocals
- David Garthwaite – bass, guitar
- Terry Garthwaite – arranger, clarinet, composer, guitar, 12-string guitar, vocals
- Fritz Kasten – drums, alto saxophone, saxophone
- Ron Wilson – congas, cowbell, harmonica, harp, percussion, tambourine

Additional personnel

- ED Denson – photography
- Jules E. Kliot – photography
- Furry Lewis – composer
- John Palladino – producer
- Phil Sawyer – engineer
- Pete Tytler – artwork
- Ed Ward – liner notes

== Charts ==
Chart (1971)	Peak position
United States (Billboard 200)	100
