= Christgau's Record Guide: The '80s =

Music reference book by Robert Christgau

- Author: Robert Christgau
- Language: English
- Subject: Albums; capsule review; discography; music journalism; popular music; rock music
- Published: 1990 by Pantheon Books
- Publication place: United States
- Media type: Print
- Pages: 514
- ISBN: 0-679-73015-X
- Preceded by: Christgau's Record Guide: Rock Albums of the Seventies
- Followed by: Christgau's Consumer Guide: Albums of the '90s

Christgau's Record Guide: The '80s is a music reference book by American music journalist and essayist Robert Christgau. A follow-up to Christgau's Record Guide: Rock Albums of the Seventies (1981), it was published in October 1990 by Pantheon Books.

The guide compiles approximately 3,000 capsule album reviews, most of which were originally written by Christgau for his monthly "Consumer Guide" column in The Village Voice through the 1980s. It covers a variety of genres and musical developments from the decade, which are given an overview in his introductory essays. Further insight is also given into his grading criteria.

The book was received positively by critics. Christgau's sensibility and the qualities of his judgements were deemed entertaining and insightful, although some regarded the writing as too challenging for most readers. Another guide was published in 2000, called Christgau's Consumer Guide: Albums of the '90s, forming a three-volume series of "Consumer Guide" collections.

== Background ==
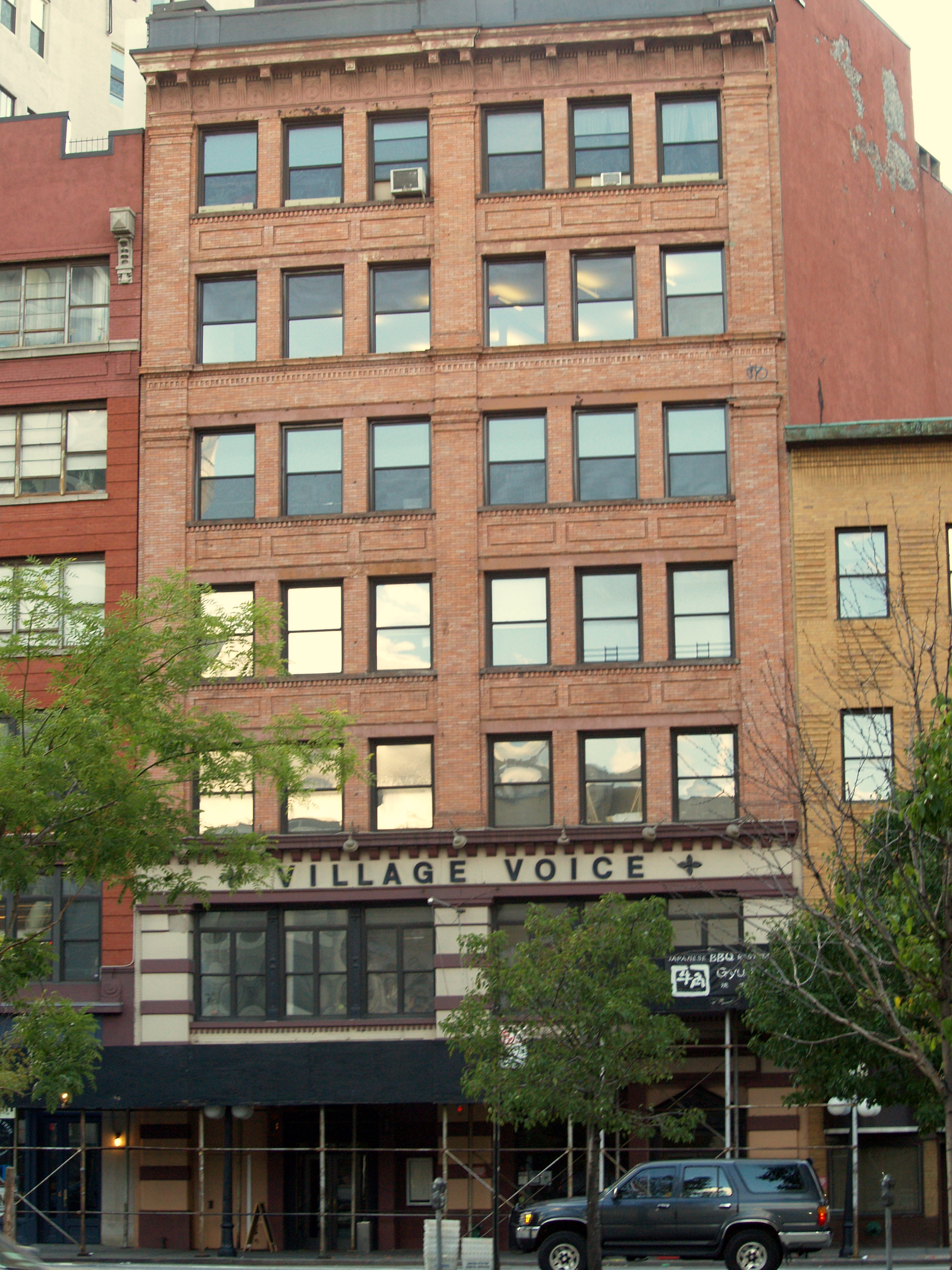
Cooper Square office building where The Village Voice was headquartered at the end of the 1980s

Christgau's Record Guide: The '80s is the second in a series of books—beginning in 1981 with Christgau's Record Guide: Rock Albums of the Seventies—to compile, revise, and expand on Christgau's capsule album reviews, which were originally written for his monthly "Consumer Guide" column in The Village Voice throughout the decade specific to each volume. Each monthly column featured 20 records chosen by Christgau for review. Discussing this in an interview for the Chicago Tribune in 1990, he said he had developed into a "processor" of music, with 12 to 14 hours of his day usually spent listening to albums:

There's something very mechanical about what I do. I'm a sophisticated and very well-oiled machine, but I am a machine. I put the music through my head even when I'm not listening because I know something rubs off. It's not the only way to be a critic. Some listen to the good stuff and listen to it hard and write about that. But in order to provide an overview of good and bad, it's the only way to do it. I don't do enough to suit myself, but I know I do more than anybody else. So that's satisfying.

Christgau later said he spent "a year or two" transforming the original reviews into this book, re-listening to albums twice.

== Content and scope ==
The book collects approximately 3,000 "Consumer Guide" reviews which range individually from 50 to 150 words—accompanied by a letter grade—and are arranged as entries, ordered alphabetically by the name of the album's recording artist, and annotated with year of release and record label. The styles of music covered throughout the collection include rock, pop, country, blues, jazz, hip hop, metal, punk rock, post-punk, and a variety of world musics, such as reggae and African genres. Among the first widely published reviewers of worldbeat music, Christgau included his critiques of music from countries such as Senegal, Nigeria, and South Africa.

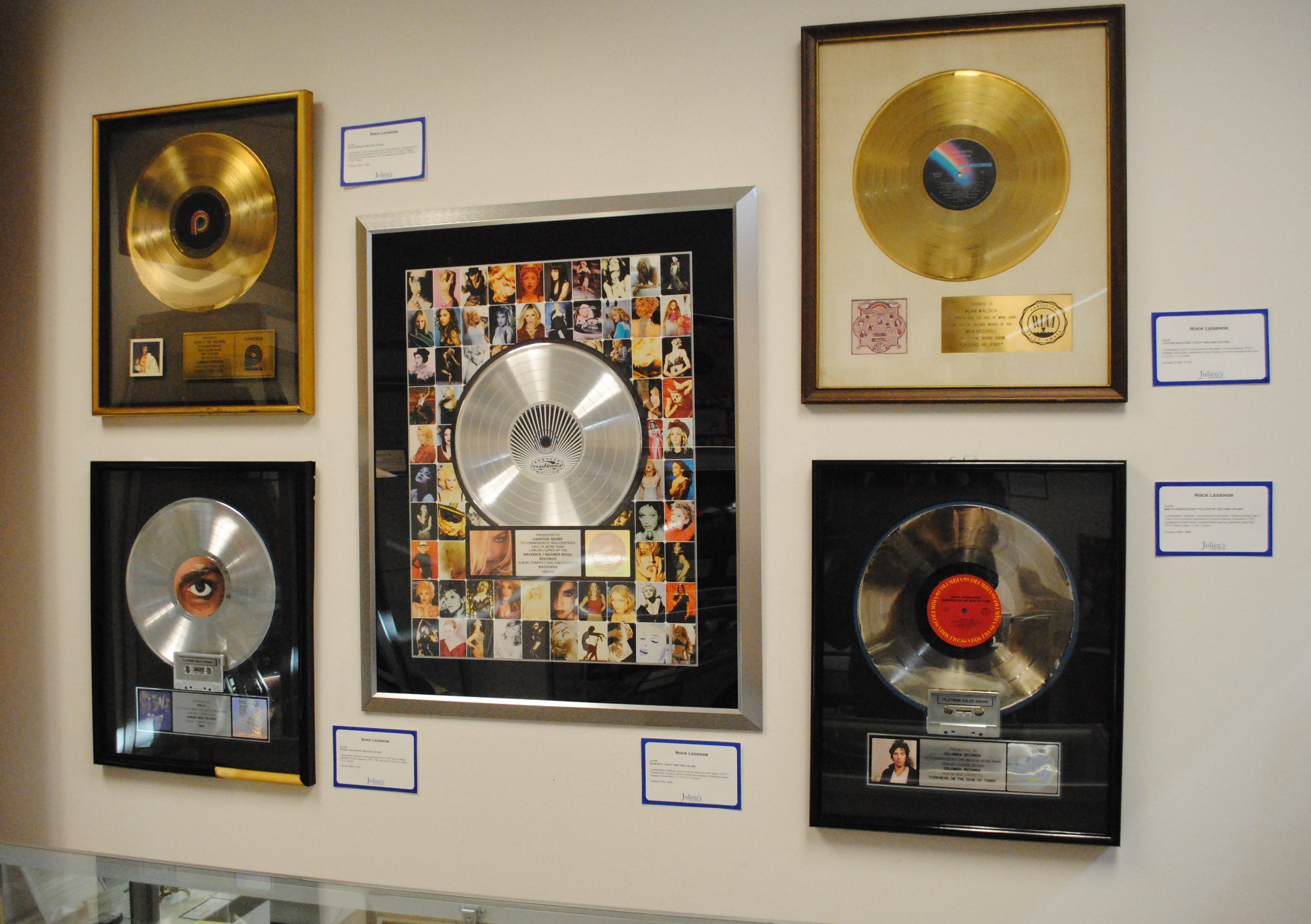
Platinum records by Prince, Bruce Springsteen, and Madonna, among the most popular musicians from the 1980s that are covered in the book

In the book's introductory essay, Christgau identifies a two-pronged criteria ("importance" and "quality") for the music reviewed in the guide: "Importance divided into cultural impact (commercial or occasionally just sociopolitical reach, with added panache preferred), subcultural acclaim (especially from rock criticism's producers and consumers, but also from alternative radio and dance DJs), and past performance (increasingly problematic as more and more artists truck on into middle age). Quality boiled down to my grading system." Like the previous volume, the guide follows a grading schema on a scale of A-plus to E-minus, although there are far fewer records graded C-minus or lower in this volume. B-plus records are the most commonly reviewed in the book, and are defined by Christgau as those offering satisfactory listen through at least half their songs and encourage revisiting: "In school, B+ is a good grade—almost any student will settle for the near-excellence it implies. It's a compliment in the Consumer Guide too."

There are also introductory essays about musical developments and trends during the 1980s. In one essay, Christgau identifies the fusion of post-punk and post-disco sounds as one of the decade's major developments while coining the term "dance-oriented rock" to describe their synthesis. An appendix lists artists overlooked in the reviews and a "core collection" of albums before 1980, including out of print records categorized as "Gone But Not Forgotten". The book was also printed with a dedication to his daughter Nina, whom Christgau and his wife Carola Dibbell had adopted from Honduras in 1985.

== Publication history ==
Christgau's Record Guide: The '80s was first published in October 1990 by Pantheon Books and was reprinted in 1994 by Da Capo Press. A follow-up to The '80s—Christgau's Consumer Guide: Albums of the '90s—was published in 2000, forming a three-volume series of "Consumer Guide" collections. The contents of all three books were made available on Christgau's website after it went online in 2001 with the help of fellow critic and web designer Tom Hull, who also served as a resource for this book.

== Critical reception ==
Reviewing the book in 1991, John Lawson of the School Library Journal said it "works well not only by itself, but also as an update" of The New Rolling Stone Record Guide (1983) and The New Trouser Press Record Guide (1989), even if it covers only one decade of music. Australian Academic and Research Libraries, the journal publication of the Australian Library and Information Association, said Christgau "gives full rein to his pithiness and proves just how readable reference books can be". Fellow rock critic Greil Marcus remarked on the guide in 1990: "The entries covering a decade's work by a performer sometimes read like tiny novels, full of suspense, dramatic turnarounds, tragedy or farce. But what makes the book work is Christgau's endless capacity for surprise."

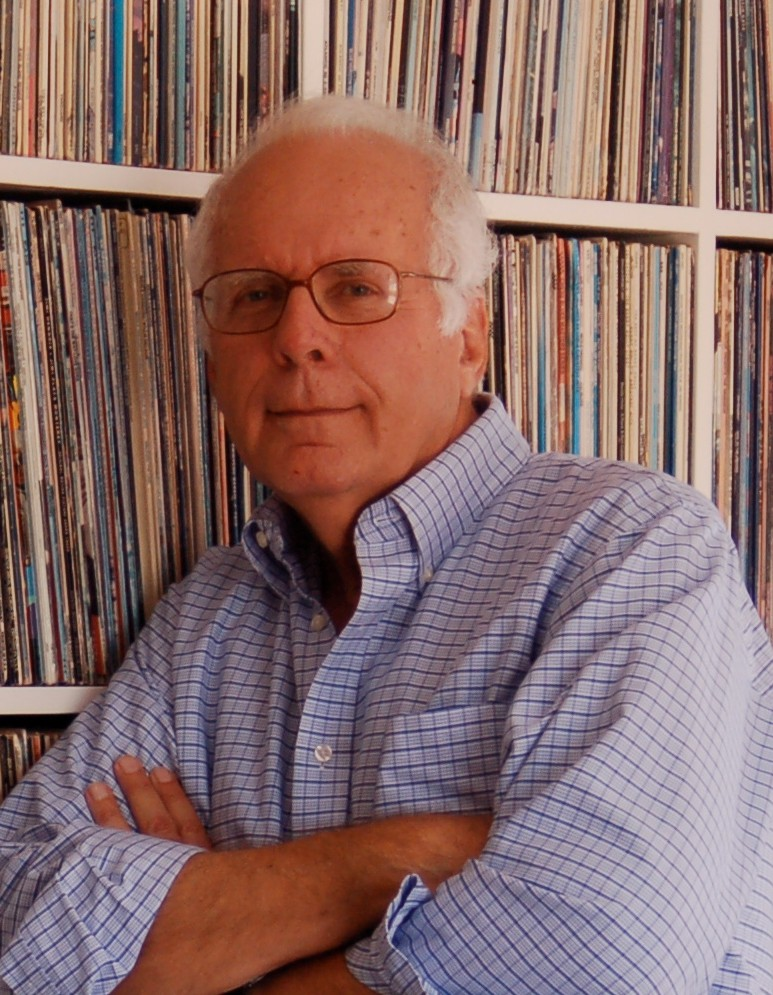
Robert Hilburn (pictured in 2009), among the guide's original supporters

In the Los Angeles Times, Robert Hilburn believed the collection of capsule reviews reinforced a number of qualities about Christgau: how his interest extends beyond individual recording artists and into "the state of rock and in the richness of its culture"; how he "constantly challenges artists, fans and other critics to demand more of themselves and their favorites"; and "why he nurtures new and significant developments, however uncommercial or controversial." Hilburn regarded him as the premier reference for popular music, and the journalistic equivalent of Bob Dylan or Neil Young: "Quite simply, Christgau writes with the same reckless independence and ferocious eccentricity that fuels our most valuable pop artists." The book's "charged eloquence" embodied rock music in the mind of Chicago Tribune critic Greg Kot, who could not recommend it "highly enough", finding the entries on pop singer Debbie Gibson and hip hop group Public Enemy especially fun to read.

The book was not without criticism. Hilburn questioned Christgau's "grouchy dismissal" of U2's 1980 debut Boy while noting a partiality for third-world music records and an impenetrability as a writer, citing the review of the 1987 X album See How We Are as an example of the latter. Kot believed Christgau was less understanding of metal and also called some of the writing inaccessible: "Sometimes he assumes an intimate understanding of not only the record he's discussing but also a host of peripheral concerns that most of his readers could not possibly possess." Library Journal's Barry Miller praised the broad-based musical coverage but deemed the writing glib and unctuous: "Christgau's catholic tastes provide a wonderful cornucopia, but the cumulative effect of his terminally hip prose and gymnastic verbal constructions ('boho Americanism,' 'antipunk discowave,' 'postprog art-rock,' 'mucho pusho,' etc.) is vacuous." Miller recommended The New Trouser Press Record Guide as an alternative of superior "depth and information".

== Legacy and reappraisal ==
Christgau's Record Guide: The '80s was used by the Music Library Association as a reference to prepare select rock recordings for A Basic Music Library: Essential Scores and Sound Recordings (1997), published by the American Library Association as a guide for librarians and other collectors. According to M. Thomas Inge's The Greenwood Guide to American Popular Culture (2002), Christgau's Record Guide: The '80s was a precursor to more popular music guide series—such as All Music Guide, MusicHound, and Rough Guides—and has since "maintained a resourceful timelessness ... Christgau's judgments are incisive, knowledgeable, and amusing."

In 2006, the "Consumer Guide" series was ranked fifth on The A.V. Club's list of the 17 most essential popular music books, with The '80s singled out as the best of the three; an accompanying blurb said it covered a decade "when Top 40 and college radio were equally compelling, and Christgau could apply his naturally skeptical eye to artists who either bore the scrutiny, or shrunk away to nothing." The website's Michaelangelo Matos, who had been greatly influenced by Christgau, said the first two volumes were books he had read most frequently as an adult. Along with Christgau's ability to "distill a record's essence into a handful of words", Murray highlighted his humor, quoting "what remains the single best sentence ever written on Prince" from the review of Dirty Mind (1980): "Mick Jagger should fold up his penis and go home". Both the 1970s and 1980s guides were cited by Nashville Scene journalist Noel Murray as "seminal works for budding rock critics, who can learn from them the art of concision and the virtue of wielding strong opinions backed by a general spirit of enthusiasm." Veteran Washington, D.C.–based critic Mark Jenkins said he would "refer to them often, both for basic facts and pithy insights".

== See also ==
- Album era
- 1980s in music
- Rockism and poptimism
- Spin Alternative Record Guide

== Bibliography ==
- Anon. (June 1994). "Book Reviews". Australian Academic and Research Libraries. 25.
- Anon. (2002). "Answers From the Dean: Online Exchange with Robert Christgau". RockCritics.com. Archived from the original on December 30, 2018.
- Campbell, Michael (2012). Popular Music in America: The Beat Goes On (4th ed.). Cengage Learning. ISBN 978-1133712602.
- Christgau, Robert (1990). Christgau's Record Guide: The '80s. Pantheon Books. ISBN 0-679-73015-X.
- Christgau, Robert (2000). Christgau's Consumer Guide: Albums of the '90s. St. Martin's Press. ISBN 0312245602.
- Davis, Elizabeth A.; Bristah, Pamela; Gottlieb, Jane; Underwood, Kent David; Anderson, William E., eds. (1997). A Basic Music Library: Essential Scores and Sound Recordings. American Library Association. ISBN 0838934617.
- Gross, Jason (June 2015). "The Dean of Rock Critics Schools Us On Himself: Robert Christgau's Going Into the City (Dey St.)". Rock's Backpages.(subscription required)
- Hilburn, Robert (October 28, 1990). "A Guide, Gossip, a Glimpse of Glory". Los Angeles Times.
- Inge, M. Thomas; Hall, Dennis, eds. (2002). The Greenwood Guide to American Popular Culture. Vol. 3. Greenwood Press. ISBN 0313308780.
- Jenkins, Mark (April 27, 2001). "Add N to (X)". Washington City Paper.
- Kot, Greg (November 15, 1990). "Elder Statesman". Chicago Tribune. Archived from the original on July 10, 2019.
- Lawson, John (June 1991). "Christgau's Record Guide". School Library Journal. 37.
- Matos, Michaelangelo; et al. (A.V. Club Staff) (June 10, 2011). "Most Re-Read Books". The A.V. Club.
- Miller, Barry (October 15, 1990). "Christgau's Record Guide". Library Journal. 115.
- Murray, Noel (January 4, 2001). "A Critical Matter". Nashville Scene.
- Murray, Noel; Phipps, Keith; Ryan, Kyle; Modell, Josh (October 6, 2006). "Inventory: 17 Essential Books About Popular Music". The A.V. Club.
- Robins, Wayne (2016). A Brief History of Rock, Off the Record. Routledge. ISBN 978-1135923464.
- Shuker, Roy (1994). Understanding Popular Music. Psychology Press. ISBN 978-0415107228.
- Wolk, Douglas (July 9, 2010). "Music's Time Capsules: 41 Years of Christgau's 'Consumer Guide'". Vulture.
