= Christgau's Record Guide =

Christgau's Record Guide may refer to:

- Christgau's Record Guide: Rock Albums of the Seventies, a music reference book by Robert Christgau
- Christgau's Record Guide: The '80s, the second book in the series

== See also ==
- Christgau's Consumer Guide: Albums of the '90s, the third book in the series
