= The Best of the Classic Years =

Compilation album by King Sunny Adé
- Released: 11 February 2003
- Recorded: 1969–1974
- Genres: Jùjú, African pop
- Label: Shanachie

The Best of the Classic Years is a compilation album by the Nigerian musician King Sunny Adé. It was released by Shanachie in 2003. The album showcases Adé's rawer pre-Island Records sound.

== Background ==
The compilation compiles material recorded between 1969 and 1974 for the Nigerian market. The 1974 hit "Synchro System" was re-recorded by Adé for his 1983 album of the same name. The album was compiled by Randall Grass.

== Critical reception ==
Professional ratings
Review scores
Source	Rating
AllMusic	4/5 stars
Robert Christgau	A+
(The New) Rolling Stone Album Guide	4.4/5 stars

(The New) Rolling Stone Album Guide called the compilation's music "an engrossing dream of interlocked beats, pealing guitars, and sweet voices." In his review of the album, Robert Christgau called Adé "a titan, one of the great pop musicians of the 20th century." He listed The Best of the Classic Years as the best album of 2003. AllMusic called it "the perfect place to start" with Adé's work. In 2020, the album was ranked number 465 in Rolling Stone's "500 Greatest Albums of All Time".

== Track listing ==
No.	Title	Length
1.	"Sunny Ti De Medley": 1. "Sunny Ti De"; 2. "Bombibele Horojo"; 3. "Oro Towo Baseti"; 4. "Ko Salapata"; 5. "African Beats Lu Nsere"	17:53
6.	"Synchro System (complete original version)"	18:12
7.	"Ibanuje Mon Iwon"	13:56
8.	"Afai Bowon"	7:04
9.	"Ogun Party Part 1"	8:59
10.	"Adena Ike"	5:36
