= John Palladino =

American record producer (1920–2014)

- Born: March 29, 1920; Ashley, Pennsylvania
- Died: December 20, 2014 (aged 94)
- Occupations: Recording Engineer, executive
- Spouse: Evelyn Blanchard Palladino

John Palladino (March 29, 1920 – December 20, 2014) was a Capitol Records producer and A&R executive. His most notable recordings were with Nat King Cole and Frank Sinatra, but he also edited records by Paul McCartney and Pink Floyd, and as an A&R man oversaw recordings by the Band and Quicksilver Messenger Service, among others. He was considered a pioneering recording engineer, being one of the earliest engineers to perfect recordings with analog tape, and developing several new recording techniques.

== Early life ==
Palladino was born on March 29, 1920, in Ashley, Pennsylvania but his family moved to Southern California when he was two years old. Palladino studied architecture at Los Angeles City College but also played in a band, and learned how to record in the college's radio station and LACC's recording studio. From 1940 to 1942 Palladino served in the Army Air Force, where he was an arranger and later a radio operator before being discharged due to illness and returning to Los Angeles.

In 1941, he found work at Radio Recorders, which recorded radio shows for delayed broadcast. where he met his future wife, Evelyn Blanchard, who did disc dubbing, tape editing, and later was a recording engineer.

== Capitol years ==
Palladino left Radio Recorders for Capitol Records not long after it opened in 1949. He was promoted to album producer for Capitol Records in 1956. Palladino used a small-studio technique, close-miking musicians and using equalization and reverberation to get sounds. he did not always agree with the move in the 1960s towards multitracking and overdubbing instruments one at a time, preferring to record all the musicians playing live simultaneously.

Palladino gained a reputation as a pioneer of developing new recording technology, including the use of Ampex recording tape, the creation of the "duophonic sound" system, and twin pack tape cartridges. He was also in demand as a tape editor, where he would re-edit or shorten tracks on albums. These included Paul McCartney and Wings' "Band on the Run" and "Silly Love Songs", Little River Band's "It's A Long Way There" and he removed profanity from the single of Pink Floyd's "Money".

As well as engineering and producing, Palladino joined the A&R department of Capitol Records in 1959 and was promoted to director of A&R Recording in 1976. As an A&R man he worked with artists such as Quicksilver Messenger Service, Steve Miller, Sons of Champlin, and Joy of Cooking.

== Awards ==
Before the National Academy of Recording Arts & Sciences began awarding Grammy Awards in 1959, Palladino received a special recognition for In the Wee Small Hours.
