= Going into the City =

Book by Robert Christgau

- Author: Robert Christgau
- Language: English
- Genre: Memoir
- Published: 2015
- Publisher: Dey Street Books
- Pages: 367
- ISBN: 978-0-06-223879-5

Going into the City: Portrait of a Critic as a Young Man is a 2015 memoir by American music critic Robert Christgau.

== Content ==
According to NPR, the memoir "takes the reader through the music that inspired [Christgau's] career, the women who sharpened his work over the years, and a childhood spent in Queens, where he learned from the DJ who gave rock 'n' roll its name." Christgau also pays tribute to the influence of his wife and fellow writer, Carola Dibbell. "Her aesthetic responsiveness was unending", he wrote. "No one affected my writing like Carola."

== Critical reception ==
Writing for the New York Times, Dave Itzkoff gave the book a favorable review, saying, among other things, that the chapter about Christgau and his wife's difficulties conceiving a child was "surely one of the book’s most touching sections." Henry Hauser of Consequence of Sound compared the book favorably to Christgau's reviews, saying they were both "dense, tight, and brimming with insight." Writing for The Guardian, Joanna Scutts said that in the book, Christgau "embraces" the challenge of "saying something new and distinctive...with undimming energy."
