= Capsule review =

Short review of creative work

A capsule review or mini review is a form of appraisal, usually associated with journalism, that offers a relatively short critique of a specified creative work (movie, music album, restaurant, painting, etc.). Capsule reviews generally appear in publications like newspapers and magazines and may be placed within the context of a cultural digest section of a publication.

Leonard Maltin's Movie Guide is a well-known publication that includes thousands of capsule movie reviews by prolific film writer Leonard Maltin, including the world's shortest capsule review according to the Guinness Book of World Records, a 2 out of 4-star review of the 1948 musical Isn't It Romantic? that consisted of only the word "no".

== See also ==
- Christgau's Record Guide

== General references ==
- Stevens, Martin; Kluewer, Jeffery (1983). "The Short Summary and Capsule Review". In print, critical reading and writing. New York: Longman. pp. 375 et seq. ISBN 9780582282919.
