= M. Thomas Inge =

American academic (1936–2021)

- Born: March 18, 1936; Newport News, Virginia, U.S.
- Died: May 15, 2021 (aged 85)
- Education: Randolph–Macon College (BA); Vanderbilt University (MA, PhD)
- Occupations: Author, Professor
- Employer: Randolph–Macon College

M. Thomas Inge (March 18, 1936 – May 15, 2021) was an American academic. He was the Robert Emory Blackwell Professor of Humanities at Randolph–Macon College in Ashland, Virginia, where he taught, edited, and wrote about Southern literature and culture, American humor and comic art, film and animation, Asian literature, and William Faulkner.

== Early life ==
A native of Newport News, Virginia, he received his B.A. degree in English and Spanish from Randolph-Macon in 1959 and his M.A. and Ph.D. degrees from Vanderbilt University in 1960 and 1964 respectively.

== Career ==
Inge taught at Michigan State University and then chaired the English departments at Virginia Commonwealth University and Clemson University.

As a senior Fulbright Lecturer, Inge taught at the University of Salamanca in Spain (1967–68), at three institutions in Buenos Aires, Argentina (1971), at Moscow State University in the former Soviet Union (1979), and at Charles University in Prague, Czech Republic (1994). As a Resident Scholar in American Studies with the US Information Agency, a part of the State Department, he lectured and did diplomatic work in eighteen countries from 1982 to 1984, earning a commendation for distinguished work in the Soviet Union.

Inge authored or edited over sixty books and has been a pioneer in the development of popular culture as a legitimate field of academic study. He was one of the founders of the Popular Culture Association. His three-volume Handbook of American Popular Culture was cited by the American Library Association as an outstanding reference work in 1979 and has been issued in revised and expanded editions in 1989 and 2002. Publications include William Faulkner: Overlook Illustrated Lives (2006), The Incredible Mr. Poe: Comic Book Adaptations of the Works of Edgar Allan Poe (2008), New Encyclopedia of Southern Culture, Volume 9: Literature (2008), My Life with Charlie Brown by Charles M. Schulz (2010), and The Dixie Limited: Writers on Faulkner and His Influence (spring 2016). The Society for the Study of Southern Literature gave him the Richard Beale Davis Award for Lifetime Contributions to Southern Letters in 2008. He founded the journal, Resources for American Literary Study, in 1971 and the Southern Studies Forum of the European Association for American Studies in 1995.

Inge was also one of the founders of the American Humor Studies Association and served for four years as Editor of its journal, Studies in American Humor. His work on humor includes editions of Sut Lovingood’s Yarns by Tennessee humorist George Washington Harris (1966, 1967, 1987), the Oxford World Classics edition of Mark Twain's A Connecticut Yankee in King Arthur’s Court (1997), and with Ed Piacentino, Southern Frontier Humor: An Anthology (2010). Some of his numerous essays on American humor have been collected in his books Comics as Culture (1990), The Frontier Humorists: Critical Views (1975), and Perspectives on American Culture: Essays on Humor, Literature, and the Popular Arts (1994).

== The M. Thomas Inge Papers ==
The M. Thomas Inge Papers (in the Comic Arts Collection at Virginia Commonwealth University) include magazines, catalogs, fanzines, programs and humor publications. This collection is composed of materials collected by Dr. Inge relating to his academic studies of the comic arts, popular culture, and American literature. The bulk of the collection is dated from the 1950s onward and is made up of many items collected by Inge covering the history of the comic arts. It includes a large collection of published and unpublished materials and ephemera items relating to the comic arts. Manuscripts by Inge and other writers are also included.

The collection contains correspondence with a number of noted artists and writers, including Art Spiegelman, Mort Walker, Bruce Duncan, and Harold Foster, and comic arts scholars. The collection includes advertisements, fan club materials, posters, art prints, animation cells, comic strip and comic book samples, comic and animation character drinking glasses, numerous buttons, records, and various other collectable items.

The collection is highlighted by a very large collection of reference journals including fanzines, newsletters, journals, and numerous other periodicals related to the comic arts. These periodical titles focus on the history and art of comic books and comic strips, cartoonists, comic book and comic strip characters, animation, and other aspects of the comic arts and popular culture. These materials, along with the hundreds of comic books and reference books donated by Dr. Inge, have been incorporated into their own individual collections.

== Articles ==
- "Faulkner Reads the Funny Papers". Faulkner & Humor, edited by Doreen Fowler and Ann J. Abadie. University Press of Mississippi, 1986.
- "Was Krazy Kat Black? The Racial Identity of George Herriman". Inge notes the 1971 San Francisco Chronicle report that Herriman's birth certificate stated he was "colored" and considers the relevance of this fact to Herriman's life and art. Inks, Volume 3, Number 2, 1996.

== Books ==
- Agrarianism in American Literature, Odyssey Press, 1969.
- Handbook of American Popular Culture, Greenwood Press, 1979 (reprinted in 1990).
- Bartleby the Inscrutable: A Collection of Commentary on Herman Melville's Tale "Bartleby the Scrivener", editor. Hamden, Conn: Archon Books, 1979.
- Handbook of American Popular Literature. Greenwood Press, 1988.
- Comics as Culture. University Press of Mississippi, 1990.
- Anything Can Happen in a Comic Strip: Centennial Reflections on an American Art Form. University Press of Mississippi, 1995.
