= Carola Dibbell =

American music journalist and author

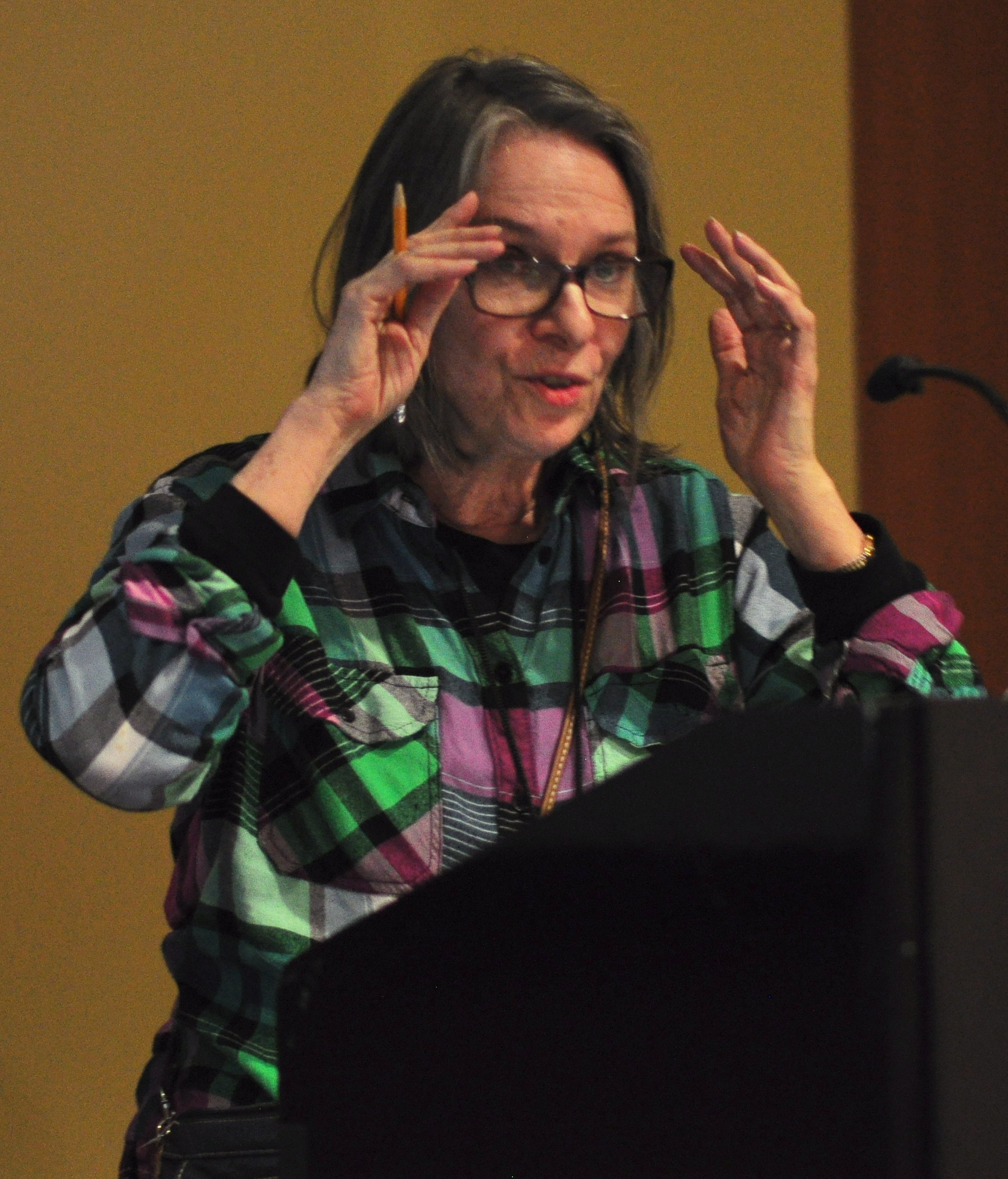
- Dibbell in 2015
- Born: April 4, 1945 (age 81); New York City, U.S.
- Education: Radcliffe College
- Occupations: Music journalist; author
- Spouse: Robert Christgau (m. 1974)
- Children: 1
- Writing career
- Genre: Science fiction
- Website: caroladibbell.com

Carola Dibbell (born April 4, 1945) is an American music journalist and author.

== Biography ==
Dibbell was born in New York City and grew up in Greenwich Village. She attended Hunter College High School and is a graduate of Radcliffe College.

Her short stories have appeared in the New Yorker, Paris Review, and other publications. She has also written music and film reviews, as well as articles about children's media, for the Village Voice. Her first book, the sci-fi novel The Only Ones, was published by Two Dollar Radio in 2015. The Washington Post's Nancy Hightower named it one of the best science fiction books of 2015.

Dibbell married music critic Robert Christgau, who introduced her to music criticism in 1974. They adopted a daughter, Nina Dibbell Christgau.
