= Joy of Cooking (band) =

American music ensemble

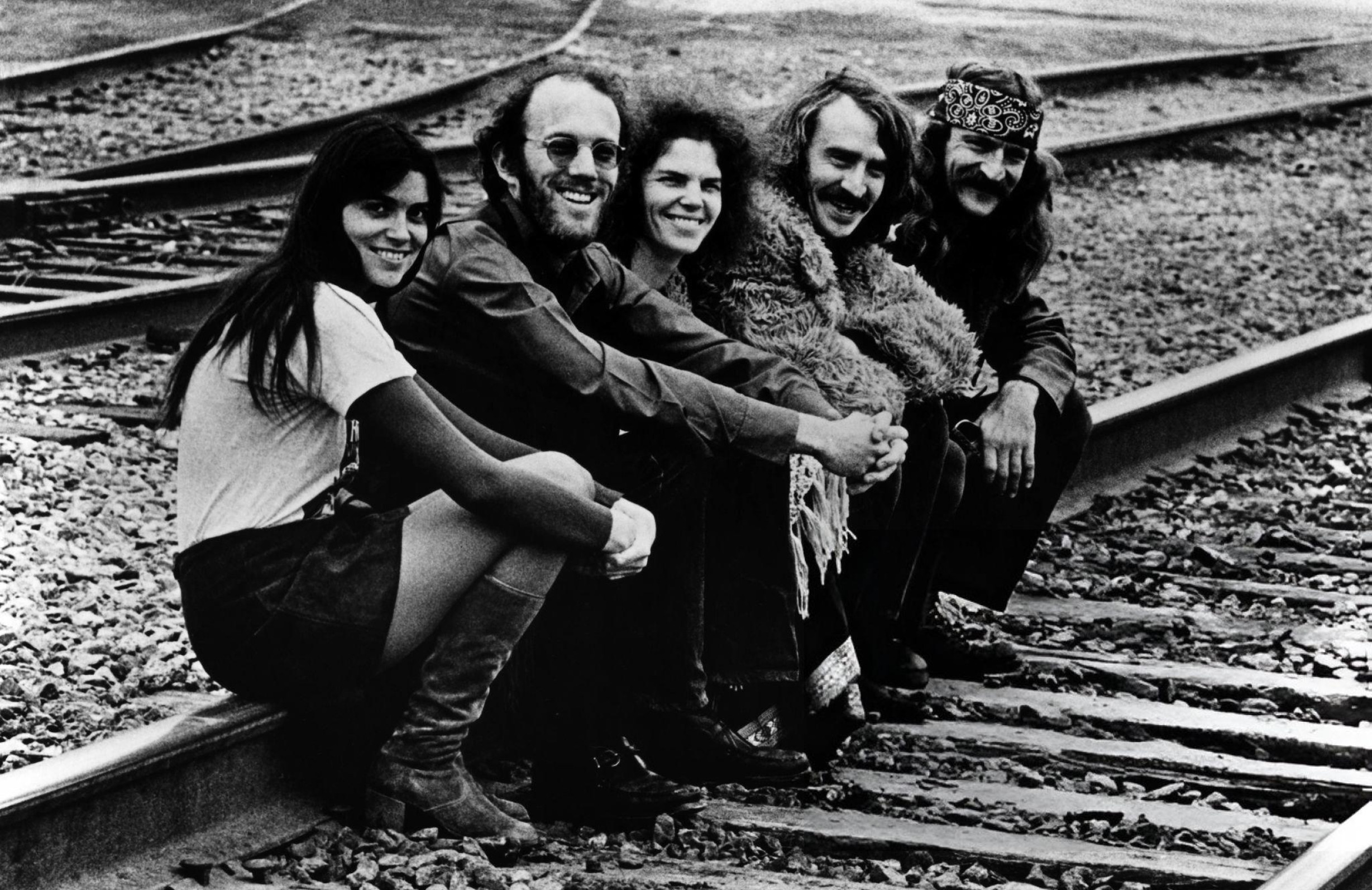
- Joy of Cooking in 1970; from left: Toni Brown, David Garthwaite, Terry Garthwaite, Fritz Kasten, and Ron Wilson.

Background information
- Origin: Berkeley, California
- Years active: 1967–1973
- Past members: Toni Brown; David Garthwaite; Terry Garthwaite; Fritz Kasten; Ron Wilson; Jeff Neighbor; Glen Frendel

Joy of Cooking was an American music ensemble formed in 1967 in Berkeley, California. Associated with the hippie culture, the band's music combined rock & roll with folk, blues, and jazz. The band released three studio albums on Capitol Records in the early 1970s as well as a minor hit single in 1971, "Brownsville". Led by guitarist Terry Garthwaite and pianist Toni Brown, who both shared lead vocals, Joy of Cooking was a rare example of a rock band fronted by women.

== Career ==
Joy of Cooking was led by pianist Toni Brown (1938–2022) and guitarist Terry Garthwaite. The rest of the band comprised bass guitarist David Garthwaite (Terry's brother), drummer Fritz Kasten, and percussion player Ron Wilson. Keyboard player Stevie Roseman replaced Toni Brown for a time. Bass players Happy Smith and eventually Jeff Neighbor replaced David Garthwaite on bass guitar and Glen Frendel was added on lead guitar.

The band's music was a mix of hippie sensibilities with rock, blues, folk, and jazz, and the lyrics often reflected feminist themes.

== Discography ==
=== Joy of Cooking ===
Capitol Records issued three albums by Joy of Cooking in the early 1970s and an anthology disc in 1993.

- Joy of Cooking (1971)
- Closer to the Ground (1971)
- Castles (1972)
- American Originals [Best] (1993)

A fourth album, Same Old Song And Dance (1973), was never released, although certain songs were included on American Originals.

A Capitol Records cassette-only release from 1990, Best Of Joy Of Cooking, features a cover of the 1924 Ma Rainey song "Walkin' Blues" that is unavailable elsewhere.

Capitol also issued a 7-inch single of the song "Brownsville" (with B-side "Only Time Will Tell Me") in 1971. The single release was a 2:25 edit of the 5:50 album cut that altered the title from "Brownsville/Mockingbird" to "Brownsville" and did not contain the "Mockingbird" segment that closes the song. "Brownsville" reached number 66 on the Billboard Hot 100 chart, becoming Joy Of Cooking's only hit single.

A compilation of previously unreleased tracks, Back to Your Heart, was issued on the independent NJOY label in 2007. The double-CD album includes a set of live music, the first such release by the band.

In 2016, a triple CD live album was released on Shady Grove, Curiosities From The San Francisco Underground Volume One. Disc 1 was by Joy of Cooking, Disc 2 by Grateful Dead and Disc 3 by It's A Beautiful Day. All live tracks were previously unreleased.

=== Toni & Terry ===
Garthwaite and Brown each had solo careers after Joy of Cooking disbanded, but they also worked together again as a duo named Toni & Terry. Their album, Cross Country, was issued by Capitol in 1973, followed by The Joy in 1977.

=== Terry Garthwaite ===
Garthwaite refocused herself on jazz music and in 1975, released her first solo album, Terry. The album was produced by David Rubinson and engineered by Fred Catero for Arista Records, and features accompaniment by numerous jazz artists of contemporaneous or future fame: Howard Roberts and Wah-Wah Watson on guitar; Chuck Domanico and Willie Weeks on bass; Sonny Burke, Roger Kellaway, and Patrice Rushen on keyboards; and Philip Smith on saxophone. Drums and percussion were played by Harvey Mason, Sr., John Guerin, Scott Mathews, James Gadson, and Bill Summers, and special guest vocals were contributed by The Valentinos and Bobby Womack. In 1976 Garthwaite was featured on a 45 rpm direct-to-disc audiophile jazz recording titled San Francisco Ltd. that received a limited release. In later years, Garthwaite recorded several more albums for independent labels including Hand in Glove (1979), Moving Day (1985), and Sacred Circles (2000).

Garthwaite recorded Live at the Great American Music Hall in 1980 (released 1981 by Flying Fish Records) with Rosalie Sorrels and monologuist Bobbie Louise Hawkins. The three artists sat on stage together and took turns performing, selecting material responsive to the prior performance. Garthwaite contributed four of the 13 tracks.

=== Toni Brown ===
Remaining close to the Joy of Cooking sound, Brown released her first solo album, Good For You, Too, on MCA Records in 1973; it was released in the US in the following year along with a 7-inch single, "Big Trout River". She continued collaborating with Garthwaite as well as released a second solo album, Toni Brown (1979) on Fantasy Records before changing careers. (Her discography is sometimes mistakenly conflated with that of former Relix magazine editor Toni Brown, who released numerous independent albums in a similar country-folk-rock vein in the 1990s and 2000s.) Brown earned a master's degree in clinical psychology and in 1991 founded Four Winds West, a non-profit transitional house for disadvantaged youth in Fairfax, California.

Brown died on August 8, 2022, at her home in Woodacre, California.
